= Love, Rosie =

Love, Rosie may refer to:

- Love, Rosie, the US title of Where Rainbows End, a 2004 novel by Cecelia Ahern
  - Love, Rosie (film), a 2014 British-German film by Christian Ditter based on the book
