= Bertie Ahern =

Taoiseach from 1997 to 2008

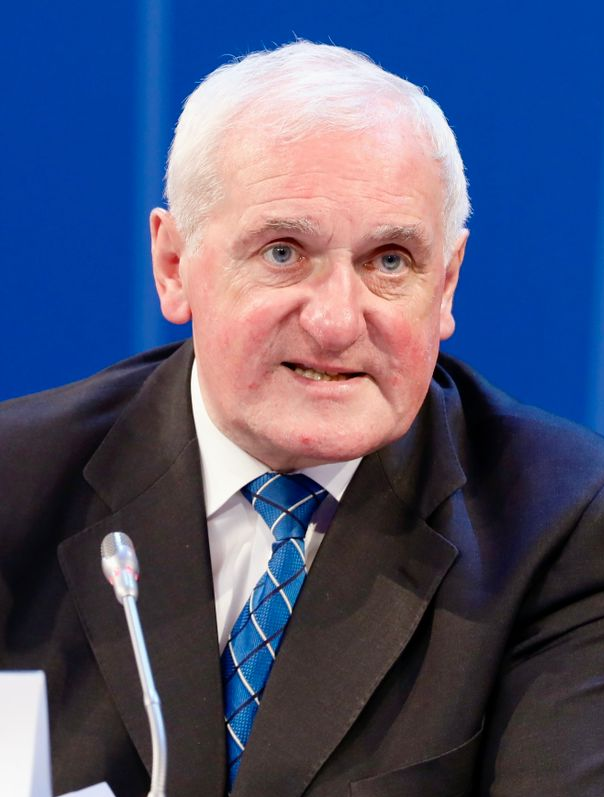
- Ahern in 2024

Taoiseach
- In office 26 June 1997 – 7 May 2008
- President: Mary Robinson; Mary McAleese
- Tánaiste: Mary Harney; Michael McDowell; Brian Cowen
- Preceded by: John Bruton
- Succeeded by: Brian Cowen

Leader of Fianna Fáil
- In office 19 December 1994 – 6 May 2008
- Deputy: Mary O'Rourke; Brian Cowen
- Preceded by: Albert Reynolds
- Succeeded by: Brian Cowen

Leader of the Opposition
- In office 15 December 1994 – 26 June 1997
- Taoiseach: John Bruton
- Preceded by: John Bruton
- Succeeded by: John Bruton

Tánaiste
- In office 19 November 1994 – 15 December 1994
- Taoiseach: Albert Reynolds
- Preceded by: Dick Spring
- Succeeded by: Dick Spring

Deputy leader of Fianna Fáil
- In office 10 February 1992 – 19 November 1994
- Leader: Albert Reynolds
- Preceded by: John Wilson
- Succeeded by: Brian Cowen

Minister for Arts, Culture and the Gaeltacht
- In office 19 November 1994 – 15 December 1994
- Taoiseach: Albert Reynolds
- Preceded by: Michael D. Higgins
- Succeeded by: Michael D. Higgins

Minister for Industry and Commerce
- In office 4 January 1993 – 12 January 1993
- Taoiseach: Albert Reynolds
- Preceded by: Pádraig Flynn
- Succeeded by: Ruairi Quinn

Minister for Finance
- In office 14 November 1991 – 15 December 1994
- Taoiseach: Albert Reynolds; Charles Haughey
- Preceded by: Albert Reynolds
- Succeeded by: Ruairi Quinn

Minister for Labour
- In office 10 March 1987 – 14 November 1991
- Taoiseach: Charles Haughey
- Preceded by: Gemma Hussey
- Succeeded by: Michael O'Kennedy

Minister of State
- 1982: Government Chief Whip
- 1982: Defence

Lord Mayor of Dublin
- In office 24 June 1986 – 26 June 1987
- Preceded by: Jim Tunney
- Succeeded by: Carmencita Hederman

Teachta Dála
- In office June 1981 – February 2011
- Constituency: Dublin Central
- In office June 1977 – June 1981
- Constituency: Dublin Finglas

Personal details
- Born: Bartholomew Patrick Ahern; 12 September 1951 (age 75) Drumcondra, Dublin, Ireland
- Party: Fianna Fáil (1965–2012; since 2023)
- Spouse: Miriam Kelly (m. 1975; sep. 1992)
- Children: Georgina; Cecelia
- Relatives: Maurice Ahern (brother); Noel Ahern (brother); Nicky Byrne (son-in-law)
- Education: College of Commerce, Rathmines

Bartholomew Patrick "Bertie" Ahern (born 12 September 1951) is an Irish former Fianna Fáil politician who served as Taoiseach from 1997 to 2008, and as Leader of Fianna Fáil from 1994 to 2008. A Teachta Dála (TD) from 1977 to 2011, he served as Leader of the Opposition from 1994 to 1997. He was also Lord Mayor of Dublin from 1986 to 1987, Tánaiste from November to December 1994, and Minister for Finance from 1991 to 1994.

Fianna Fáil led three coalition governments under Ahern's leadership; he is the second-longest serving Taoiseach, after Éamon de Valera. He resigned as Taoiseach on 6 May 2008, in the wake of revelations made by the Mahon Tribunal over payments received from developers; he was succeeded by Brian Cowen. Fianna Fáil proposed to expel politicians censured by the tribunal, but Ahern resigned his membership prior to the expulsion motion. In 2016, Fianna Fáil announced that it had given Ahern the option of rejoining the party. He rejoined in February 2023.

== Early life ==
Ahern was born in Drumcondra, Dublin, the youngest of five children of Con and Julia (née Hourihane) Ahern, both natives of County Cork, who married in October 1937. They settled at Church Avenue, Drumcondra, where they resided for the rest of their lives. The other four children are Maurice, Kathleen, Noel and Eileen. In Dublin, Ahern's father worked as a farm manager at All Hallows College, Drumcondra. Ahern's brother Noel was also involved in politics and represented Dublin North-West from 1992 to 2011.

Ahern's father Con was born into a farming family near Ballyfeard, which is located near Kinsale, County Cork, in 1904. His mother also came from a farming background and was from near Castledonovan, west County Cork. Ahern's father, Con, initially left County Cork and went to Dublin in the early 1930s to train for the priesthood, but did not complete his studies with the Vincentian order. He had fought in the Irish Civil War. He was a supporter of Éamon de Valera and the Anti-Treaty IRA. He was a member of the 3rd Cork Brigade of the IRA. He remained a militant Irish Republican for decades after the War of Independence. Con Ahern died in 1990. Ahern's mother, Julia, died in 1998, aged 87 years.

Ahern was educated at St. Patrick's National School, Drumcondra, and at St. Aidan's Christian Brothers, Whitehall. He received his third-level education at the College of Commerce, Rathmines, part of the Dublin Institute of Technology. Ahern has claimed or it has been claimed by others in circulated biographies that he was educated at University College Dublin and the London School of Economics, but neither university has any records that show Ahern was ever one of their students. He subsequently worked in the Accounts Department of the Mater Hospital, Dublin.

Ahern is an enthusiastic and vocal fan of sport. He is a supporter of Dublin GAA and attends Dublin matches in Croke Park. He also supports Manchester United F.C. and attends matches at Old Trafford and rugby matches at Lansdowne Road. He appeared as a pundit on RTÉ Two's The Premiership programme in 2001.

== Early political career ==
Ahern first became involved in a Fianna Fáil by-election campaign in 1965, climbing lamp posts to hang election posters in Drumcondra. During the campaign, Ahern met his political mentor and future Taoiseach, Charles Haughey. Ahern became a member of Fianna Fáil at the age of 17, and in the 1969 general election he assisted with the election campaign in his constituency.

Ahern first ran for office during the landslide 1977 general election when Fianna Fáil formed the last single-party majority government with a 20-seat Dáil majority, the largest ever. Ahern received 4,000 first preference votes in the newly created Dublin Finglas constituency and was elected with transfers from other candidates. He was elected at the 1979 Dublin Corporation election for the Cabra East–Finglas West local electoral area (LEA). He later switched to the North Inner City LEA before standing down before the 1991 local elections. In subsequent elections Ahern became one of the highest vote-getters in the country. In his Dublin Central constituency, electionsireland.org, run by pollsters Seán Donnelly and Christopher Took, described Ahern as:

The undisputed kingpin here. Running mates came and went, some successful and some not, all left in little doubt that their allotted role was that of subordinate hoping to pick up the crumbs from Bertie's surplus, and that they should not develop any notions of equality. Vote management elsewhere usually means trying to divide a party's votes equally among its candidates, but in Dublin Central, it meant trying to direct every available first preference to Bertie and taking it from there.

During his first years as a Teachta Dála (TD), Ahern was a backbencher, but displayed ambition. In 1979, when Charles Haughey and George Colley fought a divisive battle for the position of party leader and Taoiseach, Ahern is believed to have backed Haughey. Ahern had served on a health committee with Haughey in the mid-1970s. Following Haughey's victory, Ahern was appointed Assistant-Government Chief Whip.

In 1980, due to the illness of the actual Chief Whip, Seán Moore, he was effectively running the office. Ahern increased his personal vote in all three general elections of 1981 and 1982, out-polling his running mate, George Colley, previously a candidate for party leader. In the short-lived Fianna Fáil government of 1982, Ahern served as Government Chief Whip. Fianna Fáil were then consigned to the opposition benches for five years. During this period Ahern became Fianna Fáil Spokesperson on Labour. In 1986, he became Lord Mayor of Dublin. During his tenure, he organised the Dublin Millennium festival.

== Cabinet career ==
=== Minister for Labour ===
In 1987, Fianna Fáil returned to power as a minority government. Ahern was appointed to cabinet as Minister for Labour. In the following years, the department was important in stimulating Ireland's ailing economy. Ahern negotiated the first national wage agreement between unions and employers, The Programme for National Recovery. This and the subsequent national wage agreement came to be known as the 'Irish model' and have been adopted by a number of European countries

In 1989, Haughey called an early general election. Fianna Fáil lost seats and was entered a coalition government with the Progressive Democrats. Ahern retained his position as Minister for Labour in the government of the 26th Dáil. In 1990, Ahern negotiated the Programme for Economic and Social Progress.

In 1990, Ahern was campaign manager for the presidential bid of his cabinet colleague, Brian Lenihan. It proved to be Ahern's least successful campaign as Lenihan lost to Labour Party candidate Mary Robinson. Ahern was damaged in the short term by being seen as the first Fianna Fáil presidential election campaign manager to lose a presidential election.

In 1991, the Fianna Fáil–Progressive Democrats programme for government was reviewed. Ahern was a key player in these talks yet again. His involvement prompted Haughey to remark of Ahern:

He's the most skilful, the most devious, the most cunning of them all.

=== Minister for Finance ===
In November 1991, Reynolds, then Minister for Finance, launched a leadership challenge to Haughey. Ahern publicly backed Haughey. The challenge failed and Reynolds and his supporters were dismissed from the cabinet. In the reshuffle that followed, Ahern was appointed as Minister for Finance. According to statements given by Ahern while serving as Minister for Finance, he did not hold a personal bank account.

=== Reynolds succeeds ===
In early 1992, Charles Haughey resigned as Taoiseach. Ahern was encouraged by Haughey and others to bid for the position. He was apprehensive, and remained out of the contest, allowing Reynolds to become party leader and Taoiseach. It is believed that Reynolds and Ahern struck a deal in which Ahern would withdraw and thus remain in the cabinet, to succeed subsequently. Ahern and Michael Woods were the only two senior members to remain in the new Reynolds cabinet, with Ahern retaining his Finance portfolio.

Following the 1992 general election, Fianna Fáil formed a coalition government with the Labour Party. This lasted until 1994, when the Labour Party withdrew from government, due to unhappiness with Reynolds's proposed candidate for President of the High Court. Ahern briefly succeeded Labour leader Dick Spring as Tánaiste. However, the government fell after a motion of no confidence, proposed by Fine Gael and Leader of the Opposition John Bruton, seconded by Fianna Fáil's former coalition partners the Labour Party. Reynolds resigned as Taoiseach and Fianna Fáil leader.

During 1993, while he was Finance Minister, Ahern accepted payments of IR £39,000 from various businessmen: see below for details. These payments did not become public knowledge until 2006.

In 1993, Ahern said in an interview that tax cheaters would be jailed.

He was also under scrutiny from the Mahon Tribunal for this cash payment and subsequent revelations in May 2007, of cash received from businessman Micheál Wall. In 2012, the tribunal's final report found that he failed to "truthfully" explain the source of the money and it rejected his evidence of "dig-outs".

== Leader of Fianna Fáil ==
Ahern succeeded Reynolds as the leader; the first unopposed candidate since Seán Lemass in 1959. Ahern was elected as the sixth leader of Fianna Fáil on 19 December 1994.

Negotiations for a resumption of government with the Labour Party began immediately. It was expected that the coalition would be renewed, clearing the way for Ahern to become Taoiseach. However, due to revelations that Ahern knew more about an aspect of the scandal that toppled Reynolds than previously known, Labour withdrew from the coalition, opting instead to go into coalition with Fine Gael. Ahern found himself as Leader of the Opposition.

In the 1997 general election Fianna Fáil's campaign centred on Ahern's personal popularity. At the election, while Fianna Fáil picked up seats, its preferred coalition partner, the Progressive Democrats, lost more than half their seats. However, Labour suffered even heavier losses, leaving Fine Gael short of the support it needed to stay in office. Ahern quickly formed a coalition government with the Progressive Democrats, with the support of four Independent TDs. On 26 June 1997, aged 45, Ahern became the youngest Taoiseach since W. T. Cosgrave.

== Tenure as Taoiseach ==
=== First term (1997–2002) ===
==== Early issues ====
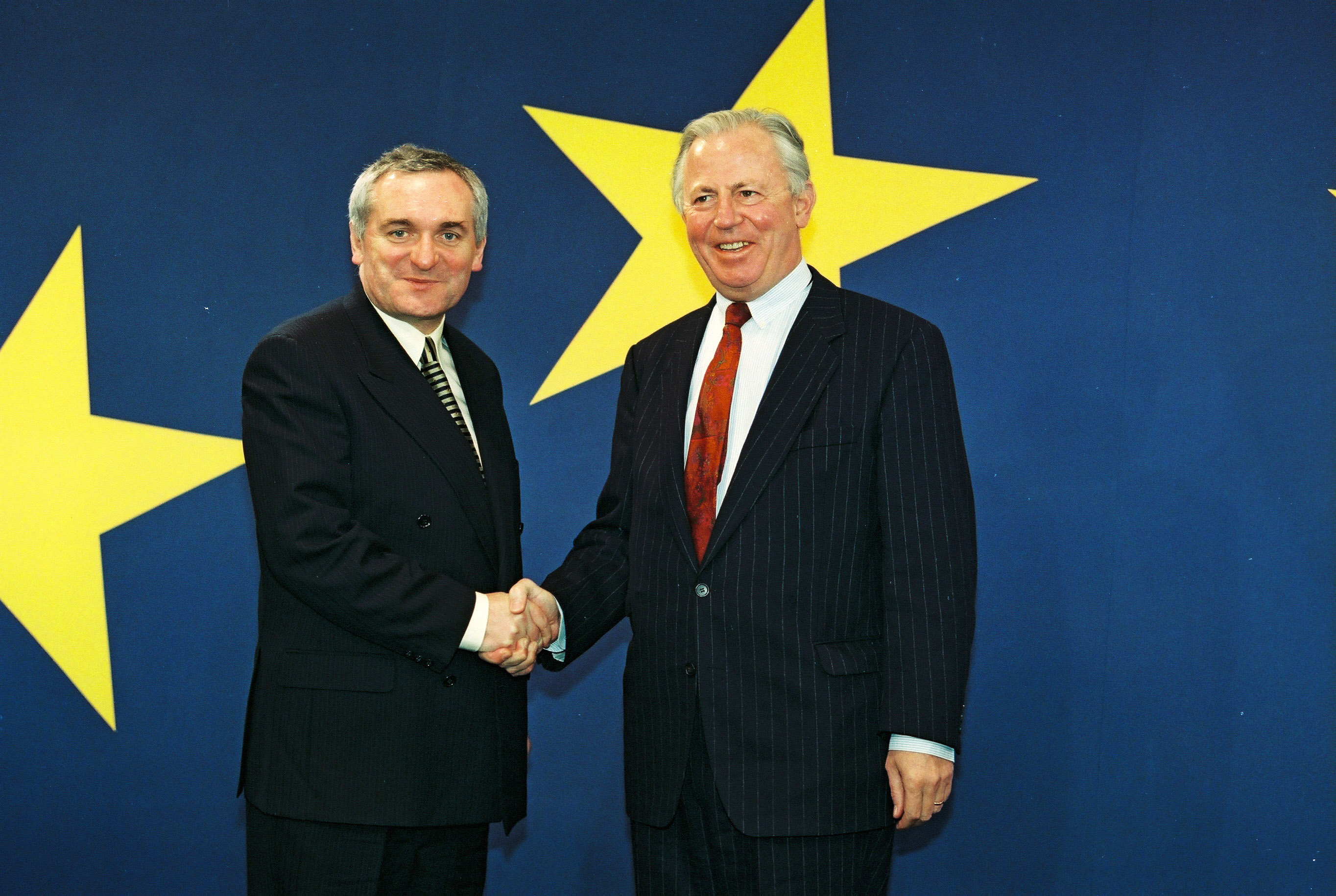
Ahern shaking hands with then President of the European Commission Jacques Santer in 1997

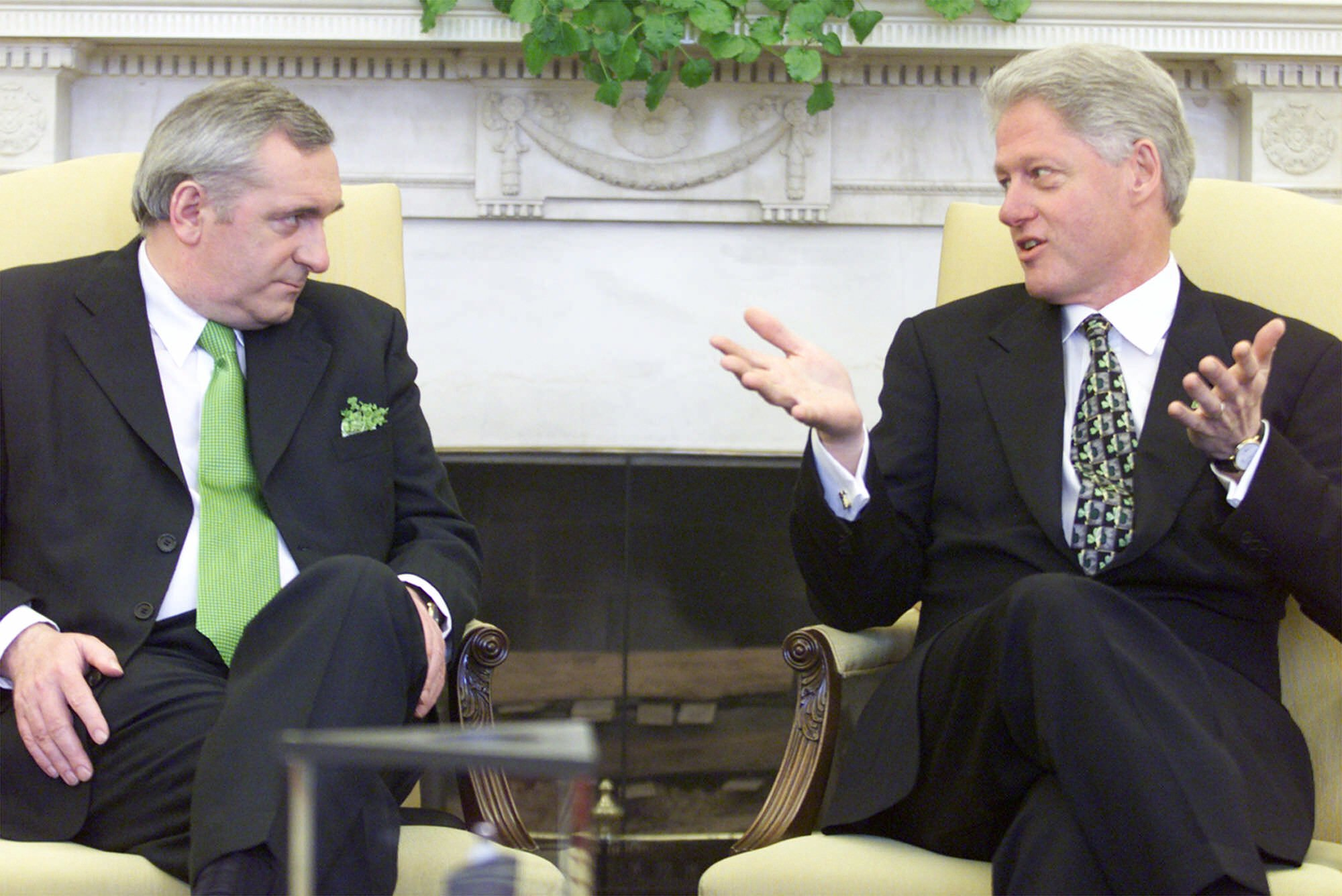
Ahern with President Bill Clinton in 2000

Ahern's first government saw some teething problems during its first six months. Firstly, Ahern tried to nominate David Andrews as Minister for Defence and as a Minister of State at the Department of Foreign Affairs. This was unconstitutional as one Minister cannot be subordinate to another.

Secondly, in July, Charles Haughey gave evidence to the McCracken Tribunal on corruption confirming that he had received IR£1.3 million (€1.7 million) in gifts from businessman Ben Dunne, which he had previously denied. This damaged Haughey's reputation more than the government's.

Thirdly, earlier allegations resurfaced about Ahern's Foreign Minister, Ray Burke. Burke eventually admitted to receiving IR£30,000 in a corrupt payment and resigned from office. Arising from those two matters, the government established the Moriarty Tribunal and the Flood Tribunal. One of the high points of the first six months was the renewal of the Provisional IRA ceasefire, which paved the way for resumed negotiations in Northern Ireland.

==== Peace process ====
A significant achievement of Ahern's first term was his part in the negotiation of the Good Friday Agreement, in which the British and Irish Governments and most Northern Irish political parties established an "exclusively peaceful and democratic" framework for power-sharing in Northern Ireland. The agreement was signed on 10 April 1998. It was seen as something special, because not only was it endorsed by the political parties, it was endorsed also by the British and Irish governments and the people of Ireland.

The agreement, the ceasefires and the political structures it created have encouraged peace. The negotiations also led to his friendship with the former British Prime Minister Tony Blair. On 26 November 1998, Blair became the first Prime Minister of the United Kingdom to address the Oireachtas. On 24 September 2003, Ahern and Blair were jointly awarded the Thomas J. Dodd Prize in International Justice and Human Rights for their work on the Good Friday Agreement to promote peace between Britain and Northern Ireland. On 22 May 2008, Ahern and Blair were both awarded honorary doctorates by Queen's University Belfast in recognition of their roles in the peace process. University Chancellor George Mitchell praised Mr Ahern as "a man of peace and a builder of bridges".

Speaking at the 1916 Easter Rising commemoration at Arbour Hill in Dublin, in 1998, Ahern said

The British Government are effectively out of the equation and neither the British parliament nor people have any legal right under this agreement to impede the achievement of Irish unity if it had the consent of the people North and South... Our nation is and always will be a 32-county nation. Antrim and Down are, and will remain, as much a part of Ireland as any southern county.

==== Economy ====
Ahern's first term in office had been a period of high economic growth in Ireland, known as the Celtic Tiger. This was followed by a property boom which led to the economic crisis of 2008–2010 and culminated in the state requiring an IMF and EU bailout in 2010. In the first term increased prosperity and a better standard of living were the main results of the Celtic Tiger economy. There were significant deficits in the provision of infrastructure in the health and transport sectors. The good economic conditions allowed Finance Minister Charlie McCreevy, to deliver several generous budgets. The 1998 and 1999 Finance Acts included special tax incentives targeted at the area covered by the pilot Rural Renewal Scheme for the Upper Shannon Area. This scheme was later subject to criticism by the Heritage Council for being introduced without a 'Baseline Audit' to inform the level and scale of development to be supported through the scheme, not identifying priority areas suitable for development, not providing any strategic protection for designated areas including the corridor of the River Shannon, nor promoting the use of sustainable design and building materials in any new build or refurbishment project supported by the scheme. This growth changed in 2008, with a difficult budget for 2008, brought forward by 2 months, as Ireland entered recession, with unemployment expected to rise 5.6% in 2008 and the construction industry in decline. Economic growth in 2008, had also slowed to its lowest levels in over a decade. In 2009, Ahern said his decision in 2001, to create the Financial Regulator was one of the main reasons for the collapse of the Irish banking sector and "if I had a chance again I wouldn't do it".

==== 2002 general election ====
The 28th Dáil served its full term, becoming the second-longest Dáil to complete a full term. The coalition of Fianna Fáil and Progressive Democrats was re-elected with an increased majority in the 2002 general election on 17 May of that year. Fianna Fáil had hoped for a majority, but ultimately came up three seats short of the 84 required. Fine Gael was decimated, losing much of its front bench. The coalition Government returned to power, comprising Fianna Fáil and the eight Progressive Democrats TDs. It was the first time a Government had been re-elected since Jack Lynch's in 1969.

=== Second term (2002–2007) ===
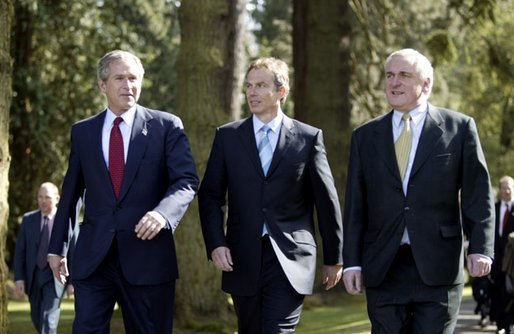
US President George W. Bush, UK Prime Minister Tony Blair, and Ahern at Hillsborough Castle in Northern Ireland on 8 April 2003.

Controversy arose when it was announced shortly afterwards that financial cutbacks were needed due to the drop in the international and Irish economies. This contradicted Fianna Fáil's promise during the election campaign when Finance Minister McCreevy was quoted several times saying that "no cutbacks, secret or otherwise, were planned". The government was accused of lying to the public, particularly concerning the war in Iraq (see below). The Government's rating fell badly in opinion polls and Ahern's popularity dropped to its minimum.

Another issue in the government's agenda for 2002, second Nice Treaty referendum, this was a second attempt to pass the Treaty of Nice.

During 2003, the government was subject to more controversy when it became public that US military aircraft, carrying large numbers of troops, were refuelling at Shannon Airport, despite widespread opposition to the 2003 invasion of Iraq. Ireland's policy since the foundation of the State has been to be a neutral party in any conflict. The Government had maintained that troops had not used Shannon but when this was disproved, it then claimed that such permission had been available for 50 years.

The drop in opinion poll ratings for Ahern and his government after the 2002 election, was followed in 2004, by Fianna Fáil's worst local election results in 80 years. His reputation for inaction in changing cabinet Ministers ended with his long-heralded 2004 Cabinet reshuffle in which he failed to sack Séamus Brennan from the cabinet. The reshuffle was not as extensive as some had hoped as only three new members entered government.

The unpopular phase seemed short-lived as the government rearranged its priorities and the economy grew. A notable law enacted by this government was the ban on smoking in workplaces and enclosed areas in March 2004. Improvements had been made in the transport infrastructure with the launch of the Luas light rail system in Dublin, many new motorways being built and the break-up of Aer Rianta, the state-owned Airport Management company.

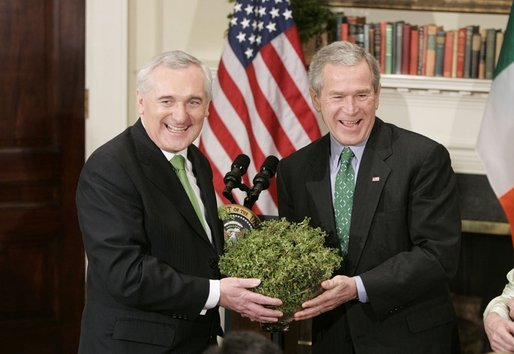
President George W. Bush accepts a bowl of shamrock from Taoiseach Bertie Ahern during a ceremony celebrating St. Patrick's Day in 2005.

In November 2004, Ahern celebrated ten years as leader of Fianna Fáil. In April 2006, he became the second longest serving Taoiseach, after Éamon de Valera.

One of Ahern's achievements in 2004, was his Presidency of the European Council, during which EU leaders agreed a European Constitution, there was recovery in EU-US relations, the EU formally admitted 10 new members, and selected José Manuel Barroso as President of the European Commission. Briefly, it appeared as if Ahern himself might become President of the European Commission, however, he declined in favour of domestic politics. The treaty was subsequently defeated in referendums in the Netherlands and France.

Ahern's government spent €52 million on the Nedap Electronic Voting system. This was challenged as being insecure and could have been tampered with to change results.

His coalition partners in government, the Progressive Democrats, said that he had questions to answer as details of an £8,000 (€11,800) payment for speaking engagements, in Manchester in 1994, emerged. The continued appearance of details of his appearances in Manchester and the names of those who were present at functions threatened to destabilise his coalition government, especially so when it transpired that one of the businessmen Micheál Wall subsequently sold a house to Ahern. The strains in the coalition eased after Ahern apologised for the second time in the Dáil and agreed to tighten up on ethics legislation.

The Moriarty Tribunal reporting in December 2006, criticised Ahern for having signed blank cheques for the then party leader Charles Haughey, who misappropriated taxpayers' funds for personal use. The disbursement of funds to Fianna Fáil and their investigation by the tribunal have raised questions about the involvement of Ahern in the administration of these funds.

In May 2007, he became the first Irish leader to address a joint session of the Parliament of the United Kingdom.

==== 2007 general election ====
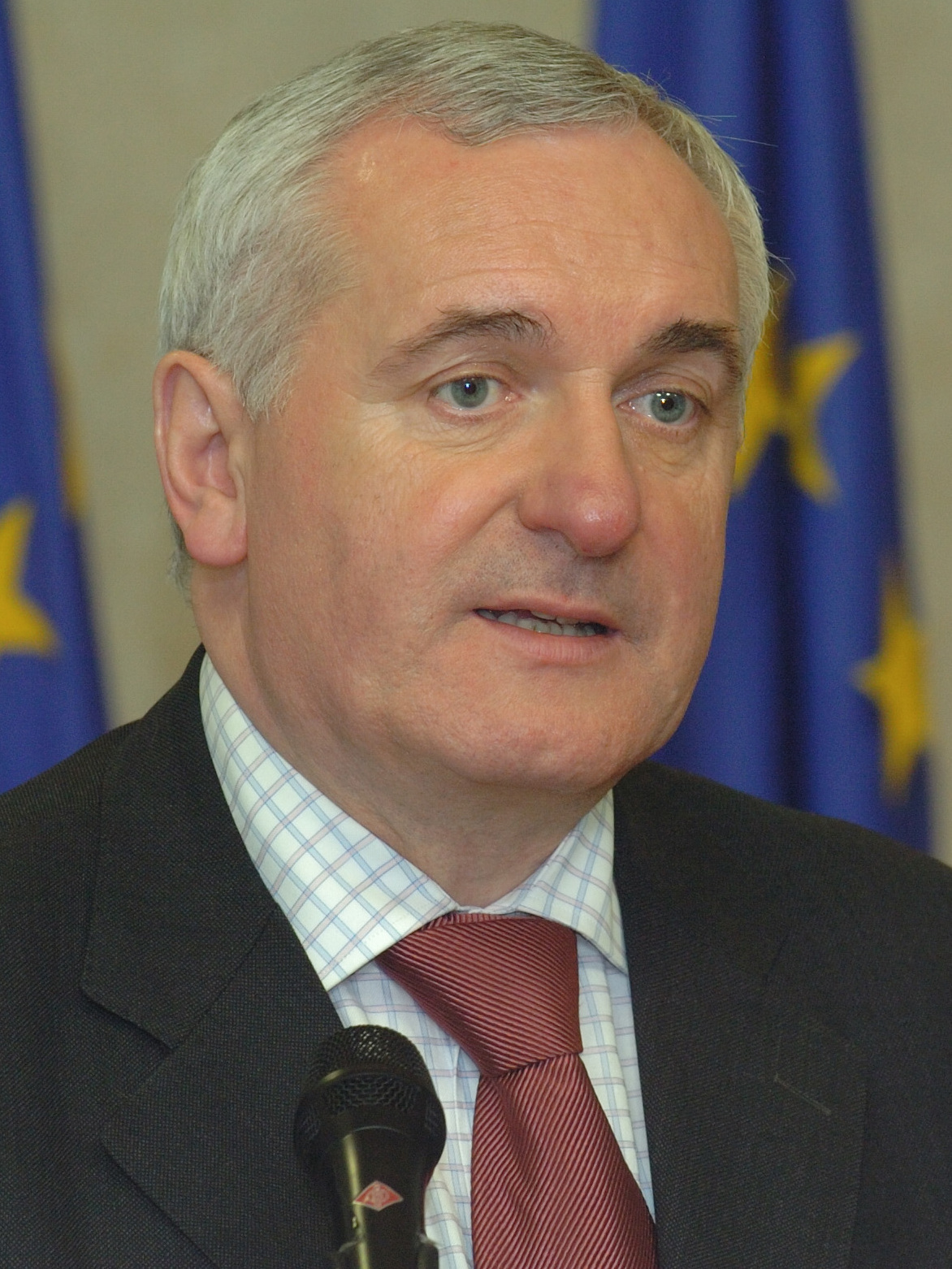
Ahern in 2006

Ahern hoped to win a third general election in 2007. While opinion polls, in April 2007, suggested that this was improbable, showing his coalition of Fianna Fáil and the Progressive Democrats at 35% and 3% respectively against the Fine Gael–Labour Party alternative government figure of 38%. A further poll published 27 April 2007 showed Fianna Fáil and Progressive Democrats at 34% and 3% respectively compared to Fine Gael and Labour at 31% and 10%. A promise at the February 2007 Labour Party conference of a cut in the basic rate of income tax, paid by 80% of workers, from 20% to 18% created some excitement in political and media circles. Income tax cuts by the Fianna Fáil–Progressive Democrats government had concentrated on the top rate of tax and Labour were able to portray their proposal as progressive to the discomfiture of Fianna Fáil.

Ahern received staunch support during the campaign from Eoghan Harris, writing in the Sunday Independent. Harris declared that the anti-Ahern campaign was the most sinister manipulation of the Irish media that he had seen in his lifetime and that Sinn Féin would be the main beneficiaries of a fall in support for Ahern and Fianna Fáil. Harris was then nominated as a senator by Ahern on 3 August 2007.

In April 2007, Ahern sought a dissolution of the Dáil and called an election for 24 May 2007. Unusually, Ahern dissolved the Dáil on a Sunday morning, claiming that President McAleese's foreign trip that week made it necessary despite the trip having been planned long before that. There was speculation that the timing was instead motivated by the commencement of the Mahon Tribunal's Quarryvale module scheduled for that week, particularly Tom Gilmartin's evidence – the hearing thus had to be postponed until after the election was over. Ahern's party received 78 seats, a loss of three seats from the 2002 election result. This was regarded as a Fianna Fáil 'victory', as questions about Ahern's finances overshadowed the early part of the election campaign, which threatened to cause huge losses for Ahern's party. His partners in the government, the Progressive Democrats, suffered a reduction in representation from 8 to 2 seats, including the loss of their leader.

=== Third term (2007–2008) ===
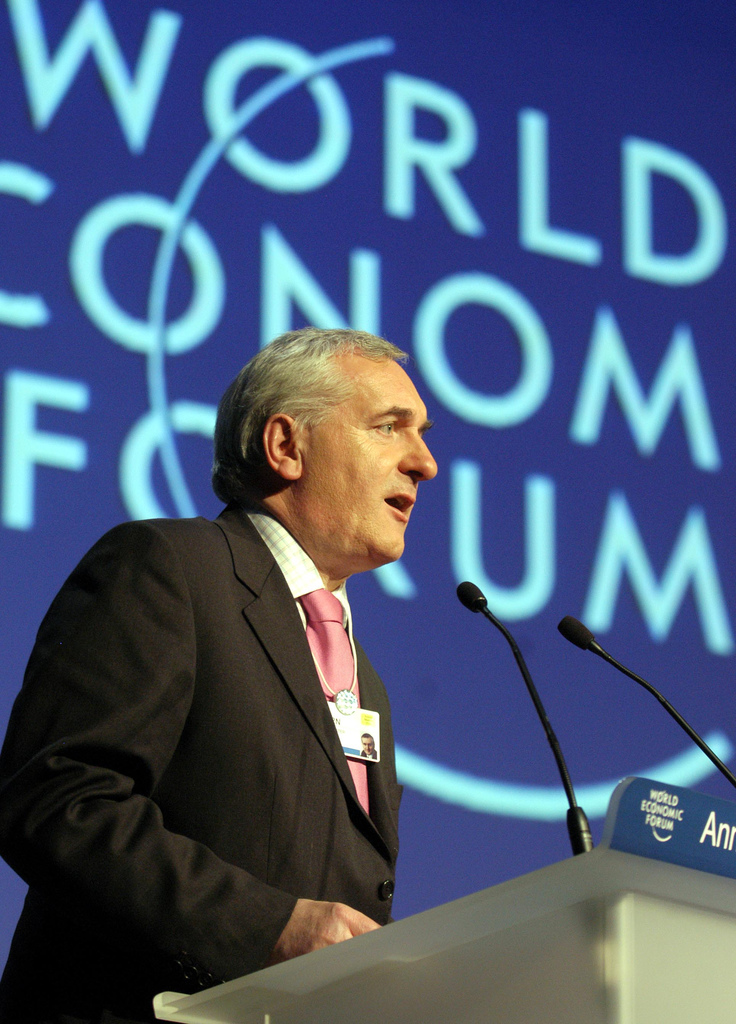
Ahern at the World Economic Forum in Davos, January 2004

Following the general election of 2007 Ahern was elected to a third term as Taoiseach, leading a rainbow coalition of Fianna Fáil, the Green Party and the Progressive Democrats, and also supported by several Independent TDs. This was the first Rainbow coalition comprising Fianna Fáil, with all their previous coalitions comprising just one partner.

Requiring 83 seats to return the government, Ahern's options were to attempt to govern with the Progressive Democrats plus two "gene-pool" Independents (Jackie Healy-Rae and Beverley Flynn; both former Fianna Fáil members) and one or more of the other three Independents, Michael Lowry, Finian McGrath or Tony Gregory (both left-wing Independents). The other options were an alliance with the Green Party or the Labour Party. Fianna Fáil negotiated a programme for government with the Green Party and formed a coalition with the Green Party and the Progressive Democrats, supported by Healy-Rae, Flynn, Lowry and McGrath.

Ahern's reputation was damaged by the accusation of cash gifts received that have transmuted to loans from businessmen. His reputation as the Teflon Taoiseach (no allegation of unethical behaviour had stuck to him until September 2006) was damaged. He was criticised in the foreign press as well as in the Irish media.

To the surprise of many observers, polls taken during and after the payments' crisis indicated a sharp rise in support for the Ahern government and a corresponding fall in support for the Opposition parties. While 55–64% of the public believed that he was wrong to accept the payments, support for his party rose to 39–42%, while support for the main Opposition parties Fine Gael and the Labour Party fell to 20–26% and 10–11%. Two-thirds believed he should not have resigned. The polls provoked complaints from the media. The Irish Times commented they were a "poor reflection of ourselves".

Ahern stated in an interview in the Village on 22 May 2007, that he intended to retire from politics when he turned 60 years of age. He stated this would mean standing down as Taoiseach before the end of the Dáil term, which would have ended in 2012 at the latest.

On 4 July 2007, Ahern stated at a conference in County Donegal that he did not understand why people sitting on the sidelines, "cribbing and moaning" about the economy, did not commit suicide. These comments came at a time when Ireland's economy was beginning to falter, and with property prices falling by up to 10% as part of the Irish property bubble. Ahern later accepted responsibility for the overheating of the property sector but took no responsibility for the failings of the Central Bank of Ireland.

In an opinion poll taken in September 2007, subsequent to Ahern's initial two-day appearance at the Mahon Tribunal, fewer than one-third of voters believed Ahern's accounts of his finances.

Opposition parties had previously been muted in their reaction but in September 2007, Labour Party leader Eamon Gilmore, called for Ahern to resign in light of his appearance at the Mahon Tribunal and on 23 September 2007, Leader of the Opposition Enda Kenny was heavily critical of the "rambling, incoherent" answers offered by Ahern to the Mahon tribunal in September 2007. Kenny said there was now a situation whereby a witness before a tribunal, testifying under oath, "is continually changing his story". It "create[s] a credibility problem and that's the issue the Taoiseach has got to deal with".

On resumption of the Dáil on 26 September a motion of no confidence in Ahern's government was moved by Fine Gael leader Enda Kenny and seconded by the Labour Party, based on Ahern's statements to the Mahon Tribunal. The Green Party, PDs and Independent TDs who supported the government voted for Ahern in the motion of no confidence. In a three-hour Dáil debate, Ahern was accused of telling "lies" and was called upon to resign.

The no-confidence motion was defeated by 81 votes to 76, with all six Green Party TDs, two PDs and four Independents, Finian McGrath, Beverley Flynn, Michael Lowry and Jackie Healy-Rae voting with the Government. In an opinion poll published in November 2007, some three-quarters of voters indicated that they did not believe that Ahern had given a full disclosure about his personal finances to the Mahon Tribunal. The opinion poll also showed more than half of the electorate believing that the whole episode was by then a serious political issue for Ahern.

A later opinion poll taken on 22 January 2008, on the issue of Ahern's personal finances and tax liabilities, found that "78% of people do not believe he has given the full picture (up 6%) while just 14% believe he has given the full picture (down 3%)."

The Minister for the Environment and leader of the Green Party, John Gormley said on 22 February 2008, that revelations concerning Ahern at the Mahon Tribunal were distracting from the work of government.

Opposition parties on 22 February 2008, branded Ahern's financial affairs as a "national embarrassment", which should prompt his immediate resignation.

Grainne Carruth's acceptance as a matter of civil probability that she had lodged sterling sums to Ahern's account at the Drumcondra branch of the Irish Permanent Building Society in the 1990s had reportedly sent shock waves through the ranks of Fianna Fáil. On 27 March 2008, the unease at Ahern's declarations at the Mahon Tribunal, as contradicted by his former secretary at the tribunal, were highlighted when Progressive Democrat coalition partner leader Mary Harney, traditionally a stern supporter of her former colleague, called on Ahern to make a statement.

The disquiet within the coalition was further emphasised when Green Party leader John Gormley, said that Ahern should clarify the contradiction between his evidence and that of his former secretary Grainne Carruth.

An opinion poll published on 25 November 2007, showed that support for Fianna Fáil had dropped by seven per cent, "following the announcement of large pay increases for the government and senior public servants against a backdrop of continuing economic uncertainty and high-profile failures in the health service."

On 2 April 2008, Ahern announced his intention to resign as Taoiseach and as leader of Fianna Fáil on 6 May 2008.

On 30 April 2008, in Washington D.C., Ahern became the sixth Irish leader to address the United States Congress. He is also the sixth person who has addressed both the UK Parliament and the United States Congress.

On 6 May 2008, he performed his last official duty as Taoiseach in opening the Battle of the Boyne visitors centre with the First Minister of Northern Ireland, Ian Paisley.

Elections to the Dáil
Party	Election		FPv	FPv%	Result
Fianna Fáil	Dublin Finglas	1977	3,729	14.1	Elected on count 7/8
Fianna Fáil	Dublin Central	1981	8,738	18.8	Elected on count 1/10
Fianna Fáil	Dublin Central	Feb 1982	8,570	18.7	Elected on count 1/10
Fianna Fáil	Dublin Central	Nov 1982	10,542	23.7	Elected on count 1/7
Fianna Fáil	Dublin Central	1987	13,635	28.7	Elected on count 1/12
Fianna Fáil	Dublin Central	1989	13,589	32.9	Elected on count 1/11
Fianna Fáil	Dublin Central	1992	11,374	31.3	Elected on count 1/10
Fianna Fáil	Dublin Central	1997	12,175	34.1	Elected on count 1/10
Fianna Fáil	Dublin Central	2002	10,882	31.9	Elected on count 1/7
Fianna Fáil	Dublin Central	2007	12,734	36.8	Elected on count 1/8

== Political views ==
Ahern led Fianna Fáil as a pragmatic catch‐all party rather than as an ideologue, once stating "I'm not big into ideology because I think that people that are into the ideology spend their time talking about it rather than doing it". When Ahern took leadership of Fianna Fáil, it had already long been a nationalist, centre‑right party with a mix of populist welfare policies and economic liberalism. Ahern himself emphasised the party's Christian‑democratic roots. As close associate Paddy Duffy recalled, Fianna Fáil under Ahern was "driven by a broad, deep‑seated Irish Christian democratic [view]: Catholic, not socialist, but doing the right thing in terms of promoting equality of opportunity and fairness". In practice, Ahern's policies reflected this mixed heritage: his governments pursued free‑market reforms and low taxes while spending heavily on social welfare, housing and infrastructure during Ireland's Celtic Tiger boom. Ahern himself leaned into the catch-all orientation of Fianna Fáil by stating the party "looks out for the small ranking guy, the middle ranking guy and assists the big guy".

=== Economics ===
Economically, Ahern presided over rapid growth as part of the Celtic Tiger Era in Ireland. His Fianna Fáil–Progressive Democrat coalition enacted deep tax cuts and pro-business policies throughout the 1990s and 2000s. Under Finance Minister Charlie McCreevy (1997–2004) the basic income tax rate fell from 26% to 20%, the top rate fell from 48% to 42%, and corporation tax was slashed to 12.5%. These "radical reforms" of the tax system occurred only when Fianna Fáil was partnered with the free‑market Progressive Democrats, as their leader Michael McDowell later directly noted. The small PD party (led first by Desmond O'Malley, then Mary Harney and McDowell) consistently pushed Ahern's government toward neoliberal policies; for example, urging transparent tax cuts to win elections. Within Fianna Fáil, there was concern that the PDs' agenda was very right‑wing: some in Fianna Fáil worried that the PD coalition was "too visibly identified with the building industry and big capital". Ahern's government coupled pro‑market policies with unusually high social spending. He boasted of expanding pensions, social welfare and affordable housing more than any previous government. Nonetheless, fiscal restraint ultimately yielded to the boom-and-bust cycle: in 2009, Ahern publicly blamed the banking collapse on policy decisions he made (notably creating a weak financial regulator in 2001) and said he would not repeat them.

=== Irish republicanism ===
Ahern drew on Fianna Fáil's republican and populist legacy, but in an inclusive, constitutional form. He often invoked Fianna Fáil's founder Éamon de Valera and the 1916 leaders as inspirations for a "democratic Republicanism" grounded in equality under law and cast his party as the "peace‑loving and conciliatory" voice of Irish nationalism. He positioned Fianna Fáil as the heir to Ireland's revolutionary tradition in a nonviolent way: stressing that true republicanism "never relied on the proceeds of crime or physical attacks" and embracing unity only "by peaceful persuasion and consent". Ahern repeatedly distinguished his party from militant groups: for example, at a 2004 commemoration, he challenged Sinn Féin to abandon the IRA, saying the insurgents "dishonoured the cause of republicanism" by their bombings. During his tenure as Taoiseach, Ahern and his party repeatedly ruled out any alliance with Sinn Féin. For example, on the eve of the 2002 general election, Ahern flatly ruled out Sinn Féin as a coalition partner: "if Fianna Fáil's popular leader, Bertie Ahern, has to make a deal...it will not be Sinn Féin" reported the Guardian.

=== Northern Ireland ===
Ahern made Northern Ireland a central focus of his tenure as Taoiseach. He strongly backed the Good Friday Agreement's vision: repeatedly noting it gave "the people of Ireland alone... the right to self-determination" and stressed that Irish unity must come "only by agreement, through harmony and in friendship". As Taoiseach, he worked to build trust with all sides: He insisted his government would pursue "constructive relations with unionists and loyalists as well as with nationalists and republicans", aiming for an even-handed implementation of the peace settlement. In practice, he pushed for normalisation: by early 2000, Ahern could tell reporters there was "no aspect of the Good Friday Agreement for which the government has responsibility that we have not either implemented, moved on or are in a position to implement soon", citing steps like army base closures and troop reductions. He also pledged never to allow "a return to the failed ways of the past" and to uphold all fundamentals of the peace deal. For example, speaking in 2004, he stressed that democratic partnership was permanent: majoritarian rule was "dead and gone" and Northern institutions must function on the Good Friday Agreement's principles.

=== Socialism ===
In late 2004, Ahern provocatively branded himself a socialist; a claim most of his contemporaries flatly rejected. In a widely discussed interview with The Irish Times, he declared himself "one of the few socialists left in Irish politics" and told the Dáil that Fianna Fáil's record since 1997 was "that of the most left-wing government this country has ever seen," even calling Fianna Fáil the "real workers' party". The remarks provoked ridicule across the political spectrum: Labour leader Pat Rabbitte said "nothing has stretched credulity so much since the press conference in Baghdad of Comical Ali", calling the claim a cynical rebranding of what he considered one of Ireland's most right-wing governments, while Socialist TD Joe Higgins later quipped "Saul's embrace of Christianity on the road to Damascus stood the test of time but the Taoiseach's embrace of socialism on the banks of the Tolka hardly will". Eamon McCann stated sarcastically that if Ahern was a socialist, then "the moon is a balloon, Ian Paisley is a member of Opus Dei and Tony Blair never told a lie in his life". Ahern's embrace of socialist language followed Fianna Fáil's poor showing in both the 2004 European and 2004 Irish local elections, when the party lost ground to Sinn Féin and other left-wing rivals, and was widely interpreted as an attempt to reconnect with alienated working-class voters. He reinforced the message by siding with workers in a dispute at Aer Lingus. However, economists and opponents stressed that inequality had widened during his tenure, with Fianna Fáil pursuing pro-business and low-tax policies, leading critics to conclude that his record was "anything but traditionally socialist."

In November 2005, Charlie McCreevy still suggested that Ahern's claims were made in earnest and that he believed them. However, in 2006, during a heated exchange in the Dáil with Higgins, Ahern bellowed, "You have a failed ideology, you have the most hopeless policy [on housing] that I ever heard pursued by any nitwit...You are a failed person...now go away".

== Controversies ==
In a November 2009, interview with VIP magazine, Ahern spoke of how critics who blame the government for the economic crisis should "dig the garden or grow bluebells or do something useful". He continued, saying that the Irish property bubble was not the fault of his government and that "cynics and knockers, people who always see the glass as half empty. I can't understand people who are always bitching, saying 'It's the Government's fault, it's the doctor's fault, it's the cat's fault.' It's everybody's fault except their own." He said in 2009, that since he resigned as Taoiseach the previous year, "life is not as controlled as it was. I'm busy doing different things, some quite important, but it's just not the same. If I want to go to a match, I go to a match; if I want to see some friends tomorrow night, I can do that, so it's a big change." Commenting on the economic difficulties facing his successor, Brian Cowen, he said: "Brian has had it rough because of the huge international slowdown. The big trick for him is how we can get out of it quickly."

In January 2010, Ahern said he would have no difficulties giving evidence to the investigation into banking, nor having his testimony heard in public. Saying he would appear if asked, Ahern defended his record while in government, attributing the crisis in banking to international factors and the banks' over-exposure to borrowing on international markets. "By and large we all know what happened. The banks borrowed money on the open market in the short term. And as soon as things went, they had to pay that money up but they hadn't got it to pay," he said. "That's what happened. I don't think it will take too long [for an inquiry] to write up what the position is." He continued, saying, "The greater issue was the protection and the regulation of the bank rather than consumers' interests." Mr Ahern also said that people were "jumping over developers" but also "needed to remember" they employed 200,000 people. He said that one of the first things that Brian Cowen had done when he became Minister for Finance was to abolish many of the property tax incentives. He also presided over many of the incentives that benefited property developers. "When they were brought in, the place was in a disastrous way. Look at the quays in Dublin. There were reports around for 40 years that said the quays needed something done about them and nothing happened until we brought in the urban renewal status and gave the tax incentives."

=== Explanation for not reacting to property bubble ===
In May 2010, Ahern said of the property-based tax incentives which aggravated the Irish economic collapse that "We probably should have closed those down a good bit earlier but there were always fierce pressures, there was endless pressures to keep them. There was endless pressures to extend them." He stated that the pressure to retain such incentives had come from developers, owners of sites, areas that did not have the developments, community councils, politicians and civic society. Ahern said that his decision in 2001, to create a new financial regulator was one of the main reasons for the collapse of the Irish banking sector, saying that "if I had a chance again I wouldn't do it." "The banks were irresponsible," he admitted. "But the Central Bank and the Financial Regulator seemed happy. They were never into us saying – ever – 'Listen, we must put legislation and control on the banks.' That never happened."

=== Pay-rises ===
On 25 October 2007, Ahern was criticised after the government accepted a recommendation from the Review Body on Higher Remuneration that senior civil servants and ministers receive pay increases. The pay-rise for his position (up €38,000 to €310,000 per annum), would have made it higher paying than that of the US President and made him the highest paid Head of government in the European Union. Criticism from opposition parties concentrated on the timing of the announcement (following highly publicised budgetary concerns at the Health Service Executive) and the fact that Ahern's increase alone would amount to about four times the basic social welfare payment. On 12 December 2007, it was announced that the first part of the pay rises would be deferred by a year, with the remainder paid in 2009 and 2010.

=== Attempt to take credit for the Gregory deal ===
Independent TD Maureen O'Sullivan accused Ahern of attempting in his autobiography to take credit for the Gregory deal by claiming he was present in negotiations between Charles Haughey and Tony Gregory and that he had provided Haughey with estimates from Dublin City Council. The Gregory deal was an agreement negotiated between the independent socialist TD Tony Gregory and Fianna Fáil leader Charles Haughey in the aftermath of the February 1982 general election, which resulted in a hung Dáil. In return for supporting Haughey, Gregory was promised a deal worth 100 million pounds at the time, which was to be used to redevelop North Inner City Dublin and to provide a greater number of houses and employment in an area which was considered Ireland's poorest and most disadvantaged. Ahern had gone with Haughey to the negotiations with Gregory; he was immediately asked to leave by Gregory and was forced to wait publicly in his car outside for three and a half hours. Although both had been elected to the same constituency, they were fierce rivals and the relationship between them was often sour. O'Sullivan was an election agent for Tony Gregory and successor as a TD.

== Payments scandal ==
Ahern was investigated by the Mahon Tribunal, following an allegation by Tom Gilmartin, that Ahern had been paid money by Owen O'Callaghan in return for favours. The Tribunal found that Ahern's explanations for lodgements to his various accounts could not be true, and thus Gilmartin's allegation could not be disproved. One lodgement of IR£30,000, in 1994, took place in the weeks following the circumstances Gilmartin described, with contemporaneous AIB notes confirming Gilmartin's account of Ahern assuring Owen O'Callaghan that a rival development at Blanchardstown would not get tax designation, and on the same day as a meeting with Owen O'Callaghan's bag-man, Frank Dunlop. The Tribunal were, however, unable to conclusively prove that the lodgement was not merely coincidental. The Tribunal also discovered that Ahern, when Taoiseach, had visited Dunlop in the weeks immediately subsequent to Dunlop's admission of corrupt payments on behalf of Owen O'Callaghan, prior to Dunlop resuming the witness stand to elaborate further on his activities.

=== Admission of undeclared payments ===
Ahern was criticised by the Moriarty Tribunal for signing blank cheques for the Taoiseach Charles Haughey, without asking what those cheques were for. Ahern told the tribunal that a policy of signing blank cheques was used on the Fianna Fáil party leader's account for reasons of "administrative convenience". In September 2006 The Irish Times printed claims allegedly leaked from the Mahon Tribunal that Ahern had received money from a millionaire businessman while Minister for Finance in 1993.

The editor of The Irish Times defended the publication as being in the public interest at a hearing of the tribunal, saying that it was not a party to the Supreme Court case which restrained the Sunday Business Post from publishing leaked documents. This order was directed against the Sunday Business Post but its interim order purported to restrain all media outlets from publishing confidential material from the inquiry.

Ahern has admitted that he did receive money but said on being interviewed that:

What I got personally in my life, to be frank with you is none of your business. If I got something from somebody as a present or something like that I can use it.

What Ahern said in 1996, while in opposition:

The public are entitled to have an absolute guarantee of the financial probity and integrity of their elected representatives, their officials and above all of Ministers. They need to know that they are under financial obligations to nobody. (Dáil Éireann transcript, December 1996)

This contradiction has been criticised in editorials in both the Irish Independent and The Irish Times

Six days after the payments were publicised, Ahern admitted in a television interview that he had received two payments totalling IR£39,000 (€50,000) in 1993 and 1994. Ahern regarded the money as a loan, but he conceded that no repayments had at that time (September 2006) been made and no interest has been paid. He said that he had attempted to repay it, but that his friends would not accept repayment. He claimed that he had "broken no codes – ethical, tax, legal or otherwise".

On 28 November 2007, former NCB managing director Padraic O'Connor at the Mahon Tribunal, "directly contradicted Mr Ahern's claims that long-standing friends gave him a loan just after Christmas 1993."

In the same interview, he also claimed that he received a payment of £8,000 from a group of 25 businessmen in Manchester on one occasion. He stated that this money was again unsolicited, that it was a gift and therefore not subject to tax as it had been received when abroad, and that it was paid to him after he gave an after-dinner speech at an ad hoc function. He claimed that the money was given to him as a private citizen, not to him in his then role as Minister for Finance, and that no other payments were received by him after speaking at other similar functions. The Irish Times reported on 30 September 2006, that part of this payment was actually a cheque drawn on NCB Stockbrokers, a large Irish company. In its final report, the Mahon tribunal found that, contrary to his sworn evidence, no 'dig-outs' in 1993 and 1994 were arranged to give money to Mr Ahern and that large dollar and sterling cash lodgements were made to his bank accounts in the mid-1990s. A number of his benefactors have received appointments as directors of State boards. Insisting that no favours had been offered or received, Ahern said:

I might have appointed somebody but I appointed them because they were friends, not because of anything they had given me.

Under the Standards in Public Office Commission's rules,

State appointments should be made on the basis of merit, taking into account the skills, qualifications and experience of the person to be appointed.

Members of Dáil Éireann must conduct themselves

in accordance with the provisions and spirit of the Code of Conduct and ensure that their conduct does not bring the integrity of their office or the Dáil into serious disrepute.

In the face of negative publicity, Ahern has repaid the monies advanced to him, with 5% interest, totalling €90,000.

On 3 October 2006, Ahern made a 15-minute statement in Dáil Éireann defending his actions in taking loans totalling IR£39,000 (€50,000) from friends in Ireland and £8,000 (€11,800) as a gift from businessmen in Manchester in 1993 and 1994. In his statement he apologised for the distress his actions had brought saying:

The bewilderment caused to the public about recent revelations has been deeply upsetting for me and others near and dear to me. To them, to the Irish people and to this house, I offer my apologies.

=== Confirmation of sterling cash lodgements ===
On 20 March 2008, at the Mahon Tribunal the disclosure, of lodgements of £15,500 sterling into building society accounts of Ahern and his daughters was accepted as a matter of probability by Ahern's former secretary Grainne Carruth.

Previously in her evidence, Carruth, on 19 March 2008 had said, that she had not lodged sterling for Ahern, while she accepted (as a matter of probability), a day later, that she must have lodged sterling on Ahern's behalf based on the paperwork available although her recollection is that she never had sighting of sterling at any time.

Ahern had told the tribunal during his evidence in February 2008, that the lodgements to his and his daughters' accounts had come from his salary as a politician.

=== "No bank account" ===
Further questions were raised about IR£50,000 (€63,300) which he had lodged in his bank account in 1994. He claimed this was money he had saved over a substantial period of time (1987–1994) when he had had no active bank account. During this period he was Minister for Labour and subsequently Minister for Finance. He was asked by Labour leader Pat Rabbitte whether, in the absence of a bank account, he had kept the money in a "sock in the hot-press" and Socialist Party leader Joe Higgins asked if he had kept the money "in a shoe-box". Ahern replied that he had kept the money "in his own possession".

=== Payment in relation to house ===
On 5 October 2006, further information emerged in the Dáil that Ahern had bought his house in Dublin, from Manchester-based Irish businessman, Micheál Wall, who was at an event in Manchester in 1994, where the Taoiseach received a payment of GBP£8,000 (€11,800). This caused further tensions within the government coalition parties.

On 10 October 2006, the Taoiseach again told the Dáil that it was an "error of judgement" for him to have accepted loans and gifts for personal purposes in the early 1990s.

Ahern expanded on his apology to the Dáil of the previous week, which he described as unqualified. Ahern said there would now be a change in the ethics law requiring office holders offered a gift from friends to consult the Standards in Public Office Commission and to accept their ruling.

=== Money from developer ===
Allegations had been made that he had taken IR£50,000 (€63,300) from a property developer, Owen O'Callaghan, in return for favours at this time. Ahern won a libel action against a Cork businessman, Denis "Starry" O'Brien, defending himself against this allegation.

However, broadcaster Eamon Dunphy, has testified in the Mahon Tribunal that he was told by developer Owen O'Callaghan, that Ahern was "taken care of" to support a shopping centre development in the 1990s. This followed the initial allegations, denied by Ahern and O'Callaghan, by retired developer Tom Gilmartin, that O'Callaghan told him that he had given Ahern a payment of £50,000 in 1989, and a payment of £30,000 in 1993, in connection with a development of lands at Quarryvale, west Dublin. Gilmartin further alleged being told that O'Callaghan had paid Ahern in excess of £20,000 in relation to tax designation of a site in which O'Callaghan had an interest in Athlone, the designation having been Ahern's last act as Finance Minister, before the Fianna Fáil-led Government fell in December 1994.

Ahern was responsible for placing disgraced former Dublin West TD Liam Lawlor, as head of the Dáil Ethics Committee, despite having been told by Tom Gilmartin many years beforehand that Lawlor had corruptly demanded money and had thwarted Gilmartin's plans when Gilmartin refused to comply.

In March 2007, one of Ahern's Manchester benefactors, Paddy "The Plasterer" Reilly, was appointed as the Fianna Fáil director of elections, for Ahern's Dublin Central constituency.

In April 2007, it was alleged in a statement by his former official driver, that Ahern in 1994, while Minister for Finance, took a briefcase full of cash to Manchester. This has been denied by Ahern.

While the payment details initially seemed to damage Ahern's standing, the result of the 2007 general election, indicated that the damage was minor. In April 2007, an opinion poll found that nearly half of voters believed Ahern still had questions to answer over the payments controversy.

=== Money given to Celia Larkin ===
On 2 February 2008, it emerged at the Mahon Tribunal that a house was bought by Ahern's former partner Celia Larkin in 1993, with money donated to Ahern's constituency organisation in Drumcondra. There was no documentation to back up this loan to Larkin or to prove around IR£30,000 in other expenditure from this account.

Dublin businessman Tim Collins has denied that Ahern was a joint holder of the so-called BT account from which Larkin was loaned IR£30,000 without documentation to describe the loan agreement. Tim Collins denied that the BT account referred to Bertie and Tim, even though he operated a joint account with Des Richardson known as the DT account.

=== Appearance at the Mahon Tribunal ===
On 13 September 2007, Ahern commenced four days of testimony under oath at the Mahon Tribunal. On 13 September, Ahern admitted that he had not cooperated with the Mahon planning tribunal. On 14 September 2007, inconsistencies in Ahern's statements to the Tribunal emerged, after he changed his story on the infamous IR£25,000 dig-outs.

On 21 September 2007, Ahern again changed his story and said he could not remember key events at the centre of the controversy.

Tribunal Chair, Judge Alan Mahon, said there were "significant gaps" in the money trail provided by Mr Ahern which "would have made it impossible for the tribunal to follow the trail".

Judge Gerald Keyes accused Ahern of having no recollection of buying £30,000 of luxury items in the early 1990s.

Judge Mary Faherty, accused Ahern of giving "polar opposite" accounts of why he withdrew IR£50,000 from AIB in January 1995.

On 24 September 2007, there were further discrepancies, memory lapses and contradictions to his testimony under oath with Ahern agreeing with the assertions of the tribunal that there are inconsistencies and contradictions in his statements compared to bank records and the testimony of Larkin.

Journalist Vincent Browne, has asserted that "Ahern's numbers game just doesn't add up".

Again on 20 and 21 December 2007, Ahern spent two further days under questioning by the Mahon tribunal about his finances in the 1990s. In January 2008, it was revealed that Ahern was in discussion with the Revenue Commissioners about his liability for tax on the sums received in Manchester and on his tax clearance status as declared in 2002, before details of the Manchester payments were revealed. The opposition leader Enda Kenny said it was not acceptable to have a Taoiseach who could not declare compliance with the tax codes.

On 12 February 2008, it emerged that the Mahon tribunal did not have all of the information provided to it, contrary to Ahern's assertion in the Dáil that he had provided all information to the tribunal. Ahern has taken a High Court action to prevent the tribunal from questioning him on the information that he released in the Dáil in 2006.

The total value of lodgements and other transactions involving Ahern was said to exceed £452,800. The lodgements and transactions occurred between 1988 and 1997, although the vast bulk of the money was lodged in the period to 1995.

On 4 June 2008, Ahern admitted that he knew about sterling deposits before his secretary's testimony, but said to laughter at his Tribunal appearance on that day that those deposits were winnings from horse racing.

=== Tax Clearance Certificate ===
The Standards in Public Office Commission was asked to investigate Ahern's declaration of tax compliance after the 2002 general election. In mid-January 2008, it emerged in the press, reportedly as leaks from parties to the Mahon tribunal, that Ahern would not be in a position to present a Tax Clearance Certificate to the Dáil, as required under ethics legislation. This certificate is issued by the Revenue Commissioners to persons who have shown themselves to be tax compliant. To meet legal requirements, this certificate should have been presented to a Dáil committee by 31 January 2008, by all those elected to the Dáil. A caveat allowed that in the absence of this, a certificate stating that the Dáil member was in negotiation with the Revenue Commissioners would suffice. An inability to declare tax compliance by a prominent individual such as Ahern would prove highly embarrassing, and could potentially have had more serious repercussions. The Standards in Public Office Act (2001) determines the tax clearance requirements for persons elected to the Oireachtas, and others. The making of a false declaration would also be an offence.

Ahern's inability to furnish a tax clearance certificate led to further calls for his resignation. He was, at the time, the only member of the Oireachtas not to have a tax clearance certificate. On 14 January 2008, while on a visit to South Africa, Ahern accused Enda Kenny, Leader of the Opposition of telling a "bare-faced lie" about Ahern's tax situation. Ahern and Fianna Fáil's response has not addressed the issue, but has attacked the leaking of Ahern's tax affairs so as to attempt to enable the non-compliance issue to be ignored.

Ahern admitted to the Mahon Tribunal on 21 February 2008, for the first time, that he did not pay tax on substantial payments that he received when Minister for Finance in the 1990s.

=== Mahon Tribunal Final Report ===
The Mahon Tribunal report was made public on 22 March 2012. A key finding was that:

Much of the explanation provided by Mr Ahern as to the source of the substantial funds identified and inquired into the course of the Tribunal's public hearings was deemed by the Tribunal to have been untrue.

— Mahon Tribunal

While the report did not accuse Ahern of corruption, it stated that it totally rejected his evidence and that of related witnesses about the sources of monies in his own and related bank accounts, and that Ahern failed to truthfully account for a total of IR£165,214.25 passing through accounts connected with him.

In 1993, the Taoiseach Albert Reynolds and Ahern, who was then Minister for Finance, wrote to developer Owen O'Callaghan seeking a substantial donation. At the time O'Callaghan was heavily involved in lobbying for state support for a stadium project at Neilstown, County Dublin. According to the report, O'Callaghan felt compelled to donate a sum of IR£80,000 to Fianna Fáil to get funding for the stadium. The Mahon Tribunal said it did not find the payment to be corrupt. However, the report said pressurising a businessman to donate money when he was seeking support for a commercial project was "entirely inappropriate, and was an abuse of political power and government authority".

== Public image ==
Ahern's presentational style has been described as Bertiespeak.

"It is not correct, and if I said so, I was not correct – I cannot recall if I said it, but I did not say, or if I did, I did not mean to say it – that these issues could not be dealt with until the end of the Mahon Tribunal."

In 2004, Joe Higgins described Ahern's response to questions as "like playing handball against a hay stack. You hear a dull thud but the ball never comes back to you." Ahern features as one of the main characters portrayed in spoof radio comic strips Gift Grub and Nob Nation. The fortnightly magazine The Phoenix featured "De Diary of a Nortsoide Taoiseach", a satirical column written from Ahern's point of view in a phonetic transliteration of his broad north Dublin accent. His idiosyncratic delivery made Ahern a doyen of satirists and impersonators, from Dermot Morgan (in the 90s) to Mario Rosenstock (RTÉ 2 TV, 2012). Ahern was satirised in a spoof publication Bertie's little book of ethics.

In October 2010, he and some other News of the World columnists appeared in a TV advertisement for the newspaper where they were seen sitting inside kitchen fittings. In his section of the advertisement, he was seen sitting inside a kitchen cupboard, with tea and gingernut biscuits. Opposition parties described the skit as "terrible" for the country. Miriam Lord of The Irish Times described him in this incarnation as "looking and sounding like Drumcondra's answer to Rodney Dangerfield", while Lise Hand of the Irish Independent commented that he was "surrounded by vegetables, ginger nuts and the disintegrated remnants of the dignity of his former office". When asked for an explanation by the Sunday World, Ahern replied that it was "just a bit of craic" and that "you [journalists] get paid more [than columnists]".

In September 2011, Ahern said he believed that he would have "done all right" in the presidential election but for the decline in the popularity of Fianna Fáil. Ahern confirmed he considered running in the election. "I still would have done all right. I mean they have done some figures and I would probably sit in around 30 per cent, which you haven't a hope with as the party is on 20 per cent." He added that "the party popularity is the thing that snookers it, because if your party isn't winnable..." Ahern said: "If there was no downturn and if it wasn't all the hassle of the tribunals and everything else, then you could have had a good run at it." He predicted that "nobody is going to win it outright – like Mary McAleese had it won on the first count". Asked about a possible future candidacy in the following presidential election, he said: "Normally what happens in this country, if a president does a good job they stay on, so that's 14 years, so that ends any chance that I'll have." He also rejected suggestions that the Mahon tribunal would reject the evidence he gave on his personal finances. "The only thing that is important to me is the central allegations. And what the tribunal says about the other trash is irrelevant."

Micheál Martin said the former taoiseach was "out of touch with reality" if he believed he could have won the presidency for Fianna Fáil. Martin also said expenses paid to Ahern in his capacity as a former Taoiseach were too high and should be reduced. He was commenting on reports that Ahern had claimed €265,000 for "secretarial services" and €7,500 on mobile phone bills since he stepped down in May 2008. Under the current expenses regime, a former Taoiseach may employ two secretarial assistants for up to five years after leaving office and one indefinitely after that.

In September 2011, Ahern was criticised by his party, Fianna Fáil, with a senior party figure saying "Every public utterance he makes digs it deeper every time. From the day he left the Dail, it's been one thing after another. The party members are very pissed off. It's coming up right across the country."

A biography of Ahern was published in 2011, Bertie: Power & Money, by Colm Keena.

=== Approval ratings ===
Ahern took office with a 74% approval rating. That number soared to 84% and 81% in 1998 following the signing of the Good Friday Agreement with then-UK prime minister Tony Blair. In early 1999, Ahern's ratings fell to 59% before rising to 70% later year. From 2000 to 2002, his ratings hovered around 54–70% before falling to 51% then 44% later that year.

In 2003, Ahern's approval rating fell to its low point of 36% following weak economic growth and corruption scandals of his TDs. In 2004, his ratings rose to 47% before going down to 44% before eventually rising to 60%. Ahern's ratings then hovered between 47 and 60% before the cash-payments scandal came where his approval rating fell to 43% then after his resignation, left office with a 40% approval.

== Retirement from politics ==
On 30 December 2010, in a speech to his party cumann in the Dublin Central constituency, he announced that he would not be contesting the 2011 general election. Ahern said he had made it clear as far back as 2002, that it was always his plan to step down as a TD before he was 60.

Asked if he had any regrets, he said: "If I had seen the banking crisis coming. Nobody advised me, no economist, all those people now writing books saying 'I told you so' – none of them."

On Anglo Irish Bank, he said: "I can honestly say that not once did anyone or any delegation that came in to see me ever say, 'Watch out for Anglo' ... I wish they had have."

Referring to the "great economic storm" currently underway in Ireland, he warned against excessive pessimism: "Some gains have been lost, but in truth many remain. I dearly wish there was no crisis. I realise that it would have been better if some things had been done differently, but I will not denigrate the good that has been done."

However an independent review of the operation of the Department of Finance during Ahern's tenure in government and its performance over the course of a decade, by Canadian expert Rob Wright, revealed how repeated warnings to the government of the dangers of the budgetary policies pursued during the boom years were repeatedly ignored. Ahern declined to comment on the report.

Shortly after announcing his retirement from politics, Ahern attacked his successor Brian Cowen, over Cowen's failure to communicate with the public and criticised the government's handling of the EU/IMF bailout. This attack broke the convention that former Taoisigh should not publicly criticise their successors.

Ahern said in January 2011, there was no hope of Fianna Fáil retaining two seats in his Dublin Central constituency. None of his party candidates were subsequently elected in his former constituency.

He receives annual pension payments of €152,331.

Ahern said in April 2018 that he was considering running for President in 2025 as an independent candidate.

In April 2018, he walked out of an interview with DW News after being questioned on the findings of the Mahon Tribunal.

In October 2018, Ahern was appointed to chair the Bougainville Referendum Commission, which is responsible for preparing an independence referendum in Bougainville, Papua New Guinea, which took place in December 2019.

== Legacy ==
Historian John A. Murphy said:

"Did Ahern, in his 11 years of power, make the most of this unprecedented prosperity for the public benefit? The answer can hardly be positive, given the present state of health, education and infrastructure, generally."

Historian Diarmaid Ferriter said:

"There'll be broad consensus around what Bertie did in Northern Ireland, the social partnership and the unity he brought to his own party. Also, he made Fianna Fáil the permanent party of government. They used to have all of the power most of the time, but now they have most of the power all of the time. All of that takes skill. But I wonder will people talk about 'Ahernism'? Is there any such thing? What does he actually stand for? In some ways Bertie's lack of vision was a positive, it made him flexible and willing to compromise, and he was certainly outstanding in that regard. But I dissent from the universal plaudits going around at the moment. He had no social or economic vision for the state he led. There was no fire in his belly. He didn't really want to change society for the better. He was the ward boss writ large. But at the moment it seems it's unfashionable to say anything adverse about Bertie."

Stephen Collins noted that:

"None of his colleagues is really sure whether he is possessed of all the deviousness and cunning attributed to him by Haughey or whether he simply suffers from chronic indecision disguised as political shrewdness".

Ryanair chief executive Michael O'Leary noted in a radio interview that

"Bertie squandered the wealth of a generation and I think in time it will be proven he was a useless wastrel." In November 2009, Ahern was again criticised by O'Leary, being described as a "feckless ditherer".

A documentary series – Bertie – on RTÉ television in November 2008 examined the life and career of Ahern.

Colm Keena in a biography of Ahern described how "his desire for power and an almost complete absence of political conviction, left him open to the influence of those with strong opinions, whose interests precipitated his mismanagement of the Irish economy."

Ahern is also the subject of a Rubberbandits single released in August 2020.

In July 2025, Ahern was the subject of the CMAT song Euro-Country, which contains lyrics that lament Ahern's damage to Ireland, blaming Ahern for a surge of suicides in Ireland following the economic crash.

== Post-political activities ==
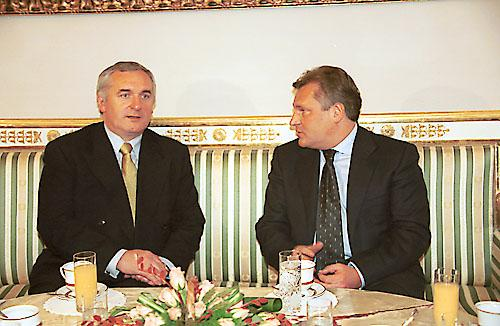
Bertie Ahern, 2011

While still a TD but having resigned as Taoiseach, Ahern was appointed to an international advisory group on conflict resolution on 14 July 2008. In addition Ahern serves as a board member of the peace and reconciliation charity Co-operation Ireland.

Ahern was appointed to an advisory board of an Irish company Parker Green International. He was appointed Chairman of the International Forestry Fund on 1 January 2010.

He wrote a sports column in the now-closed Rupert Murdoch-owned Sunday newspaper News of the World.

In 2009, he earned around €467,200, from his speaking arrangements alone. He is registered with the Washington Speakers Bureau which charged $40,000 (€29,200) per speech—and he gave 16 speeches in 2009. He also had in that period, a €92,672 TD's salary and expenses.

Between his resignation in 2008 and May 2010, he ran up a €5,682 bill for VIP airport facilities and a mobile phone bill of €8,331. This amount claimed by Ahern, was the largest of any former Taoiseach.

In February 2012, he reversed his decision to give part of his pension back to the State.

Since resigning as Taoiseach in 2008, Ahern has been a regular visitor to China. In November 2014, he gave a lecture on cyberspace security at the three-day World Internet Conference in Wuzhen. His handshake with Chinese Prime Minister Li Keqiang while there got pictured on the front page of the South China Morning Post above a story about "internet big hitters".

In February 2015, Ahern received an honorary doctor of laws degree from Washington College in Chestertown, Maryland.

In a December 2015 interview with BBC Radio 4's Today programme Ahern said low-pay workers had brought the country to its knees because they got "cocky" and insisted on "second, third and even fourth homes". The former Taoiseach said that the availability of cheap credit through Ireland's involvement in the eurozone created "a huge problem". "Anyone could walk into any institution and seem to get any amount of money and this is where the cocky bit came in. "Unfortunately... Joe Soap and Mary Soap, who never had a lot, got the loans for the second house and leveraged the third house off the second house and the fourth on the third, and you know, what are you having yourself." This drew criticism on radio and on social media for being exaggerated and for blaming the financial crisis on low-income families.

In April 2018, Ahern abruptly walked out of an interview with German broadcaster Deutsche Welle after he was questioned about how the Mahon Tribunal had ruled he had not truthfully accounted for payments of IR£165,000 made to bank accounts connected to him, as well as highlighting previous assertions that Ahern was "a finance minister without a bank account".

In December 2019 Ahern acted as chairman of the referendum commission for the Autonomous Region of Bougainville in a non-binding vote with regards to independence from Papua New Guinea.

Ahern rejoined Fianna Fáil in 2023 amid speculation he was considering running for president in 2025, but did not run in the end.

He was elected a fellow of the World Academy of Art and Science in July 2025.

=== 2026 Dublin Central by-election racism accusations ===
In 2026, while canvassing in the Dublin Central by-election, Ahern was secretly filmed during a conversation about immigration in which he said that "the ones I worry about are the Africans", that he has concerns about the level of immigration, and that Ireland "can't be taking in people" coming from "the Congo". He also singled out people from "the next generation of Muslims". The Green Party candidate in the by-election, Janet Horner, described the comments as "not only harmful, but hurtful to the people who live in the constituency he once represented. They are untrue and ill-informed", while Labour leader, Ivana Bacik, called for a full apology. He later stood over the views expressed but added that he was wrong to single out a particular group of people.

A few days after Ahern's comments were reported in the media, a Congolese man, Yves Sakila, died while being restrained by private security guards on Henry Street in Dublin. His death was linked to Ahern's comments by Social Democrats TD, Gary Gannon and by People Before Profit by-election candidate Eoghan Ó Ceannabháin. Separately, Donnah Vuma, a Social Democrat candidate in the 2024 Limerick City and County Council election who works for the migrant rights organisation Doras, said that she would "refuse to be silent about the connection between [Bertie Ahern's] rhetoric and what happened to Yves Sakila", claiming that "Anti-Black racism runs through assumptions, institutions, and the mouths of respected elder statesmen who face no real consequence for what they say". Shane O'Curry of the Irish Network Against Racism said "It is hard to think about the circumstances surrounding the death of this man...and not connect it to the unsavoury and dehumanising comments by...Bertie Ahern".

== Personal life ==
=== Family ===
In 1972, Ahern met Miriam Kelly, a bank official who lived near the Aherns' family home. They were married in St. Columba's Church, Iona Road in 1975. Ahern has two daughters from his marriage: Georgina and Cecelia. Georgina married Nicky Byrne, a member of the pop group Westlife. Cecelia is an author and screenwriter whose novels include PS, I Love You; Where Rainbows End; and If You Could See Me Now.

Ahern and his wife separated in 1992. Until 2003, Ahern maintained a relationship with Celia Larkin. Ahern is the only Taoiseach to have a legal separation from his wife.

Larkin was appointed to the board of the National Consumer Agency in July 2005, on the recommendation of the Department of the Taoiseach.

Ahern is an enthusiastic and vocal fan of sport. He is a supporter of Dublin GAA and attends inter-county matches in Croke Park. He also supports English soccer outfit Manchester United Football Club and attends matches at Old Trafford, as well as Scottish soccer outfit Celtic Football Club and rugby matches at the Aviva Stadium. He appeared as a pundit on RTÉ Two's The Premiership programme in 2001.

=== Religious faith ===
Ahern is a practising Roman Catholic. He attends Mass every Saturday evening in St Mary's Pro-Cathedral in Dublin. However, he was publicly criticised by Cardinal Desmond Connell, then Archbishop of Dublin, for his public relationship with Larkin.

Ahern has said that he lives by the Ten Commandments, the Beatitudes and his own conscience, and hopes to get to heaven when he dies. Speaking to Gay Byrne in RTÉ's The Meaning of Life series, Ahern described himself as a regular Mass-goer, but said he had not been to Confession for 40 years. In a lengthy interview, Ahern said that he and the former DUP leader Ian Paisley, bonded over their shared faith when they had their first formal meeting together. The meeting took place in January 2004, at the Irish Embassy in London. He recalled how Paisley began a prayer in the Irish Embassy and he joined in with him. He said the prayer was "like our Confiteor" and officials had wondered why they had spent so much time alone. The pair started discussing their values and the rules by which they lived. His government came under severe criticism for the deal they made with the religious orders, capping their contribution to the redress board at €128 million while taxpayers will have to pay out €1 billion.

As a Catholic, Ahern said he wanted the church "to do well" but that it could not retreat behind canon law. "There was one time when the church tried to put up the defence of canon law and my colleagues just looked up to the sky and thought they were joking. Unfortunately, they weren't joking, they made bad decisions." Ahern said he was convinced that life "did not end at the graveyard" and he often prayed to dead relatives for guidance. He used Mass as an opportunity to pray for people in trouble and stayed off alcohol in November and at Lent. He rationalised inexplicable events, such as the death of a young person, by stating that God "cannot influence every single thing". He said he received a "fair amount of hate mail" about "living in sin", but it upset other people more than it did him and he admitted that he had not lived up to his parents' "stereotype" of married life.

== Governments ==
The following governments were led by Ahern:

- 25th government of Ireland (June 1997 – June 2002)
- 26th government of Ireland (June 2002 – June 2007)
- 27th government of Ireland (June 2007 – May 2008)

Political offices
Preceded by Fergus O'Brien	Government Chief Whip; 1982	Succeeded by Seán Barrett
Preceded by Fergus O'Brien	Minister of State at the Department of Defence; 1982	Succeeded by Seán Barrett
Preceded by Gemma Hussey	Minister for Labour; 1987–1991	Succeeded by Michael O'Kennedy
Preceded by Albert Reynolds	Minister for Finance; 1991–1994	Succeeded by Ruairi Quinn
Preceded by Pádraig Flynn	Minister for Industry and Commerce; 1993	Succeeded by Ruairi Quinn
Preceded by Dick Spring	Tánaiste; 1994	Succeeded by Dick Spring
Preceded by Michael D. Higgins	Minister for Arts, Culture and the Gaeltacht; 1994	Succeeded by Michael D. Higgins
Preceded by John Bruton	Leader of the Opposition; 1994–1997	Succeeded by John Bruton
Preceded by John Bruton	Taoiseach; 1997–2008	Succeeded by Brian Cowen
Preceded by Silvio Berlusconi	President of the European Council; 2004	Succeeded by Jan Peter Balkenende
Civic offices
Preceded by Jim Tunney	Lord Mayor of Dublin; 1986–1987	Succeeded by Carmencita Hederman
Party political offices
Preceded by John Wilson	Deputy leader of Fianna Fáil; 1992–1994	Succeeded by Mary O'Rourke
Preceded by Albert Reynolds	Leader of Fianna Fáil; 1994–2008	Succeeded by Brian Cowen

Dáil	Election	Deputy (Party)	Deputy (Party)	Deputy (Party)
21st	1977	Jim Tunney (FF)	Bertie Ahern (FF)	Luke Belton (FG)
22nd	1981	Constituency abolished		

Dáil	Election	Deputy (Party)	Deputy (Party)	Deputy (Party)	Deputy (Party)
19th	1969	Frank Cluskey (Lab)	Vivion de Valera (FF)	Thomas J. Fitzpatrick (FF)	Maurice E. Dockrell (FG)
20th	1973	Frank Cluskey (Lab)	Vivion de Valera (FF)	Thomas J. Fitzpatrick (FF)	Maurice E. Dockrell (FG)
21st	1977	Constituency abolished			

Dáil	Election	Deputy (Party)	Deputy (Party)	Deputy (Party)	Deputy (Party)	Deputy (Party)
22nd	1981	Bertie Ahern (FF)	Michael Keating (FG)	Alice Glenn (FG)	Michael O'Leary (Lab)	George Colley (FF)
23rd	1982 (Feb)	Bertie Ahern (FF)	Michael Keating (FG)	Tony Gregory (Ind.)	Michael O'Leary (Lab)	George Colley (FF)
24th	1982 (Nov)	Bertie Ahern (FF)	Michael Keating (FG)	Tony Gregory (Ind.)	Alice Glenn (FG)	George Colley (FF)
24th	1983 by-election	Bertie Ahern (FF)	Michael Keating (FG)	Tony Gregory (Ind.)	Alice Glenn (FG)	Tom Leonard (FF)
25th	1987	Bertie Ahern (FF)	Michael Keating (PDs)	Tony Gregory (Ind.)	Dermot Fitzpatrick (FF)	John Stafford (FF)
26th	1989	Bertie Ahern (FF)	Pat Lee (FG)	Tony Gregory (Ind.)	Dermot Fitzpatrick (FF)	John Stafford (FF)
27th	1992	Bertie Ahern (FF)	Jim Mitchell (FG)	Tony Gregory (Ind.)	Joe Costello (Lab)	4 seats 1992–2016
28th	1997	Bertie Ahern (FF)	Jim Mitchell (FG)	Tony Gregory (Ind.)	Marian McGennis (FF)	4 seats 1992–2016
29th	2002	Bertie Ahern (FF)	Dermot Fitzpatrick (FF)	Tony Gregory (Ind.)	Joe Costello (Lab)	4 seats 1992–2016
30th	2007	Bertie Ahern (FF)	Cyprian Brady (FF)	Tony Gregory (Ind.)	Joe Costello (Lab)	4 seats 1992–2016
30th	2009 by-election	Bertie Ahern (FF)	Cyprian Brady (FF)	Maureen O'Sullivan (Ind.)	Joe Costello (Lab)	4 seats 1992–2016
31st	2011	Mary Lou McDonald (SF)	Paschal Donohoe (FG)	Maureen O'Sullivan (Ind.)	Joe Costello (Lab)	4 seats 1992–2016
32nd	2016	Mary Lou McDonald (SF)	Paschal Donohoe (FG)	Maureen O'Sullivan (Ind.)	3 seats 2016–2020	
33rd	2020	Mary Lou McDonald (SF)	Paschal Donohoe (FG)	Gary Gannon (SD)	Neasa Hourigan (GP)	4 seats from 2020
34th	2024	Mary Lou McDonald (SF)	Paschal Donohoe (FG)	Gary Gannon (SD)	Marie Sherlock (Lab)	4 seats from 2020
34th	2026 by-election	Mary Lou McDonald (SF)	Daniel Ennis (SD)	Gary Gannon (SD)	Marie Sherlock (Lab)	4 seats from 2020
