= Celia Larkin =

Irish civil servant

Celia Larkin, also known as Cecilia Larkin, is a former Irish civil servant and was the partner of the Taoiseach Bertie Ahern. Since 2020 she has worked for Limerick City and County Council as Limerick City Centre Revitalisation Manager.

== Relationship with Bertie Ahern ==
Their relationship ended in April 2003. Ahern is separated, though not divorced, from his wife Miriam. There was some controversy in the media at Ahern's public presentation of his partner. No other European Heads of Government had (at that time) similarly presented their partner at official engagements. Ahern was accused of hypocrisy in being associated with a woman other than his wife while being a practising Massgoer. The media discovered the couple had broken up when Larkin failed to co-host a diplomatic dinner for the visiting German Bundespräsident, although her name, along with that of the Taoiseach, was featured on the invitations.

During her relationship with Ahern, Larkin regularly served as his consort. She also occasionally engaged in civic functions in a private capacity. For example, she launched a high-speed ferry, the M.V. Jonathan Swift for Irish Ferries.

On 2 February 2008, it emerged at the Mahon Tribunal that a house was bought by Larkin in 1993, with money donated to Ahern's constituency organisation in Drumcondra. There was no documentation to back up this loan to Larkin or to prove around IR£30,000 in other expenditure from this account. Dublin businessman Tim Collins, has denied that Ahern was joint holder of the so-called BT account from which Larkin was loaned IR£30,000 without documentation to describe the loan agreement. Tim Collins denied that the BT account referred to Bertie and Tim, even though he operated a joint account with Des Richardson known as the DT account.

== Other activities ==
Since parting with Ahern, she has expanded her chain of beauty salons, and has appeared on reality television, in an RTÉ show The Restaurant,.

In July 2005, Larkin was appointed to the board of the new National Consumer Agency, a government funded consumer watchdog.

As a mature student Larkin has graduated from the University of Limerick with a first class honors degree in Politics and International relations, graduating top of her class. She completed a post graduate course in University College London.

In 2016 she began worked for Thames Water in their HQ at Reading as External Affairs Manager. Now known as Cecilia Larkin, in 2020 she was appointed by Limerick City and County Council as Limerick City Centre Revitalisation Manager.
