= Sharon McCarthy =

Sharon McCarthy may refer to:

- Sharon McCarthy, character of PS, I Love You
- Sharon McCarthy, character of All Good Things (film)
- Sharon McCarthy (basketball), in Wheelchair basketball at the 1992 Summer Paralympics
