= A Place Called Here =

2006 novel by Cecelia Ahern

A Place Called Here / No Place Like Here
- First edition cover
- Author: Cecelia Ahern
- Language: English
- Genre: Novel
- Publisher: HarperCollins
- Publication date: 2006
- Publication place: Ireland
- Media type: Print (Paperback)
- Pages: 496 pp (paperback edition)
- ISBN: 0-00-719891-4 (paperback edition)
- Preceded by: If You Could See Me Now
- Followed by: Thanks for the Memories

A Place Called Here is Irish writer Cecelia Ahern's fourth novel, published in 2006. The book was entitled "There's No Place Like Here" in the United States.

== Plot summary ==
Sandy Shortt has been obsessed with finding things which have been lost, since her childhood rival Jenny-May Butler went missing. Having worked for the Garda, the police force of Ireland, she left her job to start an agency which looks for missing people.

A man named Jack Ruttle asks Sandy for help looking for his younger brother Donal, who went missing the year before. She agrees, never expecting to become missing herself as she discovers the world where everything which has ever been lost goes to, a place called Here.

Jack goes on a search for Sandy believing that she is the key to finding his brother but learning more about her personal life than he should. Meanwhile, Sandy's possessions keep getting lost from Here but found in this world. Something is bound to happen but the both of them have yet to know what it is.

== Characters in "A Place Called Here" ==
- Sandy Shortt (The Main Character)

She was named Sandy because when she was born, her hair had the colour of sand. Although, they turned a coal-black colour as she grew. She is known to be a tall person, being 6'1", and because of this, her classmate Jenny-May bullied her and called her "daddy-longlegs".

She is obsessed with finding things ever since her classmate disappeared. It fascinates her and leaves her dissatisfied when something goes missing without a trace and she will spend as much time as she can to find it, resistant to buy new items to replace the ones she lost. She labels her possessions so she wouldn't lose them. She has a habit of coming and going as she pleases for her job which is the reason no one else than Jack searched for her in the duration she went missing.

After she has arrived to Here, she finds all her missing belongings but one by one, they go missing meaning they have been found in this world. This occurrence is kept a secret as it may result in chaos or false hope as it is believed that you cannot leave Here. She continues to live in Here, learning and being breathless due to meeting people she has searched for years. Even though told not to be, she remained positive and stubborn that she will go back home.

- Jenny-May Butler

Jenny-May is a childhood rival of Sandy and also a neighbour. She has been portrayed to be mean and a bully but when she went missing, she was the angelic little girl whose parents want to find her. She had blonde hair and blue eyes and would constantly tease Sandy about her height.

- Gregory Burton

Gregory was Sandy's psychiatrist whose Sandy's parents hired to help her through her obsessions. He is charming and the person Sandy trusted the most. However, their relationship bloomed into romance as an off/on relationship. He ends up getting his PhD and runs his own counselling called Scáthach's House.

- Jack Ruttle

Jack is one of Sandy's customers. His brother, Donal went missing last year. He found sandy's number and decides to give it a try. He spends nights talking on the phone with Sandy. On the day of their meeting, he bumps into Sandy but due to the fact that they've never met in person, he didn't know it was her.

After Sandy goes missing, he finds Sandy's car with her diary and cellphone inside. Dissatisfied, he starts searching for her even though he was discouraged and warned.

- Donal Ruttle

Jack Ruttle's younger brother who went missing.

- Bobby Duke

Is one of the people that Sandy wanted to find. He went missing when he was sixteen and is currently nineteen. She meets him at Here as a keeper of a lost and found. His given last name is Stanley.

He is one of the few people who knows about Sandy's secrets (Sandy running a missing persons agency, that her things are going missing, etc.). He is known to have an infectious high-pitch laugh.

== Reception ==
Glamour calls A Place Called Here 'a beautifully written love story.', with Marie Claire describing the ending as 'warm and cosy'. Review Centre gives the book 3.2/5 stars.
