= Thanks for the Memory (disambiguation) =

"Thanks for the Memory" is a song released in 1938 for the film The Big Broadcast of 1938.

Thanks for the Memory may also refer to:

- Thanks for the Memory (film), 1938 film whose title derives from the song
- Thanks for the Memory: The Great American Songbook, Volume IV, album by Rod Stewart
- "Thanks for the Memory" (Red Dwarf), television series episode
- "Thanks for the Memory (Wham Bam Thank You Mam)", 1975 single by Slade

Thanks for the Memories may also refer to:

- "Thnks fr th Mmrs", single released in 2007 by Fall Out Boy
- Thanks for the Memories (novel), 2008 book by Cecelia Ahern
- "Thanks for the Memories" (Grey's Anatomy), 2006 television series episode
- "Thanks for the Memories" (Grimm), 2014 television series episode
- Thanks for the Memories, 2019 British TV series starring Tamzin Merchant and Tom Wlaschiha

== See also ==
- Gratitude, the feeling of thankfulness
- Memory (disambiguation)
