= Sam Claflin =

British actor (born 1986)

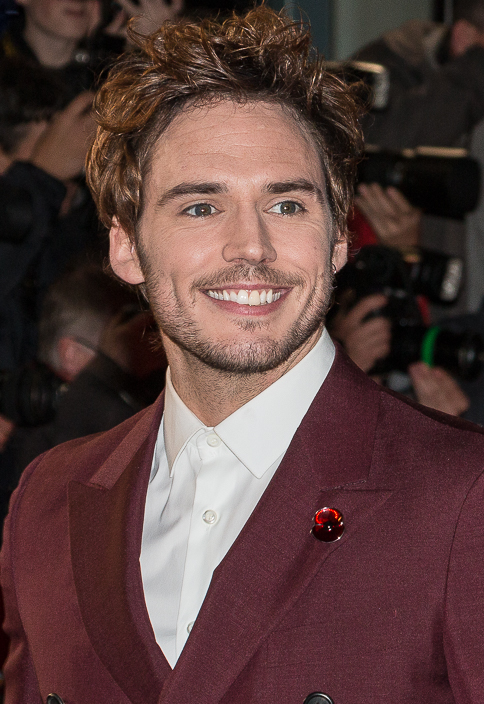
- Claflin in 2014
- Born: Samuel George Claflin; 27 June 1986 (age 40); Ipswich, Suffolk, England
- Education: London Academy of Music and Dramatic Art
- Occupation: Actor
- Years active: 2010–present
- Spouse: Laura Haddock (m. 2013; sep. 2019)
- Children: 2

Samuel George Claflin (/ˈklæflɪn/; born 27 June 1986) is a British actor. After graduating from the London Academy of Music and Dramatic Art in 2009, he began his acting career on television and had his first film role as Philip Swift in Pirates of the Caribbean: On Stranger Tides (2011).

Claflin gained wider recognition for playing Finnick Odair in The Hunger Games film series (2013–2015) and for his starring roles in the romantic films Love, Rosie (2014) and Me Before You (2016). He has since starred in the films Adrift (2018) and The Nightingale (2018), and portrayed Oswald Mosley in the television series Peaky Blinders (2019–2022), Mycroft Holmes in the mystery film Enola Holmes (2020), and singer Billy Dunne in the musical drama series Daisy Jones & the Six (2023). The last of these earned him a nomination for a Golden Globe Award. He starred in the title role in a French-Italian television adaptation ofThe Count of Monte-Cristo (2024).

== Early life ==
Samuel George Claflin was born on 27 June 1986 in Ipswich, Suffolk, England, to Mark, a finance officer, and Sue Claflin (née Clarke), a teaching assistant. He has two older brothers, Benjamin and Daniel, and a younger brother, Joseph (born 1989), who is also an actor. He grew up in Norwich, Norfolk.

As a child, he had an interest in football. He played throughout his childhood until he broke his ankle, an injury that he felt would prevent him from playing professionally. After some persuasion from his parents and a teacher upon whom he had made an impression during his high school play at Costessey High School, he pursued acting.

A member of the Norwich City School of Excellence, in 2003, he took up Performing Arts at Norwich City College. Claflin subsequently graduated from the London Academy of Music and Dramatic Art in 2009.

== Career ==
=== Beginnings and breakthrough (2010–2015) ===
Claflin made his acting debut in 2010, when he appeared in two television miniseries—in The Pillars of the Earth as Richard and in Any Human Heart as young Logan Mountstuart. In March 2011, he was cast as Thomas in Seventh Son, a film adaptation of The Spook's Apprentice, but was dropped for unknown reasons and was replaced by Ben Barnes. His next appearance came in April 2011, when he portrayed footballer Duncan Edwards in the BBC TV drama United, which was centred on the events of the 1958 Munich air disaster, in which Edwards died as a result of his injuries.

In April 2010, he was cast as Philip Swift, a missionary who falls in love with the mermaid Syrena (portrayed by Àstrid Bergès-Frisbey), in 2011's Pirates of the Caribbean: On Stranger Tides, the fourth instalment of the Pirates of the Caribbean film series. For the film, he received a nomination in the 17th Empire Awards for "Best Male Newcomer." In 2012, he appeared as Jack in the six-episode miniseries White Heat. Later that year, he played a supporting role in the 2012 film Snow White and the Huntsman, as William, Snow White's childhood friend. He received a nomination in the 2012 Teen Choice Awards for the category "Best Movie Breakout". Also in 2012, he was cast in the lead role in Hammer Films' The Quiet Ones, which was filmed in mid-2013 and was released in April 2014.

On 22 August 2012, Lionsgate announced that Claflin had been cast as Finnick Odair in The Hunger Games film series, starting with The Hunger Games: Catching Fire. The director of Catching Fire, Francis Lawrence, stated of Claflin's performance during filming: "Finnick's an interesting character. At first he feels like a bit of a flirt and there's a little bit of sexual tension, but really you kind of fall in love with the guy and you see that there's a real deep emotional side to him. It's one of the reasons I really hired him in the first place was that it's where his character goes in the next couple of stories and I just think he did a fantastic job." The film was released in November 2013 to general acclaim and Claflin's portrayal of Finnick received positive reviews. Claflin reprised the role in The Hunger Games: Mockingjay – Part 1, released in November 2014, and Part 2, released in November 2015.

In February 2013, it was announced that Claflin was cast as Alex in the film adaptation of Cecelia Ahern's novel Where Rainbows End, distributed as Love, Rosie in some territories. The following month, he starred in the TV film Mary and Martha as Ben, which was broadcast by BBC One. He received critical acclaim for his role as Oxford University student Alistair Ryle in the British dramatic thriller The Riot Club with Charlotte O'Sullivan of the London Evening Standard saying "Claflin captures his character's vitriol very well" and Laura Dibdin of Digital Spy saying "Claflin brings intrigue and vulnerability to offset the sense of entitlement thus making Alistair the film's most fascinating character". In 2014, Claflin also starred alongside Lily Collins and Suki Waterhouse in the romantic comedy drama film Love, Rosie, which was released to mixed reviews from critics but became a success among audiences.

=== From Me Before You to independent films and television (2016–present) ===
In 2016, Claflin reprised his role as William, Snow White's childhood friend, in several scenes of the sequel The Huntsman: Winter's War. The same year, he starred in Me Before You, the film adaptation of the novel of the same name, in which he played William Traynor. Claflin gained further critical acclaim for his role of Captain Stanhope in the war drama Journey's End (2017) and Adrift (2018).

In 2018, Claflin joined the fifth season of the BBC television drama Peaky Blinders, as the British fascist politician Oswald Mosley. In 2019, he starred in The Corrupted and the reboot of Charlie's Angels. In September 2020, he co-starred in the Netflix original film Enola Holmes as Mycroft Holmes, elder brother of the title character.

In 2023, Claflin played Billy Dunne in Daisy Jones & the Six. The story is based on a book of the same title and follows a rock band in the 1970s, and premiered on Amazon Prime Video on 3 March 2023. Claflin performed vocals on Aurora, the fictional album recorded by the band, which was released on 1 March 2023. In 2024, he starred in the title role in a French-Italian television adaptation of Alexandre Dumas's novel The Count of Monte-Cristo (set between 1844–1846).

== Personal life ==
In 2011, Claflin started dating actress Laura Haddock, whom he had met in an audition for My Week with Marilyn. The two married in July 2013 in a private ceremony. They have a son and a daughter. On 20 August 2019, Claflin and Haddock announced their legal separation. He has been in a relationship with Dar Zuzovsky since 2025.

== Filmography ==
Key
†	Denotes projects that have not yet been released

=== Film ===
Year	Title	Role	Notes	Ref.
2010	The Lost Future	Kaleb		
2011	United	Duncan Edwards	Television film	
2011	Pirates of the Caribbean: On Stranger Tides	Philip Swift		
2012	Snow White and the Huntsman	William		
2013	Mary and Martha	Ben O'Connell	Television film	
2013	The Hunger Games: Catching Fire	Finnick Odair		
2014	The Quiet Ones	Brian McNeil		
2014	The Riot Club	Alistair Ryle		
2014	Love, Rosie	Alex Stewart		
2014	The Hunger Games: Mockingjay – Part 1	Finnick Odair		
2015	The Hunger Games: Mockingjay – Part 2	Finnick Odair		
2016	The Huntsman: Winter's War	King William		
2016	Me Before You	William "Will" Traynor		
2016	Their Finest	Tom Buckley		
2017	My Cousin Rachel	Philip		
2017	Journey's End	Captain Stanhope		
2018	Adrift	Richard Sharp		
2018	The Nightingale	Hawkins		
2019	The Corrupted	Liam McDonagh		
2019	Red Shoes and the Seven Dwarfs	Merlin	Voice role	
2019	Charlie's Angels	Alexander Brok		
2020	Love Wedding Repeat	Jack		
2020	Enola Holmes	Mycroft Holmes		
2021	Every Breath You Take	James Flagg / Eric Dalton		
2021	Last Night in Soho	Punter #5		
2021	Charlotte	Alexander Nagler	Voice role	
2022	Book of Love	Henry Copper		
2024	Bagman	Patrick McKee		
2025	All the Devils Are Here	Grady		
2026	Ebenezer	Fred		
2027	F.A.S.T. †	TBA	Post-production	
TBA	The Last Days of Rabbit Hayes †	Davey	Post-production	
TBA	Watch the Skies †	TBA	Post-production	

=== Television ===
Year	Title	Role	Notes	Ref.
2010	The Pillars of the Earth	Richard, Earl of Shiring	Miniseries; 8 episodes	
2010	Any Human Heart	Younger Logan Mountstuart	Miniseries; 4 episodes	
2012	White Heat	Jack Walsh	Miniseries; 6 episodes	
2019	Peaky Blinders	Oswald Mosley	11 episodes (season 5-6)	
2023	Daisy Jones & the Six	Billy Dunne	Miniseries; 10 episodes	
2024	The Count of Monte Cristo	Edmond Dantès	Miniseries; 8 episodes; Also executive producer	
2025	Lazarus	Laz	Miniseries; 6 episodes; Also executive producer	
2026	Vanished	Tom	Miniseries; 4 episodes	

== Awards and nominations ==
Year	Award	Category	Work	Result	Ref
2012	Empire Awards	Best Male Newcomer	Pirates of the Caribbean: On Stranger Tides	Nominated	
2012	Movieguide Awards	Grace Award for Most Inspiring Performance	Pirates of the Caribbean: On Stranger Tides	Nominated	
2012	Teen Choice Awards	Choice Movie: Breakout	Snow White and the Huntsman	Nominated	
2014	Empire Awards	Best Supporting Actor	The Hunger Games: Catching Fire	Nominated	
2014	MTV Movie Awards	Best Shirtless Performance	The Hunger Games: Catching Fire	Nominated	
2014	MTV Movie Awards	Best Fight (with Jennifer Lawrence & Josh Hutcherson)	The Hunger Games: Catching Fire	Nominated	
2014	Teen Choice Awards	Choice Movie: Scene Stealer	The Hunger Games: Catching Fire	Nominated	
2014	Glamour Awards	Man of the Year	—	Won	
2014	Young Hollywood Awards	Breakthrough Actor	—	Nominated	
2016	Savannah Film Festival Awards	Spotlight Award	—	Won	
2016	Teen Choice Awards	Choice Movie: Liplock (shared with Emilia Clarke)	Me Before You	Nominated	
2017	MTV Movie & TV Awards	Tearjerker (with Emilia Clarke)	Me Before You	Nominated	
2018	Evening Standard British Film Awards	Best Actor	Journey's End	Nominated	
2018	Veterans Film Festival Awards	Red Poppy Award for Best Male Actor	Journey's End	Won	
2018	Teen Choice Awards	Choice Summer Movie Star: Male	Adrift	Nominated	
2019	Indiana Film Journalists Association Awards	Best Supporting Actor	The Nightingale	Nominated	
2020	Australian Film Critics Association Awards	Best Supporting Actor	The Nightingale	Won	
2023	MTV Movie & TV Awards	Best Kiss (with Riley Keogh)	Daisy Jones & the Six	Nominated	
2023	Hollywood Music in Media Awards	Best Original Song in a TV Show/Limited Series (with Blake Mills, Marcus Mumford & Riley Keough)	Daisy Jones & the Six	Nominated	
2024	Golden Globe Awards	Best Actor – Miniseries or Television Film	Daisy Jones & the Six	Nominated	
2024	Guild of Music Supervisors Awards	Best Song Written and/or Recorded for Television (with Jason Boesel, Blake Mills, Marcus Mumford, Johnathan Rice, Stephony Smith, Riley Keough, Suki Waterhouse, Will Harrison, Josh Whitehouse, Sebastian Chacon & Frankie Pine)	Daisy Jones & the Six	Won	
2024	Astra TV Awards	Best Actor in a Streaming Limited or Anthology Series or Movie	Daisy Jones & the Six	Nominated	
2026	Newport Beach Film Festival	Artist of Distinction	—	Won	
