= All the Devils Are Here (film) =

British thriller film

- Theatrical release poster
- Directed by: Barnaby Roper
- Screenplay by: John Patrick Dover
- Produced by: Leopold Hughes; Ben LeClair
- Starring: Sam Claflin; Eddie Marsan
- Cinematography: Peter Flinckenberg
- Edited by: Justin Krohn; Matt Nee
- Music by: Peter Raeburn
- Production companies: MRC; T-Street Productions
- Distributed by: Republic Pictures
- Release dates: August 19, 2025 (EIFF); September 26, 2025 (United States)
- Running time: 90 minutes
- Country: United States
- Language: English

All the Devils Are Here is a 2025 American thriller film starring Sam Claflin and Eddie Marsan.

It premiered at the Edinburgh International Film Festival on August 19, 2025.

== Premise ==
After a daring robbery, four criminals hide in a remote hideout, awaiting further orders. Soon, suspicions of loyalty beset the gang, and, as the more paranoia grows, the clearer one thing becomes—the real threat may not come from outside, but from one of them themselves.

== Cast ==
- Sam Claflin as Grady
- Eddie Marsan as Ronnie
- Burn Gorman as Numbers
- Tienne Simon as Royce
- Suki Waterhouse as C
- Rory Kinnear as Harold Laing

== Production ==
The film is directed by Barnaby Roper and written by John Patrick Dover. The cast is led by Sam Claflin and Eddie Marsan and also includes Burn Gorman, Tienne Simon, Suki Waterhouse and Rory Kinnear.

== Release ==
The film premiered at the Edinburgh International Film Festival on August 19, 2025. It then had a theatrical release in the United States on September 26, 2025.

== Reception ==
On the review aggregator website Rotten Tomatoes, 61% of 18 critics' reviews are positive.

Clint Worthington of RogerEbert.com wrote "That said, all this style is in service of a fairly formulaic story about volatile men going crazy at the edge of nowhere, with game performances only slightly elevating some fairly archetypal characters."
