= Mrs. Whippy =

Novella

- First edition (publ. New Island Books)
- Author: Cecelia Ahern
- Language: English
- Genre: Romance
- Publisher: New Island Books
- Publication date: 2006
- Publication place: Ireland
- Media type: Print

Mrs Whippy is a novella By Cecelia Ahern. It is the story of Emelda, a middle-aged housewife and mother. Her husband Charlie Holt (Mr Whippy) has left her for a younger woman (a 23-year-old dancer) and she is struggling to bring up her children. The book was written for charity and details Emelda's struggle to regain her self-esteem and get on with her life.

Her five difficult sons worship their father and blame Emelda for his leaving them. On top of everything else she has to struggle with a new job at the local supermarket where she ends up working with her eldest son's girlfriend. For comfort she turns to her one true friend – ice cream.

Emelda views most of the big moments in her life as being associated with ice cream, and the arrival of the Mr. Whippy ice cream van playing Greensleeves, on one of her darkest days brings her back to her childhood and leads her on the path to regaining her confidence and eventually taking on her husband.

== Theatre production ==
On 17 September 2008, it was announced that City Theatre Dublin, in conjunction with MCD, would be developing a stage version of Mrs. Whippy with former Glenroe actress Mary McEvoy in the lead role, set to run in Dublin's Liberty Hall Theatre in late October 2008. This is to be Cecelia Ahern's first work for the theatre.
