= Cecelia Ahern =

Irish novelist (born 1981)

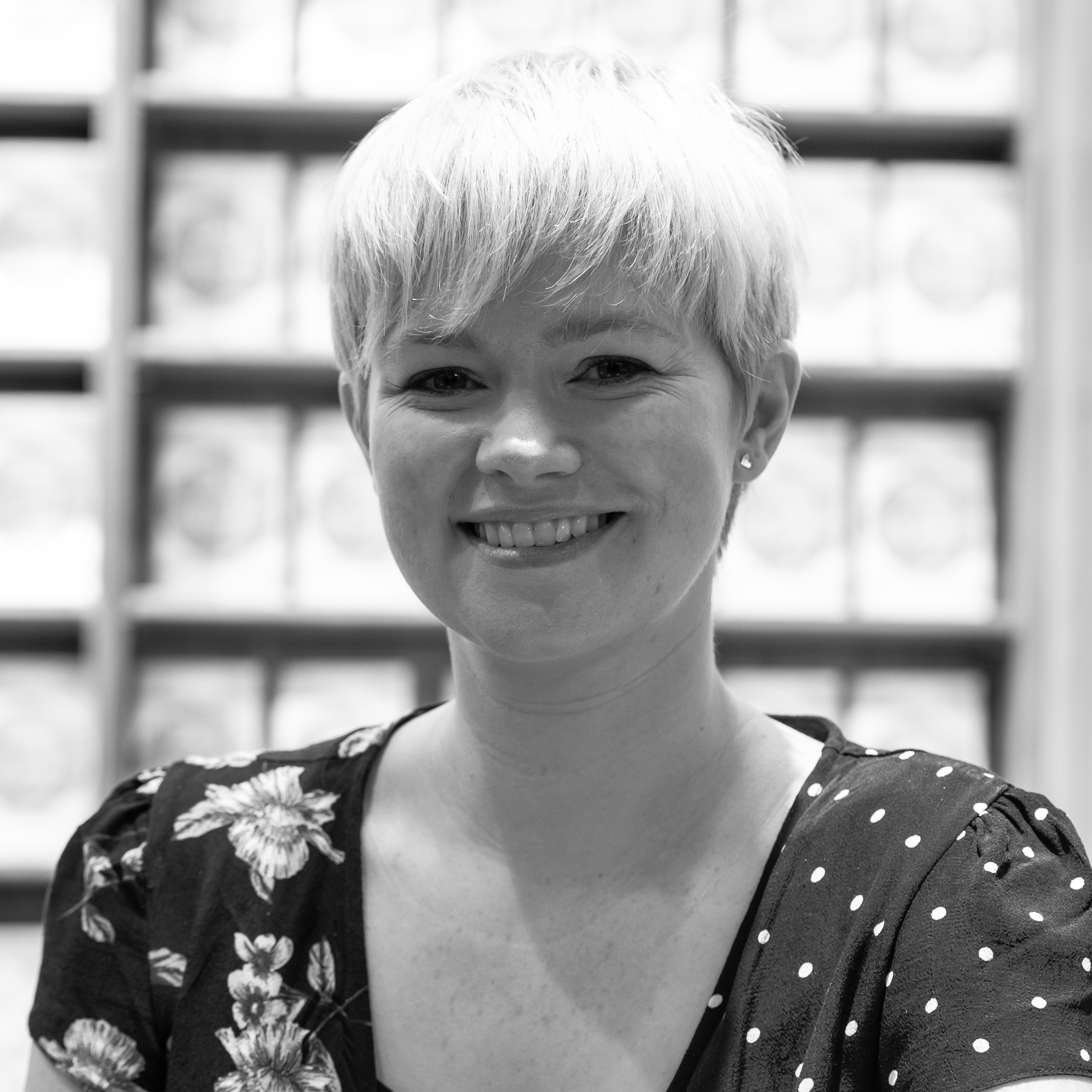
- Ahern in 2018
- Born: 30 September 1981 (age 44); Dublin, Ireland
- Education: Griffith College, Dublin
- Occupation: Novelist
- Spouse: David Keoghan (m. 2010)
- Children: 3
- Parent(s): Bertie Ahern (father); Miriam Ahern (mother)
- Writing career
- Period: 2002–present
- Genres: Romance; Young adult
- Notable works: PS, I Love You; Where Rainbows End; If You Could See Me Now
- Website: www.cecelia-ahern.com

Cecelia Ahern (born 30 September 1981) is an Irish novelist, known for her works like Where Rainbows End, If You Could See Me Now, and PS, I Love You. Born in Dublin, Ahern is published in nearly fifty countries, and has sold over 25 million copies of her novels worldwide. Two of her books have been adapted as motion films. The short story collection Roar has been adapted as a series for Apple TV+.

She and her books have won awards, including the Irish Book Award for Popular Fiction for The Year I Met You. She has published several novels and contributed short stories to various anthologies. Ahern also created and produced the ABC comedy Samantha Who? starring Christina Applegate.

== Education ==
Ahern obtained a degree in journalism and media communications from Griffith College Dublin, but withdrew from a master's degree course to pursue her writing career.

== Career ==
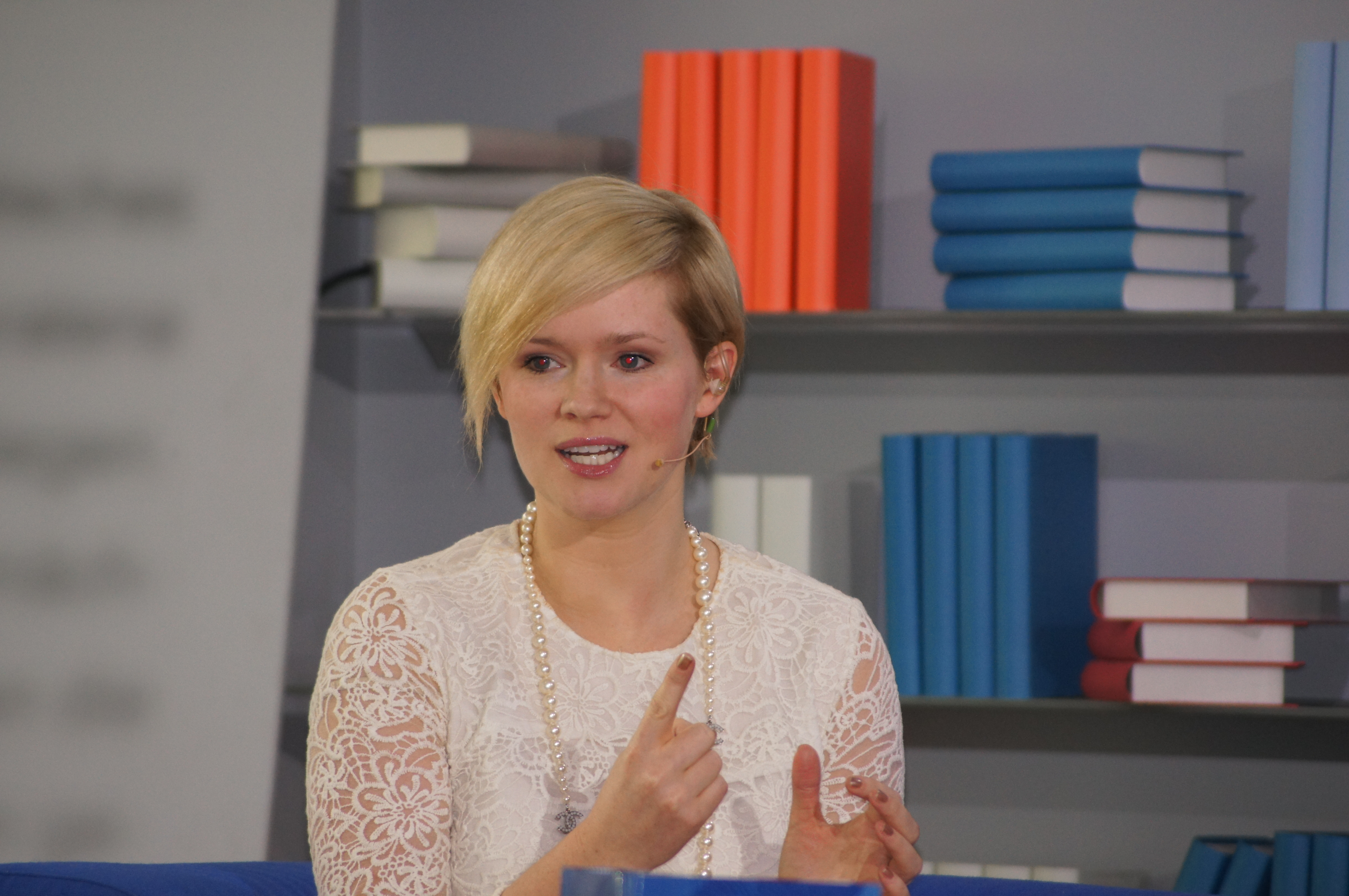
Ahern being interviewed during the 2011 Frankfurt Book Fair

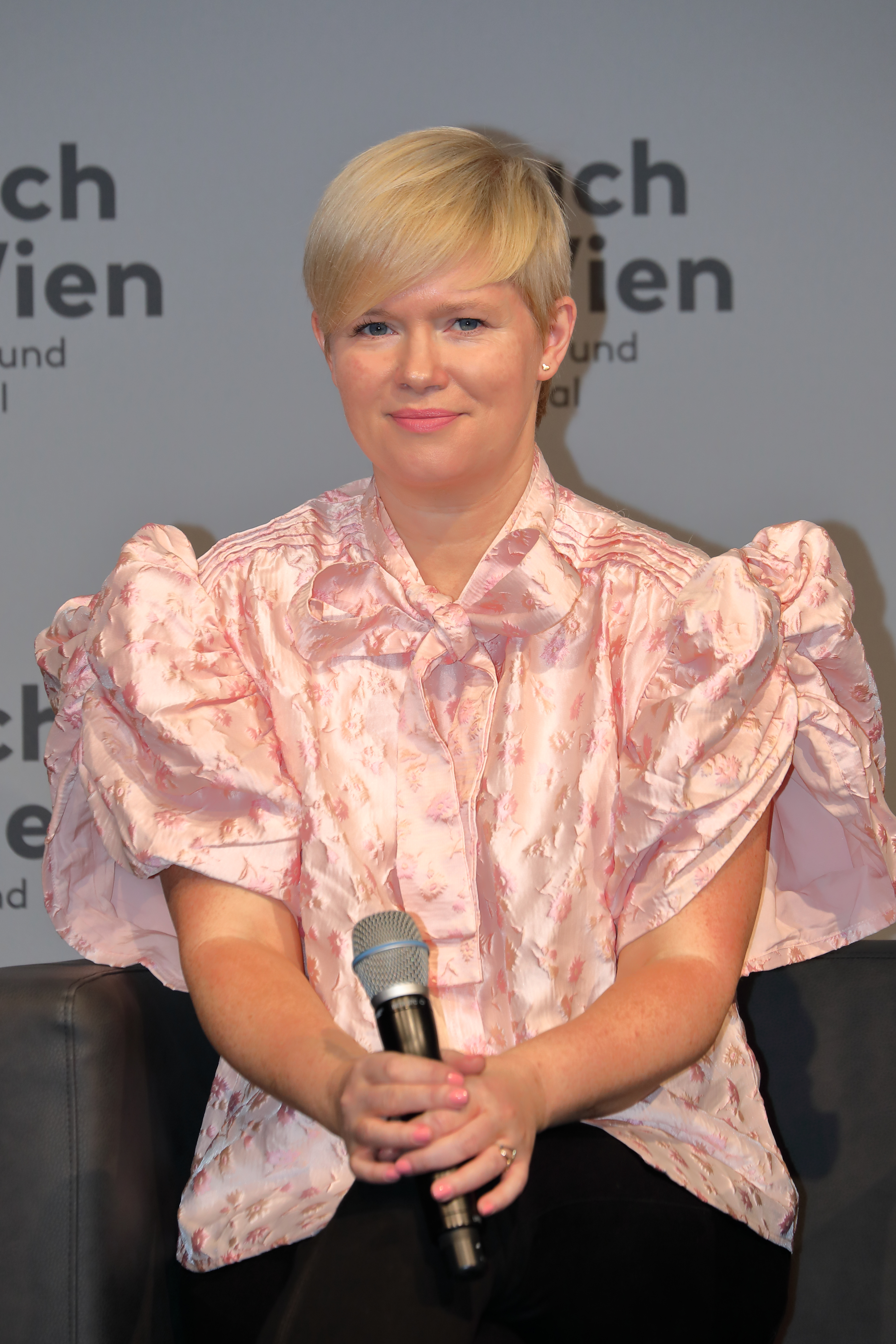
Cecelia Ahern at Buch Wien 2022

In 2002, when Ahern was twenty-one, she wrote her first novel, PS, I Love You. Published in 2004, it was the number 1 bestseller in Ireland (for 19 weeks), the United Kingdom, U.S., Germany and the Netherlands. It is sold in over forty countries. The book was adapted as a motion picture directed by Richard LaGravenese and starring Hilary Swank and Gerard Butler. It was released in the United States on 21 December 2007.

Her second book, Where Rainbows End (U.S. Love, Rosie), also reached number 1 in Ireland and the UK, and won the German CORINE Award in 2005. It was adapted as a motion picture titled Love, Rosie which was released in 2014, directed by Christian Ditter and starring Lily Collins and Sam Claflin.

She has contributed to charity books with the royalties from short stories such as Irish Girls are Back in Town and Ladies' Night.

Cecelia was the co-creator and producer of the ABC comedy Samantha Who? starring Christina Applegate, Jean Smart, Jennifer Esposito, Barry Watson, Kevin Dunn, Melissa McCarthy and Tim Russ.

Her book The Gift was published just before Christmas 2008 in the UK. Her following book, The Book of Tomorrow, was published on 1 October 2009. In 2016, Cecelia released Flawed, her first book for young adults, and Lyrebird.

== Awards and achievements ==
Cecelia was nominated for Best Newcomer 2004/5 at the British Book Awards for her debut novel PS, I Love You. She won the 2005 Irish Post Award for Literature and a 2005 Corine Literature Prize for her second book Where Rainbows End, (Für immer vielleicht) which was voted for by German readers. In 2006, she was long-listed for the IMPAC award for PS I Love You. Cosmopolitan US honoured her with a Fun Fearless Fiction Award 2007 for If You Could See Me Now. Irish Tatler awarded her Writer of the Year at the Woman of the Year awards in 2009. Cecelia's fifth novel Thanks for the Memories was nominated for Most Popular Book in the British Book Awards 2008. Cecelia was voted Author of Year in the UK Glamour Women of the Year Awards in 2008.

== Personal life ==
Ahern married David Keoghan in 2010. They have three children: a daughter born in December 2009, a son born in July 2012 and another daughter born in October 2019. As of 2015, they were residing in Malahide in North County Dublin.

Ahern is the daughter of former Taoiseach (prime minister) of Ireland, Bertie Ahern and Miriam Ahern. Her older sister, Georgina Ahern, is married to Nicky Byrne of Irish pop group Westlife. In 2000, Ahern was part of the Irish pop group Shimma, who finished third in the Irish national final for the Eurovision Song Contest.

== Bibliography ==
- PS, I Love You (2004)
- Where Rainbows End (2004)
- If You Could See Me Now (2005)
- A Place Called Here (2006)
- Thanks for the Memories (2008)
- The Gift (2008)
- The Book of Tomorrow (2009)
- The Time of My Life (2011)
- One Hundred Names (2012)
- How To Fall in Love (2013)
- The Year I Met You (2014)
- The Marble Collector (2015)
- Flawed (2016)
- Lyrebird (2016)
- Perfect (2017)
- Postscript (2019)
- Freckles (2021)
- In a Thousand Different Ways (2022)
- Into the Storm (2024)
- Paper Heart (2025)
- Love Unlocked (2026)

=== Short stories ===
- "24 Minutes" in Moments (2004)
- "Next Stop: Table For Two" in Short and Sweet (2005)
- "The Calling" in Irish Girls Are Back in Town (2005)
- Mrs. Whippy (2006)
- "The End" in Girls' Night In (2006)
- Girl in the Mirror (2010). Short story collection, containing the two stories "Girl in the Mirror" and "The Memory Maker".
- Roar (2018). Short story collection, containing thirty stories.

== Other work ==
=== Production Line for Express Magazine ===
- Every Year for "Harrod's Magazine"
- The Things That I Remember for "Woman's Own"
- Remembering Mum for "Express Magazine"
- Mallard and May for "Woman and Home"

=== Television work ===
- Samantha Who? (with Donald Todd)
- Zwischen Himmel und Hier (Between Heaven and Here) (for ZDF)
- Mein Ganzes Halbes Leben (My Whole Half Life) (for ZDF)

=== Film adaptations ===
- P.S. I Love You (2007)
- Love, Rosie (2014)
