= Roar (short story collection) =

Collection of short stories

- First edition
- Author: Cecelia Ahern
- Audio read by: Aisling Bea, Lara Sawalha, Adjoa Andoh
- Language: English
- Publisher: HarperCollins UK
- Publication date: October 2018
- Pages: 352
- ISBN: 978-0008283490

Roar is a 2018 short story collection written by Cecelia Ahern. Each story is a fable wherein Ahern pulls from contemporary gender dynamics to introduce a struggling woman and literalizes common clichés with magical realism, and by the end of the tale, the protagonist is empowered by a lesson or realization that allows them to overcome her oppression. The collection received positive reviews.

== Contents ==
1. "The Woman Who Slowly Disappeared"
2. "The Woman Who Was Kept on the Shelf"
3. "The Woman Who Grew Wings"
4. "The Woman Who Was Fed by a Duck"
5. "The Woman Who Found Bite Marks on Her Skin"
6. "The Woman Who Thought Her Mirror Was Broken"
7. "The Woman Who Was Swallowed Up by the Floor and Who Met Lots of Other Women Down There, Too"
8. "The Woman Who Ordered the Seabass Special"
9. "The Woman Who Ate Photographs"
10. "The Woman Who Forgot Her Name"
11. "The Woman Who Had a Ticking Clock"
12. "The Woman Who Sowed Seeds of Doubt"
13. "The Woman Who Returned and Exchanged Her Husband"
14. "The Woman Who Lost Her Common Sense"
15. "The Woman Who Walked in Her Husband's Shoes"
16. "The Woman Who Was a Featherbrain"
17. "The Woman Who Wore Her Heart on Her Sleeve"
18. "The Woman Who Wore Pink"
19. "The Woman Who Blew Away"
20. "The Woman Who Had a Strong Suit"
21. "The Woman Who Spoke Woman"
22. "The Woman Who Found the World in Her Oyster"
23. "The Woman Who Guarded Gonads"
24. "The Woman Who Was Pigeonholed"
25. "The Woman Who Jumped on the Bandwagon"
26. "The Woman Who Smiled"
27. "The Woman Who Thought the Grass Was Greener on the Other Side"
28. "The Woman Who Unraveled"
29. "The Woman Who Cherry-Picked"
30. "The Woman Who Roared"

== Reception ==
Kirkus Reviews called it "a sharp, breathtaking collection of fables." Ariel Balter at the New York Journal of Books found the collection to be a "great idea not very well executed" due to its lack of subtlety and nuance. Reviewing for The Irish Times, Martina Evans enjoyed the collection, but felt that the lessons could be more profound if each woman struggled a bit more before the happy ending resolution. Bethanne Patrick praised the collection for The Washington Post with a recommendation to read only one or two of the fables in a sitting in order to best appreciate them.

== Adaptation ==
In August 2018, before the collection was published, the stories were set to be adapted for TV. Apple TV+ picked up the series, and the series was released on April 15, 2022.
