= If You Could See Me Now (Ahern novel) =

2005 novel by Cecelia Ahern

- First edition cover
- Author: Cecelia Ahern
- Language: English
- Publisher: HarperCollins
- Publication date: November 2005
- Publication place: Ireland
- Media type: Print (Paperback)
- Pages: 336 pp (paperback edition)
- ISBN: 0-00-721225-9 (paperback edition)
- OCLC: 62204659
- Preceded by: Where Rainbows End
- Followed by: A Place Called Here

If You Could See Me Now (also known as A Silver Lining outside of the UK and Ireland) is Irish writer Cecelia Ahern's third novel, published in 2005. The story follows a romance between 34 year old Elizabeth and her romance with Ivan, an imaginary friend that is, in fact, real, but visible only to children and lonely people.

== Plot ==
In the small Irish town of Baile nagCroíth, Elizabeth Egan is an uptight single woman struggling to balance her job with taking care of her alcoholic younger sister, Saoirse, and Saoirse's six year old son, Luke. Elizabeth is exasperated with Luke's claims to have an imaginary friend called Ivan. Though invisible, Ivan is real and part of a magical community of effectively immortal "imaginary friends" that accompany those who need them. Pitying her, Ivan follows Elizabeth out of curiosity and is surprised when she is able to see him, despite being an adult. Elizabeth befriends Ivan, thinking him to be the father of one of Luke's friends and unaware nobody else can see him. Over the course of their relationship, Elizabeth learns to relax, treat life more lightly, and contemplate on her troubled childhood, while Ivan falls in love with her.

Opal, another imaginary friend, warns Ivan that all adults cease to see them eventually, and his relationship with Elizabeth is doomed. She takes him to see her own human ex-lover, bedridden in his 80s while Opal has stayed the same. Elizabeth's life, career, and relationships improve thanks to Ivan's company, and her happiness means she can no longer see him. Ivan visits Elizabeth one last time while she sleeps, explaining why he has to go. Elizabeth thinks it was a dream until she realizes Ivan was Luke's 'imaginary' friend. They go their separate ways, with Elizabeth changed for the better and Ivan happy to have met her.

== Reception ==
Despite mixed reviews, the book was a commercial success. Kirkus Reviews stated the book was, "insufferably whimsical, with a main character whose idea of fun is spinning around on chairs and speaking backwards."

In 2005, Disney acquired rights to adapt the novel into a musical with Hugh Jackman as Ivan. In December 2024, a film adaptation was announced, with Ansel Elgort cast as Ivan and Catherine Hardwicke set to direct from a script written by Catherine Cort. Shooting has started as of 2026.
