= PS, I Love You (novel) =

2004 novel by David Bradford

- First edition
- Author: Cecelia Ahern
- Language: English
- Genre: Romance
- Publisher: HarperCollins
- Publication date: 2004
- Publication place: Ireland
- Media type: Print (hardback & paperback)
- Pages: 655 pp (hardcover); 512 pp (paperback)
- ISBN: 0-7862-6164-1 (hardcover); ISBN 0-00-716500-5 (paperback)
- OCLC: 54374542
- Followed by: Where Rainbows End

PS, I Love You is the debut novel by Irish writer Cecelia Ahern, published in 2004. It claimed the number one best-seller status in Ireland, Britain, the United States, Germany, and the Netherlands, and was on the number one spot in Ireland for nineteen weeks.

== Plot ==
Holly and Gerry are a married couple who live in Dublin. They are deeply in love, but they fight occasionally. By winter that year, Gerry suddenly dies of a brain tumor and Holly realises how much he means to her as well as how insignificant their arguments were.

Deeply distraught, Holly withdraws from her family and friends out of grief until her mother calls her informing her of a package addressed to her. Within the package are ten envelopes, one for each month after Gerry died, containing messages from him, all ending with "P.S. I Love You". As the months pass, each new message fills her with encouragement and sends her on a new adventure. With Gerry's words as her guide, Holly slowly embarks on a journey of rediscovery.

== Characters ==
- Holly Kennedy: Gerry's wife, Sharon's best friend
- Gerry Clark: Holly's husband, John's best friend
- Sharon McCarthy: Holly's best friend, John McCarthy's wife
- John McCarthy: Gerry's best friend, Sharon McCarthy's husband
- Denise Hennessey: Holly and Sharon's best friend
- Tom O'Connor: Denise's husband
- Daniel Connolly: Holly's friend and suitor
- Elizabeth Kennedy: Holly's mother
- Frank Kennedy: Holly's father
- Richard Kennedy: Holly's older brother
- Meredith Kennedy: Richard's ex-wife
- Timothy "Timmy" Kennedy: Meredith and Richard's son
- Emily Kennedy: Meredith and Richard's daughter
- Jack Kennedy: Holly's brother
- Abbey Kennedy: Jack's wife
- Ciara Kennedy: Holly's sister
- Mathew: Ciara's boyfriend
- Declan Kennedy: Holly's brother
- Leo: Holly's hair stylist
- Chris Feeney: Holly's boss
- Alice Goodyear: Holly's colleague
- Laura: Daniel's former girlfriend
- Barbara: Travel agent
- Charlie: Bartender

== Reception ==
Despite the hype and commercial success, the debut novel from Cecilia Ahern, daughter of Irish political figure Bertie Ahern, drew negative reception. RTÉ gave it three out of five stars, stating that Ahern's book is "funny and emotional", but also criticising the book's message of getting over the death of a loved one by "getting drunk and shopping". The Guardian wrote a satirical review which lampooned Ahern's shallow characterisation and melodramatic plot. The Clare County library called the book "overhyped", "predictable" and "full of stock characters", but lastly an "easy read... and a nice holiday read". Amazon.co.uk calls it "at times repetitive and her delivery is occasionally amateurish [but] Ahern deserves credit for a spirited first effort".

== Movie adaptation ==
A film adaptation of the book was released in 2007 with Hilary Swank as Holly, and Gerard Butler as her husband, Gerry. James Marsters plays John McCarthy and Jeffrey Dean Morgan plays William Gallagher. The cast includes Kathy Bates, Harry Connick, Jr., Gina Gershon and Lisa Kudrow. Filming began in October 2006 in New York City and Ireland, and the movie was released on 21 December 2007 in the United States.

Although box office numbers were high, critics gave the film negative reviews.

== Sources ==
- PS, I Love You at IMDb
