= Love, Rosie (film) =

2014 romantic comedy-drama film

- British theatrical release poster
- Directed by: Christian Ditter
- Screenplay by: Juliette Towhidi
- Based on: Where Rainbows End by Cecelia Ahern
- Produced by: Robert Kulzer; Simon Brooks
- Starring: Lily Collins; Sam Claflin; Christian Cooke; Tamsin Egerton; Suki Waterhouse; Jamie Beamish; Jaime Winstone
- Cinematography: Christian Rein
- Edited by: Tony Cranstoun
- Music by: Ralph Wengenmayr
- Production companies: Constantin Film; Canyon Creek Films; Octagon Films
- Distributed by: Lionsgate (United Kingdom); Constantin Film (Germany)
- Release dates: 6 October 2014 (London); 22 October 2014 (United Kingdom); 30 October 2014 (Germany)
- Running time: 102 minutes
- Countries: United Kingdom; Germany
- Language: English
- Box office: $25.5 million

Love, Rosie is a 2014 romantic comedy-drama film directed by Christian Ditter from a screenplay by Juliette Towhidi, based on the 2004 novel Where Rainbows End by Irish author Cecelia Ahern. It stars Lily Collins and Sam Claflin as two childhood best friends turned lovers who are separated by circumstances following their high school graduation. Christian Cooke, Tamsin Egerton, Suki Waterhouse, Jamie Beamish and Jaime Winstone also appear in supporting roles. The film addresses themes such as teen pregnancy, adoption, grief and adultery.

Love, Rosie had its world premiere in London on 6 October 2014, before its theatrical release on 22 October 2014. Though the film was received poorly by critics, it garnered positive reviews from audiences and grossed $25.5 million worldwide. Collins' performance was singled out for praise by both critics and audiences.

== Plot ==
Alex and Rosie are childhood best friends. During Rosie's eighteenth birthday party, Alex kisses her whilst they are drunk, and realizes that he has feelings for her. The next day, while nursing a hangover and having had her stomach pumped, Rosie regrets having got drunk, and tells Alex that she wishes that the night had never happened. He interprets her words as Rosie just wanting to be friends, not realising that Rosie had no recollection of the night before.

Greg, the "fittest guy in their year", asks Rosie to the school dance. She originally intended to go with Alex, but accepts Greg's offer after learning that Alex is thinking about going with Bethany, the popular girl in their year. After the dance, Rosie has sex with Greg, but the condom slips off inside her.

Rosie aspires to one day run her own hotel, inspired by her father who works in a hotel as a valet, so applies and gets accepted to a hotel management course at Boston College. She rushes to tell Alex but finds him having sex with Bethany, which causes her to vomit.

Rosie discovers that she is pregnant but refuses to tell Alex, fearing that he will forgo his chance to study at Harvard to help take care of her. After he leaves for the United States, she gives birth to a daughter, whom she names Katie. Alex learns of Rosie's pregnancy from Bethany, after Rosie runs into her with Katie, and he becomes the godfather.

Five years later, Rosie visits Alex in Boston and they spend the night talking and visiting places. The following morning, she discovers that his girlfriend, Sally, is pregnant. She criticizes Alex's living situation and tries to discuss it with him but he rebuffs her, saying that at least their child will have both parents.

Rosie leaves Boston infuriated. She reconciles with Greg, who had initially fled to Ibiza upon learning of her pregnancy, and they marry in 2009. Later, Rosie learns that Alex split from Sally after discovering that the baby was not his. She bumps into Bethany, now a famous model, and suggests that she look up Alex on an upcoming trip to the US.

Five years later, Rosie's father dies from a heart attack whilst on vacation with Rosie's mother. Alex attends the funeral and reconciles with Rosie. Meanwhile, Greg gets drunk and causes a scene. This prompts Alex to write Rosie a note saying that she deserves better and that he can be that better man. However, Greg intercepts the note and hides it from her.

Later, Rosie discovers that Greg is cheating on her and kicks him out. While disposing of his things, she finds Alex's letter. She calls him, but discovers that Bethany is living with him now and they are engaged. They invite Rosie to be the "best man" at their wedding.

Rosie plots to interrupt the wedding, but fails, as the church ceremony is over by the time she arrives due to weather interrupting flights. At the reception, she gives a speech, telling Alex that she will always love him, as a friend. Katie brings her best friend Toby with her to the wedding. Their friendship is reminiscent of Rosie and Alex's when they were children.

During a dance, Toby kisses Katie, who pushes him away and runs outside. Rosie and Alex follow to comfort her. Alex tells Katie that she might regret pushing Toby away, and that he might never recover and never find someone to replace her. That scene is like a reply to Rosie's speech, he tells Katie that if you push Toby away right now he will spend his whole life searching for the most perfect girl, to convince himself that he loves her. He tells Katie that if you push Toby away he will search for you in every girl he meets just to love her. Rosie listens to everything and realizes the truth but for them (Alex and Rosie), it's too late now. Toby then finds Katie and apologizes for what he did. As he asks her to forget what just happened, Katie kisses him.

In that moment, Alex learns that Rosie does not remember the kiss that they shared on her eighteenth birthday. He realizes that he had been mistaken in interpreting her desire to forget that night as her wanting to stay platonic.

Using her inheritance from her father, Rosie fulfills her ambition of starting her own hotel. Alex is her second guest. When he arrives, Alex reveals that he ended his marriage with Bethany, and shares with her a recurring dream he has had about the two of them being together. Rosie and Alex then kiss.

== Production ==
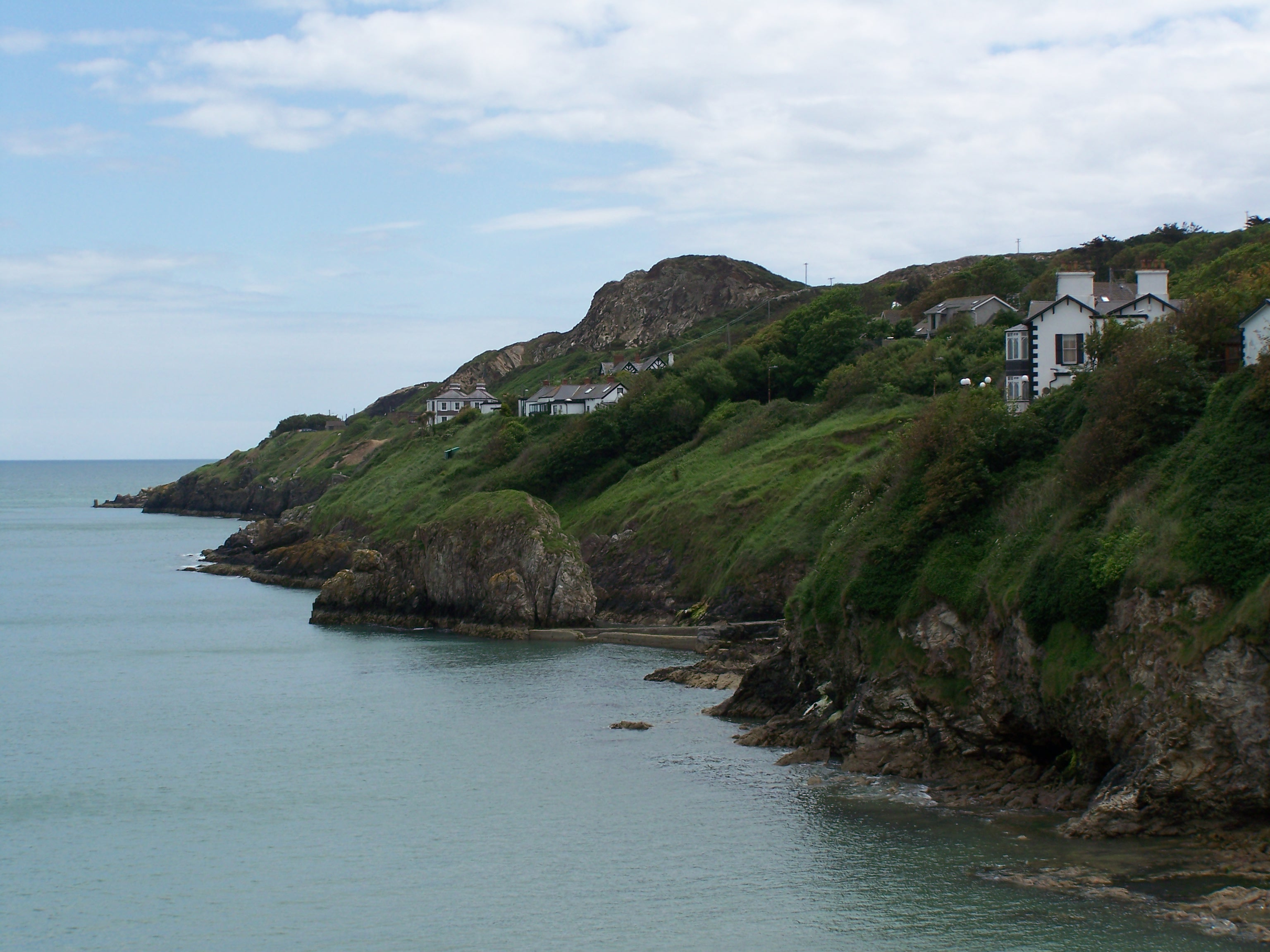
Coast of Howth with Tara Hall at the left where filming took place

Filming began in May 2013 in Toronto before moving to Dublin and Howth.

== Cast ==
- Lily Collins as Rosie Dunne
  - Beau Rose Garratt as Rosie (6 years old)
  - Lara McDonnell as Rosie (10 years old)
- Sam Claflin as Alex Stewart
  - Tighe Wardell as Alex (6 years old)
  - Tom John Kelly as Alex (10 years old)
- Tamsin Egerton as Sally
- Suki Waterhouse as Bethany Williams
- Jaime Winstone as Ruby
- Christian Cooke as Greg
- Lily Laight as Katie Dunne
  - Rosa Molloy as Katie (5 years old)
- Matthew Dillon as Toby (12 years old)
  - Aaron Kinsella as Toby (5 years old)
- Nick Lee as Herb
- Nick Hardin Joe American (Unused footage)
- Jamie Beamish as Phil
- Art Parkinson as Gary Dunne

== Reception ==
Love, Rosie received negative reviews from critics. On Rotten Tomatoes, the film has an approval rating of 32% based on reviews from 57 critics, with an average rating of 4.7/10. The site's consensus states: "Lilly Collins and Sam Claflin are appealing, and they give it their all, but they're undone by Love, Rosie's silly, clichéd storyline." On Metacritic, the film has a score of 44 out of 100 based on reviews from 16 critics, indicating "mixed or average reviews".

Donald Clarke of The Irish Times described Collins as "perfectly charming", but felt that "entire film is weighed down by such sloppy storytelling and by equally disordered characterisation" and gave the film one out of five stars calling it awful, but pretty.
