= Miriam Ahern =

Irish charity patron (born 1954)

- Born: Miriam Kelly; 1 March 1954 (age 72); Dublin, Ireland
- Occupation: Charity patron
- Spouse: Bertie Ahern (m. 1975; sep. 1992)
- Children: Georgina; Cecelia

Miriam Ahern (née Kelly; born 1 March 1954) is an Irish charity patron, the former spouse of Irish Taoiseach Bertie Ahern and mother of author Cecelia Ahern.

== Charity work ==
Ahern is a patron of CARI, a child therapy and counselling organisation.

== Personal life ==
Miriam married Fianna Fáil politician Bertie Ahern in St. Columba's Church, Iona Road in 1975. They had two children, Georgina, who would marry Westlife's Nicky Byrne, and Cecelia, an author and screenwriter. Their separation in 1992, was thought by commentators to have affected his party leadership prospects in that year, ultimately choosing not to oppose Albert Reynolds. The circumstances of their separation, and the lack of a personal bank account for the then Minister for Finance was the subject of political turmoil during the final year of Bertie's term as Taoiseach.
