= Thanks for the Memories (novel) =

2008 novel by Cecelia Ahern

- First edition
- Author: Cecelia Ahern
- Language: English
- Genre: Romance novel
- Publisher: Harper
- Publication date: 28 August 2008
- Media type: Print; digital
- Pages: 512
- ISBN: 978-0061729010
- Website: Author page

Thanks for the Memories is a 2008 novel by Cecelia Ahern.

== Plot summary ==
A blood transfusion saves Joyce Conway’s life. After she wakes up, she finds that she has memories and knowledge that she did not possess before her accident. As she deals with her impending divorce and a miscarriage, Joyce encounters a handsome American, Justin. Joyce and Justin are drawn to each other. What is this magical connection?
