= Where Rainbows End =

2004 novel by Cecelia Ahern

- First edition cover
- Author: Cecelia Ahern
- Language: English
- Publisher: HarperCollins
- Publication date: 2004
- Publication place: Ireland
- Media type: Print (Paperback)
- Pages: 592 pp (paperback edition)
- ISBN: 0-00-716501-3 (paperback edition)
- OCLC: 57750790
- Dewey Decimal: 823.92 22
- LC Class: PR6101.H47 W47 2005
- Preceded by: PS, I Love You
- Followed by: If You Could See Me Now

Where Rainbows End (also known as Love, Rosie or Rosie Dunne outside of the UK) is the second novel by Irish writer Cecelia Ahern, published in 2004. The entire novel is written in epistolary structure in the form of letters, emails, instant messages, and newspaper articles. The book reached number one in Ireland and UK and was a best seller internationally. The book won the German Corine Award in 2005. In 2014, the novel was adapted into a film titled Love, Rosie.

== Synopsis ==
Where Rainbows End is a story told through letters, emails and instant messaging about the ever-changing relationship between the two main characters Rosie Dunne and Alex Stewart. Rosie and Alex are close friends from childhood but one day they are suddenly separated when Alex and his family move from Dublin to Boston. The book guides us through their relationship as it continues to change due to distance, new relationships and circumstances which seem determined to keep them apart. One question remains throughout the book, were they always meant to be more than friends and will they risk everything including their friendship on love?

== Characters ==
- Rosie Dunne: One of the main characters who lives in Dublin with her daughter Katie and has always dreamed of working in a hotel. The book follows her relationship with best friend Alex as distance and circumstances are forever testing their friendship. Rosie begins to question whether she was always meant to be more than friends with Alex and these feelings soon begin to take effect on their friendship.
- Alex Stewart: The other main character of the book, originally from Dublin where he grew up with Rosie, his family moves to Boston where Alex eventually becomes a surgeon. Alex gets married there, but later discovers that he has feelings for Rosie.
- Phil Stewart: One of the minor characters of the book and is Alex's brother. The two often communicate via email and Phil is always giving Alex advice about love and his friendship with Rosie.
- Sally Gruber: Sally meets Alex in Boston and the pair fall in love and get married and have a son together called Josh. Soon their relationship begins having problems.
- Greg Collins: A minor character in the book who marries Rosie. It soon becomes apparent that Greg is not right for Rosie and he is unfaithful to her.
- Katie Dunne: Rosie's daughter, Katie has a best friend in the book called Toby and their relationship mirrors the relationship that Alex and Rosie had as children. As she gets older her relationship with Toby changes and it teaches Rosie about her real feelings for Alex.
- Toby Quinn: Katie's best friend and their relationship is very similar to the relationship Alex and Rosie had as children. Toby and Katie lose touch and meet after several years where they realize they were always meant to be more than friends.
- Brian: Katie's father who comes back into her life midway through the book. He went to school with Rosie and Alex.
- Ruby: Ruby is best friends with Rosie after they meet working in an office for a stationery company. Ruby is always on hand to offer Rosie advice when she is unsure of her feelings in life and love.
- Mrs. Julie Casey: Also known as "Mrs. Big Nose Smelly Breath Casey" by Rosie and Alex. Towards the middle of the story Rosie, after quitting her job, goes to work at her old primary school as a receptionist and the two become friends.
- Bethany Williams: Alex's second wife. She was his first girlfriend in high school, but were reunited years later. They have a son named Theo. Rosie never liked her.
- Dennis Dunne: Rosie's father.
- Alice Dunne: Rosie's mother.
- Stephanie Dunne: Rosie's older sister.
- Kevin Dunne: Rosie's younger brother.

== Reception ==
Publishers Weekly commented stating that "the novel endears despite its flaws, thanks to Rosie and our endless appetite for stories of love finally requited."

While a reviewer for The Guardian wrote: "overall this is a clever novel with bright, entertaining characters and is perfect for any older readers looking for a bittersweet love story."

== Film adaptation ==
A film adaptation of the book was released in October 2014. It was directed by Christian Ditter, and stars Lily Collins as Rosie Dunne and Sam Claflin as Alex Stewart.
