= Roar (2022 TV series) =

American anthology television series

- Promotional poster
- Genre: Anthology; Black comedy; Drama
- Created by: Liz Flahive; Carly Mensch
- Based on: Roar by Cecelia Ahern
- Composer: Isobel Waller-Bridge
- Country of origin: United States
- Original language: English
- No. of episodes: 8

Production
- Executive producers: Liz Flahive; Carly Mensch; Nicole Kidman; Per Saari; Bruna Papandrea; Steve Hutensky; Allie Goss; Cecelia Ahern; Theresa Park; Jodi Matterson; Issa Rae
- Producers: Leanne Moore; Barbara Gibbs
- Cinematography: Chris Manley; Sam Chiplin; Quyen Tran
- Editors: Joseph Ettinger; William Turro; Tyler L. Cook
- Running time: 29–37 minutes
- Production companies: Blossom Films; Made Up Stories; Greenlight Go Productions; Per Capita Productions; Endeavor Content

Original release
- Network: Apple TV+
- Release: April 15, 2022

Roar is an American anthology television series from Liz Flahive and Carly Mensch, the creators of GLOW. Based on the 2018 short story collection of the same name by Cecelia Ahern, the 8-episode series premiered on Apple TV+ on April 15, 2022.

== Premise ==
Each story in the collection is about women's experiences and how women navigate through others' perceptions of them as well as their own. Highlighting what it means to be a woman, these stories are considered "darkly comic feminist fables."

== Production ==
=== Development ===
Roar was announced in August 2018, with the news that GLOW creators Liz Flahive and Carly Mensch were showrunning the TV series being developed based on Cecelia Ahern's short story collection Roar, published in the UK in November 2018 and in the US in April 2019. The project would be produced by Nicole Kidman and Per Saari's Blossom Films, Bruna Papandrea's Made Up Stories, and Theresa Park. Additionally, Ahern's Greenlight Go Productions and Endeavor Content were also attached to produce.

On March 2, 2021, it was announced that the show will air on Apple TV+ as eight 30-minute episodes each told from a female point of view, which mark Flahive’s and Mensch's first project under their new overall deal with the streamer.

=== Casting ===
The casting of Nicole Kidman, Cynthia Erivo, Merritt Wever, and Alison Brie was announced on March 2, 2021. In August 2021, Betty Gilpin, Meera Syal, Fivel Stewart, and Kara Hayward joined the cast.

=== Filming ===
Production for Roar began in Los Angeles, California on May 28, 2021, and concluded on August 1, 2021. So Yong Kim, Rashida Jones, Quyen Tran and Anya Adams directed episodes of the series.

== Episodes ==
No.	Title	Directed by	Written by
1	"The Woman Who Disappeared"	Channing Godfrey Peoples	Teleplay by : Janine Nabers
Cast: Issa Rae, Griffin Matthews, Lauren E. Banks, Nick Kroll
2	"The Woman Who Ate Photographs"	Kim Gehrig	Liz Flahive
Cast: Nicole Kidman, Judy Davis, Simon Baker
3	"The Woman Who Was Kept on a Shelf"	So Yong Kim	Liz Flahive & Carly Mensch
Cast: Betty Gilpin, Daniel Dae Kim
4	"The Woman Who Found Bite Marks on Her Skin"	Rashida Jones	Liz Flahive & Carly Mensch
Cast: Cynthia Erivo, Jake Johnson, P. J. Byrne, Taylor Nichols
5	"The Woman Who Was Fed By a Duck"	Liz Flahive	Teleplay by : Halley Feiffer
Cast: Merritt Wever, Justin Kirk, Riki Lindhome, Jason Mantzoukas
6	"The Woman Who Solved Her Own Murder"	Anya Adams	Liz Flahive & Carly Mensch
Cast: Alison Brie, Hugh Dancy, Christopher Lowell, Ego Nwodim, Jillian Bell
7	"The Woman Who Returned Her Husband"	Quyen Tran	Teleplay by : Vera Santamaria
Cast: Meera Syal, Bernard White, Julie White, Peter Facinelli, Rizwan Manji
8	"The Girl Who Loved Horses"	So Yong Kim	Carly Mensch
Cast: Fivel Stewart, Kara Hayward, Alfred Molina

== Release ==
All eight episodes of Roar were released on April 15, 2022.

== Reception ==
=== Critical response ===
The review aggregator website Rotten Tomatoes reported a 71% approval rating with an average rating of 6.3/10, based on 34 critic reviews. The website's critics consensus reads, "The feminist themes of Roar don't carry smoothly across some installments, but the sheer amount of talent on hand comes through loud and clear." Metacritic, which uses a weighted average, assigned a score of 57 out of 100 based on 13 critics, indicating "mixed or average" reviews.

=== "The Woman Who Was Fed By a Duck" ===
In May 2022, the British TV show Gogglebox featured a scene from the fifth episode "The Woman Who Was Fed By a Duck" wherein the duck rapes or performs a sex act on the woman. The broadcast of this scene resulted in over 200 complaints to the broadcasting regulator, Ofcom.
