= List of GLOW episodes =

GLOW is an American comedy-drama television series created by Liz Flahive and Carly Mensch for Netflix. The series revolves around a fictionalization of the characters and gimmicks of the 1980s syndicated women's professional wrestling circuit, the Gorgeous Ladies of Wrestling (or GLOW) founded by David McLane.

The first season consists of 10 episodes and was released on June 23, 2017. On August 10, 2017, Netflix renewed the series for a second season of 10 episodes, which premiered on June 29, 2018. The series was renewed on August 20, 2018 for a third season, which premiered on August 9, 2019. On September 20, 2019, the series was renewed for a fourth and final season. However, in October 2020, that decision was reversed by Netflix, and the final season was canceled due to the COVID-19 pandemic.

== Series overview ==
| Season | Episodes | Originally released |
|---|---|---|
| 1 | 10 | June 23, 2017 |
| 2 | 10 | June 29, 2018 |
| 3 | 10 | August 9, 2019 |

== Episodes ==
=== Season 1 (2017) ===
| No. overall | No. in season | Title | Directed by | Written by | Original release date |
|---|---|---|---|---|---|
| 1 | 1 | "Pilot" | Jesse Peretz | Liz Flahive & Carly Mensch | June 23, 2017 |
In 1985, Ruth Wilder is an actress struggling to find work who receives an invitation for an audition from her casting director. She arrives at an old boxing gym, where she and dozens of other women are auditioning for Gorgeous Ladies of Wrestling (GLOW). On the first day of tryouts, Ruth is dismissed by director Sam Sylvia when her acting skills come into conflict with the training; her day worsens when her purse is snatched by a group of skateboarders. With nowhere else to go, she begins watching professional wrestling videos to develop her persona and returns to the gym for another shot at the audition. Things go awry when her best friend Debbie Eagan confronts her after discovering that she has been having an affair with her husband Mark. Their legitimate catfight in the ring inspires Sam to keep Ruth in the program.
| 2 | 2 | "Slouch. Submit." | Wendey Stanzler | Liz Flahive & Carly Mensch | June 23, 2017 |
During the second week of tryouts, Sam tests the candidates' personalities. He then leaves the training to Cherry Bang while he goes out to try and get Debbie to be the star of his promotion. Tensions arise in the ring when Melrose reveals Cherry's previous affair with Sam and Cherry locks her in a sleeper hold. Melrose further mocks Cherry by faking a miscarriage with a bottle of ketchup. Sam uses the incident and Ruth's affair with Mark to brainstorm on a storyline in the ring. At the end of the day, Sam promises Cherry double her pay if the promotion pulls through. Ruth discovers that Sam will cast her as Debbie's evil arch-nemesis, much to her chagrin.
| 3 | 3 | "The Wrath of Kuntar" | Claire Scanlon | Nick Jones | June 23, 2017 |
The ladies meet their producer Sebastian "Bash" Howard while Sam hands them a script for them to work on, with Ruth reading stage directions. After the script reading session, Bash invites everyone to a party at his Malibu mansion, with Debbie riding in his helicopter. There, Bash brings the ladies to his dressing room to help them further develop their in-ring personas while Ruth puts a drunk Debbie in a taxi back home. As the ladies flaunt their new outfits, Sam and Bash argue over the direction they want the promotion to go. Following the argument, Sam agrees to work with Bash's vision of giving the girls stereotypical gimmicks. The girls pass on their persona tests except for Ruth, who leaves Sam and Bash clueless over her character.
| 4 | 4 | "The Dusty Spur" | Melanie Mayron | Sascha Rothchild | June 23, 2017 |
With five weeks left before shooting GLOW's pilot episode, Sam and Bash announce that the ladies will stay at The Dusty Spur motel in Van Nuys as part of their training. As Ruth struggles to find her character, she is assigned to work with Sheila the She-Wolf. Training is interrupted by Carmen's father Goliath Jackson and her two brothers, who urge her to go home instead of pursuing a wrestling career. After Goliath slaps Sam, Carmen agrees to leave the gym, but Bash fakes an affair with her to convince Goliath to let Carmen make her own decisions. The ladies and Cherry's husband Keith watch one of Sam's old horror films, only to discover his find-a-date video recorded over it. Meanwhile, Ruth gets into an argument with Sheila after discovering a dead squirrel in her bed while Debbie moves into the motel after another quarrel with Mark.
| 5 | 5 | "Debbie Does Something" | Phil Abraham | Rachel Shukert | June 23, 2017 |
As the ladies continue their training, Sam and Bash have a meeting with K-DTV executive Glen Klitnick, who offers GLOW a Saturday morning timeslot and a potential sponsor in the form of indoor/outdoor lifestyle store chain Patio Town. Debbie has her parents take care of her son while she continues her training. Dawn and Stacey spend the night making prank calls to everyone in the motel while Justine is heavily attracted to pizza delivery boy Billy Offal. Ruth and Rhonda travel to Patio Town's new Calabasas branch to meet CEO Patrick O'Towne, who declines to sponsor GLOW until Sam convinces him to reconsider by staging a vignette with Ruth during the ribbon cutting ceremony. It is here that Ruth develops her Soviet gimmick, but shortly after she learns of Sam's affair with Rhonda. Meanwhile, Melrose joins Debbie and Carmen to watch a local wrestling show, where Debbie discovers the thin line between wrestling and soap operas.
| 6 | 6 | "This Is One of Those Moments" | Kate Dennis | Jenji Kohan | June 23, 2017 |
Sam calls in Ruth and Debbie early morning at the gym to build them both as main eventers. Ruth sells an idea for the match, but Debbie walks out, still refusing to work with her former best friend. To further develop her character, Ruth asks for help from Gregory, the motel's Russian manager, who takes her to a Russian Jewish family party. When Michael, the bris celebrant, overhears Ruth talking about Yentl, he asks her to sing one of Barbra Streisand's songs. Meanwhile, Debbie is having difficulty taking in-ring storylines while Justine confronts Sam over him using GLOW as his personal casting couch. After much convincing by Sam, Debbie finally decides to start a program with Ruth. Later that night, Justine sneaks into Sam's office and steals his camera.
| 7 | 7 | "Live Studio Audience" | Jesse Peretz | Rachel Shukert | June 23, 2017 |
As the ladies gear up for their first show on Friday, Sam and Bash argue over production costs, especially after Sam's camera was stolen. In order to make the best possible main event, Ruth and Debbie begin training with Carmen's brothers. Meanwhile, Sam discovers that Rhonda found his camera in her locker, but he knows that Justine was trying to frame her. On the night of the show, Carmen experiences stage fright and passes out after leaving the gym. The scheduled tag team match goes awry when Dawn and Stacey wear Ku Klux Klan outfits in the ring. After coming to, Carmen discovers that Bash has been cut off financially by his mother after spending over $600,000 on developing GLOW. Debbie and Ruth's training pays off as they both get over the crowd on their main event, but Debbie suddenly walks out of the match when she sees Mark and argues with him backstage before he hands her the divorce papers. Rhonda saves the show by getting the other ladies to rap with her in the ring.
| 8 | 8 | "Maybe It's All the Disco" | Sian Heder | Nick Jones | June 23, 2017 |
Sam takes Ruth to the Mayan Theater as a potential venue for GLOW's next show. Mark admits to Debbie that he never meant to serve the divorce paper to her and that he has been taking therapy sessions to help fix their marriage. Meanwhile, the ladies celebrate Sheila's birthday by taking her to a roller disco, Rhonda breaks up with Sam, and Ruth secretly undergoes an abortion after her pregnancy test comes out positive.
| 9 | 9 | "The Liberal Chokehold" | Lynn Shelton | Liz Flahive & Carly Mensch | June 23, 2017 |
While most of America is focused on the TWA Flight 847 hijacking, K-DTV executives present Sam and Bash the timeslot for GLOW (following Dr. Gene Scott, a 1970s staple of KHOF-TV), but Sam discovers that Bash is strapped for cash. In order to raise the $9,000 to secure the venue, the ladies host a bikini car wash at the motel. When they collect only $287 and change from their car wash, Bash brings them to his mother's anti-drug charity event to speak as former drug addicts using wrestling as a reformation tool. Their act convinces Bash's mother to allow them to use their ballroom at the Hayworth Hotel. Meanwhile, after confiding with Justine over his failed projects, including the loss of the venue reservation, Sam discovers that she is his illegitimate daughter.
| 10 | 10 | "Money's in the Chase" | Tristram Shapeero | Liz Flahive & Carly Mensch | June 23, 2017 |
As the ladies pack up for the Hayworth, a drunk Sam returns to the motel to try and mend things with Justine while Debbie bails out to move back in with Mark. Ruth puts herself in charge of the event. With hardly any attendance in the ballroom, Tammé, Melrose, and Sheila pay several moviegoers from the Hollywood Palladium across the street to watch their show. Glen informs Cherry that she got the lead role in the station's upcoming cop drama series, but she has to quit GLOW in the process. The opening match goes out of control when the crowd does not take kindly to Arthie's "Beirut the Mad Bomber" gimmick and Rhonda is hit in the head with a beer can thrown by an audience member. Carmen overcomes her stagefright when her father starts cheering for her. The main event is a tag team match with Ruth and Jenny defeating Dawn and Stacey, only for Ruth to double-cross Jenny and pin her to win the GLOW Crown. Her coronation is suddenly interrupted when Debbie challenges her to a match. Debbie finishes off Ruth with a flying cross body to become the GLOW Champion. Tammé, however, steals the Crown as part of Sam's plan to continue the storyline.

=== Season 2 (2018) ===
| No. overall | No. in season | Title | Directed by | Written by | Original release date |
|---|---|---|---|---|---|
| 11 | 1 | "Viking Funeral" | Lynn Shelton | Liz Flahive & Carly Mensch | June 29, 2018 |
As the ladies prepare for their next episode, they discover that a new member named Yolanda has replaced Cherry in the role of Junkchain. They are also given new contracts by Sam and Bash. While Sam oversees the set construction at the gym, Ruth borrows new cameraman Russell and has the ladies shoot scenes at the mall for the show's title sequence. Meanwhile, Debbie tells Ruth that she will divorce Mark. Later that night, Debbie and Mark invite Glen over dinner and renegotiate the terms of her contract. The next morning, an infuriated Sam confronts Ruth over the title sequence and fires Reggie when she defends Ruth's decision to direct the sequence and the pilot episode. Debbie then reveals to Sam that she is now a producer of the show.
| 12 | 2 | "Candy of the Year" | Mark A. Burley | Nick Jones | June 29, 2018 |
The taping of the episode proves to be disastrous, with matches going too long in front of a bored audience. To solve this issue, Sam has the ladies audition matches for him to select the best three for the next episode. Ruth is assigned to work with Yolanda, who still does not have any in-ring experience, but they quickly bond when Yolanda teaches her breakdancing. Debbie arranges to have a producers' meeting with Sam and Bash at her home, but when they do not show up, Tammé comes in uninvited and keeps her company. Meanwhile, at Billy's band's concert, Justine gets in a fight with a crowd member and is kicked out of the venue. Sam slowly forms his father-daughter relationship with her by having her go to school. The next morning, Debbie, Sam, and Bash oversee the auditions. Dawn and Stacy steal Arthie's character change idea to evolve their Beatdown Biddies persona into "The Toxic Twins". Ruth and Yolanda's dance-off makes the cut, despite Sam's continued animosity towards Ruth.
| 13 | 3 | "Concerned Women of America" | Kate Dennis | Sascha Rothchild | June 29, 2018 |
When K-DTV receives complaints from the Concerned Women of America over GLOW's content, Bash and Debbie propose to produce a wholesome PSA spot to appease the group. Debbie and Ruth brainstorm on ideas for the PSA and come up with one about teen pregnancy. Meanwhile, Cherry struggles with her new starring role in Chambers and Gold, especially after the director decides to cut her lines and have her change her hair. Keith urges Sam to help Cherry in her situation. Sam realizes that Cherry's background in stunt work never prepared her for acting, and he talks Glen into bringing her back to GLOW. The ladies host a party at the motel to have sex with the male crew. Russell asks Ruth out on a date, but Debbie forces her to work overtime to finish the PSA, making her miss her date with Russell.
| 14 | 4 | "Mother of All Matches" | Mark A. Burley & John Cameron Mitchell | Kim Rosenstock | June 29, 2018 |
After receiving a phone call from Mark's new secretary over the brand of her bed, Debbie decides to sell off the bed and all the furniture in the house to spite her ex-husband. Tammé visits her son Ernest at Stanford University for parents' weekend, but when he becomes concerned about her new career, he insists on traveling with her back to L.A. for the next taping. In the main event, Debbie defeats Tammé to regain the GLOW Championship. The crowd suddenly turns on Debbie after Tammé is humiliated during the post-match segment and walks out of the ring. To get the crowd to support Debbie again, Ruth grabs a girl from the audience, announcing her as Liberty Belle's daughter Savannah Rose and issues a rematch to win her back. After the taping, Tammé explains to an upset Ernest her decision to join GLOW while Mark confronts Debbie at her now empty house.
| 15 | 5 | "Perverts Are People, Too" | Claire Scanlon | Rachel Shukert | June 29, 2018 |
The show experiences a setback when Patio Town pulls its sponsorship due to the chair incident during the main event and disagreements with the PSA, as well as low viewership ratings. While reading their fan mail, the ladies decide to set up a meet-and-greet table after the show. Sam, Debbie, and Bash explore story ideas to follow up the kidnapping angle, but leave Ruth out of the meeting. After a falling out with Florian over a bounced check, Bash, Carmen, and Rhonda look for Florian at a gay bar. Ruth meets with K-DTV president Tom Grant to discuss her future in the show, only to be sexually harassed by him before walking out on him. Bash goes to Birdie's home, where her butler Gary tells him that Florian stopped by a few days ago to borrow money for travel expenses. Gary then offers to help Bash with his bookkeeping. The next day, the producers discover that the show has been rescheduled to a 2:00 a.m. time slot. Ruth explains to Debbie that this is likely Grant's way of getting back at her, but Debbie berates her, telling her she should have had sex with him to save the show.
| 16 | 6 | "Work the Leg" | Lynn Shelton | Marquita J. Robinson | June 29, 2018 |
After learning that their original time slot has been given to a men's wrestling show, Sam and Bash tell the ladies to work harder. Tensions rise during training as the ladies vent their frustrations over their personal issues with each other until Carmen straightens them out. Later that night, Ruth and Sam attend a horror film festival that is playing one of his films, and they shortly resolve their issues before she tells him about her encounter with Grant. The next morning, Sam goes to K-DTV and breaks the windshield of Grant's car. After encountering Mark's new lover, a frustrated Debbie is offered by Sam to use his office to change her clothes; there, she discovers his stash of cocaine. During the show, Debbie suddenly becomes aggressive and breaks Ruth's ankle.
| 17 | 7 | "Nothing Shattered" | Sian Heder | Liz Flahive & Carly Mensch & Sascha Rothchild | June 29, 2018 |
Ruth is rushed to the hospital while tensions rise between Sam and Russell after the latter drops his camera to help her out of the ring. After the ladies go home, Debbie pays Ruth a visit and they learn that Ruth has a fracture that will keep her out of commission for at least eight weeks, leading to a heated argument between the both of them. Sam confesses to Ruth that he cannot do the show without her, and Debbie returns to apologize to her. Before Ruth is discharged from the hospital, Sam agrees to her request to rehire Reggie, seeing that the show will be cancelled anyway.
| 18 | 8 | "The Good Twin" | Meera Menon | Nick Jones & Rachel Shukert | June 29, 2018 |
A pastiche of a GLOW on-air broadcast, complete with sketches, vignettes, wrestling matches, and music videos. Zoya's identical twin sister Olga (also played by Ruth) travels with her goat to America to help Liberty Belle rescue Savannah Rose from Zoya. Cherry returns to the ring as the voodoo practitioner "Black Magic", who dupes Britannica into sacrificing her brain to bring her love mannequin Thomas to life. The ladies get together to record a song about child kidnapping. Liberty Belle storms through the evil fortress and is challenged by Vicky the Viking. She overcomes the triple-team of Vicky, Fortune Cookie, and Beirut to finally rescue her daughter. Meanwhile, Justine's mother Rosalie watches the broadcast only to discover that her daughter is involved with the show.
| 19 | 9 | "Rosalie" | Phil Abraham | Liz Flahive & Carly Mensch & Kim Rosenstock | June 29, 2018 |
As the show reaches its finale, the ladies prepare to move out of the motel while Jenny hands out application forms for possible job openings. This results in a dilemma for Rhonda, as she has been working without a social security number all this time. Rosalie storms into Sam's home in an attempt to take Justine back home. Sam and Ruth convince Rosalie to allow Justine to go to a school dance with Billy. At the dance, Sam talks Justine out of moving with Billy to New York, and Justine decides to move back with her mother. Ruth limps out of the dance when Sam attempts to kiss her. Meanwhile, Debbie and Bash attend a cable TV convention and plot an elaborate scheme to attract other producers' attention to GLOW. Their plan works, as they receive calls from interested network producers. When Rhonda reveals that she has been marked as an illegal alien, Carmen proposes to save her from deportation by having her marry Cupcake, her biggest fan, in the show's final episode. Ruth goes to Russell's apartment to start a relationship with him. Bash is notified that Florian has passed away from AIDS.
| 20 | 10 | "Every Potato Has a Receipt" | Jesse Peretz | Liz Flahive & Carly Mensch | June 29, 2018 |
Justine says goodbye to Sam before going back to Sacramento with Rosalie. Sam makes Ruth the show's co-director while Bash struggles to come to terms with Florian's death. Later, Sam discovers that Arthie has developed a romance with Yolanda. Before Rhonda and Cupcake exchange their vows, Bash suddenly objects to the marriage and proposes to her. Rhonda agrees to marry Bash, and Cupcake is immediately ejected from the ring. Bash then makes a battle royal out of the bouquet throwing ceremony for the GLOW Crown. Debbie, Carmen, and Sheila are the last ones standing when Big Kurt Jackson and Chico Guapo interrupt the match. The three ladies teach the men a lesson by throwing them out of the ring before resuming the fight for the bouquet. Ruth zip-lines from the ceiling to eliminate the trio and win the battle royal. After the show, Glen reveals that GLOW is property of K-DTV, preventing other networks from picking them up. However, Ray, the owner of a strip club chain, offers to have GLOW do its shows at the Riviera in Las Vegas. Ruth and Debbie say goodbye to their loved ones before they board the bus with the other ladies.

=== Season 3 (2019) ===
| No. overall | No. in season | Title | Directed by | Written by | Original release date |
|---|---|---|---|---|---|
| 21 | 1 | "Up, Up, Up" | Claire Scanlon | Liz Flahive & Carly Mensch | August 9, 2019 |
Shortly after the GLOW cast and crew move to Las Vegas, Debbie and Ruth are conducting an interview to promote their live show when the Space Shuttle Challenger suddenly explodes after liftoff, making Ruth feel guilty about insulting the crew as her Zoya persona. Despite Debbie, Sam, and Bash's consideration to reschedule GLOW's opening night, Sandy Devereaux St. Clair, the hotel's entertainment director, insists that the show must go on. Rehearsals do not go as planned due to the tragedy, as well as the hotel fire alarm going off. The Ladies regain their confidence backstage after a moment of silence and a brief balloon fight. Shortly after opening night, Ruth and Sam have a drink and reflect on the day's events before they join the rest of the Ladies to their inaugural party.
| 22 | 2 | "Hot Tub Club" | Mark A. Burley | Sascha Rothchild | August 9, 2019 |
On GLOW's day off, Debbie flies back to L.A. while Sam gets Ruth addicted to gambling. Rhonda is bedridden with a migraine, which puts Bash in an unfamiliar situation due to his upbringing. Meanwhile, after a night of sex, Arthie and Yolanda's relationship suddenly goes sour because Arthie refuses to let Yolanda go down on her as she feels not "sexy" enough for Yolanda. Upon her return to Vegas, Debbie is told by Mark that Randy started walking after she left. Ruth and Sam argue in a hot tub before Tammé joins them and interrupts the moment.
| 23 | 3 | "Desert Pollen" | Jesse Peretz | Rachel Shukert | August 9, 2019 |
Cherry becomes upset over the Ladies skipping their daily workout and has them take a rigorous dance class with Denise, the dance instructor for the hotel's showgirls. Feeling uneasy about her size compared to the showgirls, Debbie tries to do her own training. Meanwhile, Bash and Sam have a tennis doubles match with some local entertainers while Sheila and Tammé take up acting class. After quitting the class, Sheila discovers that Tammé has a back problem. Melrose has sex with a man named Paul, only to discover that he is a gigolo. After learning why Denise retired from the showgirl business, Cherry develops doubts about planning a family with Keith. Following a late dinner with Ruth, Debbie watches a videotape of Randy from Mark before forcing herself to vomit off her dinner.
| 24 | 4 | "Say Yes" | Claire Scanlon | Isaac Oliver | August 9, 2019 |
Russell pays Ruth a visit and they take a tour of Vegas' pawnshops, where she buys him a camera. Debbie, Sam, and Bash discuss plans for a new referee, as Keith has left Vegas following an argument with Cherry. A waiter and magician named Steve Mills offers his services to them, which comes into conflict with Cherry's Black Magic persona. Sam has Sheila read a draft of his new screenplay, but he kicks her out of his room for overanalyzing one of the characters. As the Ladies watch a drag show, Ruth and Russell get into a heated argument over her obsession with Sam, but they reconcile before he drives back to L.A. Debbie and Cherry share a joint and talk about married life. Drag performer Bobby Barnes sets up a private show for Bash in hopes of joining GLOW, but Bash turns him down before Sheila bonds with him backstage.
| 25 | 5 | "Freaky Tuesday" | Mark A. Burley | Marquita J. Robinson | August 9, 2019 |
Following the death of Rhapsody director/choreographer Bernie Rubenstein on GLOW's final week at the Fan-Tan, Sandy offers Bash and Debbie a contract extension until the end of the year. Debbie confronts Sandy over the offer, as it means more time away from her son. Justine pays Sam a visit and gives him her screenplay. Because of Tammé's back problems, the Ladies decide to switch roles for one night in front of Sandy, much to Bash and Sam's chagrin. Sheila borrows one of Bobby's costumes and takes the persona of a drunk Liza Minnelli in the ring. Backstage, Tammé's back worsens while Sam offers Justine's screenplay to Ruth to critique. After the show, Bash announces that GLOW will stay at the Fan-Tan until the end of the year - nine more months - and threatens to fire anyone who protests his decision.
| 26 | 6 | "Outward Bound" | Anya Adams | Liz Flahive & Carly Mensch | August 9, 2019 |
The Ladies go on a hiking trip at Red Rock Canyon. Debbie reveals to Ruth that she will return to L.A. and collect her paychecks instead of continuing the show with Bash. Melrose realizes that she offended Jenny with her racist portrayal of Fortune Cookie during the Freaky Tuesday show. Cherry informs Tammé that she is benched for the rest of the year due to her back problems, but Carmen proposes to have Tammé become a manager. As Sheila reaches the top of a hill, she sees a white wolf before passing out from dehydration. Ruth and Debbie get lost throughout the day, with Ruth confessing that she has feelings for Sam before they return to camp with Reggie and Sheila. Later that night, Melrose offers to host a Passover Seder, which breaks down when she tells everyone how her family had to live through The Holocaust and Jenny talks about losing her relatives to the Khmer Rouge Killing Fields before they comfort each other. Sheila throws her wig and outfit in the campfire to reveal her true self. Upon their return to the hotel the next morning, Ruth discovers that Sam checked out.
| 27 | 7 | "Hollywood Homecoming" | Alison Brie | Victor Quinaz | August 9, 2019 |
Back in L.A., Sam drives Justine to TriStar Pictures to present her screenplay, but the meeting ends in disaster after a confrontation with one of Sam's former friends. They successfully get a deal at another studio, but shortly thereafter, Sam has a heart attack. He goes to the hospital without telling Justine. Debbie takes advantage of Bash's sore throat and voices her opinion on him before losing Randy in the casino, leading to a date with a middle-aged tycoon named J. J. "Tex" McCready. Meanwhile, Birdie pays Bash and Rhonda a visit for lunch before she takes Rhonda out for a shopping trip. Rhonda confesses to Birdie that she married Bash for a green card, but she tells her that she manages his expenses. At the end of the day, Bash discovers that his marriage to Rhonda has unlocked his $40 million inheritance from his late grandfather. The next morning, Sam checks out of the hospital and goes home. Justine tells Sam she wants him to co-direct her film and they finally celebrate their successful deal.
| 28 | 8 | "Keep Ridin'" | Lynn Shelton | Liz Flahive & Carly Mensch & Sasha Rothschild | August 9, 2019 |
As GLOW reaches its 200th show, Ruth is told by Russell that he has been offered to work on Menahem Golan's film in Spain. Alongside GLOW, Bash has taken over Rhapsody as its producer, but he and Rhonda are concerned about the showgirl show's declining ticket sales. Cherry gets kicked out of the craps table for a $5,000 casino debt and has one week to pay it off, leading her to try out mud wrestling with Carmen. Sheila prepares for her first stage acting gig with Ruth for Bobby's upcoming AIDS charity ball. For her sixth month anniversary with Tex, Debbie tries her hand at horseback riding. Ruth receives a voice message from Sam, who asks her to come to Los Angeles to audition for a role in his and Justine's movie.
| 29 | 9 | "The Libertines" | Phil Abraham | Rachel Shukert | August 9, 2019 |
Debbie offers to produce Bobby's Libertine Ball AIDS fundraiser and give it the much-needed publicity. Ruth returns to L.A. to reunite with Sam and Justine and audition for their movie. Ruth confesses her feelings for Sam and they kiss passionately, but then he tells her Justine has decided to cast someone else for the role, leaving her devastated. Meanwhile, Rhonda asks Melrose for permission to borrow Paul as a means to make Bash jealous and get him to notice her again, but her plan ends up becoming a threesome, with Bash revealing himself to be attracted to men. At the Ball, Sheila becomes concerned when Ruth does not show up in time for their performance, but Bobby convinces her to have the stage to herself, earning her a standing ovation. Sandy ends the show by donning up a showgirl outfit, but the Ball is ruined by a fire instigated by a homophobic gang.
| 30 | 10 | "A Very GLOW Christmas" | Lynn Shelton | Liz Flahive & Carly Mensch | August 9, 2019 |
Days after the Libertine Ball Fire, Carmen tries to keep the Ladies in good spirits by having them do a Secret Santa and convincing them to do A Christmas Carol in the ring. Debbie's relationship with Tex goes sour when she realizes he is using her as a tool for his business dinners. During the show, Debbie sees a drunk Bash moping over his sexuality, fearing it will ruin his marriage and his life, but she sobers him up enough for his role. As the Ladies perform "White Christmas", Keith returns as Santa Claus and reunites with Cherry before he talks to her about adopting a child. After the show, Debbie has Bash secretly outbid Tex on the Orange County TV station KXN. The next morning, Bash reconciles with Rhonda and pulls his production money out of Rhapsody. Back in L.A., Sam legally becomes Justine's father to ensure that she inherits everything he owns. The Ladies part ways at the airport for the holidays, but before Ruth boards her plane, Debbie tells her that she and Bash will be reviving GLOW on TV and she wants Ruth to be the director. Ruth, however, declines the offer and boards her flight.
