= 25th Screen Actors Guild Awards =

- Awarded for: Outstanding motion picture and primetime television performances
- Date: January 27, 2019
- Location: Shrine Auditorium, Los Angeles, California
- Country: United States
- Presented by: SAG-AFTRA
- Hosted by: Megan Mullally
- Website: www.sagawards.org

Television/radio coverage
- Network: TNT and TBS simultaneous broadcast

The 25th Annual Screen Actors Guild Awards, honoring the best achievements in film and television performances for the year 2018, were presented on January 27, 2019 at the Shrine Auditorium in Los Angeles, California. The ceremony was broadcast live on both TNT and TBS 8:00 p.m. EST / 5:00 p.m. PST. The nominees were announced December 12, 2018 alongside the announcement of Megan Mullally as the ceremony's host.

Alan Alda was announced as the 2018 SAG Life Achievement Award recipient on October 4, 2018.

== Winners and nominees ==
Note: Winners are listed first and highlighted in boldface.

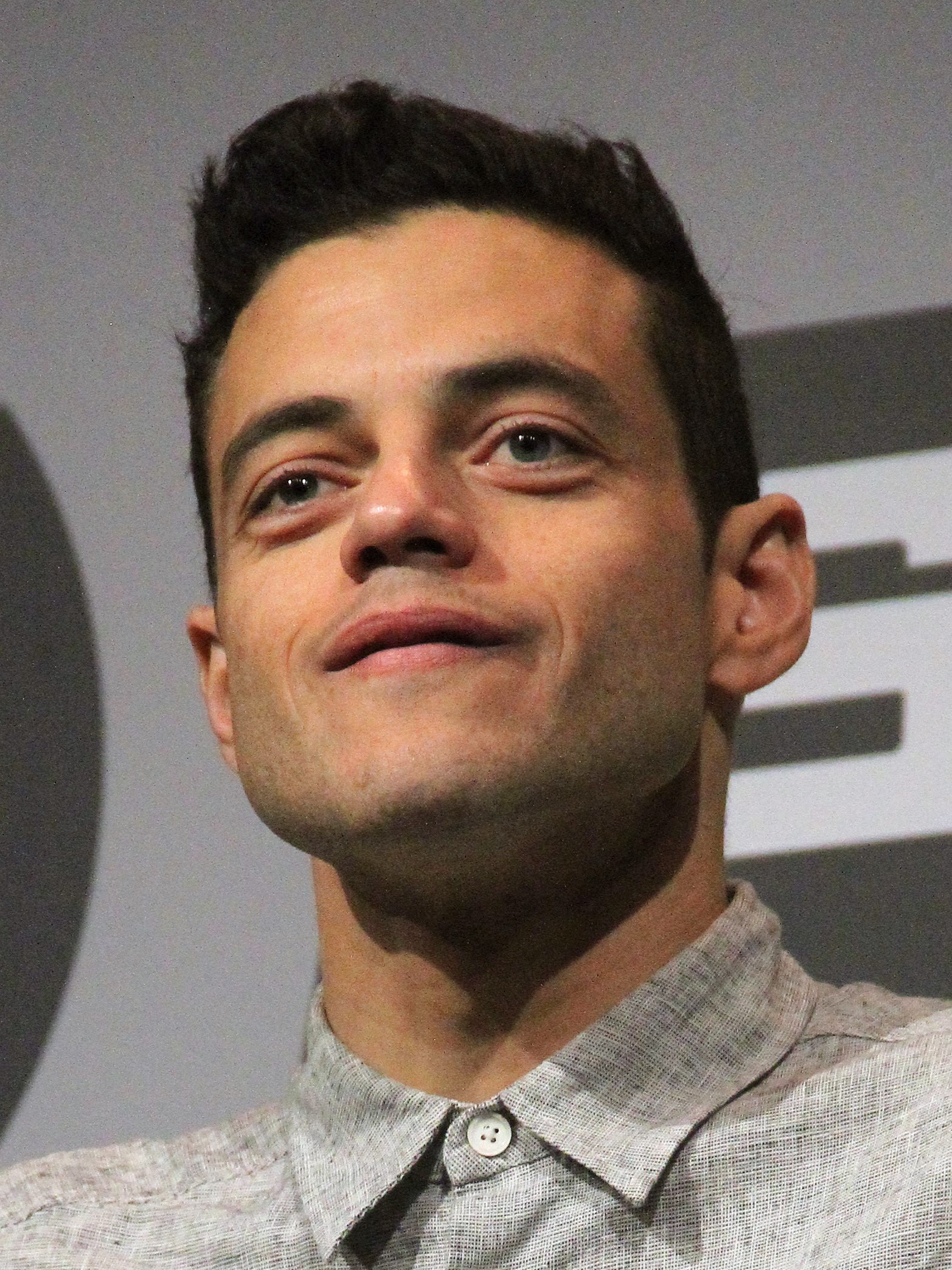
Rami Malek, Outstanding Performance by a Male Actor in a Leading Role winner

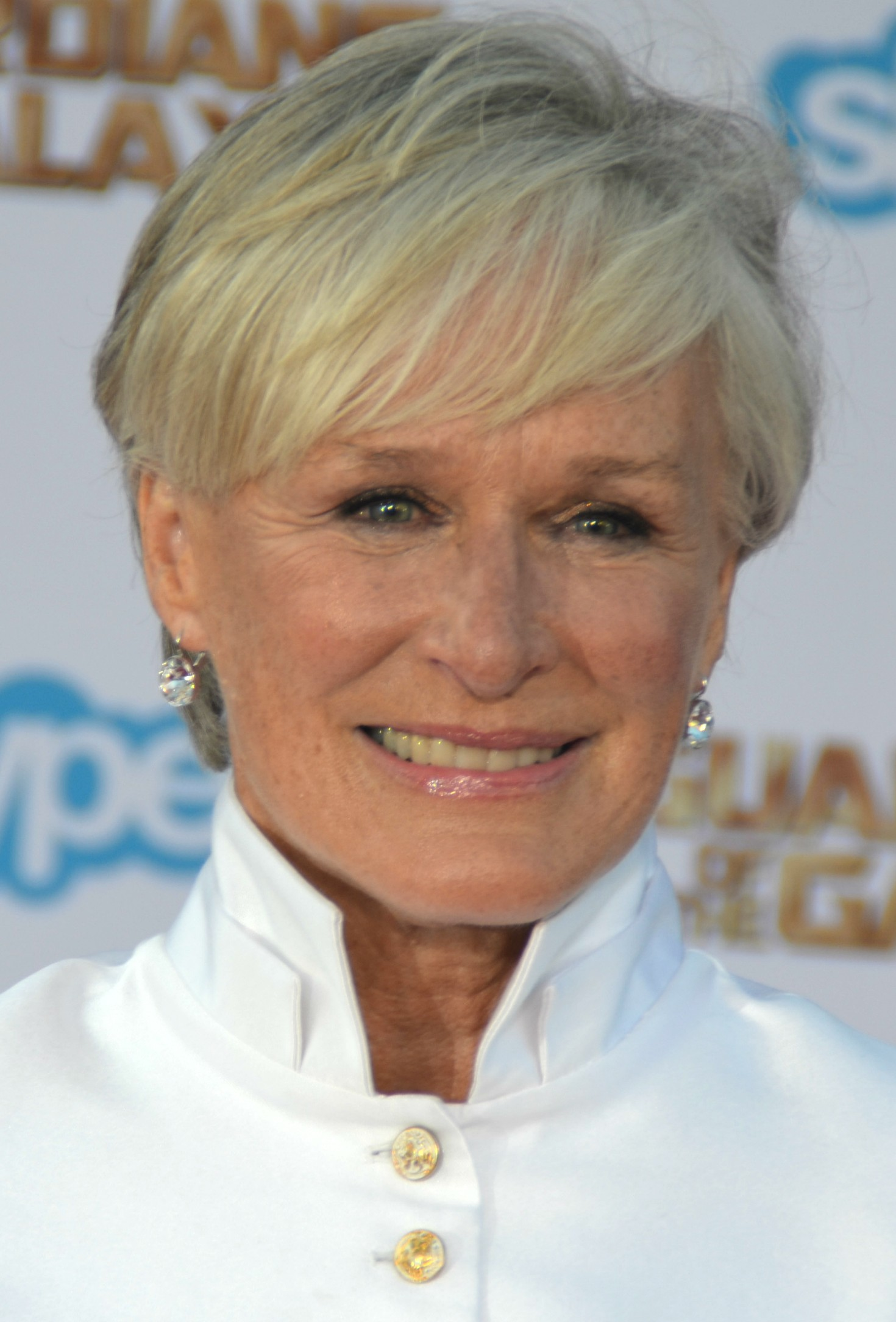
Glenn Close, Outstanding Performance by a Female Actor in a Leading Role winner

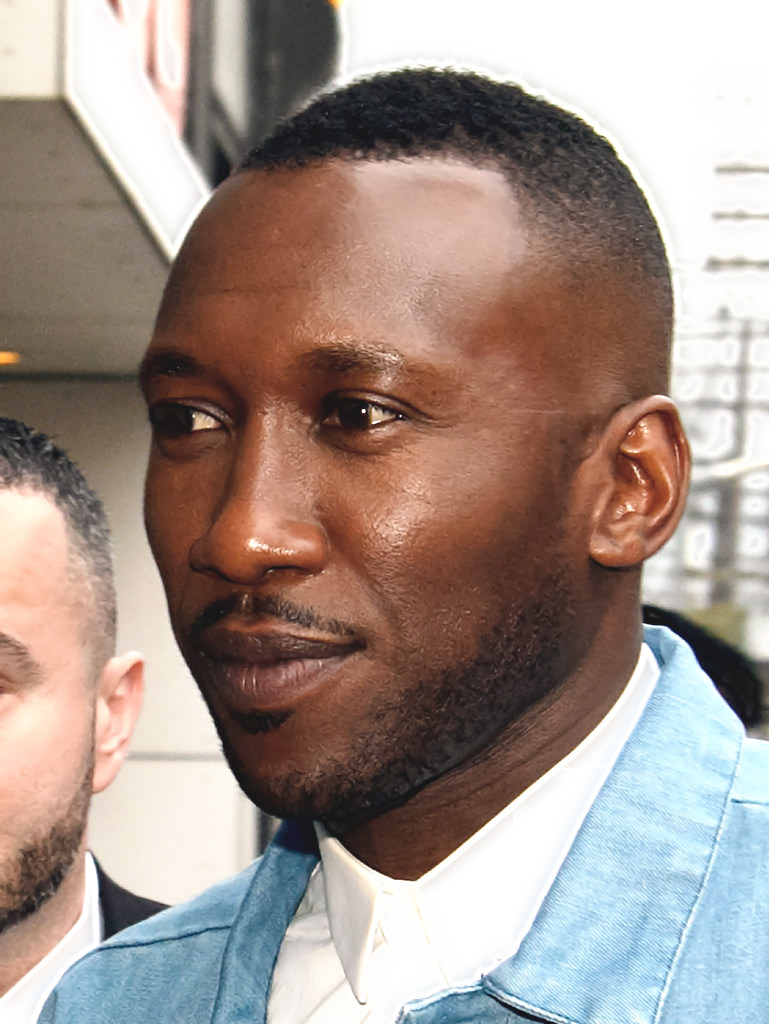
Mahershala Ali, Outstanding Performance by a Male Actor in a Supporting Role winner

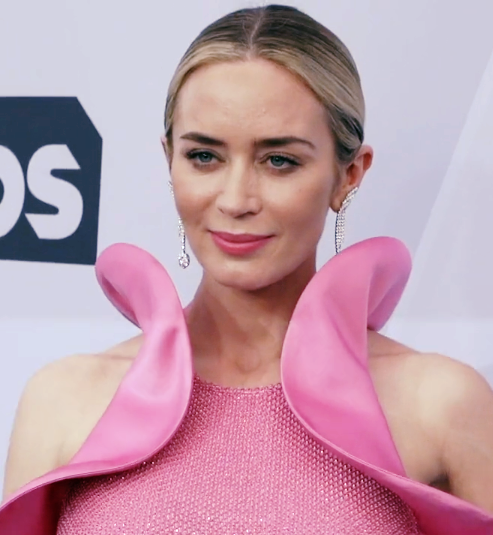
Emily Blunt, Outstanding Performance by a Female Actor in a Supporting Role winner

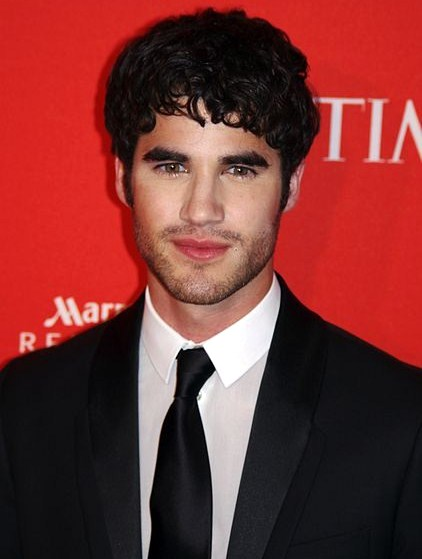
Darren Criss, Outstanding Performance by a Male Actor in a Miniseries or Television Movie winner

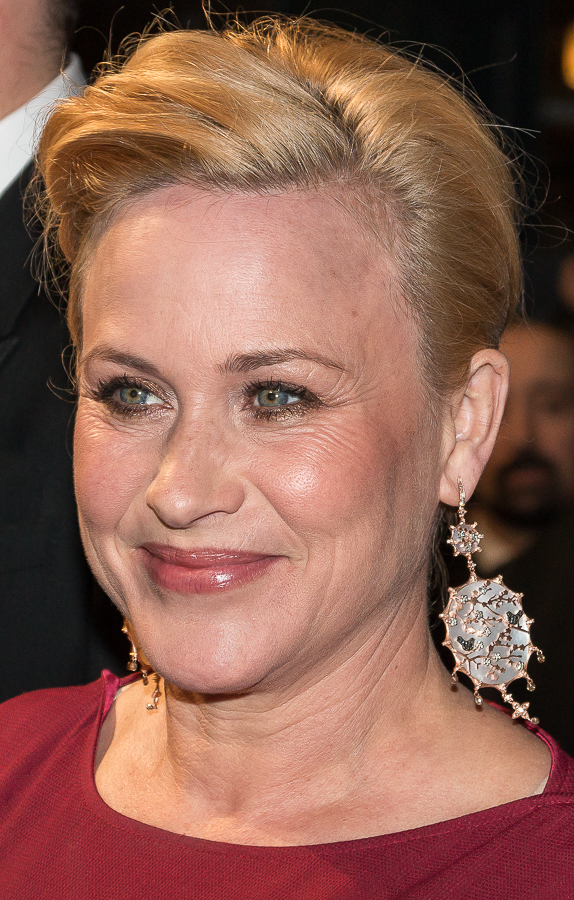
Patricia Arquette, Outstanding Performance by a Female Actor in a Miniseries or Television Movie winner

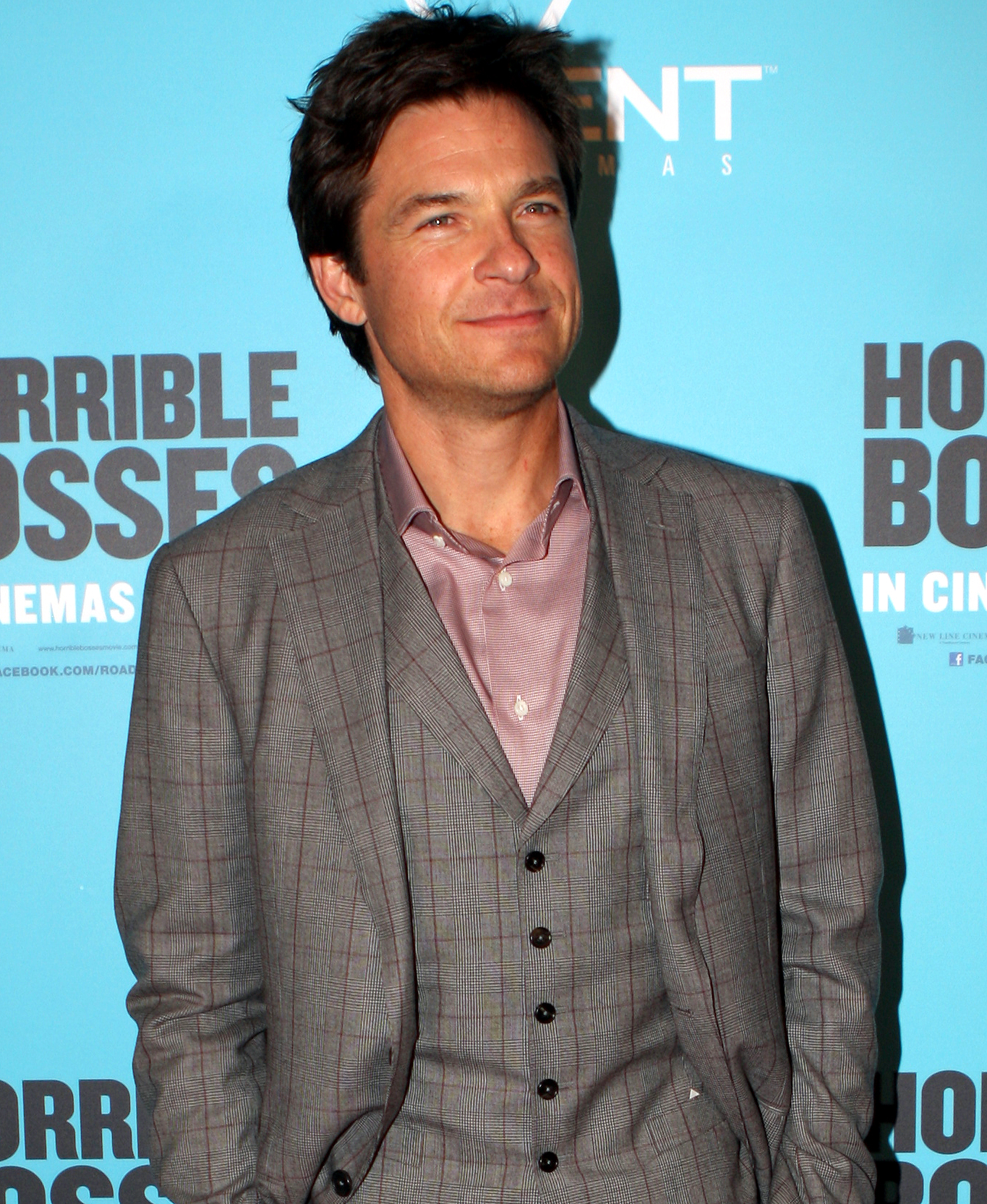
Jason Bateman, Outstanding Performance by a Male Actor in a Drama Series winner

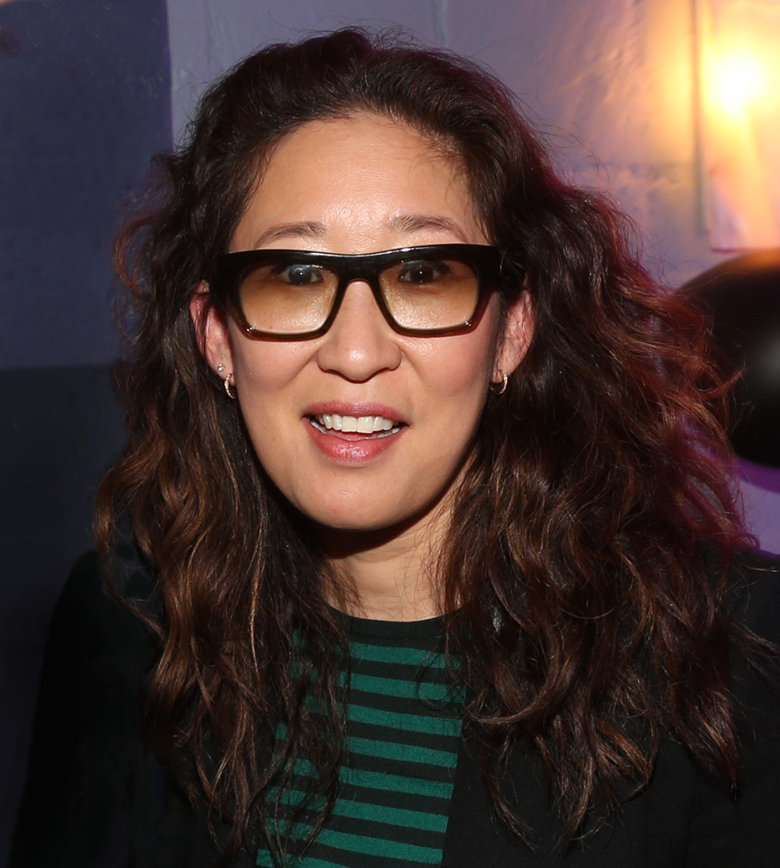
Sandra Oh, Outstanding Performance by a Female Actor in a Drama Series winner

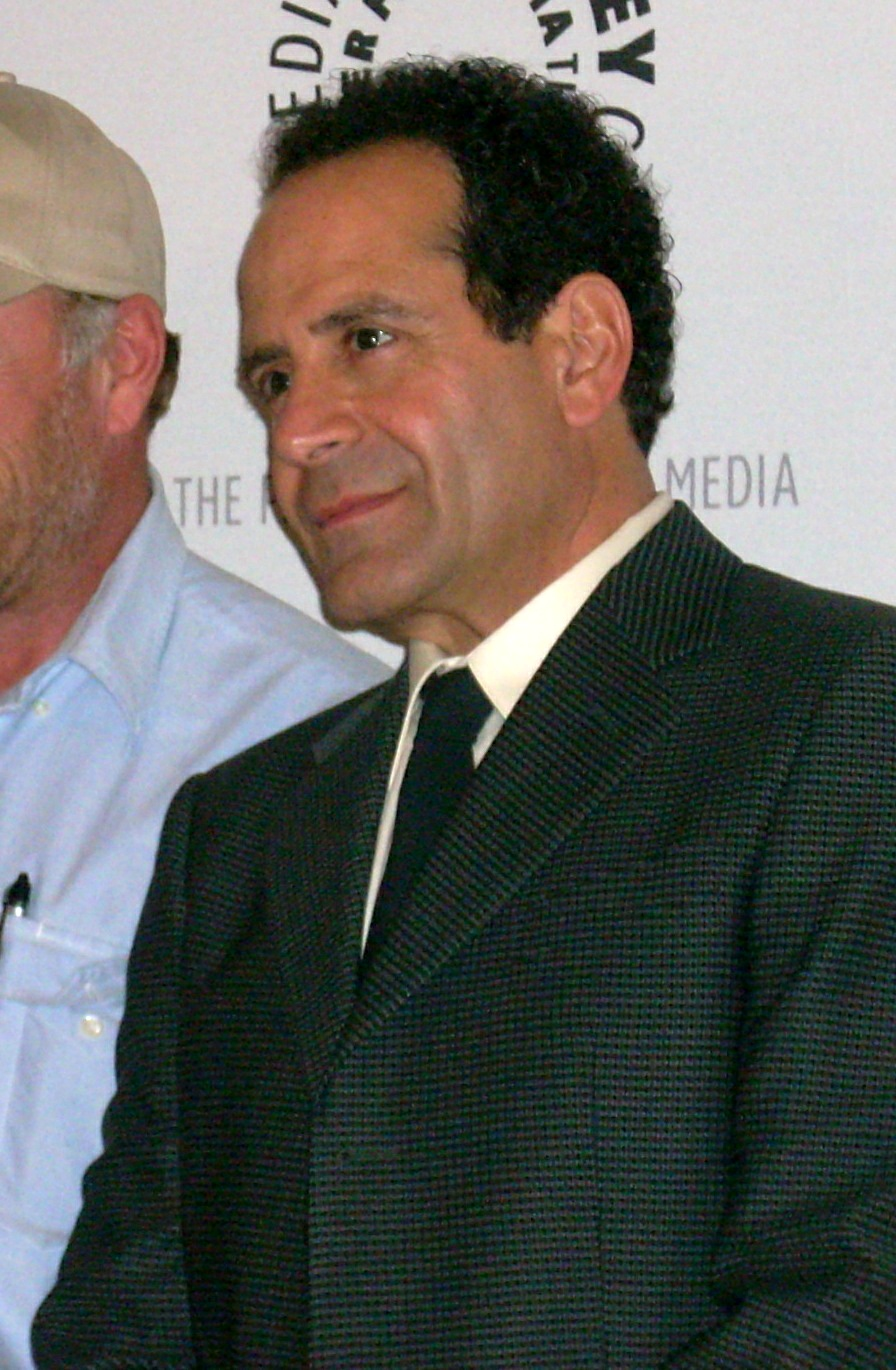
Tony Shalhoub, Outstanding Performance by a Male Actor in a Comedy Series winner

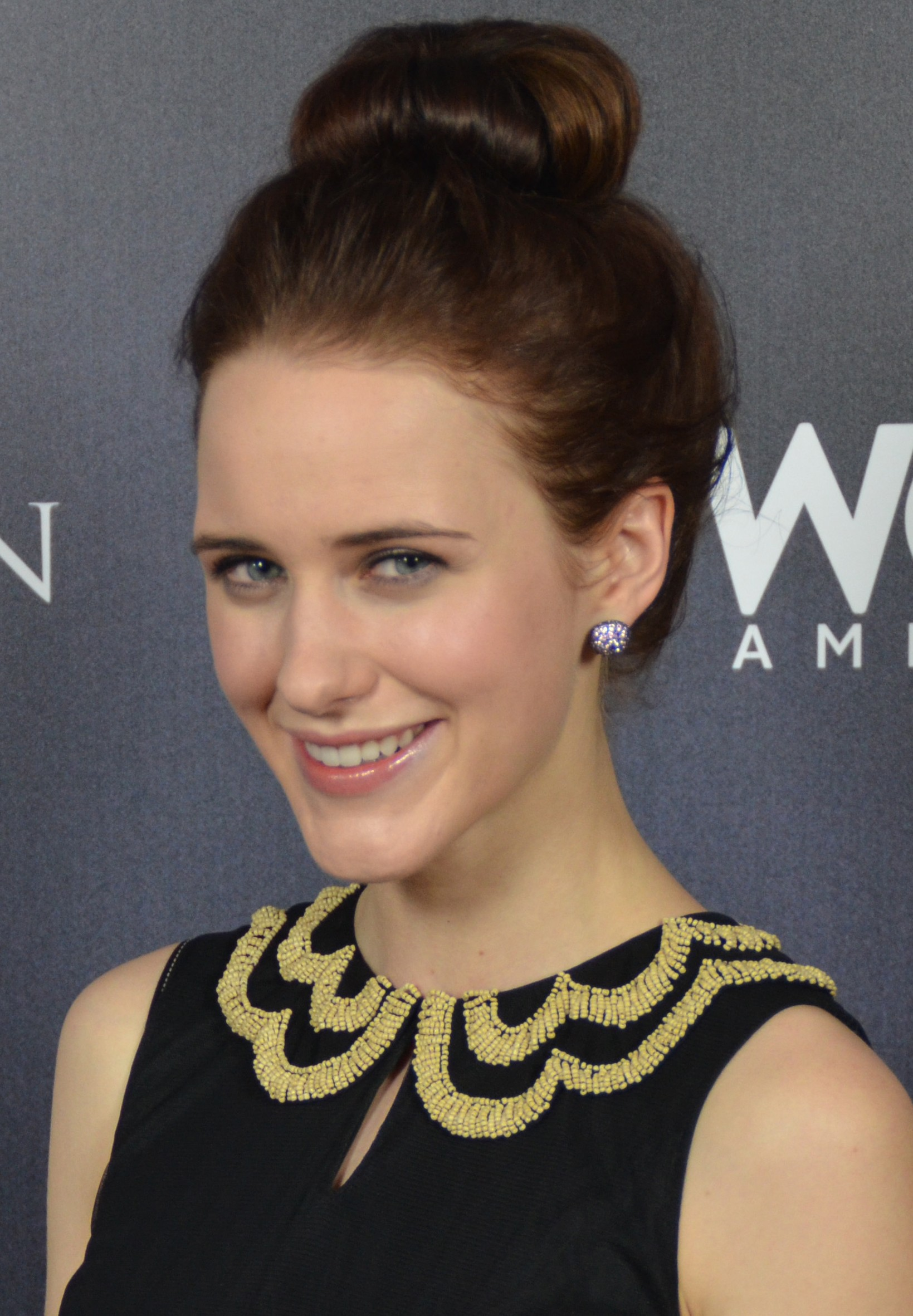
Rachel Brosnahan, Outstanding Performance by a Female Actor in a Comedy Series winner

=== Film ===
Outstanding Performance by a Male Actor in a Leading Role	Outstanding Performance by a Female Actor in a Leading Role
**Rami Malek – Bohemian Rhapsody as Freddie Mercury**; Christian Bale – Vice as Dick Cheney; Bradley Cooper – A Star Is Born as Jackson Maine; Viggo Mortensen – Green Book as Frank "Tony Lip" Vallelonga; John David Washington – BlacKkKlansman as Ron Stallworth	**Glenn Close – The Wife as Joan Castleman**; Emily Blunt – Mary Poppins Returns as Mary Poppins; Olivia Colman – The Favourite as Queen Anne; Lady Gaga – A Star Is Born as Ally Maine; Melissa McCarthy – Can You Ever Forgive Me? as Lee Israel
Outstanding Performance by a Male Actor in a Supporting Role	Outstanding Performance by a Female Actor in a Supporting Role
**Mahershala Ali – Green Book as Don Shirley**; Timothée Chalamet – Beautiful Boy as Nic Sheff; Adam Driver – BlacKkKlansman as Flip Zimmerman; Sam Elliott – A Star Is Born as Bobby Maine; Richard E. Grant – Can You Ever Forgive Me? as Jack Hock	**Emily Blunt – A Quiet Place as Evelyn Abbott**; Amy Adams – Vice as Lynne Cheney; Margot Robbie – Mary Queen of Scots as Queen Elizabeth I; Emma Stone – The Favourite as Abigail Hill; Rachel Weisz – The Favourite as Sarah Churchill
Outstanding Performance by a Cast in a Motion Picture
**Black Panther – Angela Bassett, Chadwick Boseman, Sterling K. Brown, Winston Duke, Martin Freeman, Danai Gurira, Michael B. Jordan, Daniel Kaluuya, Lupita Nyong'o, Andy Serkis, Forest Whitaker, and Letitia Wright**; BlacKkKlansman – Harry Belafonte, Adam Driver, Topher Grace, Laura Harrier, Corey Hawkins, and John David Washington; Bohemian Rhapsody – Lucy Boynton, Aidan Gillen, Ben Hardy, Tom Hollander, Gwilym Lee, Allen Leech, Rami Malek, Joe Mazzello, and Mike Myers; Crazy Rich Asians – Awkwafina, Gemma Chan, Henry Golding, Ken Jeong, Lisa Lu, Harry Shum Jr., Constance Wu, and Michelle Yeoh; A Star Is Born – Dave Chappelle, Andrew Dice Clay, Bradley Cooper, Sam Elliott, Rafi Gavron, Lady Gaga, and Anthony Ramos
Outstanding Performance by a Stunt Ensemble in a Motion Picture
**Black Panther**; Ant-Man and the Wasp; Avengers: Infinity War; The Ballad of Buster Scruggs; Mission: Impossible – Fallout

=== Television ===
Outstanding Performance by a Male Actor in a Miniseries or Television Movie	Outstanding Performance by a Female Actor in a Miniseries or Television Movie
**Darren Criss – The Assassination of Gianni Versace: American Crime Story (FX) as Andrew Cunanan**; Antonio Banderas – Genius: Picasso (National Geographic) as Pablo Picasso; Hugh Grant – A Very English Scandal (Amazon Prime Video) as Jeremy Thorpe; Anthony Hopkins – King Lear (Prime Video) as Lear; Bill Pullman – The Sinner (USA Network) as Harry Ambrose	**Patricia Arquette – Escape at Dannemora (Showtime) as Tilly Mitchell**; Amy Adams – Sharp Objects (HBO) as Camille Preaker; Patricia Clarkson – Sharp Objects (HBO) as Adora Crellin; Penélope Cruz – The Assassination of Gianni Versace: American Crime Story (FX) as Donatella Versace; Emma Stone – Maniac (Netflix) as Annie Landsberg
Outstanding Performance by a Male Actor in a Drama Series	Outstanding Performance by a Female Actor in a Drama Series
**Jason Bateman – Ozark (Netflix) as Marty Byrde**; Sterling K. Brown – This Is Us (NBC) as Randall Pearson; Joseph Fiennes – The Handmaid's Tale (Hulu) as Commander Fred Waterford; John Krasinski – Jack Ryan (Prime Video) as Jack Ryan; Bob Odenkirk – Better Call Saul (AMC) as Jimmy McGill	**Sandra Oh – Killing Eve (BBC America) as Eve Polastri**; Julia Garner – Ozark (Netflix) as Ruth Langmore; Laura Linney – Ozark (Netflix) as Wendy Byrde; Elisabeth Moss – The Handmaid's Tale (Hulu) as June Osborne / Offred; Robin Wright – House of Cards (Netflix) as Claire Underwood
Outstanding Performance by a Male Actor in a Comedy Series	Outstanding Performance by a Female Actor in a Comedy Series
**Tony Shalhoub – The Marvelous Mrs. Maisel (Prime Video) as Abe Weissman**; Alan Arkin – The Kominsky Method (Netflix) as Norman Newlander; Michael Douglas – The Kominsky Method (Netflix) as Sandy Kominsky; Bill Hader – Barry (HBO) as Barry Berkman / Barry Block; Henry Winkler – Barry (HBO) as Gene Cousineau	**Rachel Brosnahan – The Marvelous Mrs. Maisel (Prime Video) as Miriam "Midge" Maisel**; Alex Borstein – The Marvelous Mrs. Maisel (Prime Video) as Susie Myerson; Alison Brie – GLOW (Netflix) as Ruth Wilder; Jane Fonda – Grace and Frankie (Netflix) as Grace Hanson; Lily Tomlin – Grace and Frankie (Netflix) as Frankie Bergstein
Outstanding Performance by an Ensemble in a Drama Series
**This Is Us (NBC) – Eris Baker, Sterling K. Brown, Niles Fitch, Mackenzie Hancsicsak, Justin Hartley, Faithe Herman, Jon Huertas, Melanie Liburd, Chrissy Metz, Mandy Moore, Lyric Ross, Chris Sullivan, Milo Ventimiglia, Susan Kelechi Watson, and Hannah Zeile**; The Americans (FX) – Anthony Arkin, Scott Cohen, Brandon J. Dirden, Noah Emmerich, Laurie Holden, Margo Martindale, Matthew Rhys, Costa Ronin, Keri Russell, Keidrich Sellati, Miriam Shor, and Holly Taylor; Better Call Saul (AMC) – Jonathan Banks, Rainer Bock, Ray Campbell, Giancarlo Esposito, Michael Mando, Bob Odenkirk, and Rhea Seehorn; The Handmaid's Tale (Hulu) – Alexis Bledel, Madeline Brewer, Amanda Brugel, Ann Dowd, O. T. Fagbenle, Joseph Fiennes, Nina Kiri, Max Minghella, Elisabeth Moss, Yvonne Strahovski, Sydney Sweeney, and Bahia Watson; Ozark (Netflix) – Jason Bateman, Lisa Emery, Skylar Gaertner, Julia Garner, Darren Goldstein, Jason Butler Harner, Carson Holmes, Sofia Hublitz, Laura Linney, Trevor Long, Janet McTeer, Peter Mullan, Jordana Spiro, Charlie Tahan, Robert Treveiler, and Harris Yulin
Outstanding Performance by an Ensemble in a Comedy Series
**The Marvelous Mrs. Maisel (Prime Video) – Caroline Aaron, Alex Borstein, Rachel Brosnahan, Marin Hinkle, Zachary Levi, Kevin Pollak, Tony Shalhoub, Brian Tarantina, and Michael Zegen**; Atlanta (FX) – Khris Davis, Donald Glover, Brian Tyree Henry, and Lakeith Stanfield; Barry (HBO) – Darrell Britt-Gibson, D'Arcy Carden, Andy Carey, Anthony Carrigan, Rightor Doyle, Glenn Fleshler, Alejandro Furth, Sarah Goldberg, Bill Hader, Kirby Howell-Baptiste, Paula Newsome, John Pirruccello, Stephen Root, and Henry Winkler; GLOW (Netflix) – Britt Baron, Shakira Barrera, Alison Brie, Kimmy Gatewood, Betty Gilpin, Rebekka Johnson, Chris Lowell, Sunita Mani, Marc Maron, Kate Nash, Wyatt Nash, Sydelle Noel, Victor Quinaz, Gayle Rankin, Bashir Salahuddin, Kia Stevens, Jackie Tohn, Ellen Wong, and Britney Young; The Kominsky Method (Netflix) – Jenna Lyng Adams, Alan Arkin, Sarah Baker, Casey Thomas Brown, Michael Douglas, Ashleigh LaThrop, Emily Osment, Graham Rogers, Susan Sullivan, Melissa Tang, and Nancy Travis
Outstanding Performance by a Stunt Ensemble in a Television Series
**GLOW (Netflix)**; Daredevil (Netflix); Jack Ryan (Prime Video); The Walking Dead (AMC); Westworld (HBO)

=== Screen Actors Guild Life Achievement Award ===
- Alan Alda

== Multiple nominations ==
=== Film ===
Nominations	Film
4	A Star Is Born
3	BlacKkKlansman
3	The Favourite
2	Black Panther
2	Bohemian Rhapsody
2	Can You Ever Forgive Me?
2	Green Book
2	Vice

=== Television ===
Nominations	Program
4	The Marvelous Mrs. Maisel
4	Ozark
3	Barry
3	GLOW
3	The Handmaid's Tale
3	The Kominsky Method
2	The Assassination of Gianni Versace: American Crime Story
2	Better Call Saul
2	Grace and Frankie
2	Jack Ryan
2	Sharp Objects
2	This Is Us

== Multiple wins ==
=== Film ===
Wins	Film
2	Black Panther

=== Television ===
Wins	Program
3	The Marvelous Mrs. Maisel

== In Memoriam ==
The segment honored the following who died in 2018:

- James Karen
- Bradford Dillman
- Charlotte Rae
- Dorothy Malone
- John Mahoney
- Olivia Cole
- Susan Anspach
- R. Lee Ermey
- Reg E. Cathey
- Philip Bosco
- Bill Daily
- David Ogden Stiers
- Chuck McCann
- Donald Moffat
- Jerry Maren
- Ricky Jay
- Aretha Franklin
- Ken Berry
- Barbara Harris
- John Gavin
- Nanette Fabray
- Soon-Tek Oh
- Tab Hunter
- Scott Wilson
- Kitty O'Neil
- Verne Troyer
- Mickey Jones
- Bob Einstein
- Sondra Locke
- Harry Anderson
- Margot Kidder
- Carol Channing
- Burt Reynolds
- Penny Marshall

== Presenters ==
The following individuals presented awards at the ceremony:

- Alec Baldwin and Megan Mullally with Outstanding Performance by a Male Actor in a Comedy Series
- Matt Bomer and Ricky Martin with Outstanding Performance by a Female Actor in a Comedy Series
- Bradley Cooper, Lady Gaga, Sam Elliott, and Anthony Ramos introduced A Star Is Born
- Tracy Morgan with Outstanding Performance by an Ensemble in a Comedy Series
- Chris Pine with Outstanding Performance by a Female Actor in a Supporting Role
- Chadwick Boseman and Angela Bassett introduced Black Panther
- Robin Wright with Outstanding Performance by a Male Actor in a Supporting Role
- Keri Russell and Richard Madden with Outstanding Performance by a Male Actor in a Television Movie or Miniseries
- John David Washington and Adam Driver introduced BlacKkKlansman
- Glenn Close and Michael Douglas with Outstanding Performance by a Female Actor in a Television Movie or Miniseries
- Constance Wu, Michelle Yeoh, Henry Golding, and Ken Jeong introduced Crazy Rich Asians
- Tom Hanks presented the SAG Life Achievement Award
- Awkwafina and Laverne Cox with Outstanding Performance by a Male Actor in a Drama Series
- Rami Malek, Joe Mazzello, Gwilym Lee, and Ben Hardy introduced Bohemian Rhapsody
- Antonio Banderas with Outstanding Performance by a Female Actor in a Drama Series
- Scott Bakula presented In Memoriam segment
- Hugh Grant with Outstanding Performance by an Ensemble in a Drama Series
- Rachel Weisz with Outstanding Performance by a Male Actor in a Leading Role
- Gary Oldman with Outstanding Performance by a Female Actor in a Leading Role
- Jodie Foster with Outstanding Performance by a Cast in a Motion Picture

== See also ==
- 23rd Satellite Awards
- 24th Critics' Choice Awards
- 34th Independent Spirit Awards
- 39th Golden Raspberry Awards
- 45th Saturn Awards
- 46th Annie Awards
- 72nd British Academy Film Awards
- 76th Golden Globe Awards
- 91st Academy Awards
