= Actor Awards =

Accolades given by SAG-AFTRA

- Current: 32nd Actor Awards
- Awarded for: Achievements in film and primetime television performances
- Country: United States
- Presented by: Screen Actors Guild (1995–2012); SAG-AFTRA (2013–present)
- Formerly called: Screen Actors Guild (SAG) Awards
- First award: 1995; 31 years ago
- Website: actorawards.org

Television coverage
- Networks
- NBC (1995–1997); TNT (1998–2022); TBS (2007–2022); YouTube (Netflix) (2023); Netflix (2024–present)

The Actor Awards presented by SAG-AFTRA, formerly known as the Screen Actors Guild (SAG) Awards until 2025, are accolades given by the Screen Actors Guild–American Federation of Television and Radio Artists (SAG-AFTRA). The awards were founded in 1995, to recognize outstanding performances in film and primetime television. The awards have been one of the major awards events in the Hollywood film industry since, along with the Golden Globe Awards and the Academy Awards. The awards focus on both individual performances and the work of the entire ensemble of a drama series and comedy series, and the cast of a motion picture.

Nominations for the awards come from two committees, one for film and one for television, each numbering 2,100 members of the union, randomly selected anew each year, with the full membership (165,000 in 2012) available to vote for the winners. It is considered an indicator of success at the Academy Awards in acting categories. The awards were telecast on NBC from 1995 to 1997 and on TNT from 1998 to 2022, with a simulcast on TBS from 2007 to 2022. In 2023, Netflix livestreamed the awards on its YouTube channel. Netflix began to air the awards live in 2024.

The inaugural Screen Actors Guild Awards aired live on February 25, 1995, from Universal Studios' Stage 12. The second annual awards aired live from the Santa Monica Civic Auditorium, while subsequent awards have been held at the Shrine Auditorium. In the 2018 ceremony, actress Kristen Bell became the first host in the award show's history. In November 2025, the SAG Awards was renamed the Actor Awards. As of 2026, Shakespeare in Love and One Battle After Another are the only films to have received nominations in all eligible categories, and Everything Everywhere All at Once is the only film to receive four awards, including the ensemble award.

The statuette given, a nude male figure holding both a mask of comedy and a mask of tragedy, is called "The Actor". It is 16 inches (41 cm) tall, weighs over 12 pounds (5.4 kg), is cast in solid bronze, and is produced by the American Fine Arts Foundry in Burbank, California.

== Ceremonies ==
"The Actor", the trophy for the award

#	Date	Host	Venue	Network
1st	February 25, 1995	—N/a	Universal Studios Hollywood	NBC
2nd	February 24, 1996	—N/a	Santa Monica Civic Auditorium	NBC
3rd	February 22, 1997	—N/a	Shrine Auditorium	NBC
4th	March 8, 1998	—N/a	Shrine Auditorium	TNT
5th	March 7, 1999	—N/a	Shrine Auditorium	TNT
6th	March 12, 2000	—N/a	Shrine Auditorium	TNT
7th	March 11, 2001	—N/a	Shrine Auditorium	TNT
8th	March 10, 2002	—N/a	Shrine Auditorium	TNT
9th	March 9, 2003	—N/a	Shrine Auditorium	TNT
10th	February 22, 2004	—N/a	Shrine Auditorium	TNT
11th	February 5, 2005	—N/a	Shrine Auditorium	TNT
12th	January 29, 2006	—N/a	Shrine Auditorium	TNT and TBS
13th	January 28, 2007	—N/a	Shrine Auditorium	TNT and TBS
14th	January 27, 2008	—N/a	Shrine Auditorium	TNT and TBS
15th	January 25, 2009	—N/a	Shrine Auditorium	TNT and TBS
16th	January 23, 2010	—N/a	Shrine Auditorium	TNT and TBS
17th	January 30, 2011	—N/a	Shrine Auditorium	TNT and TBS
18th	January 29, 2012	—N/a	Shrine Auditorium	TNT and TBS
19th	January 27, 2013	—N/a	Shrine Auditorium	TNT and TBS
20th	January 18, 2014	—N/a	Shrine Auditorium	TNT and TBS
21st	January 25, 2015	—N/a	Shrine Auditorium	TNT and TBS
22nd	January 30, 2016	—N/a	Shrine Auditorium	TNT and TBS
23rd	January 29, 2017	—N/a	Shrine Auditorium	TNT and TBS
24th	January 21, 2018	Kristen Bell	Shrine Auditorium	TNT and TBS
25th	January 27, 2019	Megan Mullally	Shrine Auditorium	TNT and TBS
26th	January 19, 2020	—N/a	Shrine Auditorium	TNT and TBS
27th	April 4, 2021	—N/a	—N/a	TNT and TBS
28th	February 27, 2022	—N/a	Barker Hangar	TNT and TBS
29th	February 26, 2023	—N/a	Fairmont Century Plaza	Netflix (via YouTube)
30th	February 24, 2024	Idris Elba	Shrine Auditorium	Netflix
31st	February 23, 2025	Kristen Bell	Shrine Auditorium	Netflix
32nd	March 1, 2026	Kristen Bell	Shrine Auditorium	Netflix
33rd	February 28, 2027	TBA	TBA	TBA
34th	February 20, 2028	TBA	TBA	TBA

== Categories ==
=== Film ===
- Outstanding Performance by a Cast in a Motion Picture
- Outstanding Performance by a Male Actor in a Leading Role in a Motion Picture
- Outstanding Performance by a Female Actor in a Leading Role in a Motion Picture
- Outstanding Performance by a Male Actor in a Supporting Role in a Motion Picture
- Outstanding Performance by a Female Actor in a Supporting Role in a Motion Picture
- Outstanding Action Performance by a Stunt Ensemble in a Motion Picture

=== Television ===
- Outstanding Performance by an Ensemble in a Drama Series
- Outstanding Performance by an Ensemble in a Comedy Series
- Outstanding Performance by a Male Actor in a Drama Series
- Outstanding Performance by a Female Actor in a Drama Series
- Outstanding Performance by a Male Actor in a Comedy Series
- Outstanding Performance by a Female Actor in a Comedy Series
- Outstanding Performance by a Male Actor in a Television Movie or Limited Series
- Outstanding Performance by a Female Actor in a Television Movie or Limited Series
- Outstanding Action Performance by a Stunt Ensemble in a Television Series

=== Life Achievement ===
- SAG-AFTRA Life Achievement Award

== Superlatives ==
=== Per film ===
Films with most wins
Wins	Film	Year (Note: Year of the ceremony.)	Categories					
Wins	Film	Year	Cast	Leading Male	Leading Female	Supporting Male	Supporting Female	Stunt Ensemble (since 2008)
4	Everything Everywhere All at Once	2023	Won		Won	Won	Won	
3	American Beauty	2000	Won	Won	Won			
3	Chicago	2003	Won		Won		Won	
3	The Help	2012	Won		Won		Won	
3	Three Billboards Outside Ebbing, Missouri	2018	Won		Won	Won		
3	Oppenheimer	2024	Won	Won		Won		

Films with most nominations
Nom.	Film	Year	Categories					
Nom.	Film	Year	Cast	Leading Male	Leading Female	Supporting Male	Supporting Female	Stunt Ensemble (since 2008)
7	One Battle After Another	2026	Nominated	Nominated	Nominated	Nominated (x2)	Nominated	Nominated
5	Shakespeare in Love	1999	Nominated	Nominated	Nominated	Nominated	Nominated	
5	Chicago	2003	Nominated	Nominated	Nominated		Nominated (×2)	
5	Doubt	2009	Nominated		Nominated	Nominated	Nominated (×2)	
5	The Banshees of Inisherin	2023	Nominated	Nominated		Nominated (×2)	Nominated	
5	Everything Everywhere All at Once	2023	Nominated		Nominated	Nominated	Nominated (×2)	
5	Wicked	2025	Nominated		Nominated	Nominated	Nominated	Nominated
5	Sinners	2026	Nominated	Nominated		Nominated	Nominated	Nominated

=== Per television show ===
==== Total ====
Television shows with most wins
Wins	Television show	Years	Type
12	30 Rock	2006–2013	Comedy
9	Game of Thrones	2011–2019	Drama
8	ER	1994–2009	Drama
8	The Sopranos	1999–2007	Drama
7	Will & Grace	1998–2020	Comedy
7	The Crown	2016–2023	Drama
6	Seinfeld	1989–1998	Comedy
6	The West Wing	1999–2006	Drama
5	Modern Family	2009–2020	Comedy
5	Orange Is the New Black	2013–2019	Comedy
5	The Marvelous Mrs. Maisel	2017–2023	Comedy

Television shows with most nominations
Nom.	Television show	Years	Type
26	The Sopranos	1999–2007	Drama
26	Frasier	1993–2004	Comedy
25	Modern Family	2009–2020	Comedy
23	NYPD Blue	1993–2005	Drama
22	Everybody Loves Raymond	1996–2005	Comedy
22	30 Rock	2006–2013	Comedy
21	Will & Grace	1998–2020	Comedy
21	Game of Thrones	2011–2019	Drama
20	The West Wing	1999–2006	Drama

==== In a single year ====
Television shows with most wins in a single year
Wins	Television show	Year	Type	Categories			
Wins	Television show	Year	Type	Ensemble	Male	Female	Stunt Ensemble (since 2008)
4	Shōgun	2025	Drama	Won	Won	Won	Won
3	ER	1998	Drama	Won	Won	Won	
3	The Sopranos	2000	Drama	Won	Won	Won	
3	The Sopranos	2008	Drama	Won	Won	Won	
3	The West Wing	2001	Drama	Won	Won	Won	
3	The West Wing	2002	Drama	Won	Won	Won	
3	30 Rock	2009	Comedy	Won	Won	Won	
3	The Marvelous Mrs. Maisel	2019	Comedy	Won	Won	Won	
3	Squid Game	2022	Drama		Won	Won	Won
3	The Bear	2024	Comedy	Won	Won	Won	
3	The Studio	2026	Comedy	Won	Won	Won	

Television shows with most nominations in a single year
Nom.	Television show	Year	Type	Categories			
Nom.	Television show	Year	Type	Ensemble	Male	Female	Stunt Ensemble (since 2008)
6	Angels in America	2004	Miniseries		Nominated (×3)	Nominated (×3)	
6	Everybody Loves Raymond	2004	Comedy	Nominated	Nominated (×3)	Nominated (×2)	
5	The Sopranos	2000	Drama	Nominated	Nominated	Nominated (×3)	
5	Modern Family	2012	Comedy	Nominated	Nominated (×2)	Nominated (×2)	
5	The Crown	2021	Drama	Nominated	Nominated	Nominated (×3)	
5	Schitt's Creek	2021	Comedy	Nominated	Nominated (×2)	Nominated (×2)	
5	Succession	2022	Drama	Nominated	Nominated (×3)	Nominated	
5	Succession	2024	Drama	Nominated	Nominated (×3)	Nominated	
5	Ted Lasso	2022	Comedy	Nominated	Nominated (×2)	Nominated (×2)	
5	Shōgun	2025	Drama	Nominated	Nominated (×2)	Nominated	Nominated
5	The Studio	2026	Comedy	Nominated	Nominated (×2)	Nominated (×2)	

=== Per actor ===
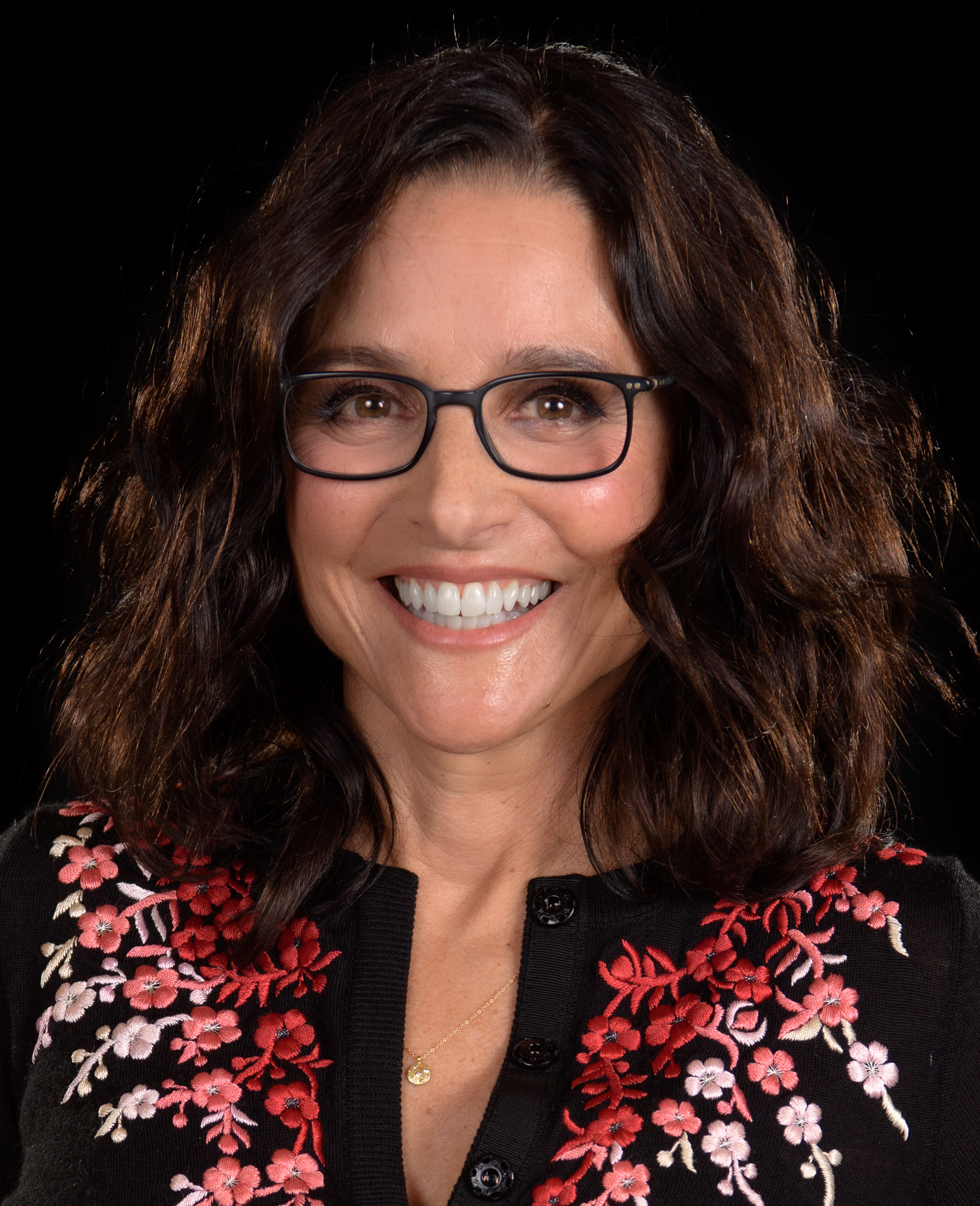
Julia Louis-Dreyfus, winner of the most awards (9)

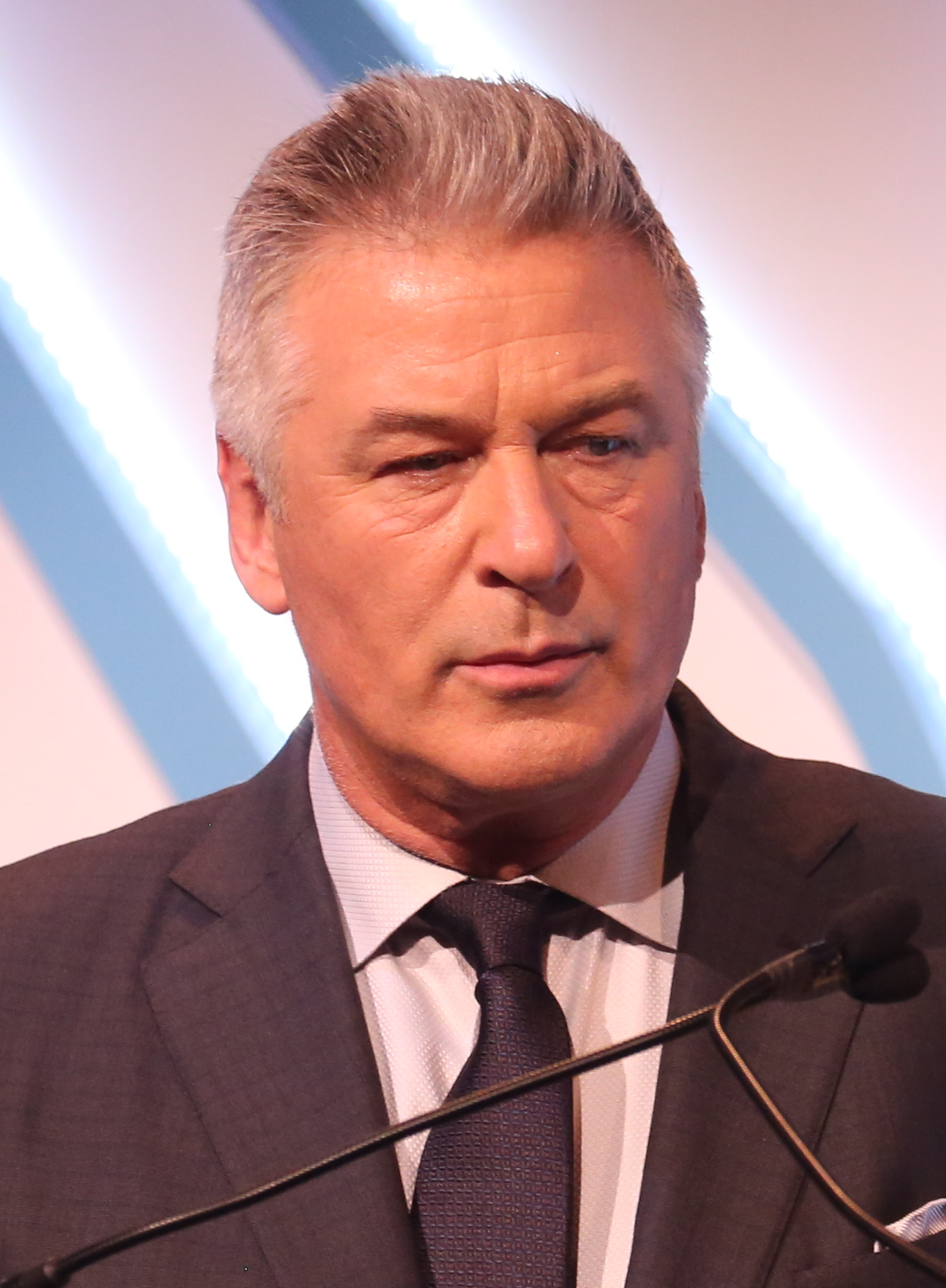
Alec Baldwin, winner of the most individual awards (7)

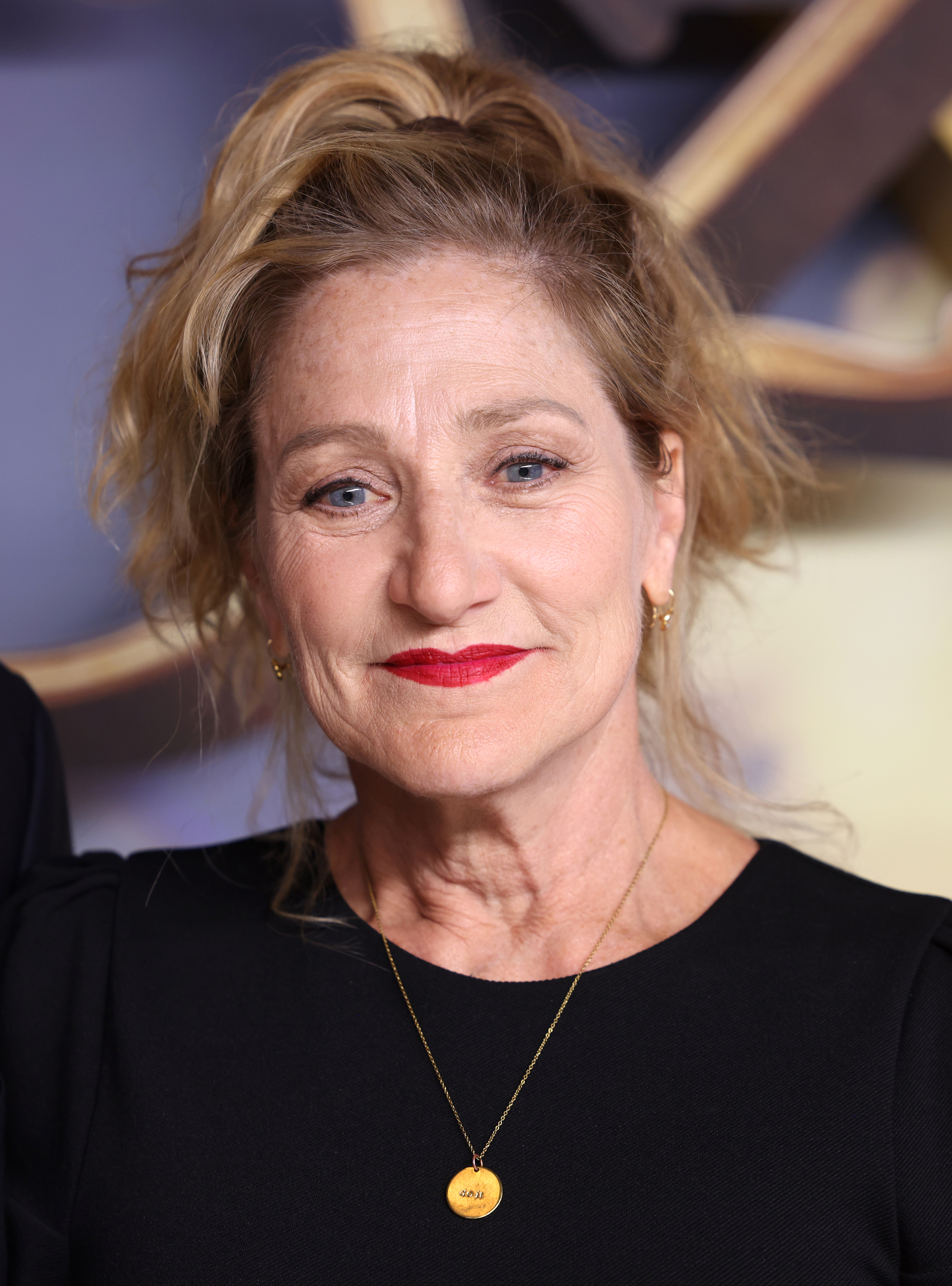
Edie Falco, the most nominated performer, both in total (22) and in individual categories only (14)

The non-competitive SAG-AFTRA Life Achievement Award is excluded in the superlatives.

==== Total (all categories) ====
Actors with most wins
Wins	Actor
9	Julia Louis-Dreyfus
8	Alec Baldwin
8	Julianna Margulies
7	Allison Janney
6	Viola Davis
6	Anthony Edwards
6	Tony Shalhoub
6	Noah Wyle

Actors with most nominations
Nom.	Actor
22	Edie Falco
21	Julia Louis-Dreyfus
21	Julianna Margulies
20	Alec Baldwin
20	Meryl Streep
19	Cate Blanchett
19	Steve Carell
19	David Hyde Pierce
18	Kelsey Grammer
18	Allison Janney
17	Elisabeth Moss
17	Peter Dinklage
16	James Gandolfini
15	Leonardo DiCaprio
15	Nicole Kidman

==== Total (individual categories only) ====
Actors with most individual wins
Wins	Actor
7	Alec Baldwin
5	Viola Davis
5	Julia Louis-Dreyfus
4	Tina Fey
4	William H. Macy
4	Julianna Margulies
4	Helen Mirren
4	Tony Shalhoub
4	Kate Winslet

Actors with most individual nominations
Nom.	Actor
14	Edie Falco
12	Cate Blanchett
12	Julia Louis-Dreyfus
12	Meryl Streep
11	Alec Baldwin
11	Helen Mirren
10	Steve Carell
10	Glenn Close
10	Judi Dench
10	Nicole Kidman
10	Tony Shalhoub
10	Kate Winslet
9	Julianna Margulies

==== In a single year ====
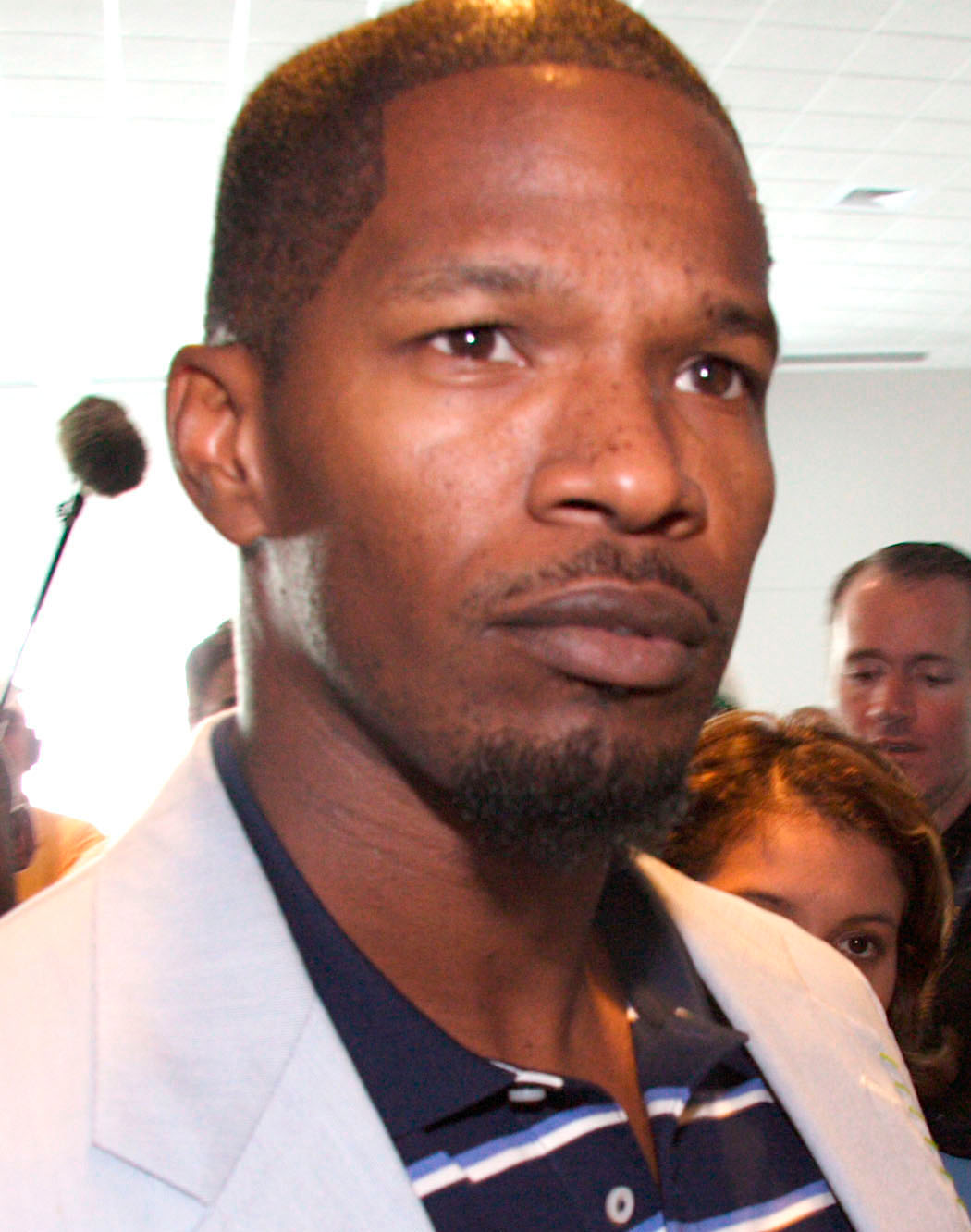
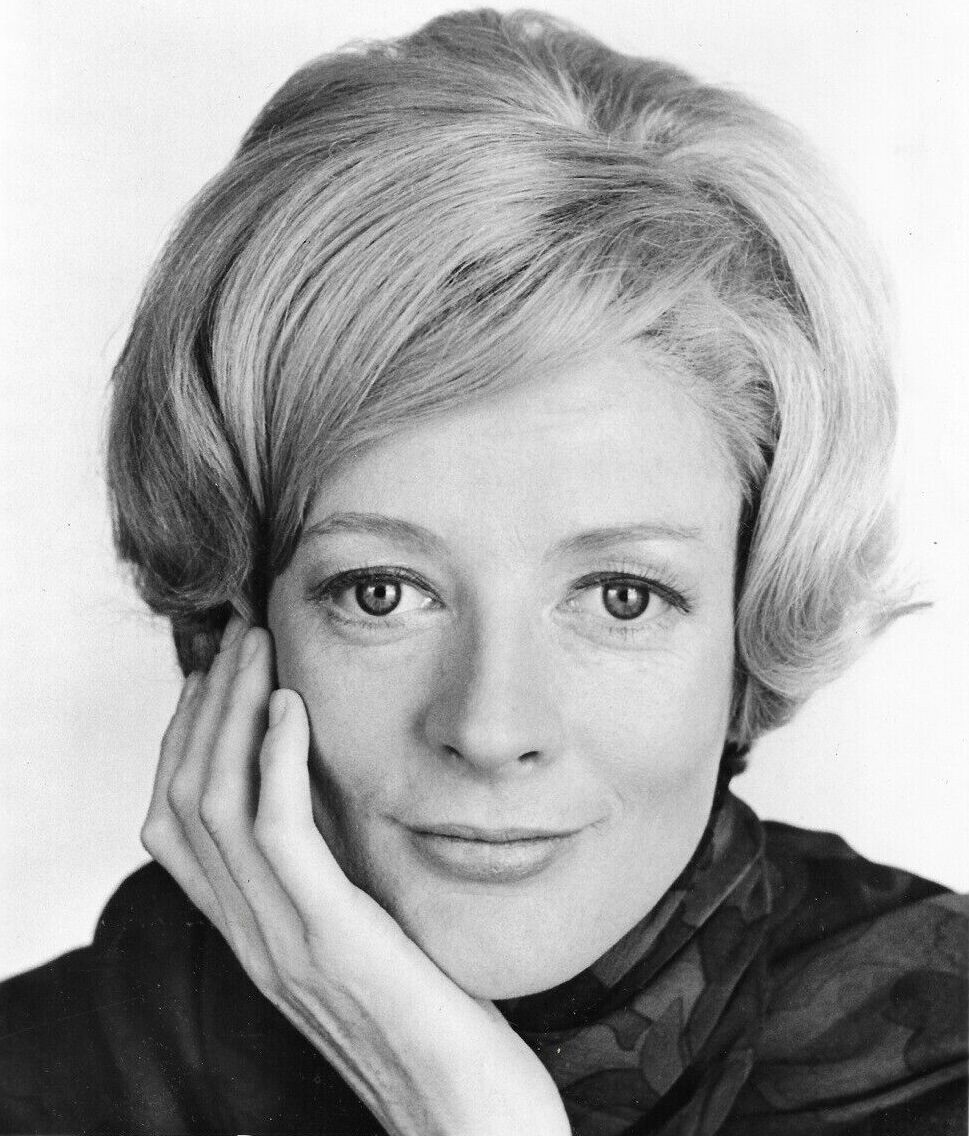
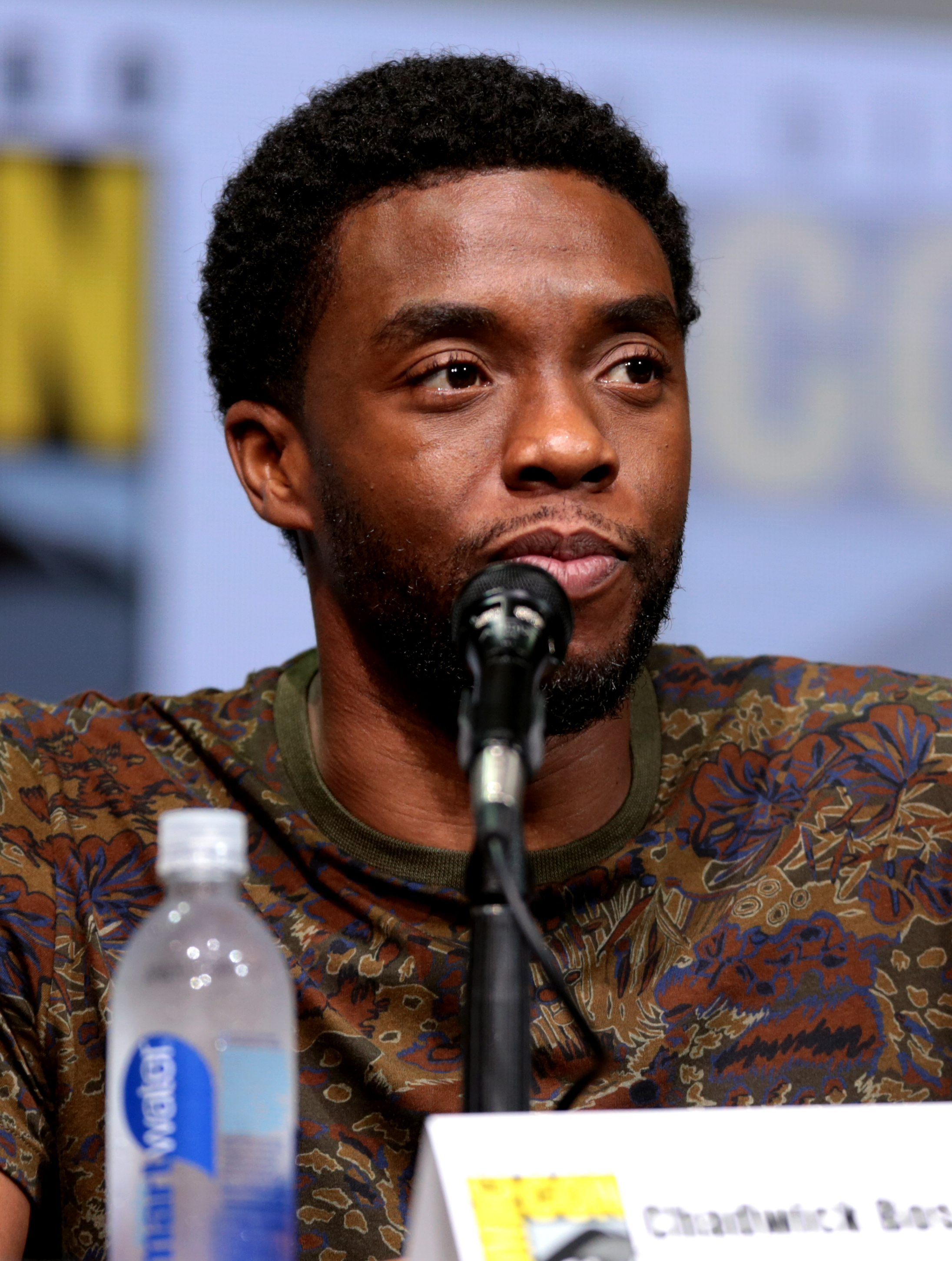
Jamie Foxx, Maggie Smith and Chadwick Boseman are the only actors with four nominations in a single year

Actors with most nominations in a single year
Nom.	Actor	Year	Categories and work
4	Jamie Foxx	2005	Male Actor in a Leading Role (Ray); Male Actor in a Supporting Role (Collateral); Cast in a Motion Picture (Ray); Male Actor in a Miniseries or Television Movie (Redemption: The Stan Tookie Williams Story)
4	Maggie Smith	2013	Female Actor in a Supporting Role (The Best Exotic Marigold Hotel); Cast in a Motion Picture (The Best Exotic Marigold Hotel); Female Actor in a Drama Series (Downton Abbey); Ensemble in a Drama Series (Downton Abbey)
4	Chadwick Boseman	2021	Male Actor in a Leading Role (Ma Rainey's Black Bottom); Male Actor in a Supporting Role (Da 5 Bloods); Cast in a Motion Picture (Ma Rainey's Black Bottom); Cast in a Motion Picture (Da 5 Bloods)

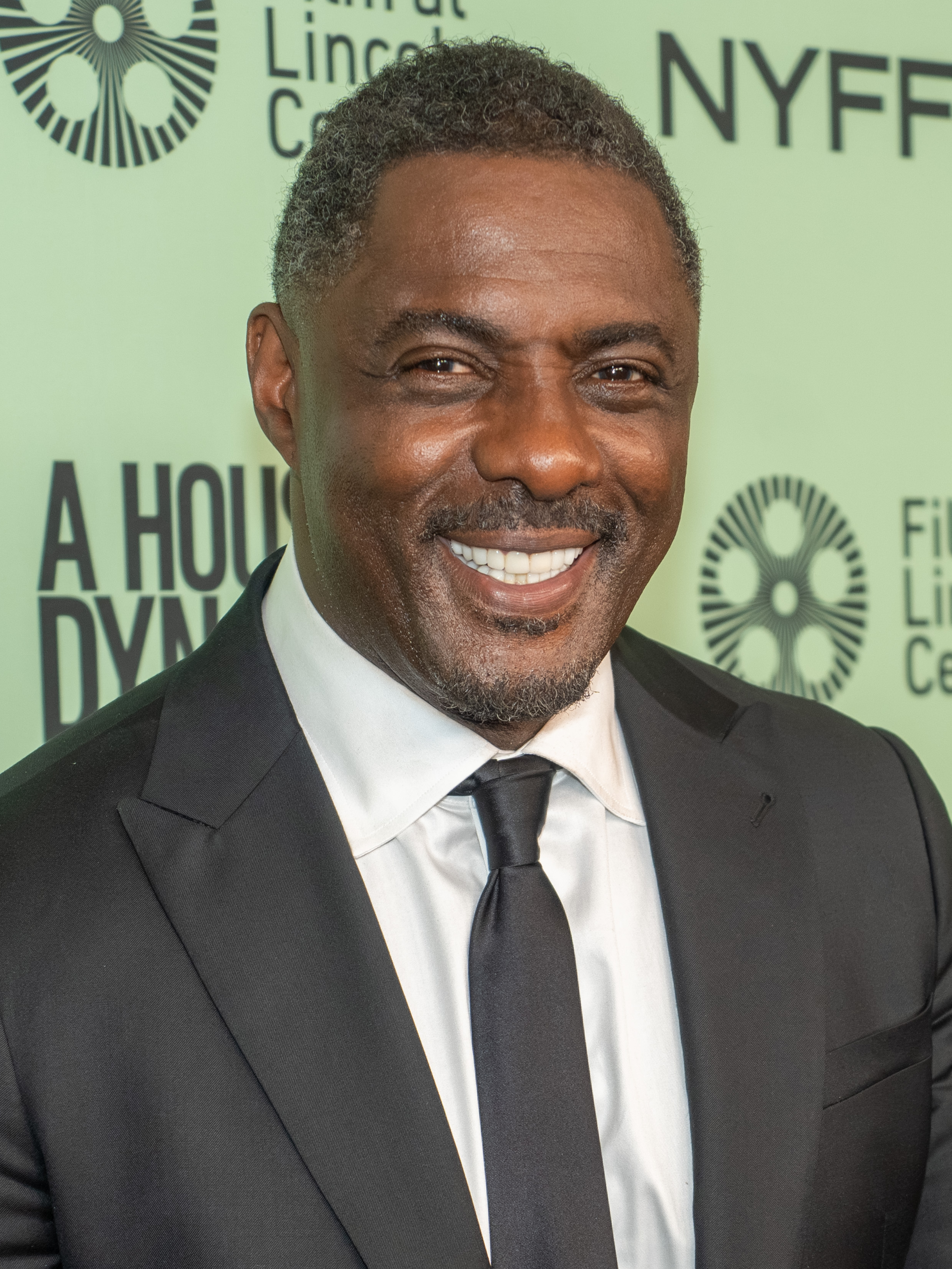
Helen Mirren and Idris Elba are the only actors with two individual awards in a single year

Actors with most individual awards in a single year
Wins	Actor	Year	Categories and work
2	Helen Mirren	2007	Female Actor in a Leading Role (The Queen); Female Actor in a Miniseries or Television Movie (Elizabeth I)
2	Idris Elba	2016	Male Actor in a Supporting Role (Beasts of No Nation); Male Actor in a Miniseries or Television Movie (Luther)
