= Actor Award for Outstanding Action Performance by a Stunt Ensemble in a Television Series =

Award by Screen Actors Guild

- Awarded for: Outstanding Performance by a Stunt Ensemble in a Television Series
- Location: Los Angeles, California
- Presented by: SAG-AFTRA
- Currently held by: The Last of Us (2025)
- Website: actorawards.org

The Actor Award for Outstanding Action Performance by a Stunt Ensemble in a Television Series is one of the awards given by the Screen Actors Guild.

The award recognizes the work of stunt performers and coordinators and was first presented at the 14th Screen Actors Guild Awards in 2008, alongside a corresponding Actor Award for stunt work in film.

== Winners and nominees ==
indicates the winner.

=== 2000s ===
Year	Television series	Network
2007 (14th)	24	Fox
2007 (14th)	Heroes	NBC
2007 (14th)	Lost	ABC
2007 (14th)	Rome	HBO
2007 (14th)	The Unit	CBS
2008 (15th)	Heroes	NBC
2008 (15th)	The Closer	TNT
2008 (15th)	Friday Night Lights	NBC
2008 (15th)	Prison Break	Fox
2008 (15th)	The Unit	CBS
2009 (16th)	24	Fox
2009 (16th)	Heroes	NBC
2009 (16th)	The Closer	TNT
2009 (16th)	Dexter	Showtime
2009 (16th)	The Unit	CBS

=== 2010s ===
Year	Television series	Network
2010 (17th)	True Blood	HBO
2010 (17th)	Burn Notice	USA
2010 (17th)	CSI: NY	CBS
2010 (17th)	Dexter	Showtime
2010 (17th)	Southland	TNT
2011 (18th)	Game of Thrones	HBO
2011 (18th)	Dexter	Showtime
2011 (18th)	Southland	TNT
2011 (18th)	Spartacus: Gods of the Arena	Starz
2011 (18th)	True Blood	HBO
2012 (19th)	Game of Thrones	HBO
2012 (19th)	Boardwalk Empire	HBO
2012 (19th)	Breaking Bad	AMC
2012 (19th)	Sons of Anarchy	FX
2012 (19th)	The Walking Dead	AMC
2013 (20th)	Game of Thrones	HBO
2013 (20th)	Boardwalk Empire	HBO
2013 (20th)	Breaking Bad	AMC
2013 (20th)	Homeland	Showtime
2013 (20th)	The Walking Dead	AMC
2014 (21st)	Game of Thrones	HBO
2014 (21st)	Boardwalk Empire	HBO
2014 (21st)	24: Live Another Day	Fox
2014 (21st)	Homeland	Showtime
2014 (21st)	Sons of Anarchy	FX
2014 (21st)	The Walking Dead	AMC
2015 (22nd)	Game of Thrones	HBO
2015 (22nd)	The Blacklist	NBC
2015 (22nd)	Homeland	Showtime
2015 (22nd)	Marvel's Daredevil	Netflix
2015 (22nd)	The Walking Dead	AMC
2016 (23rd)	Game of Thrones	HBO
2016 (23rd)	Marvel's Daredevil	Netflix
2016 (23rd)	Marvel's Luke Cage	Netflix
2016 (23rd)	The Walking Dead	AMC
2016 (23rd)	Westworld	HBO
2017 (24th)	Game of Thrones	HBO
2017 (24th)	Stranger Things	Netflix
2017 (24th)	GLOW	Netflix
2017 (24th)	Homeland	Showtime
2017 (24th)	The Walking Dead	AMC
2018 (25th)	GLOW	Netflix
2018 (25th)	Marvel's Daredevil	Netflix
2018 (25th)	Tom Clancy's Jack Ryan	Prime Video
2018 (25th)	The Walking Dead	AMC
2018 (25th)	Westworld	HBO
2019 (26th)	Game of Thrones	HBO
2019 (26th)	Stranger Things	Netflix
2019 (26th)	GLOW	Netflix
2019 (26th)	The Walking Dead	AMC
2019 (26th)	Watchmen	HBO

=== 2020s ===
Year	Television series	Network
2020 (27th)	The Mandalorian	Disney+
2020 (27th)	The Boys	Prime Video
2020 (27th)	Cobra Kai	Netflix
2020 (27th)	Lovecraft Country	HBO
2020 (27th)	Westworld	HBO
2021 (28th)	Squid Game	Netflix
2021 (28th)	Cobra Kai	Netflix
2021 (28th)	The Falcon and the Winter Soldier	Disney+
2021 (28th)	Loki	Disney+
2021 (28th)	Mare of Easttown	HBO
2022 (29th)	Stranger Things	Netflix
2022 (29th)	Andor	Disney+
2022 (29th)	The Boys	Prime Video
2022 (29th)	House of the Dragon	HBO
2022 (29th)	The Lord of the Rings: The Rings of Power	Prime Video
2023 (30th)	The Last of Us	HBO
2023 (30th)	Ahsoka	Disney+
2023 (30th)	Barry	HBO
2023 (30th)	Beef	Netflix
2023 (30th)	The Mandalorian	Disney+
2024 (31st)	Shōgun	FX
2024 (31st)	The Boys	Prime Video
2024 (31st)	Fallout	Prime Video
2024 (31st)	House of the Dragon	HBO
2024 (31st)	The Penguin	HBO
2025 (32nd)	The Last of Us	HBO
2025 (32nd)	Andor	Disney+
2025 (32nd)	Landman	Paramount+
2025 (32nd)	Squid Game	Netflix
2025 (32nd)	Stranger Things	Netflix

== Series with multiple awards or nominations ==
=== Multiple awards ===
8 awards

- Game of Thrones (7 consecutive)

2 awards

- 24
- The Last of Us

=== Multiple nominations ===
8 nominations

- Game of Thrones
- The Walking Dead

4 nominations

- Homeland
- Stranger Things

3 nominations

- 24 (including 24: Live Another Day)
- Boardwalk Empire
- The Boys
- Dexter
- Glow
- Marvel's Daredevil
- Heroes
- The Unit
- Westworld

2 nominations

- Andor
- Breaking Bad
- The Closer
- Cobra Kai
- The Last of Us
- The Mandalorian
- Sons of Anarchy
- Southland
- Squid Game
- True Blood
