= Actor Award for Outstanding Action Performance by a Stunt Ensemble in a Motion Picture =

Actor award

SAG Award for Best Stunt Ensemble
- Awarded for: Outstanding Performance by a Stunt Ensemble in a Motion Picture
- Location: Los Angeles, California
- Presented by: SAG-AFTRA
- Currently held by: Mission: Impossible – The Final Reckoning (2025)
- Website: sagawards.org

The Screen Actors Guild Award for Outstanding Performance by a Stunt Ensemble in a Motion Picture is one of the awards given by the Screen Actors Guild.

The award recognizes the work of stunt performers and coordinators and was first presented at the 14th Screen Actors Guild Awards in 2007, alongside a corresponding SAG Award for stunt work in television.

== Winners and nominees ==
Legend:

indicates the winners.

=== 2000s ===
Year	Film
2007 (14th)	The Bourne Ultimatum
2007 (14th)	300
2007 (14th)	I Am Legend
2007 (14th)	The Kingdom
2007 (14th)	Pirates of the Caribbean: At World's End
2008 (15th)	The Dark Knight
2008 (15th)	Hellboy II: The Golden Army
2008 (15th)	Indiana Jones and the Kingdom of the Crystal Skull
2008 (15th)	Iron Man
2008 (15th)	Wanted
2009 (16th)	Star Trek
2009 (16th)	Public Enemies
2009 (16th)	Transformers: Revenge of the Fallen

=== 2010s ===
Year	Film
2010 (17th)	Inception
2010 (17th)	Green Zone
2010 (17th)	Robin Hood
2011 (18th)	Harry Potter and the Deathly Hallows – Part 2
2011 (18th)	The Adjustment Bureau
2011 (18th)	Cowboys & Aliens
2011 (18th)	Transformers: Dark of the Moon
2011 (18th)	X-Men: First Class
2012 (19th)	Skyfall
2012 (19th)	The Amazing Spider-Man
2012 (19th)	The Bourne Legacy
2012 (19th)	The Dark Knight Rises
2012 (19th)	Les Misérables
2013 (20th)	Lone Survivor
2013 (20th)	All Is Lost
2013 (20th)	Fast & Furious 6
2013 (20th)	Rush
2013 (20th)	The Wolverine
2014 (21st)	Unbroken
2014 (21st)	Fury
2014 (21st)	Get on Up
2014 (21st)	The Hobbit: The Battle of the Five Armies
2014 (21st)	X-Men: Days of Future Past
2015 (22nd)	Mad Max: Fury Road
2015 (22nd)	Everest
2015 (22nd)	Furious 7
2015 (22nd)	Jurassic World
2015 (22nd)	Mission: Impossible – Rogue Nation
2016 (23rd)	Hacksaw Ridge
2016 (23rd)	Captain America: Civil War
2016 (23rd)	Doctor Strange
2016 (23rd)	Jason Bourne
2016 (23rd)	Nocturnal Animals
2017 (24th)	Wonder Woman
2017 (24th)	Baby Driver
2017 (24th)	Dunkirk
2017 (24th)	Logan
2017 (24th)	War for the Planet of the Apes
2018 (25th)	Black Panther
2018 (25th)	Ant-Man and the Wasp
2018 (25th)	Avengers: Infinity War
2018 (25th)	The Ballad of Buster Scruggs
2018 (25th)	Mission: Impossible – Fallout
2019 (26th)	Avengers: Endgame
2019 (26th)	Ford v Ferrari
2019 (26th)	The Irishman
2019 (26th)	Joker
2019 (26th)	Once Upon a Time in Hollywood

=== 2020s ===
Year	Film
2020 (27th)	Wonder Woman 1984
2020 (27th)	Da 5 Bloods
2020 (27th)	Mulan
2020 (27th)	News of the World
2020 (27th)	The Trial of the Chicago 7
2021 (28th)	No Time to Die
2021 (28th)	Black Widow
2021 (28th)	Dune
2021 (28th)	The Matrix Resurrections
2021 (28th)	Shang-Chi and the Legend of the Ten Rings
2022 (29th)	Top Gun: Maverick
2022 (29th)	Avatar: The Way of Water
2022 (29th)	The Batman
2022 (29th)	Black Panther: Wakanda Forever
2022 (29th)	The Woman King
2023 (30th)	Mission: Impossible – Dead Reckoning Part One
2023 (30th)	Barbie
2023 (30th)	Guardians of the Galaxy Vol. 3
2023 (30th)	Indiana Jones and the Dial of Destiny
2023 (30th)	John Wick: Chapter 4
2024 (31st)	The Fall Guy
2024 (31st)	Deadpool & Wolverine
2024 (31st)	Dune: Part Two
2024 (31st)	Gladiator II
2024 (31st)	Wicked
2025 (32nd)	Mission: Impossible – The Final Reckoning
2025 (32nd)	F1
2025 (32nd)	Frankenstein
2025 (32nd)	One Battle After Another
2025 (32nd)	Sinners

== Franchises ==
=== Multiple awards ===
2 Wins

- James Bond
- Marvel Cinematic Universe
- Mission: Impossible
- Wonder Woman

=== Multiple nominations ===
12 Nominations

- Marvel Cinematic Universe

5 Nominations

- X-Men

4 Nominations

- Mission: Impossible

3 Nominations

- Batman
- Bourne

2 Nominations

- Black Panther
- Dune
- Fast & Furious
- Indiana Jones
- James Bond
- Transformers
- Wonder Woman
