= Nick Jones (writer) =

American playwright, screenwriter, and performer (born 1978)

Nick Jones (born 1978) is an American, Alaskan born playwright, screenwriter, and performer. In television, he is known for working as a writer and producer on the first four seasons of the Netflix series, Orange is the New Black, as well as the Netflix series GLOW. He has also written several critically acclaimed works for the theater, including the 2008 puppet rock musical, Jollyship the Whiz-Bang (in which he also starred) The Coward, (2010) and Trevor (2013). The Coward won two Lortel Awards (for Kristen Schaal and Gabriel Berry). Circle X Theatre's 2015 production of Trevor, starring Jimmi Simpson and Laurie Metcalf, was nominated for six and won four Ovation Awards, including Best Playwriting. It also won the LA Critics Circle award for Playwriting. Artists Repertory Theatre staged the Northwest premiere of Trevor from September 6 to October 2, 2016.

== Plays ==
- Little Building
- Jollyship the Whiz-Bang
- The Nosemaker's Apprentice (with Rachel Shukert)
- The Sporting Life (with Rachel Shukert)
- Straight up Vampire: the History of Vampires in Colonial Pennsylvania as Performed to the Music of Paula Abdul
- The Coward
- The Wundelsteipen, and Other Roles for Young People
- Trevor
- Grizzly
- Verité
- Salome of the Moon
- Important Hats of the Twentieth Century
