= Carly Mensch =

American dramatist

- Education: Dartmouth College (BA); Juilliard School (GrDip)
- Occupations: Playwright, television writer, producer
- Years active: 2007-present
- Television: GLOW
- Spouse: Latif Nasser

Carly Mensch is an American playwright, television writer, and producer. She created an Off-Broadway play called Len, Asleep in Vinyl, which was later adapted into a film, Len and Company. She also created a play Oblivion, which played at the Westport County Playhouse, as well as a play called All Hail Hurricane Gordo. She has written and produced for Weeds, Nurse Jackie, and Orange is the New Black. She co-created (with Liz Flahive) the Netflix series GLOW, which she wrote for and executive produced. For her work on GLOW, she was nominated for an Primetime Emmy Award for Outstanding Comedy Series in 2018.

Mensch graduated from Dartmouth College in 2005 and is married to fellow Dartmouth alumnus Latif Nasser, the director of research and co-host of Radiolab.
