= GLOW (TV series) =

American comedy-drama television series

- Genre: Comedy drama Sports
- Created by: Liz Flahive; Carly Mensch
- Starring: Alison Brie; Betty Gilpin; Sydelle Noel; Britney Young; Marc Maron; Britt Baron; Kate Nash; Gayle Rankin; Kia Stevens; Jackie Tohn; Ellen Wong; Chris Lowell
- Opening theme: "The Warrior" by Scandal
- Composers: Craig Wedren; Pink Ape
- Country of origin: United States
- Original language: English
- No. of seasons: 3
- No. of episodes: 30 (list of episodes)

Production
- Executive producers: Liz Flahive; Carly Mensch; Jenji Kohan; Tara Herrmann
- Cinematography: Christian Sprenger; Adrian Peng Correia; Chris Teague
- Running time: 26–46 minutes
- Production companies: Tilted Productions; Perhapsatron; Fan Dancer

Original release
- Network: Netflix
- Release: June 23, 2017 – August 9, 2019

GLOW is an American comedy-drama television series created by Liz Flahive and Carly Mensch for Netflix. The series revolves around a fictionalization of the characters and gimmicks of the 1980s syndicated women's professional wrestling circuit Gorgeous Ladies of Wrestling (or GLOW) founded by David McLane.

The first season consists of 10 episodes and was released on June 23, 2017. In August, Netflix renewed the series for a second season, which was released on June 29, 2018. The third season was released on August 9, 2019. The following month, the series was renewed for a fourth and final season, but Netflix canceled it in October 2020 due to financial and production issues caused by the COVID-19 pandemic.

== Premise ==
In Los Angeles in 1985, Ruth Wilder, a struggling actress, auditions along with many other women in a fledgling professional wrestling promotion called the Gorgeous Ladies of Wrestling (GLOW). Traditionally minded in her approach to acting and highly idealistic, she clashes with GLOW's director Sam Sylvia due to his cynical demeanor and often unconventional work style. Ruth discovers early on that Sylvia has employed her former best friend, retired soap opera actress Debbie Eagan, to star in the show. Ruth and Debbie had fallen out with one another after Ruth had an affair with Debbie's husband, Mark, whom Debbie then divorced. The tension between the two women promises either to make or break the developing show. The series follows the personal and professional lives of the fictional show's numerous cast and crew as they navigate the 1980s in Southern California and Nevada.

== Cast ==
=== Main ===
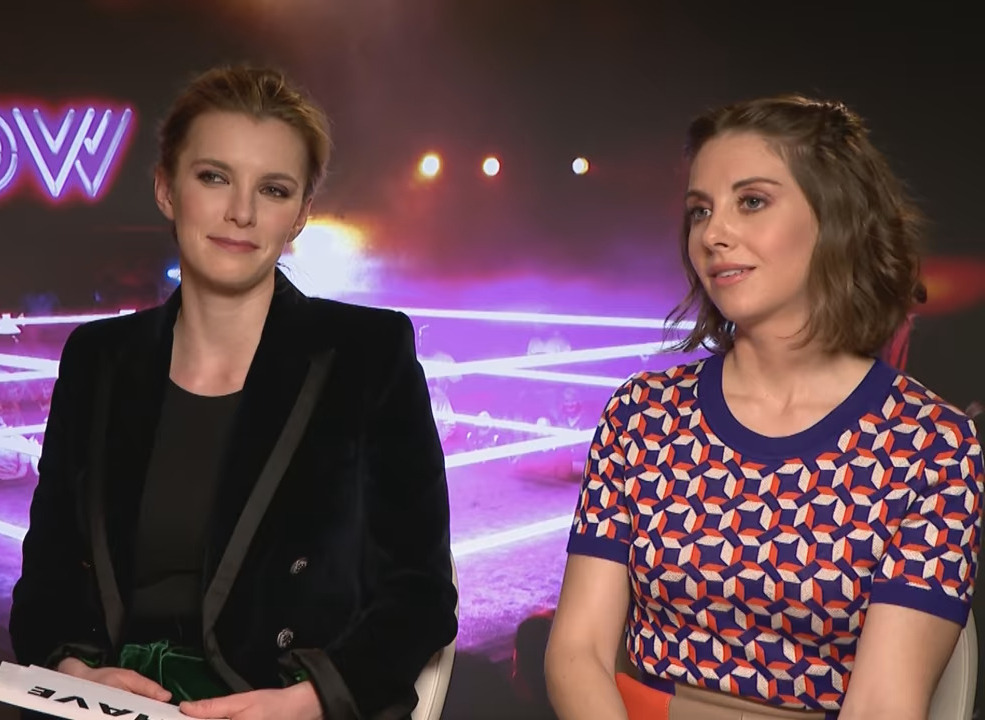
Betty Gilpin (left) and Alison Brie in 2018

- Alison Brie as Ruth "Zoya the Destroya" Wilder
- Betty Gilpin as Debbie "Liberty Belle" Eagan
- Sydelle Noel as Cherry "Junkchain"/"Black Magic" Bang
- Britney Young as Carmen "Machu Picchu" Wade
- Marc Maron as Sam Sylvia
- Britt Baron as Justine "Scab" Biagi (seasons 2–3; recurring season 1)
- Kate Nash as Rhonda "Britannica" Richardson (seasons 2–3; recurring season 1)
- Gayle Rankin as Sheila "The She Wolf" (seasons 2–3; recurring season 1)
- Kia Stevens as Tammé "The Welfare Queen" Dawson (seasons 2–3; recurring season 1)
- Jackie Tohn as Melanie "Melrose" Rosen (seasons 2–3; recurring season 1)
- Chris Lowell as Sebastian "Bash" Howard (season 3; recurring seasons 1–2)

=== Recurring ===
==== Introduced in season one ====
- Bashir Salahuddin as Keith Bang
- Rich Sommer as Mark Eagan
- Sunita Mani as Arthie "Beirut the Mad Bomber" Premkumar
- Ellen Wong as Jenny "Fortune Cookie" Chey
- Kimmy Gatewood as Stacey "Ethel Rosenblatt"/"Ozone" Beswick
- Rebekka Johnson as Dawn "Edna Rosenblatt"/"Nuke" Rivecca
- Marianna Palka as Reggie "Vicky the Viking" Walsh
- Alex Rich as Florian Becker
- Andrew Friedman as Glen Klitnick
- Casey Johnson as Billy Offal
- Ravil Isyanov as Gregory
- Marc Evan Jackson as Gary
- Elizabeth Perkins as Birdie Howard

==== Introduced in season two ====
- Shakira Barrera as Yolanda "Junkchain" Rivas
- Victor Quinaz as Russell Barroso
- Horatio Sanz as Ray
- Annabella Sciorra as Rosalie Biagi
- Wyatt Nash as Phil
- Patrick Renna as Toby “Cupcake” Matkins
- Phoebe Strole as Susan
- Eli Goree as Earnest Dawson
- Paul Fitzgerald as Tom Grant

==== Introduced in season three ====
- Geena Davis as Sandy Devereaux St. Clair
- Breeda Wool as Denise
- Kevin Cahoon as Bobby Barnes
- Toby Huss as J. J. "Tex" McCready
- Nick Clifford as Paul

The show's cast features several real-life professional wrestlers, most prominently Kia Stevens (Tammé), who has wrestled as Awesome Kong for TNA and AEW while wrestling as Kharma for WWE. Others with formal experience include:

- John Hennigan as Salty "The Sack" Johnson, a trainer who appeared in the first episode of Season 1
- Tyrus and Carlos Edwin as Carmen's wrestler brothers
- Joey Ryan as a wrestler known as Mr. Monopoly
- Laura James as Mr. Monopoly's valet, "Crystal"
- Alex Riley as a wrestler known as Steel Horse
- Brooke Hogan as night club manager Amber Fredrickson
- Chavo Guerrero Jr. as Chico Guapo
- Christopher Daniels and Frankie Kazarian as unnamed wrestlers

Hulk Hogan, Ric Flair, and Gorgeous George appear in archived video footage in episodes 1 and 4.

== Episodes ==
Season	Episodes	Originally released
1	10	June 23, 2017
2	10	June 29, 2018
3	10	August 9, 2019

== Production ==
The idea for the series came when Flahive and Mensch, who at the time were looking to make a new female-centric show, came across the 2012 documentary GLOW: The Story of the Gorgeous Ladies of Wrestling. Before this, neither woman had heard of the GLOW wrestling promotion, and they became intrigued by the premise of producing a fictionalized version of it. They found the storyline intriguing as a way of exploring the aftermath of the 1970s Woman's Liberation Movement, with Flahive telling Rolling Stone, "We wanted to look back on the 1970s, coming out of the women's movement, and into the 1980s, and ask the question: Did it work? Did things get better?" To this end, it was important for the series to maintain a tension between whether the league was exploiting women or empowering them.

Ursula Hayden, the owner of the GLOW company, served as a consultant on the series and helped Flahive and Mensch with creating the show. Hayden was also on the original 1980s promotion as Babe, the Farmer's Daughter.

Chavo Guerrero Jr. of the famous Guerrero wrestling family also served as a consultant on the series and helped train the actresses. His uncle, Mando Guerrero, had served in the same role for the original series. Guerrero Jr. also appeared in two episodes of the second season, including the season finale.

=== Filming ===
The series filmed in several locations in Los Angeles; mainly in the San Fernando Valley. Chavo's Boxing Gym, which is GLOW's training grounds, was a combination of two locations: the interior was a studio set while the exterior was the rear of the San Fernando Masonic Lodge. The Pink Motel in Sun Valley was used as a stand-in for The Dusty Spur Motel, GLOW's sleeping quarters. Other locations included the Mayan Theater and the Hollywood Palladium.

Principal production on the second season began in October 2017.

=== Marketing ===
For the Spain market, Netflix España released a series of promo videos featuring singers Marta Sánchez and Vicky Larraz. The first video, titled "No Controles", features Sánchez imitating Ruth's imaginary wrestler scene from the first episode. The second video has Sánchez and Larraz squaring off in the ring.

For the Brazil market, Netflix Brasil released a promo video featuring singers Gretchen and Rita Cadillac auditioning for GLOW.

Funko released Pop! Vinyl figures of Ruth and Debbie in mid-2018.

=== Canceled final season ===
In September 2019, Netflix renewed the show for a fourth and final season. On February 19, 2020, Alison Brie posted a photo from the set on Instagram, signaling that they were beginning production on the final episodes. In March 2020, production on the season was shut down due to the COVID-19 pandemic, which had stopped nearly all TV and film productions in Los Angeles. They had already completed the first episode and were about to start filming the second.

On October 5, 2020, creators Liz Flahive and Carly Mensch announced that the fourth season was canceled and would not be completed or aired. It was explained that the show had some of the biggest obstacles to overcome as Netflix was trying to figure out how to get their shows back to work, mostly due to uncertainty about how to prevent an outbreak on set with its wrestling theme and increased COVID-19–related costs added to an already expensive budget. The earliest the show's final season would have aired was in 2022, which would have been too long of a gap for Netflix to handle, as the previous season aired in 2019.

== Soundtrack ==
The series features several songs from the 1980s, as well as tracks from the 1950s, 1960s, and 1970s. The opening theme used for the full-length opening titles in episode 1 of each season is "The Warrior" by Scandal.

Season 1 songs

1. "You Make Me Feel (Mighty Real)" by Sylvester
2. "Separate Ways (Worlds Apart)" by Journey
3. "Stir It Up" by Patti LaBelle
4. "The Look" by Roxette
5. "We Don't Get Along" by The Go-Go's
6. "4-3-1" by The Jetzons
7. "Every Little Bit" by Jackie James
8. "Life in a Northern Town" by The Dream Academy
9. "Movin' Out (Anthony's Song)" by Billy Joel
10. "Head Over Heels" by Tears for Fears
11. "Make That Money (Scrooge's Song)" by Alice Cooper
12. "Rock You Like a Hurricane (2011 Re-recording)" by Scorpions
13. "Ready Steady Go" by Generation X
14. "Dare" by Stan Bush
15. "Theme of Exodus" by Ernest Gold
16. "Angel" by The Jetzons
17. "Under Pressure" by Queen and David Bowie
18. "Car Wash" by Rose Royce
19. "Magic Moments" by Perry Como
20. "Things Can Only Get Better" by Howard Jones
21. "Invincible" by Pat Benatar

Season 2 songs

1. "You May Be Right" by Billy Joel
2. "Just Like Honey" by The Jesus and Mary Chain
3. "It's Like That" by Run-DMC
4. "Sweat" by The System
5. "Situation" by Yazoo
6. "Baby You Got It" by Brenton Wood
7. "You're All I Need to Get By" by Aretha Franklin
8. "Smalltown Boy" by Bronski Beat
9. "I Know What Boys Like" by The Waitresses
10. "Far From Over" by Frank Stallone
11. "You Make My Dreams" by Hall & Oates
12. "Destination Unknown" by Missing Persons
13. "Makeover" by the GLOW Girls
14. "Don't Kidnap" by the GLOW Girls
15. "Kyrie" by Mr. Mister
16. "Cross My Heart" by Richard Myhill
17. "Can't You See the World Through My Eyes?" by Donnie Barren
18. "Don't You Want Me" by The Human League
19. "Crazy for You" by Madonna
20. "Man on the Corner" by Genesis
21. "Chapel of Love" by The Dixie Cups
22. "Nothing's Gonna Stop Us Now" by Starship

Season 3 songs

1. "Quando quando quando" by Engelbert Humperdinck
2. "Baby Let Me Kiss You" by Fern Kinney
3. "Disorder" by Joy Division
4. "Big Mess" by Devo
5. "Gypsy" by Fleetwood Mac
6. "Light of a Clear Blue Morning" by Dolly Parton
7. "When the Chips Are Down" by Ricky Nelson
8. "Cities in Dust" by Siouxsie and the Banshees
9. "Barracuda" by Heart
10. "Running Up That Hill" by Kate Bush

Quiet Riot's cover of "Cum On Feel the Noize" was used for the Season 1 trailer, while "Maniac" by Michael Sembello was used for the Season 2 trailer and "Listen to Your Heart" by Roxette for the Season 3 trailer. Songs covered by the cast include the Thompson Twins' "Hold Me Now" and Barbra Streisand's "This Is One of Those Moments".

== Reception ==
=== Critical response ===
GLOW was praised by critics upon its release. On Rotten Tomatoes, season 1 has a 94% approval rating with an average score of 7.7/10 based on 108 reviews. The site's critical consensus reads, "With spot-on 1980s period detail, knockout writing, and a killer cast, GLOW shines brightly." The first season has a Metacritic score of 81 out of 100, based on 37 critics, indicating "universal acclaim". Darren Franich of Entertainment Weekly gave the first season an A rating, calling it "a silly-smart masterpiece, with an ensemble cast entirely made up of breakout characters". Sophie Gilbert of The Atlantic said, "...it's just a blast to watch women having so much fun. GLOW fully owns its campiness and its showy aesthetics, but it's smart and subversive underneath the glitter."

The second season received even higher critical acclaim. On Rotten Tomatoes, season 2 has a 98% approval rating with an average score of 8.8/10 based on 86 reviews. The site's critical consensus reads, "Fearlessly led by its excellent ensemble, GLOW's second season adds a new layer of drama without sacrificing its self-effacing, delightfully silly humor." The second season has a Metacritic score of 85 out of 100, based on 20 critics, indicating "universal acclaim".

On Rotten Tomatoes, the third season has an 87% approval rating with an average score of 8/10 based on 68 reviews. The site's critical consensus reads, "GLOW dives even deeper into the lives of its divas to deliver a knock-out third season that solidifies its place as one of TV's most compelling—and hilarious—character studies." The third season has a Metacritic score of 80 out of 100, based on 17 critics, indicating "generally favorable reviews".

=== Pro-wrestling community response ===
The series received mixed reactions from some of the original GLOW wrestlers. Jeanne Basone, who wrestled in the promotion as "Hollywood", commented that "Some of the training and the gym and the outfits they get correct." Patricia Summerland, who played "Sunny the California Girl" in the promotion, saw Marc Maron's character Sam Sylvia as a stark contrast to original GLOW director Matt Cimber. Eileen O'Hara, who was known as "Melody Trouble Vixen (MTV)", felt that the series did not properly acknowledge how groundbreaking they were. Lisa Moretti, who competed as "Tina Ferrari" and would go on to the greatest fame among GLOW alumnae as Ivory in the WWF/WWE as a three-time WWF Women's Champion during the Attitude Era, said that she was relieved that the series isn't a documentary because it was more entertaining to have a mix between fact and fiction.

More positive reception came from mainstream wrestling figures including Kurt Angle. Ethan Sapienza of Slate noted accurate comparisons between the series and WWE as well as the various regional promotions that made up the National Wrestling Alliance during its heyday.

=== Accolades ===
Year	Award	Category	Nominee(s)	Result	Ref.
2018	American Cinema Editors Awards	Best Edited Comedy Series for Non-Commercial Television	William Turro	Nominated	
2018	Art Directors Guild Awards	Half-Hour Single-Camera Series	Todd Fjelsted	Won	
2018	Costume Designers Guild Awards	Excellence in Period Television	Beth Morgan	Nominated	
2018	Critics' Choice Television Awards	Best Comedy Series	GLOW	Nominated	
2018	Critics' Choice Television Awards	Best Actress in a Comedy Series	Alison Brie	Nominated	
2018	Critics' Choice Television Awards	Best Supporting Actor in a Comedy Series	Marc Maron	Nominated	
2018	Critics' Choice Television Awards	Best Supporting Actress in a Comedy Series	Betty Gilpin	Nominated	
2018	Golden Globe Awards	Best Actress – Television Series Musical or Comedy	Alison Brie	Nominated	
2018	Make-Up Artists and Hair Stylists Guild Awards	TV and New Media Series – Best Period / Character Make-Up	Lana Horochowski and Maurine Burke	Nominated	
2018	Make-Up Artists and Hair Stylists Guild Awards	TV and New Media Series – Best Period / Character Hair Styling	Theraesa Rivers, Valerie Jackson	Nominated	
2018	People's Choice Awards	The Bingeworthy Show of 2018	GLOW	Shortlisted	
2018	Primetime Emmy Awards	Outstanding Comedy Series	GLOW	Nominated	
2018	Primetime Emmy Awards	Outstanding Supporting Actress in a Comedy Series	Betty Gilpin	Nominated	
2018	Primetime Emmy Awards	Outstanding Directing for a Comedy Series	Jesse Peretz (for "Pilot")	Nominated	
2018	Primetime Emmy Awards	Outstanding Casting for a Comedy Series	Jennifer Euston and Elizabeth Barnes	Nominated	
2018	Primetime Emmy Awards	Outstanding Cinematography for a Single-Camera Series (Half-Hour)	Christian Sprenger (for "Pilot")	Nominated	
2018	Primetime Emmy Awards	Outstanding Hairstyling for a Single-Camera Series	Theraesa Rivers, Valerie Jackson, Leslie Bennett and Jules Holdren (for "Pilot")	Nominated	
2018	Primetime Emmy Awards	Outstanding Main Title Design	Jason Groves, Christopher Harding and Richard Kenworthy	Nominated	
2018	Primetime Emmy Awards	Outstanding Makeup for a Single-Camera Series (Non-Prosthetic)	Lana Horochowski, Maurine Burke, Lesa Nielson Duff, Melissa Buell and Kristina Frisch (for "Money's in the Chase")	Nominated	
2018	Primetime Emmy Awards	Outstanding Production Design for a Narrative Program (Half-Hour or Less)	Todd Fjelsted, Harry Otto and Ryan Watson (for "The Dusty Spur")	Won	
2018	Primetime Emmy Awards	Outstanding Stunt Coordination for a Comedy Series or Variety Program	Shauna Diggins	Won	
2018	Satellite Awards	Best Musical or Comedy Series	GLOW	Won	
2018	Satellite Awards	Best Actress in a Musical or Comedy Series	Alison Brie	Nominated	
2018	Screen Actors Guild Awards	Outstanding Performance by an Ensemble in a Comedy Series	The cast of GLOW	Nominated	
2018	Screen Actors Guild Awards	Outstanding Performance by a Male Actor in a Comedy Series	Marc Maron	Nominated	
2018	Screen Actors Guild Awards	Outstanding Performance by a Female Actor in a Comedy Series	Alison Brie	Nominated	
2018	Screen Actors Guild Awards	Outstanding Performance by a Stunt Ensemble in a Television Series	GLOW stunt ensemble	Nominated	
2018	Writers Guild of America Awards	Comedy Series	Arabella Anderson, Kristoffer Diaz, Liz Flahive, Tara Herrmann, Nick Jones, Jenji Kohan, Carly Mensch, Emma Rathbone, Sascha Rothchild and Rachel Shukert	Nominated	
2018	Writers Guild of America Awards	New Series	Arabella Anderson, Kristoffer Diaz, Liz Flahive, Tara Herrmann, Nick Jones, Jenji Kohan, Carly Mensch, Emma Rathbone, Sascha Rothchild and Rachel Shukert	Nominated	
2019	Critics' Choice Television Awards	Best Supporting Actress in a Comedy Series	Betty Gilpin	Nominated	
2019	Screen Actors Guild Awards	Outstanding Performance by a Female Actor in a Comedy Series	Alison Brie	Nominated	
2019	Screen Actors Guild Awards	Outstanding Performance by an Ensemble in a Comedy Series	The cast of GLOW	Nominated	
2019	Screen Actors Guild Awards	Outstanding Performance by a Stunt Ensemble in a Television Series	GLOW stunt ensemble	Won	
2019	Satellite Awards	Best Actress in a Musical or Comedy Series	Alison Brie	Nominated	
2019	Primetime Emmy Awards	Outstanding Supporting Actress in a Comedy Series	Betty Gilpin	Nominated	
2019	Primetime Emmy Awards	Outstanding Period Costumes	Beth Morgan, Alexandra Casey and Sharon Taylor Sampson ("Every Potato Has a Receipt")	Nominated	
2019	Primetime Emmy Awards	Outstanding Hairstyling for a Single-Camera Series	Theraesa Rivers, Valerie Jackson, Mishell Chandler, Deborah Pierce, Loretta Nero and Jason Green ("The Good Twin")	Nominated	
2019	Primetime Emmy Awards	Outstanding Makeup for a Single-Camera Series (Non-Prosthetic)	Lana Horochowski, Maurine Burke, Lesa Nielson Duff, Melissa Buell and Kristina Frisch ("The Good Twin")	Nominated	
2019	Primetime Emmy Awards	Outstanding Stunt Coordination for a Comedy Series or Variety Program	Shauna Duggins	Won	
2019	Satellite Awards	Best Actress in a Musical or Comedy Series	Alison Brie	Nominated	
2020	Costume Designers Guild Awards	Excellence in Period Television	Beth Morgan (for "Freaky Tuesday")	Nominated	
2020	Critics' Choice Television Awards	Best Actress in a Comedy Series	Alison Brie	Nominated	
2020	Critics' Choice Television Awards	Best Supporting Actress in a Comedy Series	Betty Gilpin	Nominated	
2020	Make-Up Artists and Hair Stylists Guilds	Television Series, Mini-Series or New Media – Best Period and/or Character Make-Up	Lana Horochowski and Maurine Burke	Nominated	
2020	Make-Up Artists and Hair Stylists Guilds	Television Series, Mini-Series or New Media – Best Period and/or Character Hair Styling	Theraesa Rivers and Valerie Jackson	Nominated	
2020	Screen Actors Guild Awards	Outstanding Performance by a Stunt Ensemble in a Television Series	GLOW stunt ensemble	Nominated	
2020	Casting Society of America	Television Series – Comedy	Jennifer Euston, Elizabeth Barnes and Seth Caskey	Nominated	
2020	Art Directors Guild Awards	Half-Hour Single-Camera Series	Todd Fjelsted	Nominated	
2020	Primetime Emmy Awards	Outstanding Supporting Actress in a Comedy Series	Betty Gilpin	Nominated	
2020	Primetime Emmy Awards	Outstanding Production Design for a Narrative Program (Half-Hour or Less)	Todd Fjelsted, Valerie Green and Cynthia Slagter (for "Up, Up, Up")	Nominated	
2020	Primetime Emmy Awards	Outstanding Sound Editing for a Comedy or Drama Series (Half-Hour) and Animation	Robb Navrides, Colette Dahanne, Jason Lezama, David Beadle, Jason Krane, Larry Hopkins, Emily Kwong, Lindsay Pepper and Zane Bruce (for "The Libertines")	Nominated	

== Comic book ==
A four-issue comic book series based on the show was released in March 2019 by IDW Publishing, written by Tini Howard and illustrated by Hannah Templer. Flahive and Mensch served as executive producers on the comics. A second four-issue series by IDW Publishing, GLOW vs. The Babyface, co-written by former professional wrestler AJ Mendez and actress Aimee Garcia and illustrated by Templer, published its first issue in November 2019, with issues 2-4 released from December 2019 through February 2020.

== In media ==
Sydelle Noel, Britney Young, Kia Stevens, Ellen Wong and Jackie Tohn made a cameo appearance as their GLOW characters in the music video for the 2017 Katy Perry song "Swish Swish".

== See also ==
- Heels
