= Britney Young =

American actress (born c.1987)

- Born: 1987 or 1988 (age 37–38); Tokyo, Japan
- Occupation: Actress
- Years active: 2012–present

Britney Young (born 1987/1988) is an American actress, best known for her role as Carmen "Machu Picchu" Wade in GLOW.

== Early life ==
Britney Young was born in Tokyo and raised in Eagle River, Alaska. Her father is African-American, and her mother is European-American. She has a bachelor's degree from the USC School of Cinematic Arts in Los Angeles. In June 2018 she was interviewed by Glamour about overcoming childhood bullying and persistent Hollywood stereotypes.

== Selected television ==
| Year | Title | Role | Notes |
|---|---|---|---|
| 2016, 2018 | Crazy Ex-Girlfriend | Nicky Warner | 3 episodes |
| 2016 | Those Who Can't | Little Debbie | 7 episodes |
| 2016 | Better Things | Meryl | Episode: "Period" |
| 2017–19 | GLOW | Carmen Wade | 29 episodes |
| 2018 | The Librarians (2014 TV series) | Aurora | Season 4 episode 10 |
| 2025 | Chicago Fire | Carla | Episode: "Permanent Damage" |
| 2025 | Paradise (2025 TV series) | Yvonne | Episode: "Mayday" |
| 2026 | The Pitt | Carrie Cohen | Episode: “6:00 PM” |
