= Liz Flahive =

American playwright, television producer and writer

- Occupations: Playwright, producer, writer
- Years active: 2011-
- Television: GLOW

Liz Flahive is an American playwright, television producer and writer. Beginning her career as a playwright, Flahive wrote two plays, From Up Here and The Madrid. She acted as a producer, executive story editor, and writer on Nurse Jackie, as well as a producer and writer for Homeland. She later co-created, executive produced, and wrote the Netflix comedy GLOW, for which she was nominated for a Primetime Emmy Award for Outstanding Comedy Series in 2018. She also co-wrote the film Adult Beginners and helped write the Marvel film Captain Marvel.
