= Big Little Lies =

Big Little Lies may refer to:

- Big Little Lies (novel), a 2014 novel written by Liane Moriarty
- Big Little Lies (TV series), a 2017 American television series based on the novel adapted by David E. Kelley
- "Big Little Lies", an episode of Queer Eye (2018 TV series)
