= Here One Moment =

2024 novel by Australian Liane Moriarty

- Author: Liane Moriarty
- Language: English
- Subject: Thriller, Psychic, fiction
- Publisher: Crown Publishing Group
- Publication date: 10 September 2024
- Media type: Print (hardcover, audiobook and Kindle)
- Pages: 512
- ISBN: 9780593798607

Here One Moment is the tenth novel written by Australian author Liane Moriarty. It was published in 2024 by Crown Publishing Group and tells the fictional story of a psychic who while walking past seated passengers on a plane flying from Hobart, Australia to Sydney informs the passengers of the cause and year of their upcoming deaths.

== Synopsis ==
On a flight from Hobart to Sydney, Australia, a woman stands up and moves though the cabin, pointing at the seated passengers and without asking for permission, states how each person will die and how old they will be when it happens. This unnerves many of the passengers and the book follows these characters after-the-fact. How they dealt with this knowledge was different for each person -- some accepted their fate, others took steps to keep the death from happening, while still others changed their lives believing they had a short time left. Readers do not learn of the identity of the psychic or her history until page 92. Her name is Cherry and her mother was also a psychic medium. “'Fate won’t be fought,'” she says. Then the plane lands, and its passengers have to figure out how to go about their lives with these predictions in mind." The passengers find each other post-flight and create a Facebook group to discuss the aftermath, calling the psychic "The Death Lady". Three deaths occur in strangely odd ways similar to what had been predicted.

== Background ==
In an interview for People Moriarty explained that she had had little experience with psychics before writing the book. Once when she was in her thirties, she sat for a tarot reading, and asked if she would have children. The reader said "of course". Later when researching Here One Moment she had another reader who told her things that seemed predictable based on her age. The fortune teller asked many questions including about what career Moriarty had. When she said, "I write books" the psychic responded, "I think you should do pretty well with that". Moriarty identifies as a skeptic and stated in the interview that she would "'love to believe'" but "so far, her experiences with them have not "'amazed'" her."

Moriarty explains that the inspiration for Here One Moment started out much like the book does, while she was waiting for a flight out of Hobart, Tasmania. She was sitting waiting, without a book to distract her and she started looking around at her fellow passengers and the thought hit her, that someday, everyone in the room would die. She thinks that this thought struck her because she and her sister had breast cancer, and her father had died a few years before. Moriarty realized that she and her friends have been talking about their illnesses and mortality often. "The thought came into my head that one day, the data on how every single person on this plane — their ages and cause of death — will be known. And for some reason, that sort of blew my mind. That those facts will one day be available. And that’s when I thought, imagine if that information was available right now."

== Reception ==
Deputy editor Stephanie Merry for The Washington Post books section writes that sorting out the puzzle of the book "becomes less interesting than the myriad ways people react when confronted with their ephemerality. ... Her conclusions aren’t obvious, and they don’t necessarily give readers what they want, but they do induce a sense of sanguinity."

New York Times editor Leah Greenblatt writes that Here One Moment misses "the tug and wallop of a good, taut thriller" but seems more of a "work in progress still searching for its final form." Her characters may be archetypes, "but they’re well-drawn ones — and the gentle humor and unshowy emotional intelligence that undergirds it." Greenblatt also mentions that Moriarty is one of "the few mainstream fiction writers to consistently center the joys and tribulations of midlife and beyond".

Author and critic, Adele Dumont, reviewing for The Guardian, calls the plot "far-fetched" and the characters unmemorable. She argues that Moriarty over explains details that are not relevant to the plot, and adds that the book feels "disappointingly orderly". Despite mentions of sex, OCD, self-harm, and domestic violence which are referenced in the plot, "the reader is never remotely unsettled." Finally, she states that the ending of "this novel has a paint-by-numbers feel. For a book with such a macabre premise, it is disappointing that the end result is best described as beige."

The Colgate Maroon-News Hannah White calls the book "bold and the "execution is equally compelling". White writes that it takes a bit to follow the story as the structure feels "overwhelming" and it takes time to sort out the characters. She recommends the book to anyone seeking to "look inward".

In March 2025 Good Housekeeping ranked Here One Moment as the third best of the seven they had reviewed, with The Husband's Secret as number one and Big Little Lies as second. The Washington Post profiled thirteen new paperbacks for readers including Here One Moment.

Reviewer Adrienne Hill writing for Skeptical Inquirer felt unease while reading Here One Moment as the book "seemed like an endorsement of psychic phenomena" and she almost didn't finish the book though she normally enjoys Moriarty's novels. A board member for the Tourette OCD Alberta Network, Hill writes that the author does a good job describing the symptoms for depression and "smiling depression" which is less well known. She describes treatments for obsessive-compulsive disorder (OCD) and how harmful a belief in psychics can be. A high school mathematics teacher herself, Hill noticed in the second half of the book, "discussions of statistics and common fallacies slowly become more frequent". Hill wonders if believers in psychic phenomenon began reading Here One Moment only to be frustrated at the end when the truth about "The Death Lady's" psychic pronouncements came to light. Hill enjoyed the research Moriarty did concerning mental health, mathematics and the tricks psychics use to convince sitters of foresight. Hill mentions that Moriarty used Mark Edward's Psychic Blues: Confessions of a Conflicted Medium in her research.
