= Blossom Films =

American film production company

- Type: Private
- Industry: Production company
- Founded: 2010; 16 years ago
- Founders: Nicole Kidman; Per Saari
- Headquarters: United States

Blossom Films is a production company founded by American-born Australian actress Nicole Kidman in 2010. The first production by the company was the film Rabbit Hole, based on the play of the same name by David Lindsay-Abaire. Their logo features a blossom tree growing.

== History ==
In 2010, Kidman launched the production company Blossom Films together with Per Saari. The first project was Rabbit Hole starring Nicole Kidman, Dianne Wiest and Aaron Eckhart, followed by Monte Carlo starring Selena Gomez and Leighton Meester. The company also produced a film adaption of The Family Fang starring Jason Bateman and Kidman.

In June 2018, Blossom films signed a first-look deal with Amazon Studios for features, television series and digital content. Under the pact, Amazon and Kidman's Blossom Films will develop original series that will be available exclusively on Amazon Prime Video, as well as movies for theatrical release.

In May 2019, Hulu gave a straight-to-series order to the adaptation of Nine Perfect Strangers by Liane Moriarty, and it aired in 2021.

=== Upcoming projects ===
In July 2019, it was announced that WarnerMedia’s streaming service is developing a drama series titled Crime Farm with Kidman attached to executive produce under Blossom Films.

== Filmography ==
=== Films ===
Year	Film title	Director	Gross (worldwide)	Notes	Ref.
2010	Rabbit Hole	John Cameron Mitchell	$5.1 million	Nominated for 1 Academy Award	
2011	Monte Carlo	Thomas Bezucha	$39.7 million		
2015	The Family Fang	Jason Bateman	$585,165		
2025	Holland	Mimi Cave			
2026	Practical Magic 2	Susanne Bier			
TBA	Mice	Justin Kurzel			

=== Television ===
Year	Title	Creator	Network	Notes	Ref.
2017–2019	Big Little Lies	David E. Kelley	HBO	Season 1: Nominated for 16 Primetime Emmy Awards, won 8 Season 2: Nominated for 5 Primetime Emmy Awards	
2020	The Undoing	David E. Kelley	HBO	Nominated for 2 Primetime Emmy Awards	
2021–2025	Nine Perfect Strangers	David E. Kelley & John-Henry Butterworth	Hulu	TV	
2022	Roar	Liz Flahive & Carly Mensch	Apple TV+	Miniseries	
2023	Love & Death	David E. Kelley	HBO Max	Miniseries, Nominated for 1 Primetime Emmy Awards	
2023–2024	Lioness	Taylor Sheridan	Paramount+	TV	
2024	Expats	Lulu Wang	Amazon Video	Miniseries	
2024	The Perfect Couple	Jenna Lamia	Netflix	Miniseries	
2025	The Last Anniversary	Samantha Strauss	Binge	Miniseries	
2026–present	Scarpetta	Liz Sarnoff	Amazon Video	TV	
2026–present	Margo's Got Money Troubles	David E. Kelley	Apple TV	Season 1: Nominated for 8 Primetime Emmy Awards	
2027	Discretion	Chandler Baker	Paramount+		
TBA	The Perfect Nanny	Maya Erskine	HBO	Miniseries	
TBA	Crime Farm	Janine Sherman Barrois	WarnerMedia	Miniseries	
TBA	Pretty Things	Janelle Brown	Amazon Prime Video	Miniseries	
TBA	Hope	Alice Bell	Amazon Prime Video	Miniseries	
TBA	Things I Know To Be True	TBD	Amazon Video	TV	
TBA	Truly Madly Guilty	TBD	HBO	TV	
