= Feeling Sorry for Celia =

Book by Jaclyn Moriarty

- First edition
- Author: Jaclyn Moriarty
- Language: English
- Genre: Novel
- Publisher: Pan Macmillan
- Publication date: 2000
- Publication place: Australia
- Media type: Print (Hardback & Paperback) & AudioBook
- ISBN: 978-0-330-36210-8 (first edition, paperback)
- Followed by: Finding Cassie Crazy

Feeling Sorry for Celia is a young adult novel by Jaclyn Moriarty. It was first published in 2000 by Pan Macmillan. The story is told in a series of letters.

== Plot ==
The story's protagonist is a 15-year-old-girl named Elizabeth Clarry. Elizabeth lives in a suburb of Sydney, Australia, with her mother and her dog, a collie named Lochie. The story begins when Elizabeth, who attends an exclusive private school called Ashbury, is forced to begin a letter correspondence with a student from the local comprehensive high school (Brookfield), by her new English teacher, Mr. Botherit. The recipient of Elizabeth's letter is a girl named Christina Kratovac. Elizabeth and Christina become friends almost immediately. Elizabeth confides in Christina as she feels very alone and confused about her life. She does not fit in at Ashbury and she has an awkward relationship with her father (who left Elizabeth's mother when she was pregnant and moved to Canada with another woman and her son), who has just been reintroduced into her life in a permanent way. But mainly, her concerns revolve around her best friend, an awkward, free-spirited girl named Celia Buckley who has run away from home without leaving any details as to her whereabouts. Added to this are the barrage of letters that Elizabeth constantly receives from various societies and clubs, each pointing out her faults and generally bringing her down. The letters are reflections of Elizabeth's own subconscious thoughts and are not actually real.

Eventually, Elizabeth learns of Celia's whereabouts (she joined a circus) but grows more concerned than before as Celia's letters make it seem like she is being harassed by the circus manager. Elizabeth devises a plot with a boy from Ashbury, Saxon Walker, who Elizabeth has been running with (training for a marathon), and with whom she has romantic interest in. Together they "save" Celia and bring her home. It soon becomes apparent, when Celia returns to school, that Saxon has a crush on Celia, and that that is the reason he befriended Elizabeth - to get close to Celia. Saxon and Celia begin a relationship, much to Elizabeth's dismay. Elizabeth is incredibly hurt by both Saxon's actions, and Celia's apparent blindness to Elizabeth's feelings. Elizabeth notices that Celia does not seem like the same person anymore and that her and Saxon don't seem good for each other - they make a suicide pact that luckily, is unsuccessful. Elizabeth finds much needed comfort and friendship in Christina, who has been having serious problems of her own after she had sex with her boyfriend, Derek, and the condom broke. Things then get worse for Elizabeth when her dog, Lochie, is run over by a truck. Elizabeth is devastated by both Lochie's death and Celia and Saxon's insincere sympathy over it. Elizabeth then suddenly receives an anonymous letter from someone expressing sympathy for her loss. It is soon revealed by Christina, that the anonymous person is a boy from her school, Brookfield, and that he has a crush on her. Though Christina will not tell Elizabeth his name as he asks her not to.

Elizabeth then meets her step-brother, Ricky, who she soon discovers is in fact not her step-brother, but actually her half-brother. Her father got his second wife pregnant with Ricky, when Elizabeth's mother was three months pregnant with Elizabeth, and he never told the truth about it. Elizabeth is not particularly upset about it, but her mother is devastated and goes on a retreat to recover. During this time, Elizabeth decides to throw a sleepover party at her house with Celia and Christina and Maddie (Christina's cousin), and also takes the opportunity to invite the Anonymous Boy who had been writing her letters. Ricky comes to the party as well as, unbeknown to any of them, Ricky is dating Maddie. They all have a good time at the party, but it culminates in Celia, Saxon, Maddie and Ricky, going missing. Eventually they are discovered. They had decided that they wanted to go to New York and get away from everything but are prevented from doing so by their parents.

The novel ends with Elizabeth much happier with her life, despite the dramas that had recently happened. Her friendship with Christina (a much more healthy, equal friendship than the one she had with Celia), her success at the local running marathon, and her burgeoning relationship with Jared (Anonymous Boy), all give her a new-found confidence. She accepts that Celia will always be her friend, but that perhaps not her best friend, and that that is okay. The last page is Elizabeth writing a letter to one of the clubs that had been sending her letters and bringing her down, telling them that she never wants to hear from them again and if they write to her still, she won't open the letter, signifying the change in the way she sees herself.

== Awards ==
Feeling Sorry For Celia has won several awards, including:

- Winner in 2001 of the Ethel Turner prize
- A Children's Book Council of Australia Notable Book
- A BookSense 76 Pick
- An American Library Association Best Book for Young Adults
- A White Ravens selection

== Critical reception ==
The critical reception was generally favourable. Sally Murphy from Aussiereviews.com said, "Feeling Sorry For Celia is truly an outstanding piece of adolescent fiction." Lucy Burns from Teenreads.com, called it "thoroughly charming". The Sunday Telegraph in the United Kingdom also gave it a positive review, stating: "Altogether funnier, cleverer and more wide-ranging than others of its genre." The Sunday Age in Australia praised Moriarty, saying, "It's Moriarty's skilful use of humour that prevents Feeling Sorry for Celia from being just a bleak, angst-ridden tale about blackheads and oily hair. It is full of drama, grief, confusion, yearning, desire, and letters and Post-It-Notes…. A lot happens – some good things, quite a few sad – but the characters have a depth and complexity that make them credible portraits of today's teenagers."

== Companion books ==
Feeling Sorry for Celia has three companion books. They are not exactly sequels as the next three stories do not follow Elizabeth Clarry, though she is mentioned in all of them. All the companion novels centre around Ashbury and Brookfield. The first companion novel is Finding Cassie Crazy (The Year of Secret Assignments in the US). The second companion novel is The Betrayal of Bindy Mackenzie (The Murder of Bindy Mackenzie in the US, Becoming Bindy Mackenzie in the UK). Dreaming of Amelia (The Ghosts of Ashbury High in the US), the third companion novel, was released late 2009 in Australia, and 2010 elsewhere.
