= Ginia Bellafante =

American critic and columnist

- Born: March 31, 1965 (age 61); United States
- Occupations: journalism; television critic

Ginia Bellafante (born March 31, 1965) is an American critic and columnist for The New York Times.

== Career ==
Bellafante worked as a TV and cultural critic at Time until 1999. She then joined The New York Times as a fashion critic, and later worked as a television critic before joining the Metropolitan section covering New York City. In 2011, she began writing "Big City", "a weekly column dedicated to life, culture, politics and policy in New York City".

== Criticism ==
In 1998, Bellafante wrote a cover story for Time, "Is Feminism Dead?", claiming that young feminists care primarily about "their bodies" and "themselves". The story was critiqued by Erica Jong of The New York Observer, who said, "Time's idiotic cover story on feminism is, in short, a symptom of what's wrong, not an analysis." Janelle Brown of Salon called it "poorly thought-out".

Bellafante's New York Times review in 2011 of Game of Thrones was criticized by some as sexist for suggesting that only sexual content might motivate women to watch a complex fantasy story.

In April 2020, Bellafante came under fire for linking Fox News's and, in particular, Sean Hannity's, coverage of COVID-19 to a New York man's death. The man had contracted the virus while on a cruise, which he had decided to take after consuming media that had downplayed the threat of the virus. Some considered several parts of the story misleading; in particular, remarks by Hannity reported in the article were made after the cruise had already begun. Bellafante herself had also downplayed the virus two months earlier, saying she didn't understand why people weren't traveling to China.

== Personal ==
Bellafante is a native of Long Island, and lives in New York City with her husband and their son.
