= Perfect Nanny =

Perfect Nanny or The Perfect Nanny may refer to:

- The Perfect Nanny, an alternative title of the novel Lullaby by Leïla Slimani
  - Perfect Nanny (film), a 2019 French film based on the novel
  - The Perfect Nanny (TV series)
- "The Perfect Nanny" (song), a song from Walt Disney's 1964 film Mary Poppins
- The Perfect Nanny (film), a 2001 American television film
