= Nathan Ross (producer) =

American film and television producer

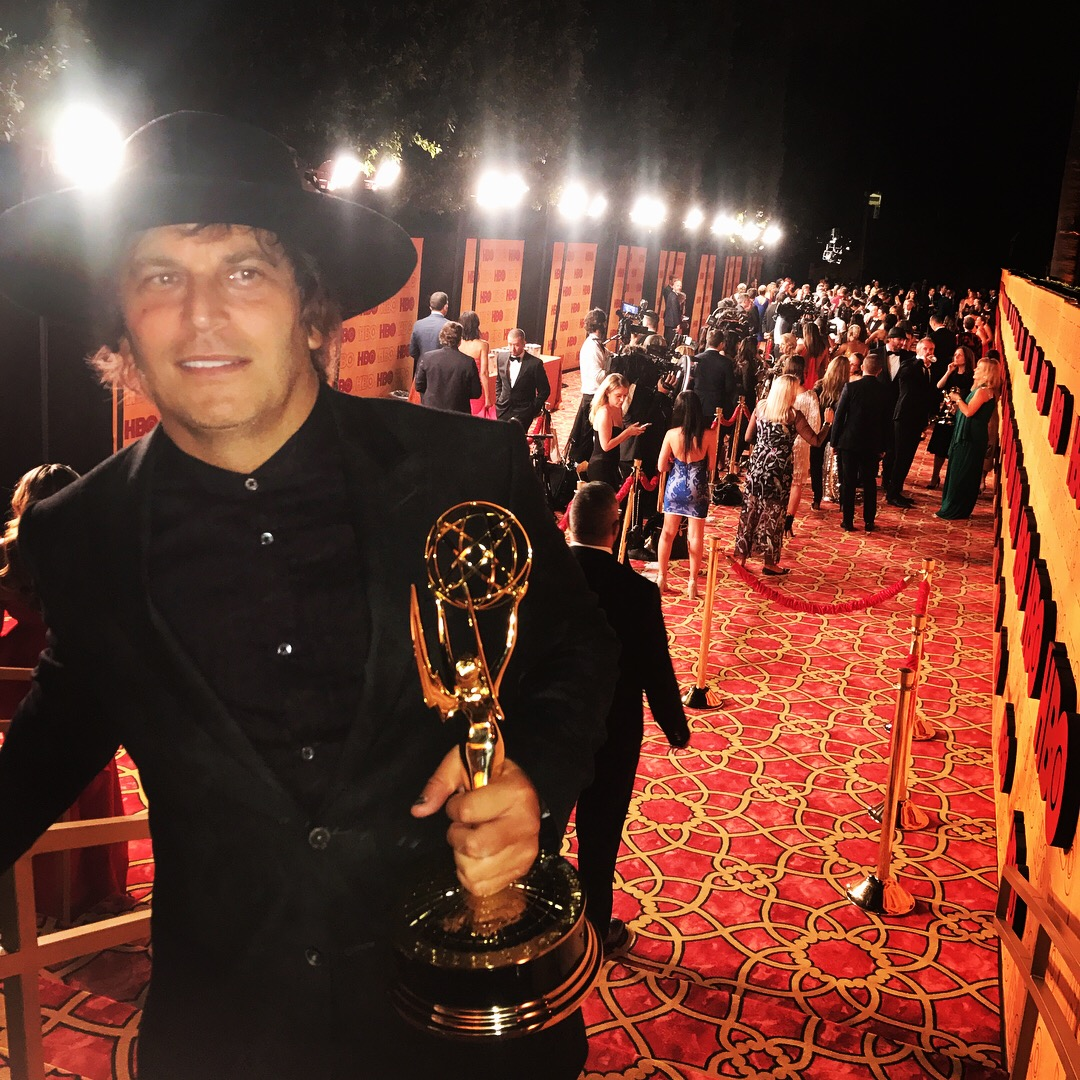
Ross at The 69th Annual Emmy Awards, 2017

Nathan Ross is an American film and television producer.

== Personal life ==
Ross grew up in Northbrook, Il and graduated from Glenbrook North High School. He is an Indiana University and University of Illinois Chicago - School of Law graduate.

Prior to becoming a producer, he was an agent at ICM Partners from 2003 to 2010, primarily representing directors and screenwriters for film.

He was profiled by The Hollywood Reporter in November 2008 in their "Next Gen 35 Under 35", which recognizes entertainment executives in their yearly issue.

Mr. Ross is on the board for the Palm Springs International Film Festival/Society.

== Film production ==
Ross was an executive producer on Dallas Buyers Club (starring Matthew McConaughey and Jared Leto, both of whom won Academy Awards for their performances) alongside his directing partner, Jean-Marc Vallée. It was released by Focus Features on November 1, 2013, and won three Academy Awards, and was nominated for six in total (including Best Picture).

He was also executive producer on Wild, directed by Vallée for Fox Searchlight, starring Reese Witherspoon and Laura Dern, both of whom were nominated for Academy Awards. The film was released on December 3, 2014.

Ross' most recent film release was Demolition, which Vallée also directed, and starred Jake Gyllenhaal, Naomi Watts, and Chris Cooper, for Fox Searchlight. It was released April 8, 2016 and won the "Headliners Audience Award" at the 2016 SXSW Film Festival.

Ross was developing the story of John Lennon and Yoko Ono for Universal Pictures. “Its the first time Yoko is allowing her story to be told,” and “We wanted to bring the right type of intimacy to the storytelling,” Ross told Rolling Stone in an interview for the August 2019 issue.

== Television ==
Ross was an executive producer on the HBO series, Big Little Lies, an adaptation of Liane Moriarty's 2014 darkly comic novel about three mothers of kindergartners, starring Nicole Kidman and Reese Witherspoon. The show premiered in February 2017. It won 8 Emmys at the 69th Annual Emmy Awards, including Outstanding Limited Series, with 16 overall nominations. At the 75th Annual Golden Globes, Big Little Lies won 4, including Best Limited Series or TV Movie, out of 6 nominations. The second season aired in 2018 with Meryl Streep added to the cast.

Ross is also an Executive Producer alongside Jean-Marc Vallee on an adaptation of Gillian Flynn's debut thriller novel Sharp Objects. The limited series stars Amy Adams, Patricia Clarkson, and Chris Messina.

Among its accolades, Clarkson won the Golden Globe Award for Best Supporting Actress – Series, Miniseries or Television Film and Adams received a nomination for the Golden Globe Award for Best Actress – Miniseries or Television Film. It also received eight nominations at the 71st Primetime Emmy Awards, including Outstanding Limited Series and acting nominations for Adams and Clarkson.

Ross executive produced The Lady In the Lake for Apple. The straight-to-series limited mystery stars Academy Award winner Natalie Portman and Emmy-nominated Moses Ingram, and is directed by Alma Har'el. The show was slated to release on Apple TV+ on July 19, 2024.

In 2025, Ross was an executive producer on Critical Incident: Death at the Border, an HBO documentary directed by Rick Rowley about Anastasio Hernández Rojas's death in U.S. custody at the San Diego–Tijuana border in 2010. It premiered on December 29, 2025. The film won Outstanding Investigative Documentary at the News & Documentary Emmy Awards, and was nominated for a Peabody Award in the Documentary category.

== Production Company ==
Ross is a co-founder of Crazyrose, a film and television production and financing company, founded with Jean-Marc Vallée in partnership with Bloom and Endeavor Content. In 2021, the company signed a first look deal with HBO and HBO Max.
