= The Hypnotist's Love Story =

2011 novel by Liane Moriarty

- First Australian edition
- Author: Liane Moriarty
- Published: 2011
- Publisher: Pan Macmillan (Aus); Berkley Books (US)
- Publication place: Australia
- Pages: 416
- ISBN: 9781742610603

The Hypnotist's Love Story is a 2011 novel by Australian author Liane Moriarty. It tells the story of Ellen O'Farrel, a hypnotherapist, who becomes involved with a widower who is being stalked by his ex-girlfriend Saskia, with whom he and his son Jake lived together for three years. The book is Moriarty's fourth novel.

== Reception ==
The novel received mostly positive reviews. About the novel, the Kirkus Reviews wrote "Amazingly, the effervescent comedy and troubling melodrama combine to create a satisfying beach read, escapist but not unintelligent."

== Television adaptation ==
In 2019 ABC ordered a pilot based on the novel, with Heather Graham set to star in the series and Katie Wech set to write.
