= Nine Perfect Strangers =

2018 novel by Liane Moriarty

- First edition (Australia)
- Author: Liane Moriarty
- Published: 18 September 2018
- Publisher: Pan Macmillan
- Publication place: Australia
- Pages: 464
- ISBN: 978-1-4328-5900-8

Nine Perfect Strangers is a 2018 novel by Australian author Liane Moriarty. It was published on 18 September 2018 by Macmillan Australia. It is a New York Times Bestseller.

== Synopsis ==
Frances Welty, a fifty-two-year-old romance novelist hurting from losing money to a romance scammer, the rejection of her latest novel, and a stinging critique of her work, checks into Tranquillium House, a wellness retreat in rural Australia. The "Mind and Body Total Transformation Retreat" is run by a mysterious Russian woman named Masha, assisted by Yao and Delilah. Frances meets the other guests: Tony, an ex-Australian rules football player; school teacher Napoleon Marconi and his midwife wife Heather, along with their daughter, Zoe; stay-at-home-mom Carmel Schneider; young married couple Ben and Jessica Chandler; and gay divorce attorney Lars Lee. Each guest is dealing with personal issues. Tony is divorced and estranged from his children and grandchildren. His dog just died, and when he had a recent health scare, he found himself hoping it was terminal. The Marconis are dealing with the suicide of their son, Zach. Napoleon blames himself for oversleeping that day, Heather blames herself for not realizing that a side effect of Zach's asthma medication was depression and suicidal thoughts, and his twin sister Zoe had realized Zach was acting out of sorts, but had been bickering with him and didn't ask if he was okay. Zach and Zoe's twenty-first birthday will occur during their retreat. Ben and Jessica had recently won $22 million in the lottery. Jessica has become addicted to plastic surgery, making her less attractive in the eyes of her husband. Ben has become obsessed with his new Lamborghini, but finds himself missing his days as a mechanic. Carmel's husband left her for another woman, and she's convinced she is overweight. Lars's partner wants to adopt a baby, which Lars is against.

The guests are somewhat shocked by Masha's strict rules: they are served smoothies, which they are required to drink, and they almost immediately have to observe a five-day 'Noble Silence' of no talking or interacting with others. Strangely, everyone does end up feeling refreshed and rejuvenated. Upon breaking the silence, Masha tells them they are about to embark on a new stage of healing. Heather, however, deduces that they Masha has been drugging their smoothies. Masha admits that she has been microdosing the guests with LSD and ecstasy, and that they've all just taken a much larger dose. This upsets everyone, especially Jessica, who claims she's pregnant. The guests spend the night hallucinating in a basement yoga studio under the care of Masha, Yao, and Delilah. When they wake up, however, the guests find they have been locked in the basement. Masha, who has also dosed herself, tells the guests to prepare for 'a dark night of the soul' and instructs them to advocate for an assigned guest, as they are all now on death row. Yao and Delilah realize Masha has suffered a psychotic break. Delilah steals Ben's car and vanishes. Yao is drugged by Masha when he tries to rescue the guests. Masha recalls how she had once been a corporate executive before suffering a near-fatal heart attack (Delilah had been her personal assistant and Yao had been on the medical team that revived her). She also remembers fleeing Soviet Russia with her husband, her struggles to fit into Australian culture, and the tragic accidental death of her infant son. The next day, Masha announces that she has set the building on fire. Smoke begins to pour through the basement door. Terrified they are going to die, Frances suggests they try the door one more time, and realize it has been unlocked for hours. The smoke was from newspapers burning in a waste basket.

Escaping from the basement, Masha attacks Heather with a letter opener, but Frances brains her with a candelabra. They are discovered by Jan, the retreat's masseuse, and her police officer boyfriend.

In the months and years to follow, everyone moves on with their lives. Masha goes to prison for a while, but her therapy becomes incredibly popular when she is released. Yao becomes a translator, marries his ex-fiancé, and becomes a father. Tony reunites with his children and grandchildren. Upon realizing that Jessica is not pregnant, the Chandlers divorce, with Lars arbitrating. Jessica becomes a full-time influencer while Ben returns to his job as a mechanic. The Marconis realize they'll never get over Zach's death, but learn to forgive themselves. Carmel returns to work and inadvertently becomes friends with her ex husband's new wife. Lars decides to become a father with his partner. Frances’s new, edgier book is a hit. She marries Tony on her sixtieth birthday.

== Characters ==
Tranquillum House staff:

- Masha Dmitrichenko, the Russian founder of the wellness resort called Tranquillum House
- Yao, one of Tranquillum House's dedicated employees
- Delilah, one of Tranquillum House's dedicated employees
- Jan, a massage therapist who works for Tranquillum House

The nine strangers:

1. Frances Welty, a novelist struggling with her professional and personal life
2. Tony Hogburn, a former Australian Football League player struggling with his addiction to food, TV and alcohol
3. Jessica Chandler, a wealthy lottery winner and social media influencer, married to Ben
4. Ben Chandler, a wealthy lottery winner, married to Jessica
5. Carmel Schneider, a single mother of four children whose husband left her and soon after started a relationship with a younger woman
6. Lars Lee, a divorce attorney
7. Napoleon Marconi, Heather's husband and Zoe's father, a high school teacher grieving the death of his son
8. Heather Marconi, Napoleon's wife and Zoe's mother, mourning the death of her son
9. Zoe Marconi, Napoleon and Heather's daughter, grieving the death of her twin brother

== Reception ==
The book received mixed reviews. Patty Rhule of USA Today gave the book two out of four stars, and said that it "does not match up to her captivating previous books." Specifically, she criticized the book for spending too many pages on character development. In contrast, Lisa Scottoline of the New York Times said that all the characters are "fully realized, with compelling lives, relationships and motivations" and that the novel is "thought-provoking, but never pedantic" as it "raises fascinating questions about our relentless quest for self-improvement."

== Awards ==
It was 2018 Goodreads Choice Awards Finalist: Best Fiction.

== Television adaptation ==
In January 2020, it was announced that the novel would be adapted into a television series, which premiered on Hulu in 2021. The series was co-written by David E. Kelley, John-Henry Butterworth, and Samantha Strauss and starred Nicole Kidman as Masha and Melissa McCarthy as Frances. On 27 May 2020, Manny Jacinto was cast in the role of Yao. The cast also includes Luke Evans as Lars, Melvin Gregg as Ben, Samara Weaving as Jessica, Asher Keddie as Heather, Grace Van Patten as Zoe, Tiffany Boone as Delilah, Michael Shannon as Napoleon, Regina Hall as Carmel, Hal Cumpston as Zachary and Bobby Cannavale as Tony. The series was directed by Jonathan Levine. Filming began in August 2020, in Byron Bay, Australia.
