= Truly Madly Guilty =

2016 novel by Australian author Liane Moriarty

- First edition (US)
- Author: Liane Moriarty
- Language: English
- Publisher: Flatiron Books (US); Michael Joseph (UK)
- Publication date: 2016
- Publication place: Australia
- Pages: 432
- ISBN: 9781925481396

Truly Madly Guilty is a 2016 novel by Australian author Liane Moriarty. It follows a couple whose lives are tossed into chaos when they attend a neighborhood barbecue. The book was published in July 2016 by Flatiron Books.

Just weeks after the novel's release, it was announced that Reese Witherspoon and Nicole Kidman had optioned for the novel's film rights.

== Synopsis ==
The novel tells the story of Sam and Clementine, an ordinary yet busy married couple trying to balance work and family life. After the couple is invited by Clementine's old friend Erika to a neighbor's barbecue party, a spiral of intrigue, lust, and betrayal is unleashed.

== Release ==
Truly Madly Guilty was first published in hardcover and e-book formats in Australia on 26 July 2016 by Flatiron Books. An audiobook adaptation was released simultaneously through Macmillan Audio and was narrated by Caroline Lee.

== Reception ==
Janet Maslin reviewed the book for The New York Times, criticizing it as formulaic and stating that "it’s a shame to see her resort to the level of contrivance that this book requires. You’d have to be a very dedicated Moriarty fan to believe much of anything that happens post-crisis."

== Television adaptation ==
In August 2016, it was reported that Reese Witherspoon and Nicole Kidman were teaming up again to adapt Liane Moriarty's latest novel, Truly Madly Guilty. The production companies for the adaptation would be Bruna Papandrea and Reese Witherspoon's Pacific Standard together with Nicole Kidman and Per Saari's Blossom Films. At the time, it was uncertain if Witherspoon and Kidman would take on acting roles, and there was also ambiguity about whether the project would be developed as a movie or a limited series. In May 2019, Kidman confirmed that HBO would be the network for the series.

== Awards ==
- 2016: Goodreads Choice Awards, Best Fiction.
