= The Betrayal of Bindy Mackenzie =

2006 novel by Jaclyn Moriarty

The Betrayal of Bindy MacKenzie
- First edition
- Author: Jaclyn Moriarty
- Language: English
- Genre: Novel
- Publisher: Pan Macmillan Publishers Australia Pty Limited
- Publication date: 2006
- Publication place: Australia
- Media type: Print (Hardback & Paperback)
- Pages: 494 pp
- Preceded by: Finding Cassie Crazy
- Followed by: Dreaming of Amelia

The Betrayal of Bindy Mackenzie, (also The Murder of Bindy MacKenzie in the US and Becoming Bindy MacKenzie in the UK) is a 2006 novel for young adults by Jaclyn Moriarty. It is the third of a series set in the north-western suburbs of Sydney, where the author grew up. The story focuses on a minor character from Moriarty's second young adult novel, Finding Cassie Crazy. The story is told through letters, memos and transcripts, similar to the structure of other novels by the author.

== Plot summary ==
The novel follows Bindy Mackenzie, a Year 11 student at Ashbury High in Sydney. She is a perfectionist and focussing obsessively on her studies. When Bindy begins Year 11, she is disgusted to discover that she must take part in FAD, a mandatory course aimed at helping teenagers deal with the issues that face them.

Her teacher, Try Montaine, an American English teacher, takes a strong interest in each of the members of Bindy's FAD group. The FAD course presents Bindy with a rather shocking scenario – she discovers that she is widely disliked by most of her peers, due to her arrogant and precocious attitude. Bindy begins a mission to seek revenge on her classmates, Bindy also falls ill from a strange illness that only contributes to these problems.

Bindy slowly realises the error of her ways and tries to make amends with her FAD group, Her better attitude helping her peers to gradually learn to enjoy Bindy's company as she changes as a person. In the meantime, Finnegan Blonde, Bindy's partner from her FAD group, presents a possible love interest for Bindy as one of the first people to recognise her as friendly.

== Characters ==
- Bindy Mackenzie, the protagonist, is an over-achieving perfectionist who cares a great deal about her studies. Bindy is extremely intelligent, topping all of her classes. Bindy lives with her aunt and uncle and their daughter, Bella, while her parents are renovating a property in the city. Bindy's arrogant and smug attitude causes her to be disliked by her classmates, though she mistakenly believes she is popular and idolised due to her academic abilities. Bindy is constantly working: she studies relentlessly and has three jobs and piano lessons, leaving her almost no spare time whatsoever. She keeps careful transcripts of everything said around her.
- Try Montaine is the leader of Bindy's FAD group. She is extremely short, and slightly erratic. Try often forgets the students' names. Try takes her leadership role very seriously, even inviting the group to her house for a FAD session. Try is supportive of Bindy, but encourages her to try to be friendlier to her peers.
- Emily Thompson is a member of Bindy's FAD group. Emily was a main character in Moriarty's previous novel Finding Cassie Crazy. Emily is loud and outgoing, perceived by Bindy as a clueless airhead. Emily is passionate and very emotional.
- Elizabeth Clarry is a member of Bindy's FAD group. She is recognised by Bindy for her athletic ability. Bindy seems to respect Elizabeth originally far more than her other peers. Elizabeth was the main character in Feeling Sorry for Celia.
- Finnegan Blonde is a new student at Ashbury High and a member of Bindy's FAD group. He is mysterious and somewhat secretive, though he is rather friendlier to Bindy than his peers.
- Toby Mazzerati is an outgoing, spirited member of Bindy's FAD group. He and Bindy were close friends many years previous. Toby has a talent for woodwork.
- Briony Atkins is a member of Bindy's FAD group. She very rarely speaks, and when she does, it is only very briefly. Briony is kind-hearted but very shy.
- Astrid Bexonville is a member of Bindy's FAD group. She is loud and popular. Astrid and Emily have a strong friendship, particularly within their group sessions. Bindy despises Astrid due to their strikingly contrasting personalities.
- Sergio Saba is a member of Bindy's FAD group. He is known for his enigmatic nature, and the large burn scar on his cheek. Sergio is friendly with Astrid and Emily within the FAD group.
- Anthony Mackenzie is Bindy's beloved brother.

== Critical reception ==
The Betrayal of Bindy Mackenzie received favourable reviews. Frances Atkinson at The Age called it "satisfying and engaging", complimenting Moriarty's "convincing and often funny" dialogue. Australian Bookseller & Publisher said it was "the perfect young adult novel".
