= Jaclyn Moriarty =

Australian novelist (born 1968)

- Occupation: Novelist
- Writing career
- Notable awards: New South Wales Premier's Literary Awards – Ethel Turner Prize for Young People's Literature (3); Davitt Award; Queensland Literary Awards – Children's Book Award; Indie Book Awards Book of the Year – Children's

Jaclyn Moriarty is an Australian novelist, most known for her young adult literature. She is a recipient of the Davitt Award and the Aurealis Award for Best Children's Fiction.

== Early life and education ==
Jaclyn Moriarty was raised in the north-west suburbs of Sydney. She has four sisters and one brother. Two of her sisters, Liane and Nicola, are also novelists.

Moriarty studied English and law at the University of Sydney upon graduating from high school. She then earned a Masters in Law at Yale University and a PhD at Gonville and Caius College, Cambridge.

== Career ==
Moriarty worked as an entertainment and media lawyer for four years before becoming a full-time writer. The literary agent who picked up her first book, Feeling Sorry for Celia, was Australian author Garth Nix.

== Works ==
=== The Ashbury/Brookfield series ===
The Ashbury/Brookfield Series is four novels that are not sequels but are linked. They all revolve around various students that attend the exclusive private school, Ashbury High, or the local comprehensive, Brookfield High. Many of the students cross over into more than one novel, but each novel is different and tells a different story. All novels are told through the various character's own writing (through letters, emails, exam papers, etc.).

The Ashbury/Brookfield series of novels are (in chronological order):

- Feeling Sorry for Celia (2000)
- Finding Cassie Crazy (2003) (AUS/UK title) The Year of Secret Assignments (US title)
- The Betrayal of Bindy Mackenzie (2006) (AUS title) also published as Becoming Bindy Mackenzie (UK title), and The Murder of Bindy Mackenzie (US title)
- Dreaming of Amelia (2009) (AUS/UK title) also published as The Ghosts of Ashbury High (US title)

=== The Colours of Madeleine trilogy ===
This trilogy retains some familiar features of Moriarty's style, such as a loosely epistolary form (the use of alternating chapters in which characters speak in their own quite distinctive voices). But it also marks a departure in the direction of fantasy: the premise of the trilogy is, or at least appears to be, the existence of an almost fairyland-like parallel world, sealed off from our world but in connection with it via 'cracks,' through which letters, or even people, can travel.

- A Corner of White, Sydney Pan Macmillan (published 2012), 2013, ISBN 978-1-74261-139-6
- The Cracks in the Kingdom, Sydney, New South Wales Pan Australia, 2014, ISBN 978-1-74261-287-4. Winner: Ethel Turner Prize for Young People's Literature, New South Wales Premier's Literary Awards 2015.
- A Tangle of Gold, Sydney Pan, 2016, ISBN 978-1-74353-323-9

=== Kingdoms & Empires series ===
- The Extremely Inconvenient Adventures of Bronte Mettlestone (2017)
- The Slightly Alarming Tale of the Whispering Wars (2018) ISBN 9781760297183 – winner of the 2019 Griffith University Children's Book Award at the Queensland Literary Awards
- The Stolen Prince of Cloudburst (2020) ISBN 9781760875060 – shortlisted for 2021 Children's Book of the Year Award: Younger Readers and for the 2021 Children's Book Award at the Queensland Literary Awards
- The Astonishing Chronicles of Oscar from Elsewhere (2021) ISBN 9781760526368
- The Impossible Secret of Lillian Velvet (2023) – winner of the 2024 Children's Indie Book Award and shortlisted for the 2024 Griffith University Children's Book Award, Queensland Literary Awards

=== Other novels ===
- I Have a Bed Made of Buttermilk Pancakes (2004)
- The Spell Book of Listen Taylor (2007) a young adult novel that is an adaptation of I Have a Bed Made of Buttermilk Pancakes.
- Gravity is the Thing (2019) ISBN 9781760559502
- Time Travel for Beginners (2026) ISBN 9780593820339

== Awards ==
- 2001 New South Wales Premier's Literary Awards – Ethel Turner Prize for Young People's Literature, winner for Feeling Sorry for Celia
- 2007 Davitt Award, winner for The Betrayal of Bindy Mackenzie
- 2013 New South Wales Premier's Literary Awards – Ethel Turner Prize for Young People's Literature, winner for A Corner of White
- 2015 New South Wales Premier's Literary Awards – Ethel Turner Prize for Young People's Literature, winner for The Cracks in the Kingdom
- 2018 Aurealis Award for Best Children's Fiction, shortlisted for The Extremely Inconvenient Adventures of Bronte Mettlestone
- 2019 Aurealis Award for Best Children's Fiction, shortlisted for The Slightly Alarming Tales of the Whispering Wars
- 2019 Queensland Literary Awards – Children's Book Award, winner for The Slightly Alarming Tale of the Whispering Wars
- 2021 Prime Minister's Literary Awards – Children's fiction, shortlisted for The Stolen Prince of Cloudburst
- 2024 Indie Book Awards Book of the Year – Children's, winner for The Impossible Secret of Lillian Velvet
