= Ivy George =

American child actress

Ivy George (born May 16, 2007) is an American actress. She began her career as a child actress in the film Paranormal Activity: The Ghost Dimension (2015) and the HBO series Big Little Lies (2017–2019).

== Career ==
George's first professional acting job came at six years old in a scene opposite Robin Williams. She then went on to guest star in other TV Series including Kirby Buckets, and Agent Carter. She then appeared in Girl Meets World and Big Little Lies. George has also appeared in quite a few films including Paranormal Activity: The Ghost Dimension, and Brimstone.

In 2016, George was nominated at the 37th Young Artist Awards for the film Paranormal Activity: The Ghost Dimension.

== Filmography ==
=== Film ===
Year	Title	Role	Notes	Ref(s)
2015	Paranormal Activity: The Ghost Dimension	Leila Fleege		
2015	Krampus	Perchta the Cherub	Voice role	
2016	13 Hours: The Secret Soldiers of Benghazi	Emily Silva		
2016	The Veil	Little Sarah		
2016	Brimstone	Sam		
2017	Literally Right Before Aaron	Flower Girl		
2019	Killer Therapy	Young Aubrey		
2020	Mr. Thisforthat	Sarah	Short film	
2021	Unknown Dimension: The Story of Paranormal Activity	Herself	Documentary film	
2021	Highway One	Dori		
TBA	Hope	Chloe		

=== Television ===
Year	Title	Role	Notes	Ref(s)
2014	The Crazy Ones	Little Girl	Episode: "The Monster"	
2014	About a Boy	Little Girl	Episode: "About a Boy's Dad"	
2014	Sam & Cat	Tawny	Episode: "#WeStealARockStar"	
2015	Kirby Buckets	Meaghan	Episode: "War and Pizza"	
2016	Agent Carter	Young Agnes Cully	Episode: "Smoke & Mirrors"	
2016	Girl Meets World	Young Maya	Episodes: "Girl Meets the Bay Window", "Girl Meets Bear", "Girl Meets World: Of Terror 3"	
2016	Better Things	Morgan	Episode: "Duke's Chorus"	
2017–2019	Big Little Lies	Amabella Klein	12 episodes	
2017	Twin Peaks	5-Year-Old Girl	Episode: "Part 7"	
2017	Tangled: The Series	Young Rapunzel (voice)	Episode: "Pascal's Story"	
2023	Fatal Attraction	Young Alex	Episode: "Best Friends"	
2025	The Pitt	Alana Dunn	Episode: "12:00 P.M." and "1:00 P.M."	
