= Pretty Things (novel) =

2020 novel by Janelle Brown

- Author: Janelle Brown
- Publisher: Random House
- Publication date: April 21, 2020
- ISBN: 978-0-525-47912-3

Pretty Things is a 2020 suspense novel by American writer Janelle Brown.

== Synopsis ==
The novels follows two brilliant yet emotionally scarred women, Nina and Vanessa, as they navigate a perilous game of deception and devastation. When a hesitant con artist forms an unlikely bond with a wealthy "influencer" at Lake Tahoe, her elaborate scheme transforms into a gritty and hazardous pursuit of long-awaited retribution.

== Reception ==
Pretty Things received reviews from Library Journal, Booklist, Kirkus Reviews, and Publishers Weekly.

== Adaptations ==
In April 2020, it was reported that a television series adaptation of novel series is in development from Blossom Films, a production company owned by Nicole Kidman and Per Saari, for Amazon after securing the rights in a fiercely competitive bidding war with multiple contenders. Nicole Kidman is slated to star and produce, with Reed Morano attached to direct and executive produce. Janelle Brown will adapt her novel and also serve as an executive producer for the show.
