= Finding Cassie Crazy =

2003 book by Jaclyn Moriarty

Finding Cassie Crazy, or, The Year of Secret Assignments
- First edition
- Author: Jaclyn Moriarty
- Language: English
- Genre: Novel
- Publisher: Pan Macmillan
- Publication date: 2003
- Publication place: Australia
- Media type: Print (Hardback & Paperback) & Audio book
- Pages: 340
- ISBN: 0-330-36438-3 (first edition, paperback)
- Preceded by: Feeling Sorry for Celia
- Followed by: The Betrayal of Bindy Mackenzie

Finding Cassie Crazy (titled The Year of Secret Assignments outside of Australia and the UK) is a novel by Jaclyn Moriarty. It was first published 2003 in Australia. The novel is both a stand-alone and also the second book of the Ashbury/Brookfield series.

== Plot ==
The novel follows the correspondence between students from two rival schools. Cassie Aganovic, Emily Thompson and Lydia Jaackson-Oberman, attend the prestigious, private Ashbury High; Matthew Dunlop, Charlie Taylor, and Sebastian Mantegna ("Seb") attend the public and notoriously rough, Brookfield High. In a special pen-pal program between the schools (previously seen in Feeling Sorry for Celia and set up by Mr. Botherit), Cassie begins to write to Matthew; Emily writes to Charlie; and Lydia exchanges letters with Seb. The letters are initially different degrees of hostile. Emily and Charlie poke fun at each other's writing, while Lydia and Seb bicker about whether or not they can trust each other. Matthew however, is much worse. He continuously threatens Cassie (i.e. "I'll break your fingers one by one"), but she responds calmly and tells no one of the abusive letters. Over time, the letters change tones. Charlie and Emily go on "practice dates" to help Charlie date the girl of his dreams, Christina Kratovac (who was the Brookfielder Elizabeth Clarry wrote to in Feeling Sorry For Celia). Lydia and Seb participate in "Secret Assignments" that eventually lead to their forming a close relationship. Cassie and Matthew begin to go down a similar path and plan a meeting after Cassie finally starts getting civil responses from Matthew. However, his sudden kindness is a ploy. He stands her up and then, on a following meeting, proceeds to rip up a letter that she had sent and openly mock her. This is especially hard for Cassie, because her father had recently died of cancer and Cassie had not yet come to terms with his death. This is why she never reported Matthew's initial abusive letters, she had not been feeling like herself and had lost her confidence.

When Lydia and Emily find out what Matthew has done, they ask for help from Seb and Charlie to get Matthew back. They soon discover that Matthew is not a real person. They are forced to hatch numerous plots to find who Matthew really is, or if he even exists. By the clever use of glitter in a letter, they discover that Matthew Dunlop's true identity is Paul Wilson, the form captain and star of the school drama club. He is also, coincidentally, the boyfriend of the girl Charlie likes, Christina. The five (Emily, Charlie, Lydia, Seb and an initially reluctant Cassie) work together for revenge. Seb beats Paul up after Paul humorously tells him the story of his deception. Seb is set to be going to an art show the very next morning, and Paul threatens to tell the principal in an attempt to penalize Seb. But just when this is about to happen, Lydia, Emily and Cassie pretend to be casting agents and call Paul, telling him he has a job and needs to come to a certain time and location to get his makeup done (Paul is an aspiring actor) and practice lines for a last-minute filming rehearsal. The girls' prank is successfully pulled off and Paul realizes at the end that it was all an elaborate plan to stop him from telling the school principal. During all this time Emily and Charlie seem to show signs that they like each other. Meanwhile, Lydia and Sebastian kiss on a secret assignment.

A small amount of time goes by before Brookfield is attacked (spray painted and the like). During this time Charlie and Emily get into a fight about a prank that had been pulled off earlier in the year that had disastrous consequences for Charlie and was caused by Emily; Seb and Lydia also argue, this time about a Secret Assignment that involved discovering each other first at a cafe without knowing what the other looked like (an Assignment which Seb cheated on). There are cruel sayings (e.g. "Brooker Bites") spray-painted on the walls of Brookfield High, each phrase followed by the Ashbury crest. Reasonably, the Brookfielders retaliate. For a time, acts of vandalism are perpetrated between the schools, until a Brookfield student — whom the staff keep anonymous — incorrectly pinpoints Cassie, Emily, and Lydia as the instigators of the first attack. When told by their form mistress, Mrs. Lilydale, that diaries, letters, etc. are going to be read for clues, the girls are angered. In coordination with Cassie's mother (who is a lawyer), Mrs. Lilydale arranges a trial so that the girls can prove that this would be an unjust invasion of their privacy. Emily, fascinated by law, is appointed to represent the students in a Brookfield-Ashbury co-trial. Principals and school officials from the respective schools are all present at the trial.

When the time for the trial comes, only Emily and Lydia are present at first. Emily turns the tables on the staff and proves that she, along with her classmates, has a right to privacy, and the administration agrees not to read their letters. Cassie then bursts in during the middle of the trial, with Seb and Charlie behind her. They are carrying evidence of the vandalism, such as the paint used to write "Brooker Bites" on the wall and the grapeseed oil that is used to smear the science laboratory floors. When questioned by Emily, Charlie reveals that the items came from the bedroom closet of none other than Paul Wilson. Paul attempts to fight back but his guilt is clear and he has no logical explanation for Charlie, Seb and Cassie's discovery. He runs out the door in tears and all charges are dropped against the Ashbury students as the Brookfield attacks were "inside jobs."

The story ends happily as the year wraps up with the makeup of Charlie and Emily, and Seb and Lydia. Seb and Lydia decide to begin officially dating and Charlie and Emily show signs that they are heading in the same direction. An art show is put on by the students of both schools. Lydia, an aspiring author, and Seb, a talented artist, contribute a children's book and Cassie uses words from a fake, but sweet, letter from "Matthew" as the lyrics to a song she writes and sings. This is important to her because before her father died of cancer he told her that he thought he'd gotten sick because of the nervousness and fear he'd experienced his whole life, and had let built up. Cassie, hearing this, had promised her father "not to be scared." Singing in public is scary for her, so she decides to face her fear with her friend's support. She is able to accept her father's death.

== Characters ==
Cassandra "Cassie" Aganovic: A shy, vulnerable girl whose father recently died of cancer. She rarely opens up, even to her best friends. She's very musical and sings like an "angel in disguise". Although she seems meek, she may actually be the bravest of the three. She also has a talent for locks and can reach a full octave on a piano. She is athletic and has a sprinter's body. Her pen friend is Matthew Dunlop/Paul Wilson.

Emily Melissa-Anne Thompson: A talkative chocoholic who aspires to be a lawyer like her parents. She misuses words in a comical way. She is slightly idealistic, always wanting things to be "fair" and for wrongs to be righted. Emily is strong and stands up for her beliefs although she can be very stubborn. Her pen friend is Charlie Taylor.

Lydia Jaackson-Oberman: The daredevil of the group and an aspiring author. She seems fearless, but she actually has more insecurities than both the other girls. She spins tales because she is afraid of reality sometimes. Her stories often end with all of the characters dying in violent manners. Lydia is also afraid that somebody will judge her only by her looks and not her "real self". She is also intensely clever, with little effort. Her pen friend is Seb Mantegna.

Charles "Charlie" Taylor: A sweet, endearing guy. He is from a big family and is the youngest boy. He is a sometimes-car-thief, and has taken a teacher's car out for a joyride (though he isn't really 'stealing' the cars because he tunes them up before returning them). Because of this, he is attractive to girls at Brookfield, but he is oblivious to this. Charlie believes that he is impaired when it comes to "dating with girls." Charlie claims he has a supersonic memory, of which he is proud. Charlie writes to Emily Thompson.

"Matthew Dunlop": A cruel and vindictive young man, who is actually Paul Wilson. He pretends to be Matthew to cover his cruelty and avoid the consequences of his treatment of Cassie. He is the boyfriend of Christina Kratovac (who was a major character in the first Ashbury/Brookfield novel) at the beginning of the novel but they later break up. Matthew/Paul writes to Cassie Aganovic.

Sebastian "Seb" Mantegna: An excellent artist with a major soccer obsession. He is described as "dark and sexy." Seb has a black belt in Tae Kwon Do, and a problem controlling his anger. He has beaten up people who "deserve it." He has almost been expelled several times; Seb also beats up Paul Wilson/Matthew Dunlop after his cruelty to Cassie. He writes to Lydia Jaackson-Oberman.

== Awards and nominations ==
- American Library Association Best Books for Young Adults
- Horn Book Magazine Fanfare Book
- Booklist Editor's Choice
- Books for Youth (Awards)
- Amazon Editor's Choice
- Virginia Young Readers Award Nominee
- IRA 2006 Young Adults' Choice

== Critical reception ==
Finding Cassie Crazy has received mainly positive reviews. “This energetic novel reveals the author's keen understanding of teen dynamics," says Publishers Weekly. Well-known Australian author of young adult literature, John Marsden, said in The Age, "A bravura performance . . . Finding Cassie Crazy is the funniest book I've read in year." "Who can resist Moriarty’s biting humor?" Kirkus Reviews said of Moriarty's writing. Furthermore, the novel is "all in all lively and entertaining story," according to Horn Book Magazine. The reviewer added, "Moriarty's story will likely satisfy hearty appetites for suspense and fun," adding that it has "universal appeal."

== Companion novels ==
Finding Cassie Crazy has three companion books. Chronologically, Finding Cassie Crazy is the second novel in the Ashbury/Brookfield Series. The books are not exactly sequels as the other three stories do not follow Lydia, Emily and Cassie, though Emily is a secondary character in the third novel of the series, The Betrayal of Bindy Mackenzie ("The Murder of Bindy Mackenzie" (US), "Becoming Bindy Mackenzie" (UK)), and both Emily and Lydia are main characters in the fourth novel of the series, Dreaming of Amelia (released late 2009 in Australia, and is set be released in other countries soon).

The first novel in the series is Feeling Sorry for Celia.
