= Brittany Shaw =

American actress

- Born: May 20, 1988 (age 38); Memphis, Tennessee, United States
- Occupation: Actress
- Years active: 2005–present

Brittany Shaw is an American actress. She is best known for playing Emily, the lead character in the horror film Paranormal Activity: The Ghost Dimension.

== Early life ==
Shaw was born in Memphis, Tennessee. She realised her love for acting at the age of 4 watching a play program pretending she was a pumpkin. She got her first Hollywood agent by writing a short film which was shown at the LA Film Festival.

== Career ==
Shaw's first big and recurring role was playing Olivia Wentworth in the musical drama Nashville. Her character had a well known kiss scene with Juliette Barnes played by Hayden Panettiere Her first big role came playing Emily in the horror film Paranormal Activity: The Ghost Dimension. Shaw was no fan of horror films prior to appearing in the film, mentioning that she had her hand over her face watching the first Paranormal Activity. However starring in the film has now made her a fan She starred in and also produced her first feature length film, Peace in the Valley in 2022 .

== Filmography ==
=== Film ===
| Year | Title | Role | Notes |
|---|---|---|---|
| 2005 | Walk the Line | Etta Grant | |
| 2007 | Live! | Tank Top Student | |
| 2009 | The Best Sex | Young April | |
| 2009 | It's Not Me, It's You | Samantha | Short |
| 2010 | Clemency | Melody Norton | Short |
| 2015 | Happiest Birthday | Ilana | Short |
| 2015 | Paranormal Activity: The Ghost Dimension | Emily | |
| 2016 | Dead Drew | Gracie | |
| 2017 | A Moving Romance | Heather | |
| 2017 | The Shadow Effect | Brinn Howorth | Short |
| 2017 | Happiest Birthday | Vanessa Rose | Short |
| 2018 | Between Worlds | Lettie | |
| 2018 | Crocodile Smile | Young Woman | |
| 2022 | Peace in the Valley | Ashley | |

=== Television ===
| Year | Title | Role | Notes |
|---|---|---|---|
| 2005 | Seeing Stars | Various | Episode; Hollywood Boulevard |
| 2007 | General Hospital | Woman | Episode; #1.11303 |
| 2007 | Monk | Salesgirl | Episode; Mr. Monk and the Man Who Shot Santa Claus |
| 2006-2010 | Entourage | Dana's Assistant | 2 episodes |
| 2011 | State of Georgia | Kelly Webster | Episode; The Popular Chicks |
| 2012 | Body of Proof | Mindy Harrison | Episode; Occupational Hazards |
| 2013 | CSI: Crime Scene Investigation | Claudia Weber | Episode; Double Fault |
| 2013 | The Glades | Jessica Shelley | Episode; Apocalypse Now |
| 2013 | Masters of Sex | Colleen | Episode; Love and Marriage |
| 2013 | Nashville | Olivia Wentworth | 4 episodes |
| 2014 | NCIS | Allison | Episode; Crescent City (Part II) |
| 2014 | Royal Pains | Tracy | Episode; All in the Family |
| 2017 | Bones | Jeannine Kovac | 3 episodes |
