= The Shadow Effect =

- Directed by: Obin Olson; Amariah Olson
- Screenplay by: Anthony Feole; George Abbott Clark
- Story by: Chad Law; Evan Law
- Produced by: Larry Olson; Obin Olson; Timothy Woodward Jr.; Amariah Olson
- Starring: Cam Gigandet; Jonathan Rhys Meyers; Brit Shaw; Michael Biehn
- Music by: Denis Surov
- Distributed by: Momentum Pictures
- Release date: May 2, 2017 (United States)
- Running time: 94 minutes
- Country: United States
- Language: English

The Shadow Effect is a 2017 American action thriller film directed by Obin Olson and Amariah Olson, starring Cam Gigandet, Jonathan Rhys Meyers and Michael Biehn. The film was released by Momentum Pictures on Demand, Digital HD and DVD on May 2, 2017.

== Plot ==
A US senator is assassinated and his guards are killed by an assassin. He then blows up himself and some other guards with a grenade. Gabriel wakes up with nightmares every day. His wife Brinn comforts him. They run a restaurant together, and are good friends with Sheriff Hodge. Gabe has memories of the Senator's assassination. One day, Gabe hears music and has a seizure. Later, a politician and his wife are in a boat. Gabe disguises himself like the assassin to fight the politician and falls off the boat. Gabe kills him, then blows himself up. He wakes up in his home to memories of the assassination.

Brinn takes him to a Doctor Reese (Rhys Meyers), who gives him some medication. Gabe later hears the same music. He becomes like a robot. A man gives him a list with the name of a target. Gabe goes to the target at a subway and pushes him in front of a train, causing a cop to chase him. Gabe kills the cop then blows himself up, then he wakes up with this memory. He goes to the location where the cop died to find a finger exactly as same as his own. Hodge appears and kills him. Gabe wakes up. He doesn't take the doctor's medication. He hears the same music but gets control. The Man gives Gabe another list, and he pretends to follow the instructions. Gabe goes to the target but instead kills Hodge's men who traced him. Hodge chases Gabe, but he escapes.

He confronts the doctor, and Hodge arrives there too. Gabe drives home to realize that Brinn is in on it too: she is not his wife but fell in love with him. Hodge appears and kills him. Gabe wakes up in a hospital room being checked up by a doctor. He kills the doctor and a guard and confronts Reese. Reese's wife had died, and he built a program to recreate human clones. Gabe was their perfect killing machine, but somehow, each new Gabe recovers memories of the previous ones. Gabe is revealed to be a clone of a deceased Special Forces soldier; Hodge was his commander. Hodge appears with some men. Reese escapes, and Gabe gets injured. Brinn arrives to help Gabe, and they kill Hodge's men. Gabe is about to die, but Brinn breaks out a new body of Gabe. As Gabe dies, the new Gabe awakes. Hodge uses the music to control Gabe but he gets control and kills Hodge. The place is about to explode, and he gets Brinn in an elevator and sacrifices himself to get the elevator up. Reese meets with the Man to discuss the closing of the project. A few days later, Gabe wakes up to the music again in a new apartment.

== Cast ==
- Cam Gigandet as Gabriel Howarth
- Jonathan Rhys Meyers as Dr. Reese
- Brittany Shaw as Brin Howarth
- Michael Biehn as Sheriff Hodge

== Filming ==
The film was shot in Atlanta, Georgia.
