= What Alice Forgot =

2009 novel by Liane Moriarty

- Author: Liane Moriarty
- Published: 1 May 2009
- Publication place: Australia
- Pages: 544
- ISBN: 978-0-399-15718-9

What Alice Forgot is a 2009 novel by Australian author Liane Moriarty. It tells the story of a 39-year-old mother of three who loses her memory of the last ten years of her life. The book is Moriarty's third novel.

== Synopsis ==
Alice wakes up believing she is a 29-year-old happily-married newlywed expecting her first child. She soon discovers that she is a 39-year-old soon to be divorced mother of three, estranged from her husband, best friend, and sister. She must deal with the amnesia that caused her to forget the last ten years of her life and discover what she has forgotten.

== Reception ==
The novel received mostly positive reviews. Publishers Weekly described it as "moving, well-paced, and thoroughly pleasurable."

== Possible film adaptation ==
The film rights to the novel were acquired by TriStar in July 2014. Entertainment Weekly reported in 2017 that director David Frankel was positioned to direct the film.
