= Paranormal Activity: The Ghost Dimension =

2015 film by Gregory Plotkin

- Theatrical release poster
- Directed by: Gregory Plotkin
- Screenplay by: Jason Harry Pagan; Andrew Deutschman; Adam Robitel; Gavin Heffernan
- Story by: Brantley Aufill; Jason Harry Pagan; Andrew Deutschman
- Based on: Paranormal Activity by Oren Peli
- Produced by: Jason Blum; Oren Peli
- Starring: Chris J. Murray; Brittany Shaw; Olivia Taylor Dudley; Dan Gill; Ivy George; Jessica Tyler Brown; Chloe Csengery; Don McManus; Hallie Foote
- Cinematography: John Rutland
- Edited by: Michel Aller
- Production companies: Blumhouse Productions; Solana Films; Room 101, Inc.
- Distributed by: Paramount Pictures
- Release date: October 23, 2015
- Running time: 88 minutes
- Country: United States
- Language: English
- Budget: $10 million
- Box office: $78.9 million

Paranormal Activity: The Ghost Dimension is a 2015 American 3D found footage supernatural horror film directed by Gregory Plotkin in his directorial debut, and written by Jason Harry Pagan, Andrew Deutschman, Adam Robitel and Gavin Heffernan. It is the sixth installment in the Paranormal Activity series. Most of the film takes place after Paranormal Activity 4 (2012), though the plot ties in heavily with the events of Paranormal Activity 3 (2011). It is the first installment not to star Katie Featherston as Katie, although she appears played by Chloe Csengery, who had already portrayed a younger Katie in the last two installments.

Set in 2013 in Santa Rosa, California, the film follows Ryan Fleege and his family as they discover a supernatural camera that reveals terrifying spirits haunting their home. As paranormal events intensify, they uncover a dark connection between the entity Tobi and their young daughter, forcing them to confront a growing evil presence.

The film was released on October 23, 2015. It grossed over $78 million worldwide on a $10 million budget. The film received generally negative reviews; the Rotten Tomatoes consensus says that the franchise's "thrills are mostly gone". Although this film was initially announced and promoted as the final film in the series, a seventh film, Paranormal Activity: Next of Kin, was released in October 2021.

== Plot ==
In 1988, during which young Katie and Kristi watch as their mom's boyfriend Dennis's spine is crushed by a mysterious force, (Note: As depicted in Paranormal Activity 3 (2011).) Grandma Lois takes the girls away to a man who speaks to the girls about "Tobi," and how they are important to Tobi's plan.

In 2013, Ryan Fleege, his wife, Emily, and their six-year-old daughter, Leila, are about to celebrate Christmas. Ryan's brother, Mike, comes to stay with them after breaking up with his girlfriend in Chicago. Ryan and Emily's friend, Skylar, notice that Leila is talking to an imaginary friend named Tobi. Mike finds a box of old video tapes, dating from 1988 to 1992, and a large video camera. The tapes show a young Kristi and Katie living with their mother, Julie, and boyfriend, Dennis, in 1988, while other videos from 1992 record activities in Lois' house, where the girls practice supernatural abilities with the mysterious man. Ryan and Mike notice that in some of the videos, the girls are somehow aware of the Fleeges and their home in 2013.

Ryan notices the old camera picks up spiritual beings. He decides to record continuously in the house and captures a number of paranormal events. After continuing to watch the old tapes, Ryan and Emily discover that their house is built on the same property that Katie and Kristi used to live in before the girls' house burned down in 1992. The Fleeges also realize that the grown-up Katie, masquerading as a real estate agent, sold them the house, which was built by a coven of witches called The Midwives.

Ryan and Emily call a priest named Father Todd, whom Leila attacks. Ryan researches the cult, and realizes the coven killed a family in Nevada, (Note: As depicted in Paranormal Activity 4 (2012).) related to a boy named Hunter, who was born on June 6, 2005 (the sixth day of the sixth month in the sixth year of the new century), the same day as Leila. One of the tapes also shows Hunter in 1992, despite the fact that he had not been born until 2005. Leila's blood is needed to finish Tobi's transformation into a physical being. One night, Leila opens a doorway to another time and location. Ryan and Emily flee with her to a hotel.

Father Todd attempts to cleanse the house but is dragged away by Tobi. Ryan traps the demon in a white sheet soaked with Holy Water and finishes the prayer. Leila returns to normal. However, Skylar vomits blood all over Mike and the blood burns him, killing them both. Ryan is impaled by the demon while running away with Emily. Leila sprints into the "portal" in her room with Emily following; she arrives at Kristi and Katie's mother's house in 1992, where she finds a young Katie, and confronts the "human" version of Tobi. Emily is killed and Leila and "Tobi" walk off as the camera cuts.

=== Alternate ending ===
In an alternate ending, the extermination of the demon was successful. Four months later, Emily, Ryan, and Leila have moved into a new house. While Leila is playing outside, she is seen hand-in-hand with young Katie and Kristi. While celebrating Leila's birthday party, Emily is revealed to be pregnant. Leila blows out the candles on her cake, wishing for a baby brother. Emily states they do not know the sex of their baby yet, and the film ends.

== Cast ==
- Chris J. Murray as Ryan Fleege
- Brit Shaw as Emily Fleege
- Dan Gill as Mike Fleege
- Ivy George as Leila Fleege
- Olivia Taylor Dudley as Skyler
- Michael Krawic as Father Todd
- Chloe Csengery as young Katie
- Jessica Brown as young Kristi
- Hallie Foote as Grandma Lois
- Don McManus as Kent
- Aiden Lovekamp as Hunter Rey
- Cara Pifko as Laura
- Mark Steger as Tobi of the Book of Tobit

== Production ==
Paranormal Activity: The Ghost Dimension was directed by Gregory Plotkin in his directorial debut, and written by Jason Harry Pagan, Andrew Deutschman, Adam Robitel, and Gavin Heffernan. Plotkin served as the editor for the second, third, fourth, and fifth films.

Cinematographer John Rutland gave the actors Sony PMW-200 camcorders for first-person filming, used a Sony NEX-FS700 built to look like a large shoulder-mount camera as a set piece and to film specific scares, and used several Sony a7S cameras for low-light "surveillance" footage.

Industrial Light & Magic created the 3D visual effects, especially for the creation of the Tobi demon.

== Marketing ==
A teaser trailer was released on June 22, and promotional stills were released afterwards. The official first trailer was released the following day at midnight.

== Release ==
The film was originally slated for October 25, 2013, and was then delayed to October 2014. On September 17, 2014, it was announced that the film would be subtitled The Ghost Dimension, and that it was set to be released on March 13, 2015. On January 27, 2015, Paramount Pictures announced that it had pushed the release date back to October 23, 2015, where it was finally released in 3D and RealD 3D.

In July, Paramount announced that it had struck a deal with AMC Entertainment and Cineplex Entertainment to make Scouts Guide to the Zombie Apocalypse and Ghost Dimension available digitally, 17 days after they drop below 300 theaters, as part of a larger experiment, and asked other theaters to join in. In return, Paramount would share an undisclosed portion of proceeds of the VOD revenues. Per industry sources, Paramount is giving participating exhibitors an estimated 2-4% share of their digital revenue made between the time the film drops below 300 theaters and 90 days after its opening date. Those agreeing to Paramount's formula includes AMC, Canada's Cineplex, National Amusements, and Alamo Drafthouse. But many circuits including Regal Cinema, Cinemark, and Carmike have rejected Paramount's offer to release in VOD. This would mean that Ghost Dimension will only go out in roughly 1,350 North American theaters when opening on October 23—compared to 2,883 theaters for the last title and well north of 3,000 theaters for each of the previous three films. According to early pre-release tracking, the film was pacing to open to $10–12 million in the United States and Canada—despite the fact the film had the added benefit of 3D pricing, a first for the series—compared to $18.3 million for Paranormal Activity: The Marked Ones. The reason why Paramount carried out this approach and experimented with these two younger demographic genre movies—which many believe to be a box office failure—was because of the theatrical failure of MGM's Hot Tub Time Machine 2. Rob Moore, vice chairman of Paramount Pictures said, "There is no question that we are going to do less theatrically, but I believe we will make it up digitally. This is about the long-term health of the business, so there is not this long period of time when a consumer can't watch a movie."

=== International ===
The film was released in the United Kingdom and Ireland on October 21, 2015.

=== Home media ===
The film grossed $1.5 million in home sales.

== Reception ==
=== Box office ===
Paranormal Activity: The Ghost Dimension grossed $18.3 million in North America and $60.6 million in other territories for a worldwide total of $78.9 million, against a budget of $10 million, making it the poorest performing film in the series.

The film opened on October 23, 2015, alongside The Last Witch Hunter, Rock the Kasbah, and Jem and the Holograms, as well as the expanded release of Steve Jobs. In its opening weekend, the film had projected to gross $10–12 million from 1,656 theaters, however, some projections had it earning only in the high-single digits. The film made $500,000 from its early Thursday screenings and $3.3 million on its first day. In its opening weekend, the film grossed $8.1 million, finishing sixth at the box office.

=== Critical response ===
On Rotten Tomatoes, the film has an approval rating of 16% based on 75 reviews and an average rating of 3.70/10. The website's critical consensus reads, "Paranormal Activity: The Ghost Dimension ties up some of the franchise's lingering questions, but six films into the series, the thrills are mostly gone." On Metacritic, the film has a score of 30 out of 100 based on reviews from 13 critics, indicating "generally unfavorable reviews". Audiences polled by CinemaScore gave the film an average grade of "C" on an A+ to F scale.

Andrew Barker of Variety wrote: "There may well be new and novel ways to spark audience shivers from not-so-bright homeowners inexplicably using their cameraphones to check out bumps in the night, but this series clearly has neither the patience nor the inclination to look for them anymore." Justin Lowe of The Hollywood Reporter wrote: "Even at this late stage in the evolution of the franchise, logical lapses in filmmaking technique undercut the integrity of the found-footage format, but continuity was never one of the series' strong points, a shortcoming easily forgiven by fans."

Noel Murray of the Los Angeles Times gave it a positive review: "At its most basic level, the "Paranormal Activity" formula still has some kick, with its combination of creepy lo-fi video and tasteful suburbia creating some strong, unsettling dissonance."

== Reboot ==
Although The Ghost Dimension was promoted as a final installment in the series, Paramount announced in June 2019 that a seventh installment was in development. The film was set to be released on March 19, 2021. However, in August 2020, the film was delayed to March 4, 2022. In February 2021, it was announced that William Eubank had been hired to direct the film which was written by series veteran Christopher Landon. The film was moved up to October 29, 2021, and was released straight to Paramount+.
