= The Perfect Nanny (TV series) =

Television series

- Genre: Thriller
- Created by: Maya Erskine
- Based on: The Perfect Nanny by Leïla Slimani
- Starring: Nicole Kidman; Maya Erskine
- Country of origin: United States
- Original language: English

Production
- Executive producers: Nicole Kidman; Per Saari; Maya Erskine; Pascal Caucheteux; Philippe Godeau
- Production companies: Blossom Films; Why Not Productions; Pan-Européenne; Legendary Television

Original release
- Network: HBO

The Perfect Nanny is an upcoming American television series based on an adaption by Maya Erskine from the Leïla Slimani novel of the same name and is produced and starred by Nicole Kidman and Maya Erskine.

== Premise ==
In The Perfect Nanny, a seemingly flawless nanny is hired by a couple with two young children; however, her initially helpful demeanor gradually descends into something sinister.

== Cast ==
- Nicole Kidman
- Maya Erskine

== Production ==
In January 2023, it was reported that Nicole Kidman and Maya Erskine, co-creator and co-lead of Pen15 are slated to star in the project. Maya Erskine serves as the creator and writer of the limited series, adapted from Leïla Slimani's novel of the same name. Legendary Entertainment co-produces the series alongside HBO after highly competitive bidding.
