= The Husband's Secret =

2013 novel by Liane Moriarty

- The front cover of the first edition (hardcover)
- Author: Liane Moriarty
- Language: English
- Genre: Thriller
- Publisher: Berkley Books; Putnam/Amy Einhorn
- Publication date: 30 July 2013
- Publication place: Australia
- Media type: Print (hardback and paperback), e-book, audiobook
- Pages: 396
- ISBN: 9780399159343

The Husband's Secret is a novel by Liane Moriarty that was first published on 30 July 2013. The novel tells the story of three women, whose lives unexpectedly interconnect after one of them discovers a devastating secret.

== Synopsis ==
The novel is set in Sydney, Australia, where Cecilia Fitzpatrick is a happily married mother-of-three who leads a seemingly perfect life. Meanwhile, Tess O'Leary is a career woman who returns to Sydney with her son after her husband, Will, confesses that he is in love with her cousin and best friend, Felicity. Tess' son and Cecilia's children are enrolled in the same school, where Tess' ex-boyfriend, Connor Whitby, is a PE teacher. Rachel Crowley, the school secretary, suspects that Connor is the man responsible for the unsolved murder of her daughter that still haunts her almost three decades later.

Then one day, when Cecilia's husband John-Paul is away, she finds a letter from her husband to be opened only in the event of his death. Cecilia opens the letter anyway, and the devastating secret she discovers has massive consequences for her and the other women.

== Reception ==
The novel was well received. Entertainment Weekly's Leah Greenblatt gave the novel an "A−" rating, describing it as "a sharp, thoughtful read". Publishers Weekly concluded that, "Simultaneously a page-turner and a book one has to put down occasionally to think about and absorb, Moriarty’s novel challenges the reader as well as her characters, but in the best possible way."

USA Today's Patty Rhule gave the novel three-and-a-half stars out of four, noting that Moriarty "avoids an unfortunate trend in women's fiction to make men bad guys or doofuses. The men in The Husband's Secret are fully realized, thoughtful and caring, as flawed and faithful as the women who love them." Writing for The Guardian, author Sophie Hannah selected the novel as one of her "top 10 pageturners", adding that "it's a perfectly paced mystery with a beautiful solution and a breathtakingly twisty final chapter."

The novel made both The New York Times and the USA Today Best Seller lists.

== Adaptation ==
In September 2013, CBS Films acquired the rights to the novel. in May 2017, it was announced that the film would star Blake Lively.

In February 2022, Kat Coiro was announced as director of the film, with Sony Pictures distributing.
