= Dreaming of Amelia =

Book by Jaclyn Moriarty

- First edition, 2009
- Author: Jaclyn Moriarty
- Language: English
- Series: Ashbury/Brookfield Series
- Genre: Gothic fiction, young adult literature
- Published: 2009; 2010 (US)
- Publisher: Pan MacMillan; Arthur A. Levine Books (US)
- Publication place: Australia
- Pages: 480
- ISBN: 9780330425278
- OCLC: 427527371
- Preceded by: The Betrayal of Bindy Mackenzie

Dreaming of Amelia is a young adult novel by Jaclyn Moriarty. It is the fourth book in the Ashbury/Brookfield series, a series of epistolary novels revolving around students who attend a private school, Ashbury High, or the local comprehensive school, Brookfield High, in the suburbs of Sydney. Each book in the series can be read as a standalone novel. Dreaming of Amelia was published as The Ghosts of Ashbury High in the US.

== Plot summary ==
Dreaming of Amelia is the story of teenagers Amelia and Riley. They are seen as bad kids from Brookfield High who transfer to Ashbury High. They have been girlfriend and boyfriend since they were 14, and they are aloof and intriguing to the other kids. The story is told through memoirs written as part of the gothic fiction elective in the HSC English exam. It is the story of secrets, ghosts, passion and more.

== Reception ==
Kirkus Reviews praised the book, calling it "quirky, comic and self-referential" and stating that it would please fans of Moriarty's books and create new ones. Publishers Weekly also gave the book a positive review, stating that it "creates a compelling collective portrait of adolescence". They also mentioned that while fans would enjoy the callbacks to the rest of the series, the book stands on its own.

== Awards and honors ==
- New South Wales Premier's Literary Awards, Shortlisted Book
- Prime Minister's Literary Awards, Highly Commended
