= Janelle Brown =

American writer

Janelle Brown (born September 12, 1973) is an American novelist.

From 1995 to 1998, she worked at Wired, helping launch Wired News, and was named one of the Top 25 Women on the Web. From 1998 to 2002, Brown worked as a senior writer at Salon.com, writing about technology and culture. She was also the co-founder of Maxi, an early online feminist zine.

Five of her novels have made the New York Times bestseller list. Her 2020 novel Pretty Things is currently being adapted as a television series reported to include actress Nicole Kidman.

== Novels ==
- All We Ever Wanted Was Everything, 2008
- This is Where We Live, 2010
- Watch Me Disappear, 2017
- Pretty Things, 2020
- I'll Be You, 2022
- What Kind of Paradise, 2025
