= Liane Moriarty =

Australian author (born 1966)

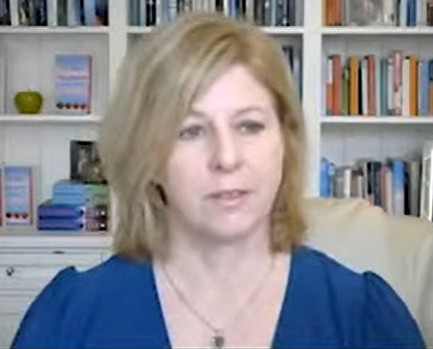
- Moriarty in 2022
- Born: November 1966 (age 59)
- Occupation: Novelist
- Relatives: Jaclyn Moriarty (sister)
- Writing career
- Notable works: The Husband's Secret; Big Little Lies; Truly Madly Guilty; Nine Perfect Strangers; Apples Never Fall

Liane Moriarty (born November 1966) is an Australian author. She began her career in advertising and marketing before publishing her first novel, Three Wishes, in 2003. She has since written ten novels, which have sold more than 20 million copies worldwide. Four of Moriarty's novels—Big Little Lies, Nine Perfect Strangers, The Last Anniversary, and Apples Never Fall—have been adapted into television series, and she was the first Australian author to debut in the top position on The New York Times Best Seller list.

Moriarty has been described as an author of women's fiction. Her novels typically feature middle-class suburban women as characters, and are often centred on a crime or mysterious death. Her writing frequently explores themes of domestic abuse, grief, and infertility.

== Early life and education ==
Liane Moriarty was born in November 1966 as the eldest of six children. She grew up in Sydney, Australia, in a middle-class Catholic family. Her father Bernie was an aerial surveyor, while her mother Diane was a homemaker and foster carer. She studied at the University of Technology Sydney.

== Career ==
After considering a career in journalism, Moriarty began her career as an advertising copywriter. She eventually began operating her own freelance copywriting business, where she was hired to write copy that appeared on the back of cereal boxes, and spent time working in marketing for a legal publisher. In 2000 her sister Jaclyn Moriarty published her first novel and won a New South Wales Premier's Literary Award. Motivated by her sister's success, she began attempting to write a book of her own. She first wrote a children's book about the Olympics but was unsuccessful in finding a publisher for the work. She enrolled in a graduate course in creative writing at Macquarie University and wrote her first novel, Three Wishes, as part of her course.

Moriarty sold Three Wishes in 2002 to Pan Macmillan, which published it the following year. The novel follows Australian triplets and describes the series of events over the course of a year that lead one sister to stab another with a fork. A review of the novel in Publishers Weekly described it as an enjoyable read with "quirky and lovable" characters but deemed its plot predictable. A more negative review in Kirkus Reviews described the novel as featuring a "sneering tone and choppy style". Moriarty published her second novel, The Last Anniversary, in 2005. The novel follows the Doughty family, who live on a remote Australian island and become famous and wealthy after adopting an abandoned infant, but are eventually torn apart by money problems and inheritance disputes. A review in Kirkus Reviews criticised the novel's large cast of characters and wrote that the work lacked a sympathetic protagonist. The novel received a starred review in Publishers Weekly, however, which said that Moriarty adeptly managed the relationships between her characters.

Between 2007 and 2010, Moriarty published a series of children's books in her "Nicola Berry" series. She published her next novel, What Alice Forgot, in 2010. The novel follows a woman who experiences amnesia and loses ten years of her memories after an accident. A review in Publishers Weekly praised the novel's pacing and described it as an enjoyable read, while a review in Kirkus Reviews concluded that the novel was "cheerfully engaging". Her next novel The Hypnotist's Love Story, published in 2012, depicts a Sydney-based hypnotherapist who begins to be followed by the former partner of her new boyfriend. Kirkus Reviews described the novel as a "satisfying beach read" that blended comedy and melodrama, while a review in Publishers Weekly wrote that the novel had an intriguing premise and strong storytelling.

Moriarty achieved her first major literary success in 2013 with the publication of her novel The Husband's Secret, which was optioned by CBS and became a bestseller. The novel follows a woman in suburban Sydney whose life is upturned after she opens a secret letter from her husband. In 2014 Moriarty followed this with Big Little Lies, which depicts the friendship between the mothers of three kindergarten students in the months leading up to a death at a parents' fundraiser. In a review in The Washington Post, Carol Memmott wrote that the novel takes a "powerful stand against domestic violence", while a starred review in Kirkus Reviews said that the novel featured "wit, good humor, sharp insight into human nature and addictive storytelling". The novel was adapted into an HBO series starring Reese Witherspoon, Shailene Woodley, and Nicole Kidman in 2017.

Moriarty released her next novel Truly Madly Guilty in 2016. The novel follows two best friends who attend a barbecue where conflicts break out among the attendees. A negative review in The New York Times Book Review described the novel as featuring a contrived and formulaic plot with little suspense, while a review in Kirkus Reviews concluded that the novel was "not one of Moriarty's best outings". A more positive review in The Washington Post described the novel as "emotionally riveting" and wrote that it featured a strong and relatable cast of characters. In 2018 Moriarty published Nine Perfect Strangers, a novel about a group of clients at an Australian spa resort. In The New York Times Book Review, Lisa Scottoline wrote that the novel featured characters who were "fully realized, with compelling lives, relationships and motivations", and raised interesting questions for the reader about cults and wellness. The novel was adapted into a Hulu series starring Nicole Kidman in 2021.

In 2021 Moriarty published her novel Apples Never Fall, which depicts the disappearance of a tennis-playing Sydney grandmother. In a review in The Guardian, Beejay Silcox wrote that while the novel was an enjoyable read, its subplot about a woman who falsely claims to be a victim of domestic abuse caused the novel to feel "indulgently overgarnished". In The New York Times, Ivy Pochoda wrote that the novel's characters were well-crafted but that its ending was unsatisfying. The novel was adapted into a Peacock miniseries in 2024. Moriarty published her tenth novel, Here One Moment, in 2024, in which a woman predicts the time and cause of death of a group of passengers on a flight from Sydney to Hobart. The novel follows how the passengers react as her predictions begin to come true. In a review in The New York Times, the critic Leah Greenblatt wrote that the novel featured strong characters but felt like "a work in progress still searching for its final form".

== Reception, themes, and style ==
Moriarty's books have sold 20 million copies, and have all been optioned for film and television adaptations. She was the first Australian author to have three books reach the top position on The New York Times Best Seller list, and was also the first Australian author to debut in the top position. Four of her novels—Big Little Lies, Nine Perfect Strangers, The Last Anniversary and Apples Never Fall—have been adapted into television series. Despite their Australian setting, Moriarty's books were initially far more popular in the United States than in her home country. In 2016, the Sydney Morning Herald reported that Moriarty remained an obscure writer in Australia, while her Australian publisher Cate Paterson said in 2014 that it was her own "career despair" that Moriarty had failed to attract a substantial local readership despite her overseas success. In The New York Times, Leah Greenblatt wrote in 2024 that despite Moriarty's commercial success, her novels are "still consigned to the metaphorical broom closet of 'women's fiction'"; Moriarty has said that she embraces the labelling of her novels as part of the women's fiction genre.

Moriarty's novels often explore sources of trauma, including death and domestic violence, within the context of her characters' domestic lives. Her characters are typically middle-class suburban women (a demographic that also makes up the core of her readership), and her plots are often centred on a crime or mystery. Women's grief and rage, social politics, and class tensions are all frequent themes of her writing. Moriarty has also drawn on her own experiences of infertility in her novels. Greenblatt writes that Moriarty's writing features "breezy yet propulsive storytelling" while exploring contemporary issues like domestic abuse and wellness culture.

== Personal life ==
Moriarty is married to Adam, a former farmer from Tasmania, and has two children. She had an earlier marriage in her twenties that ended in separation. Her sisters Jaclyn Moriarty and Nicola Moriarty are also authors.

== Bibliography ==
=== Novels ===
- 2004 Three Wishes
- 2005 The Last Anniversary
- 2010 What Alice Forgot
- 2011 The Hypnotist's Love Story
- 2013 The Husband's Secret
- 2014 Big Little Lies
- 2016 Truly Madly Guilty
- 2018 Nine Perfect Strangers
- 2021 Apples Never Fall
- 2024 Here One Moment
- 2026 Big Little Truths (Big Little #2)

=== Children's books ===
The Space Brigade series (also known as Nicola Berry: Earthling Ambassador):

1. The Petrifying Problem with Princess Petronella (2007)
2. The Shocking Trouble on the Planet of Shobble (2009)
3. The Wicked War on the Planet of Whimsy (2010)
