= Big Little Lies (novel) =

2014 novel by Liane Moriarty

- Author: Liane Moriarty
- Published: 2014
- Publisher: Penguin Publishing
- ISBN: 978-0-399-16706-5

Big Little Lies is a 2014 novel written by Australian author Liane Moriarty. It was published in July 2014 by Penguin Publishing. The novel made the New York Times Best Seller list. In 2015, it was a recipient of the Davitt Award.

== Synopsis ==
Jane, a single mother, is on her way to Pirriwee Public School in Sydney's Northern Beaches, where her son Ziggy is starting prep. On the way, she meets Madeline, another mother with a daughter of the same age. Madeline's friend Celeste is also sending her twin sons, Max and Josh, to school. The two strike up a friendship with Jane. All three of them have their own problems: Madeline is resentful that her daughter from her previous marriage is growing close to her ex-husband's new wife, Bonnie; Celeste is physically abused by her rich banker husband, Perry; and Jane was raped and left to raise her son Ziggy on her own. To make matters worse for her, Ziggy is accused of bullying Amabella, his future classmate, during orientation.

As months pass, the three become close and Jane shares her experience with the other women. Jane tells the two other women that Ziggy is the result of a rape by a man named Saxon Banks when Jane was 19. Celeste and Madeline realize that the father is Perry's cousin, but decide to keep it from Jane for the time being. Meanwhile, Celeste's marriage becomes even more violent and she starts meeting with a counselor and rents an apartment for herself and her sons without Perry's knowledge. Ziggy is once again accused of bullying Amabella, and again denies it. Jane finds out that Ziggy is keeping a secret about who is hurting Amabella and persuades him to write down the name of the child, which turns out to be Max, one of Celeste's twins, but she is not sure how to broach the subject with Celeste.

On the night of Pirriwee Public's Trivia Night, Josh tells Celeste that it is Max, not Ziggy, who is bullying the other children. She realizes that Max is emulating Perry and finally decides to leave him. Perry finds out about Celeste's apartment, and despite a heated argument, the couple still go to the Trivia Night.

Once they reach the school, Jane sees Perry and realizes that he is, in fact, the man who raped her and confronts him in front of Madeline and Celeste. Celeste recalls Perry's childhood stories where he used his cousin's name to avoid trouble for himself. Perry admits to raping Jane but shows no remorse. In the ensuing argument between them, Perry hits Celeste. Enraged by what she has witnessed, Bonnie pushes him, and he falls from the balcony to his death.

In the aftermath of the fall, Madeline finds out that Bonnie's father was abusive and seeing Perry's violence brought back memories of witnessing her father beat her mother. Everybody on the balcony decides to lie to protect Bonnie, but she turns herself in. She is convicted of accidental manslaughter and sentenced to 200 hours of community service. A year after Perry's death, Celeste works in a family law firm and sets up a trust fund for Ziggy. She speaks publicly about her abusive relationship, starting her speech with: "This can happen to anyone."

== Writing ==
Moriarty's main inspiration for the story came from a radio interview she heard in which a woman recounted her parents' abusive relationship. The woman narrated how, even as an adult, she hid under her bed to escape her parents' fighting, an experience Moriarty ended up using as a scene in the book. Initially, the book was a first-person narrative from each of the three main characters, but Moriarty soon decided against it, instead interjecting minor characters' statements between portions of the story.

== Reception ==
Big Little Lies has generally been well received by critics, who praised the book's balance of humour with more serious issues like domestic abuse. Janet Maslin of The New York Times wrote: "A seemingly fluffy book suddenly touches base with vicious reality, in ways that may give Big Little Lies even more staying power than The Husband's Secret [Moriarty's previous book]." Roberta Bernstein of USA Today gave it three stars out of four, deeming it "a fun, engaging and sometimes disturbing read, even if the characters are more conceits than flesh and blood." Leah Greenblatt of Entertainment Weekly gave it an A and noted that, while the book fell in the "chick-lit" category, Moriarty still offered "insights [that] aren't any less wise or funny or true just because she sometimes likes a champagne metaphor or hangs her story on a shoe." Carol Memmott of The Washington Post wrote, "It takes a powerful stand against domestic violence even as it makes us laugh at the adults whose silly costume party seems more reminiscent of a middle-school dance."

== Television adaptation ==
A television miniseries adaptation of the novel was produced for HBO titled Big Little Lies, filmed on location in Monterey, California. The miniseries premiered on HBO on 19 February 2017 and stars Nicole Kidman, Reese Witherspoon, Shailene Woodley, Alexander Skarsgård, Adam Scott, Laura Dern, and Zoë Kravitz. It won eight awards at the 69th Primetime Emmy Awards including Outstanding Limited Series.

Despite being called a miniseries, HBO announced in December 2017 that the series would return for a second season, based on a novella by Moriarty. Kidman said in 2024 that Moriarty "is delivering the book" for a third season.
