= 26th Screen Actors Guild Awards =

- Awarded for: Outstanding motion picture and primetime television performances
- Date: January 19, 2020
- Location: Shrine Auditorium, Los Angeles, California
- Country: United States
- Presented by: SAG-AFTRA
- Website: www.sagawards.org

Television/radio coverage
- Network: TNT and TBS simultaneous broadcast

The 26th Annual Screen Actors Guild Awards, honoring the best achievements in film and television performances for the year 2019, were presented on January 19, 2020 at the Shrine Auditorium in Los Angeles, California. The ceremony was broadcast live on both TNT and TBS 8:00 p.m. EST / 5:00 p.m. PST. The nominees were announced on December 11, 2019.

Robert De Niro was announced as the 2019 SAG Life Achievement Award recipient on November 12, 2019.

Parasite made history by becoming the first foreign-language film to win Outstanding Performance by a Cast in a Motion Picture.

== Winners and nominees ==
- Note: Winners are listed first and highlighted in **boldface**.

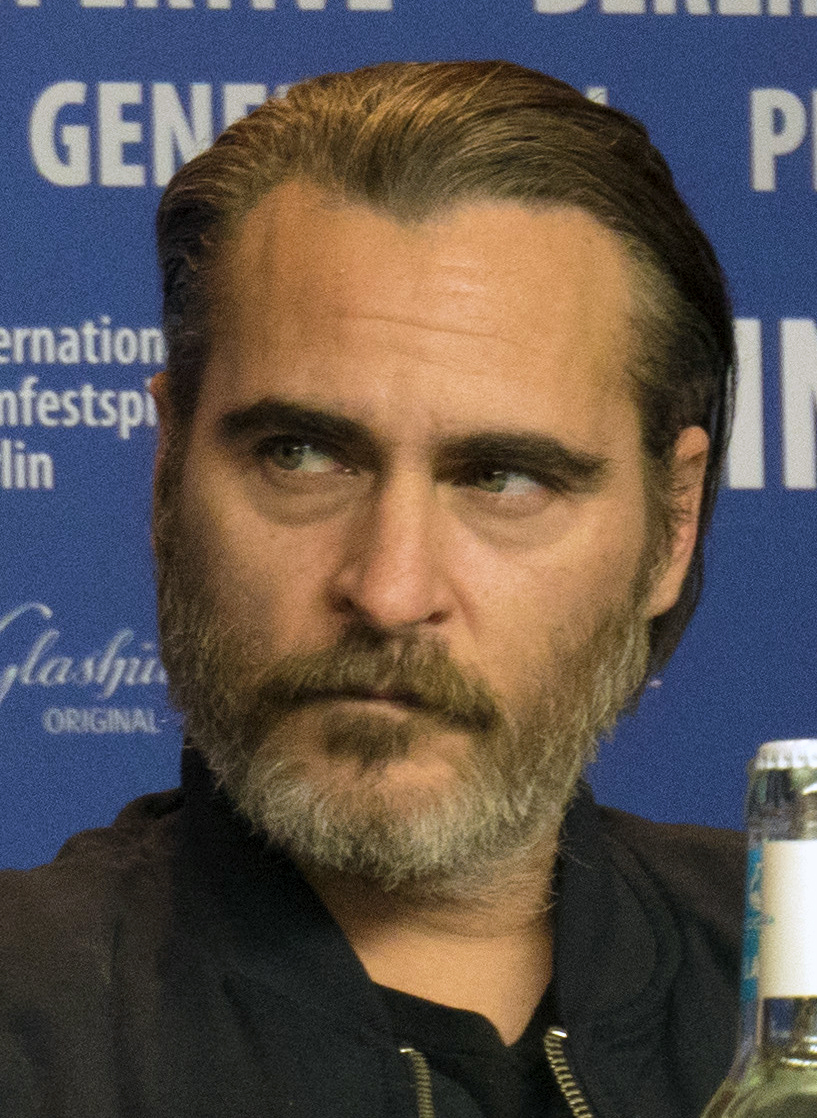
Joaquin Phoenix, Outstanding Performance by a Male Actor in a Leading Role in a Motion Picture winner

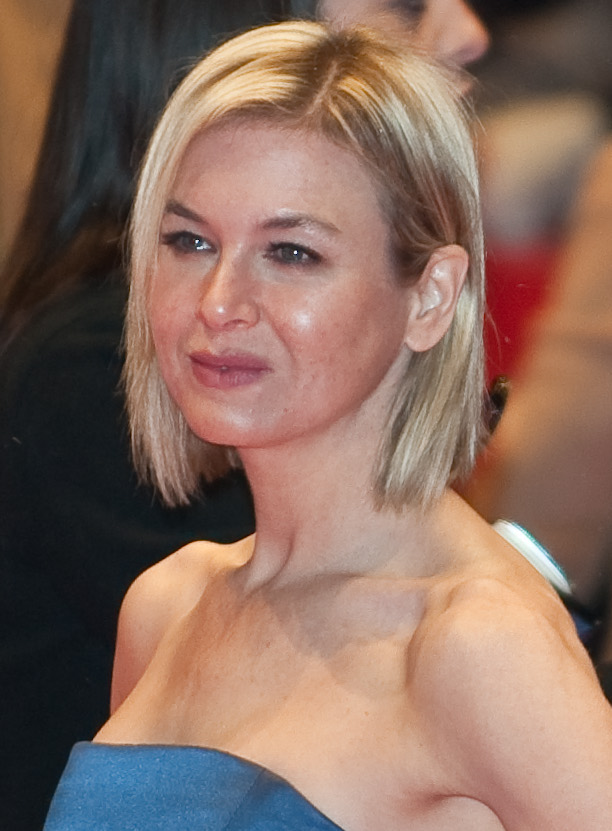
Renée Zellweger, Outstanding Performance by a Female Actor in a Leading Role in a Motion Picture winner

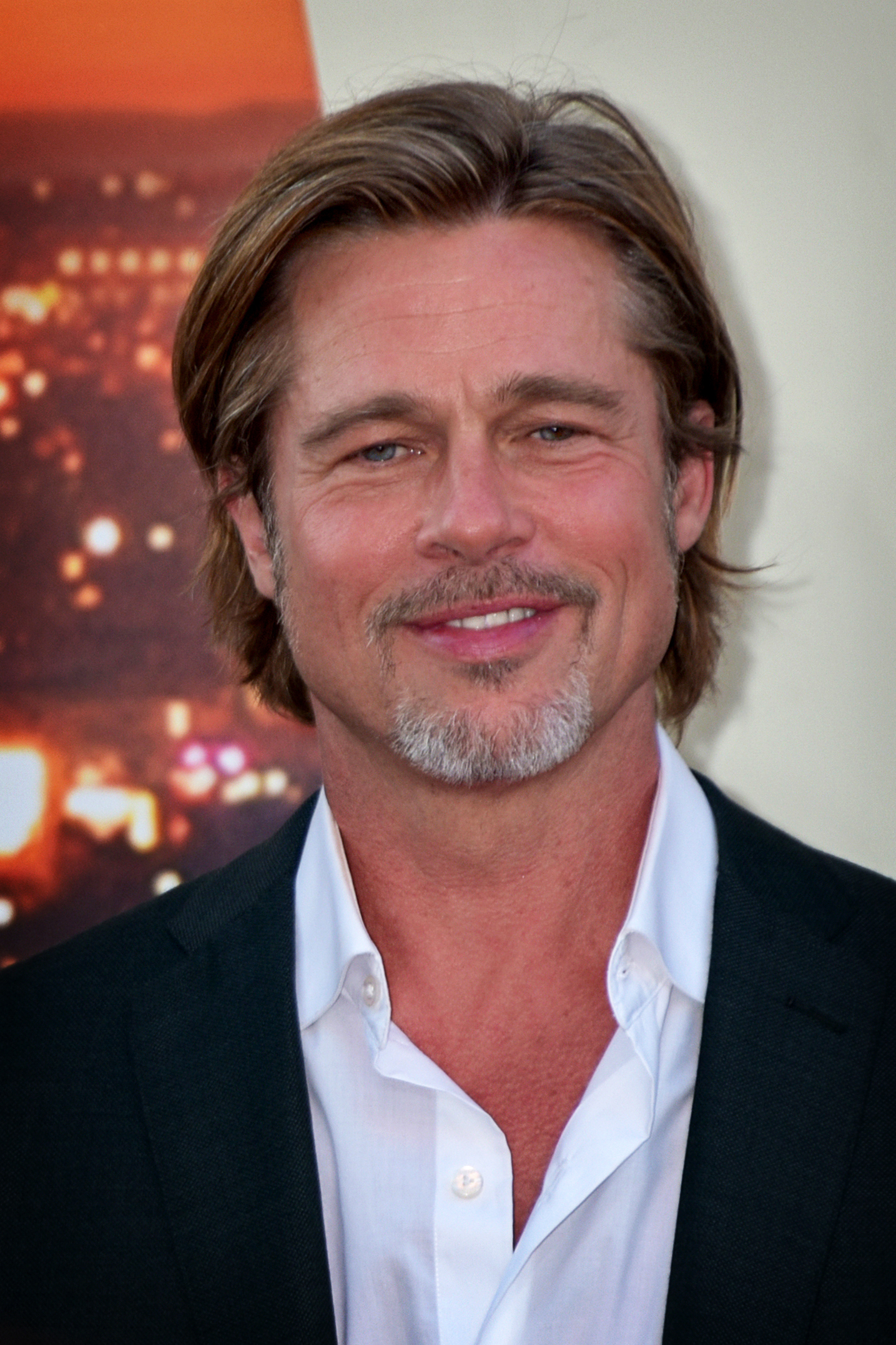
Brad Pitt, Outstanding Performance by a Male Actor in a Supporting Role in a Motion Picture winner

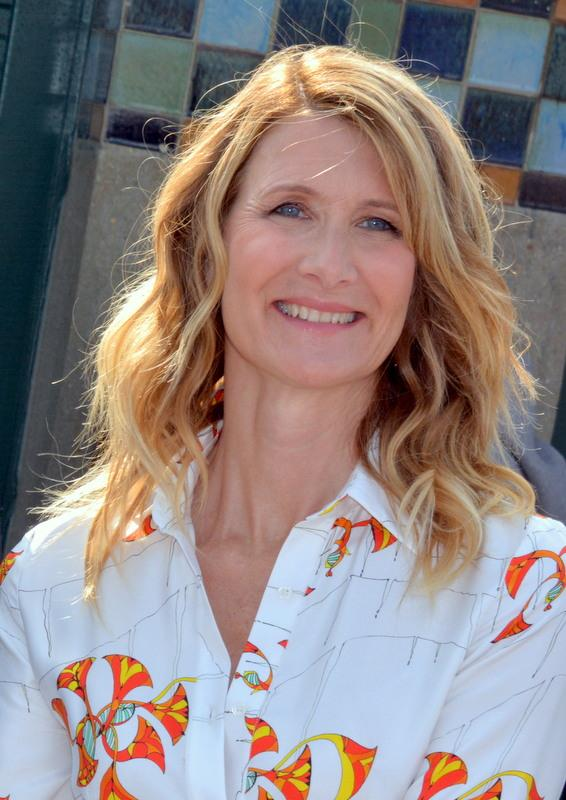
Laura Dern, Outstanding Performance by a Female Actor in a Supporting Role in a Motion Picture winner

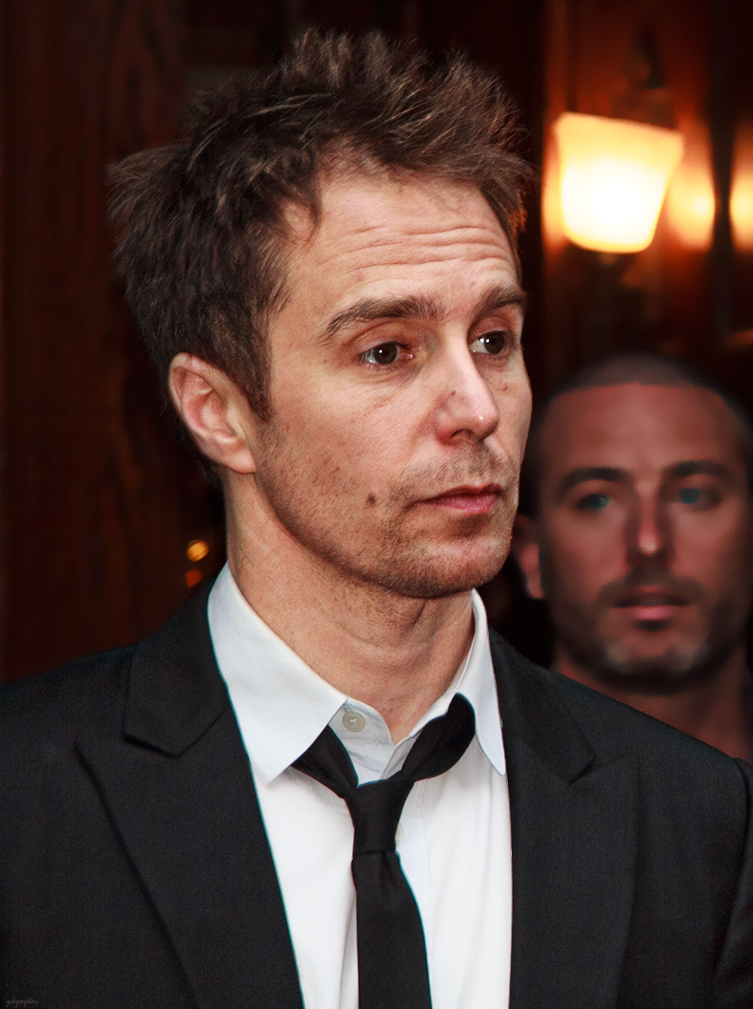
Sam Rockwell, Outstanding Performance by a Male Actor in a Television Movie or Miniseries winner

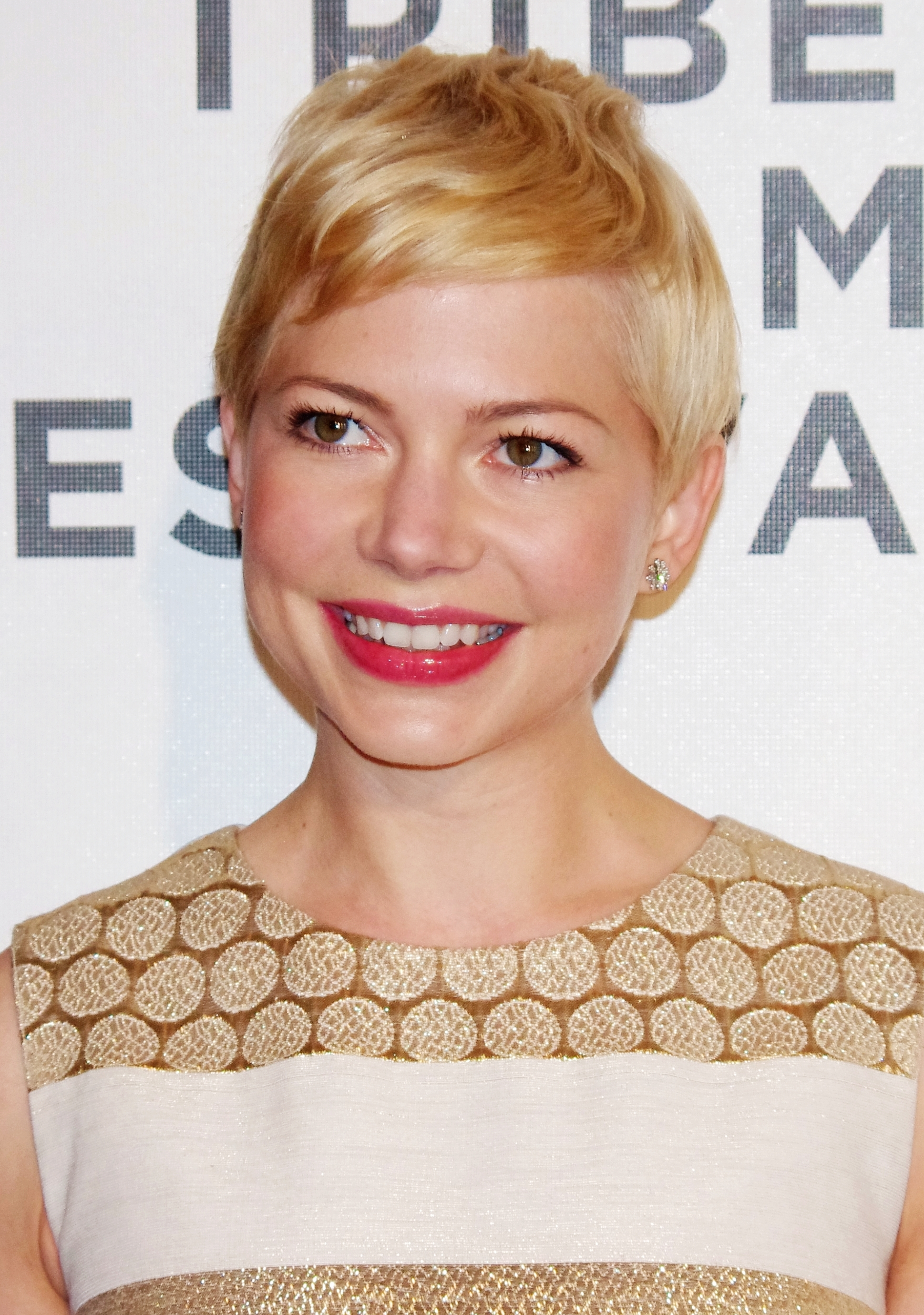
Michelle Williams, Outstanding Performance by a Female Actor in a Television Movie or Miniseries winner

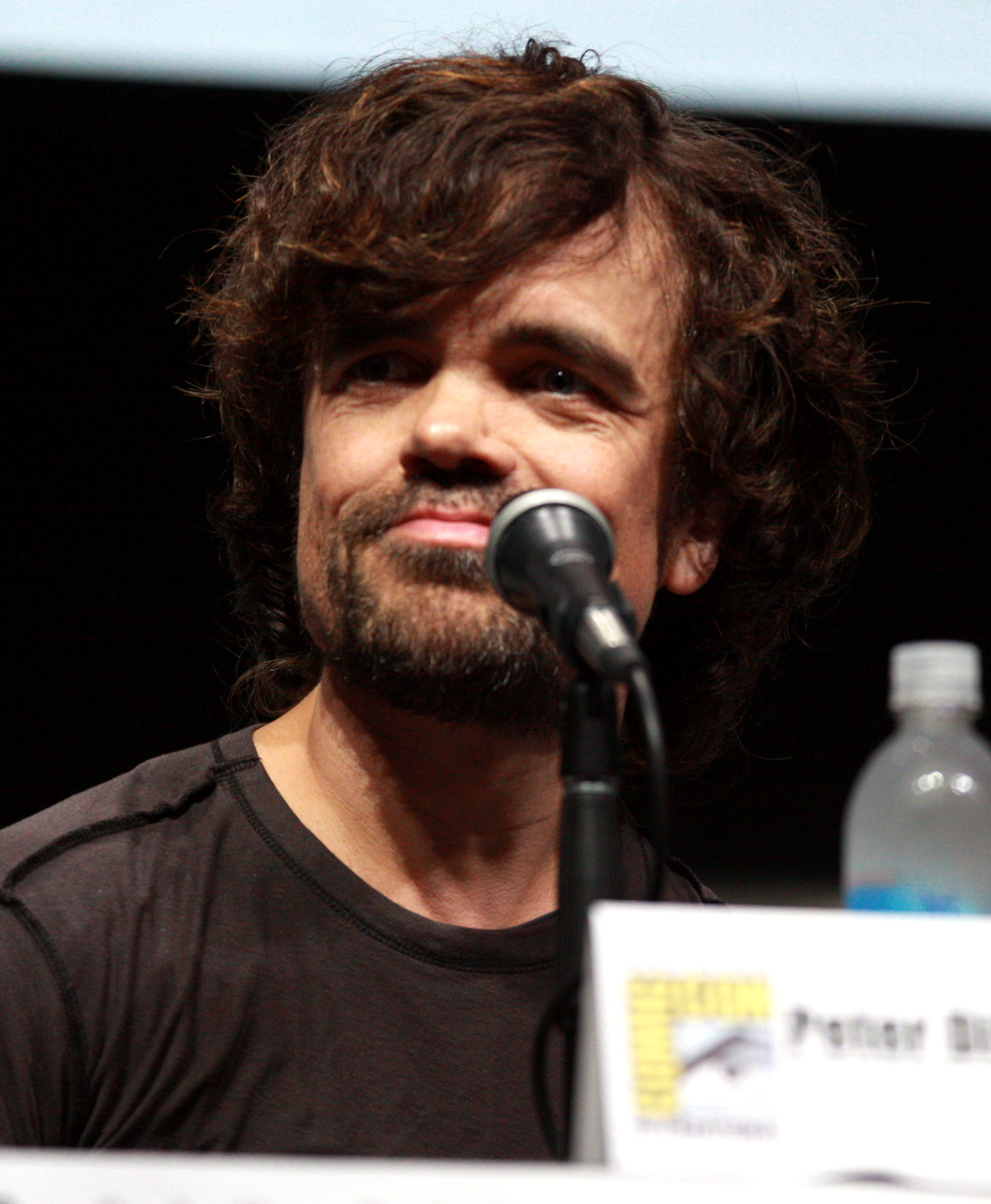
Peter Dinklage, Outstanding Performance by a Male Actor in a Drama Series winner

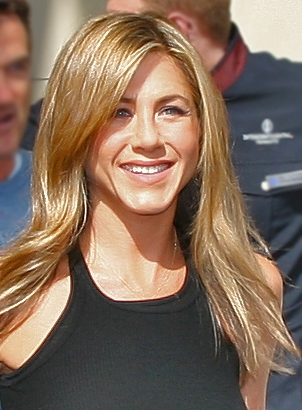
Jennifer Aniston, Outstanding Performance by a Female Actor in a Drama Series winner

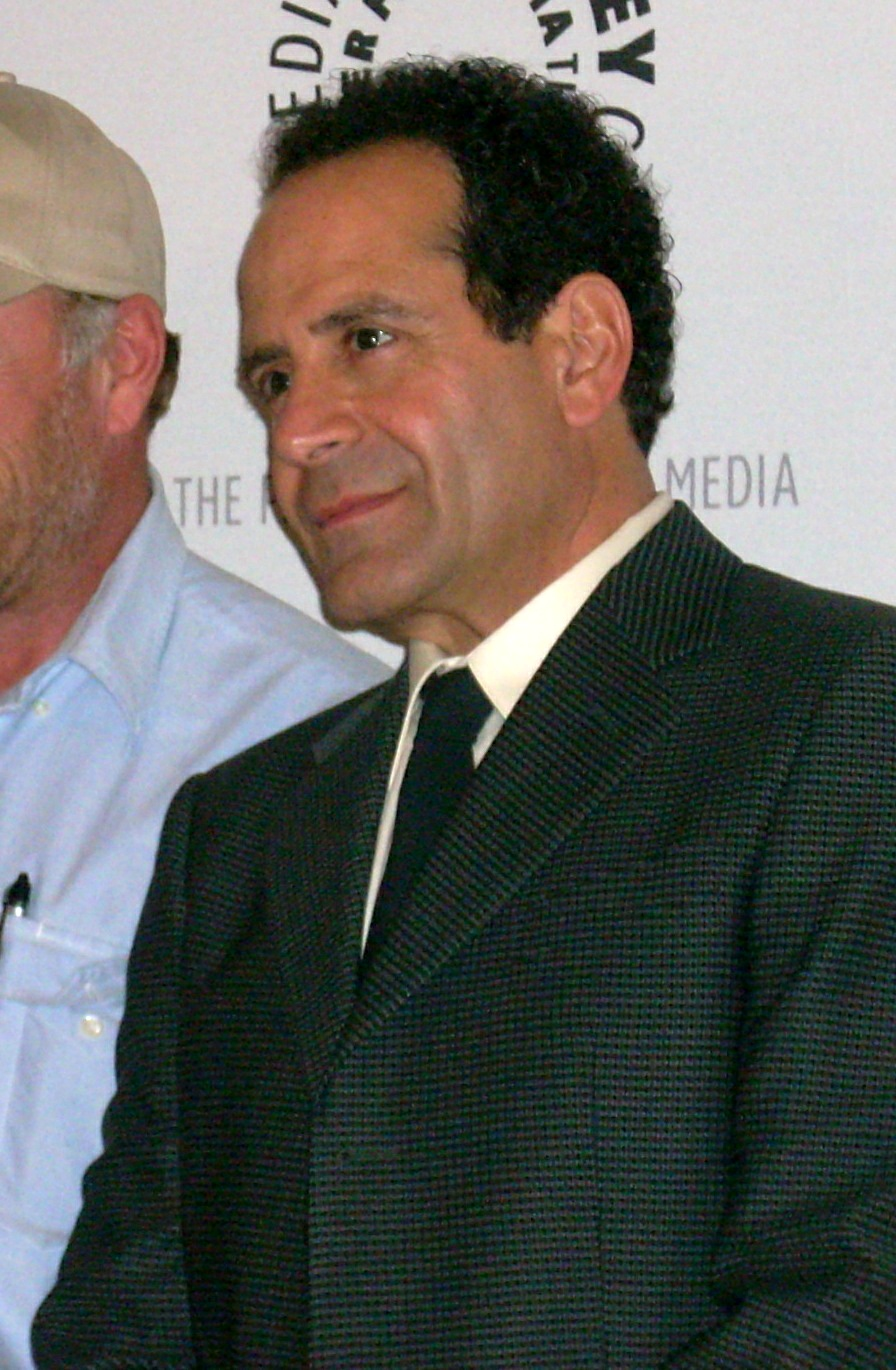
Tony Shalhoub, Outstanding Performance by a Male Actor in a Comedy Series winner

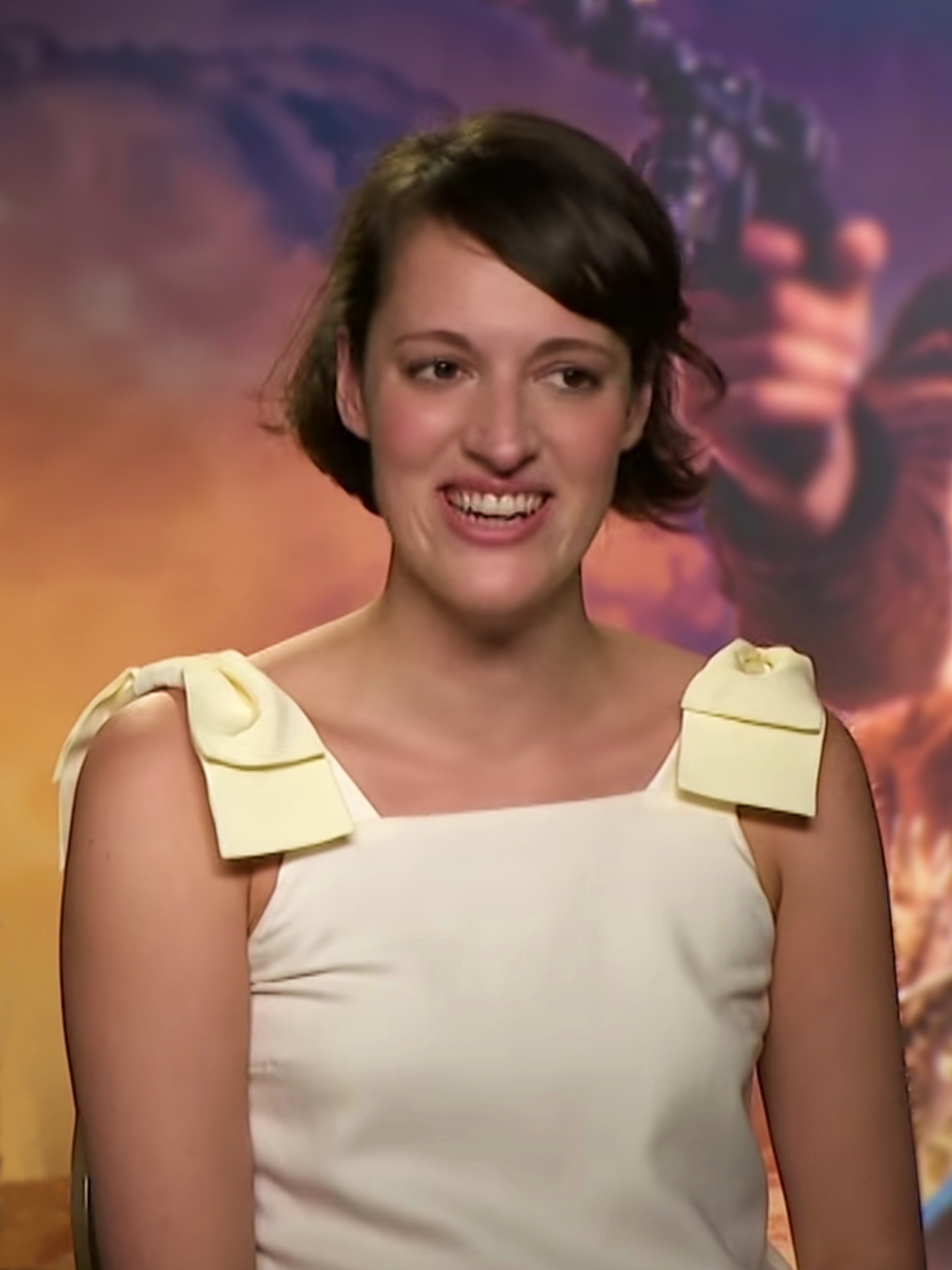
Phoebe Waller-Bridge, Outstanding Performance by a Female Actor in a Comedy Series winner

=== Film ===
Outstanding Performance by a Male Actor in a Leading Role	Outstanding Performance by a Female Actor in a Leading Role
**Joaquin Phoenix – Joker as Arthur Fleck / Joker**; Christian Bale – Ford v Ferrari as Ken Miles; Leonardo DiCaprio – Once Upon a Time in Hollywood as Rick Dalton; Adam Driver – Marriage Story as Charlie Barber; Taron Egerton – Rocketman as Elton John	**Renée Zellweger – Judy as Judy Garland**; Cynthia Erivo – Harriet as Harriet Tubman; Scarlett Johansson – Marriage Story as Nicole Barber; Lupita Nyong'o – Us as Adelaide Wilson / Red; Charlize Theron – Bombshell as Megyn Kelly
Outstanding Performance by a Male Actor in a Supporting Role	Outstanding Performance by a Female Actor in a Supporting Role
**Brad Pitt – Once Upon a Time in Hollywood as Cliff Booth**; Jamie Foxx – Just Mercy as Walter McMillian; Tom Hanks – A Beautiful Day in the Neighborhood as Fred Rogers; Al Pacino – The Irishman as Jimmy Hoffa; Joe Pesci – The Irishman as Russell Bufalino	**Laura Dern – Marriage Story as Nora Fanshaw**; Scarlett Johansson – Jojo Rabbit as Rosie Betzler; Nicole Kidman – Bombshell as Gretchen Carlson; Jennifer Lopez – Hustlers as Ramona Vega; Margot Robbie – Bombshell as Kayla Pospisil
Outstanding Performance by a Cast in a Motion Picture
**Parasite – Jang Hye-jin, Cho Yeo-jeong, Choi Woo-shik, Jung Hyeon-jun, Jung Ji-so, Lee Jung-eun, Lee Sun-kyun, Park So-dam, Park Myung-hoon, and Song Kang-ho**; Bombshell – Connie Britton, Allison Janney, Nicole Kidman, John Lithgow, Malcolm McDowell, Kate McKinnon, Margot Robbie, and Charlize Theron; The Irishman – Bobby Cannavale, Robert De Niro, Stephen Graham, Harvey Keitel, Al Pacino, Anna Paquin, Joe Pesci, and Ray Romano; Jojo Rabbit – Alfie Allen, Roman Griffin Davis, Scarlett Johansson, Thomasin McKenzie, Stephen Merchant, Sam Rockwell, Taika Waititi, and Rebel Wilson; Once Upon a Time in Hollywood – Austin Butler, Julia Butters, Bruce Dern, Leonardo DiCaprio, Dakota Fanning, Emile Hirsch, Damian Lewis, Mike Moh, Timothy Olyphant, Al Pacino, Luke Perry (posthumous), Brad Pitt, Margaret Qualley, and Margot Robbie
Outstanding Performance by a Stunt Ensemble in a Motion Picture
**Avengers: Endgame**; Ford v Ferrari; The Irishman; Joker; Once Upon a Time in Hollywood

=== Television ===
Outstanding Performance by a Male Actor in a Television Movie or Miniseries	Outstanding Performance by a Female Actor in a Television Movie or Miniseries
**Sam Rockwell – Fosse/Verdon (FX) as Bob Fosse**; Mahershala Ali – True Detective (HBO) as Wayne Hays; Russell Crowe – The Loudest Voice (Showtime) as Roger Ailes; Jared Harris – Chernobyl (HBO) as Valery Legasov; Jharrel Jerome – When They See Us (Netflix) as Korey Wise	**Michelle Williams – Fosse/Verdon (FX) as Gwen Verdon**; Patricia Arquette – The Act (Hulu) as Dee Dee Blanchard; Toni Collette – Unbelievable (Netflix) as Det. Grace Rasmussen; Joey King – The Act (Hulu) as Gypsy Rose Blanchard; Emily Watson – Chernobyl (HBO) as Ulana Khomyuk
Outstanding Performance by a Male Actor in a Drama Series	Outstanding Performance by a Female Actor in a Drama Series
**Peter Dinklage – Game of Thrones (HBO) as Tyrion Lannister**; Sterling K. Brown – This Is Us (NBC) as Randall Pearson; Steve Carell – The Morning Show (Apple TV+) as Mitch Kessler; Billy Crudup – The Morning Show (Apple TV+) as Corey Ellison; David Harbour – Stranger Things (Netflix) as Jim Hopper	**Jennifer Aniston – The Morning Show (Apple TV+) as Alex Levy**; Helena Bonham Carter – The Crown (Netflix) as Princess Margaret; Olivia Colman – The Crown (Netflix) as Queen Elizabeth II; Jodie Comer – Killing Eve (BBC America) as Villanelle; Elisabeth Moss – The Handmaid's Tale (Hulu) as June Osborne / Offred
Outstanding Performance by a Male Actor in a Comedy Series	Outstanding Performance by a Female Actor in a Comedy Series
**Tony Shalhoub – The Marvelous Mrs. Maisel (Amazon Prime Video) as Abe Weissman**; Alan Arkin – The Kominsky Method (Netflix) as Norman Newlander; Michael Douglas – The Kominsky Method (Netflix) as Sandy Kominsky; Bill Hader – Barry (HBO) as Barry Berkman / Barry Block; Andrew Scott – Fleabag (Prime Video) as The Priest	**Phoebe Waller-Bridge – Fleabag (Prime Video) as Fleabag**; Christina Applegate – Dead to Me (Netflix) as Jen Harding; Alex Borstein – The Marvelous Mrs. Maisel (Prime Video) as Susie Myerson; Rachel Brosnahan – The Marvelous Mrs. Maisel (Prime Video) as Miriam "Midge" Maisel; Catherine O'Hara – Schitt's Creek (Pop TV) as Moira Rose
Outstanding Performance by an Ensemble in a Drama Series
**The Crown (Netflix) – Marion Bailey, Helena Bonham Carter, Olivia Colman, Charles Dance, Ben Daniels, Erin Doherty, Charles Edwards, Tobias Menzies, Josh O'Connor, Sam Phillips, David Rintoul, and Jason Watkins**; Big Little Lies (HBO) – Iain Armitage, Darby Camp, Cameron Crovetti, Nicholas Crovetti, Laura Dern, Martin Donovan, Merrin Dungey, Crystal Fox, Ivy George, Nicole Kidman, Zoë Kravitz, Kathryn Newton, Jeffrey Nordling, Denis O'Hare, Adam Scott, Alexander Skarsgård, Douglas Smith, Meryl Streep, James Tupper, Robin Weigert, Reese Witherspoon, and Shailene Woodley; Game of Thrones (HBO) – Alfie Allen, Pilou Asbæk, Jacob Anderson, John Bradley, Gwendoline Christie, Emilia Clarke, Nikolaj Coster-Waldau, Ben Crompton, Liam Cunningham, Joe Dempsie, Peter Dinklage, Richard Dormer, Nathalie Emmanuel, Jerome Flynn, Iain Glen, Kit Harington, Lena Headey, Isaac Hempstead Wright, Conleth Hill, Kristofer Hivju, Rory McCann, Hannah Murray, Staz Nair, Daniel Portman, Bella Ramsey, Richard Rycroft, Sophie Turner, Rupert Vansittart, and Maisie Williams; The Handmaid's Tale (Hulu) – Alexis Bledel, Madeline Brewer, Amanda Brugel, Ann Dowd, O. T. Fagbenle, Joseph Fiennes, Kristen Gutoskie, Nina Kiri, Ashleigh LaThrop, Elisabeth Moss, Yvonne Strahovski, Bahia Watson, Bradley Whitford, and Samira Wiley; Stranger Things (Netflix) – Millie Bobby Brown, Cara Buono, Jake Busey, Natalia Dyer, Cary Elwes, Priah Ferguson, Brett Gelman, David Harbour, Maya Hawke, Charlie Heaton, Andrey Ivchenko, Joe Keery, Gaten Matarazzo, Caleb McLaughlin, Dacre Montgomery, Michael Park, Francesca Reale, Winona Ryder, Noah Schnapp, Sadie Sink, and Finn Wolfhard
Outstanding Performance by an Ensemble in a Comedy Series
**The Marvelous Mrs. Maisel (Prime Video) – Caroline Aaron, Alex Borstein, Rachel Brosnahan, Marin Hinkle, Stephanie Hsu, Joel Johnstone, Jane Lynch, LeRoy McClain, Kevin Pollak, Tony Shalhoub, Matilda Szydagis, Brian Tarantina (posthumous), and Michael Zegen**; Barry (HBO) – Nikita Bogolyubov, Darrell Britt-Gibson, D'Arcy Carden, Andy Carey, Anthony Carrigan, Troy Caylak, Rightor Doyle, Patricia Fa'asua, Alejandro Furth, Sarah Goldberg, Nick Gracer, Bill Hader, Kirby Howell-Baptiste, Michael Irby, John Pirruccello, Stephen Root, and Henry Winkler; Fleabag (Prime Video) – Sian Clifford, Olivia Colman, Brett Gelman, Bill Paterson, Andrew Scott, and Phoebe Waller-Bridge; The Kominsky Method (Netflix) – Jenna Lyng Adams, Alan Arkin, Sarah Baker, Casey Thomas Brown, Michael Douglas, Lisa Edelstein, Paul Reiser, Graham Rogers, Jane Seymour, Melissa Tang, and Nancy Travis; Schitt's Creek (Pop TV) – Chris Elliott, Emily Hampshire, Daniel Levy, Eugene Levy, Sarah Levy, Dustin Milligan, Annie Murphy, Catherine O'Hara, Noah Reid, Jennifer Robertson, and Karen Robinson
Outstanding Performance by a Stunt Ensemble in a Television Series
**Game of Thrones (HBO)**; GLOW (Netflix); Stranger Things (Netflix); The Walking Dead (AMC); Watchmen (HBO)

=== Screen Actors Guild Life Achievement Award ===
- Robert De Niro

== Multiple nominations ==
=== Film ===
Nominations	Film
4	Bombshell
4	The Irishman
4	Once Upon a Time in Hollywood
3	Marriage Story
2	Ford v Ferrari
2	Jojo Rabbit
2	Joker

=== Television ===
Nominations	Program
4	The Marvelous Mrs. Maisel
3	The Crown
3	Fleabag
3	Game of Thrones
3	The Kominsky Method
3	The Morning Show
3	Stranger Things
2	The Act
2	Barry
2	Chernobyl
2	Fosse/Verdon
2	The Handmaid's Tale
2	Schitt's Creek

== Multiple wins ==
=== Television ===
Wins	Program
2	Fosse/Verdon
2	Game of Thrones
2	The Marvelous Mrs. Maisel

== In Memoriam ==
The segment honored the following who died in 2019:

- Tim Conway
- Georgia Engel
- Paul Benjamin
- Max Wright
- Phyllis Newman
- Kaye Ballard
- Kristoff St. John
- Ron Leibman
- Caroll Spinney
- Jan-Michael Vincent
- Ken Kercheval
- Diahann Carroll
- Luke Perry
- Verna Bloom
- Peggy Lipton
- Robert Blanche
- Michael J. Pollard
- Russi Taylor
- Bill Macy
- Dick Miller
- Shelley Morrison
- Seymour Cassel
- Arte Johnson
- Katherine Helmond
- Cameron Boyce
- Sue Lyon
- Rip Torn
- Brian Tarantina
- Buck Henry
- Peter Mayhew
- Danny Aiello
- Rutger Hauer
- Robert Forster
- Valerie Harper
- René Auberjonois
- John Witherspoon
- Doris Day
- Albert Finney
- Peter Fonda

== Presenters ==
The following individuals presented awards at the ceremony:

- Dan Levy and Eugene Levy with Outstanding Performance by a Male Actor in a Comedy Series
- Millie Bobby Brown and Jharrel Jerome with Outstanding Performance by a Female Actor in a Comedy Series
- Margaret Qualley, Bruce Dern, and Dakota Fanning introduced Once Upon a Time in Hollywood
- Jason Bateman with Outstanding Performance by an Ensemble in a Comedy Series
- Taron Egerton with Outstanding Performance by a Female Actor in a Supporting Role
- Song Kang-ho, Park So-dam, Choi Woo-shik, Lee Jung-eun, and Lee Sun-kyun introduced Parasite
- Jennifer Garner with Outstanding Performance by a Male Actor in a Supporting Role
- Sophie Turner and Pedro Pascal with Outstanding Performance by a Female Actor in a Television Movie or Miniseries
- Gabrielle Carteris presented SAG-AFTRA
- Gwendoline Christie
- Taika Waititi, Roman Griffin Davis, and Scarlett Johansson introduced Jojo Rabbit
- America Ferrera and Daveed Diggs with Outstanding Performance by a Female Actor in a Drama Series
- Leonardo DiCaprio presented SAG Life Achievement Award
- Steve Buscemi
- Lili Reinhart and Kaitlyn Dever with Outstanding Performance by a Male Actor in a Drama Series
- Anna Paquin, Ray Romano, and Harvey Keitel introduced The Irishman
- Phoebe Waller-Bridge with Outstanding Performance by an Ensemble in a Drama Series
- Nicole Kidman, Margot Robbie, and Charlize Theron introduced Bombshell
- Lupita Nyong'o and Danai Gurira with Outstanding Performance by a Male Actor in a Television Movie or Miniseries
- Sterling K. Brown presented "In Memoriam" segment
- Glenn Close with Outstanding Performance by a Male Actor in a Leading Role
- Tom Hanks with Outstanding Performance by a Female Actor in a Leading Role
- Dan Levy and Eugene Levy with Outstanding Performance by a Cast in a Motion Picture

== See also ==
- 24th Satellite Awards
- 25th Critics' Choice Awards
- 35th Independent Spirit Awards
- 40th Golden Raspberry Awards
- 47th Annie Awards
- 73rd British Academy Film Awards
- 77th Golden Globe Awards
- 92nd Academy Awards
