= Lemonade Blessing =

2025 film by Chris Merola

- Promotional release poster
- Directed by: Chris Merola
- Written by: Chris Merola
- Produced by: Samuel Ashurov; Chris Merola; Raza Rizvi; Aruba Sülzana
- Starring: Jake Ryan; Jeanine Serralles; Skye Alyssa Friedman; Miles J. Harvey
- Cinematography: Harrison Kraft
- Edited by: Edouard Fan; Abhineet Kumar
- Music by: Daniel Futcher
- Release date: June 5, 2025 (Tribeca Film Festival)
- Running time: 100 minutes
- Country: United States
- Language: English

Lemonade Blessing is a 2025 American coming-of-age comedy-drama film written, directed and co-produced by Chris Merola in his directorial debut. It stars Jake Ryan as John, whose recently divorced mother (Jeanine Serralles) enrolls him in a private Catholic high school, where he becomes smitten with a classmate (Skye Alyssa Friedman) who asks him to commit sacrilegious acts in order to continue their relationship.

Lemonade Blessing had its world premiere on June 5, 2025, at the Tribeca Film Festival in New York City.

== Cast ==
- Jake Ryan as John Santucci
- Jeanine Serralles as Mary Santucci
- Skye Alyssa Friedman as Lilith / Rachel
- Miles J. Harvey as Angelo
- Michael Oloyede as Brother Phil
- Todd Gearhart as Pete Santucci
- Barbara Rosenblat as Mrs. Groff

== Reception ==
On review aggregator website Rotten Tomatoes, the film has an approval rating of 100% based on 14 reviews, with an average rating of 7.6/10. In a review of the film for Screen Rant, Patrice Witherspoon complimented Merola's direction and wrote that, "Lemonade Blessing, while often an uncomfortable watch, breaks away from its tired genre tropes to yield a charming feature with excellent commentary on important themes." Peter Gray of The AU Review gave the film four out of five stars, praising the "undeniable charm and spark" of Ryan and Friedman, and calling Lemonade Blessing "a film to make teenagers feel better about their own skin and their curiosities, and for those of us that survived the cumbersome existence of such to reflect upon coming out the other side of it all."
