= Utopia (2020 TV series) =

American drama web television series

- Genre: Drama; Science fiction; Black comedy
- Created by: Gillian Flynn
- Based on: Utopia by Dennis Kelly
- Written by: Gillian Flynn
- Directed by: Toby Haynes; Susanna Fogel; Courtney Hunt; J. D. Dillard
- Starring: John Cusack; Ashleigh LaThrop; Dan Byrd; Desmin Borges; Jessica Rothe; Christopher Denham; Javon Walton; Farrah Mackenzie; Cory Michael Smith; Jeanine Serralles; Rainn Wilson; Sasha Lane
- Composer: Jeff Russo
- Country of origin: United States
- Original language: English
- No. of seasons: 1
- No. of episodes: 8

Production
- Executive producers: Gillian Flynn; Jessica Rhoades; Dennis Kelly; Karen Wilson; Diederick Santer; Sharon Hall; Sharon Levy; Toby Haynes
- Producer: Huey M. Park
- Cinematography: Shawn Kim; Stephen Pehrsson
- Editors: Scott Turner; Kyle Traynor; Lisa Bromwell; Jonathan Schwartz
- Running time: 44–55 minutes
- Production companies: Endemol Shine North America; Kudos; Trallume Productions; Picrow; Amazon Studios

Original release
- Network: Amazon Prime Video
- Release: September 25, 2020

Utopia is an American science fiction drama television series created by Gillian Flynn based on the 2013 British original series of the same name. It was released on September 25, 2020, on the Amazon Prime Video streaming service.

In November 2020, the series was canceled after one season of eight episodes.

== Premise ==
A group of young adults and a boy get hold of Utopia, a cult underground comic book, which not only pins them as the target of a shadowy organization, but also burdens them with the dangerous task of saving the world. The titular comic is the conclusion of Dystopia, of which the group members are fans and believe it to contain clairvoyant information about diseases that have already struck the world.

== Cast and characters ==
=== Main ===
- John Cusack as Kevin Christie
- Ashleigh LaThrop as Becky Todd
- Dan Byrd as Ian Ackerman
- Desmin Borges as Wilson Wilson
- Jessica Rothe as Samantha
- Christopher Denham as Arby / John Hyde
- Javon Walton as Grant Bishop
- Farrah Mackenzie as Alice
- Cory Michael Smith as Thomas Christie
- Jeanine Serralles as Colleen Stearns
- Rainn Wilson as Michael Stearns
- Sasha Lane as Jessica Hyde

=== Recurring ===
- Felisha Terrell as Hailey Alvez
- Fiona Dourif as Cara Frostfield
- Dustin Ingram as Tallman
- Michael B. Woods as Rod
- Crystal Fox as Kim
- Rebecca Spence as Laura Christie
- Sonja Sohn as Katherine Milner
- Tim Hopper as Dale Warwick
- Hadley Robinson as Charlotte and Lily
- Calum Worthy as Ethan

== Episodes ==
No.	Title	Directed by	Written by	Original release date
1	"Life Begins"	Toby Haynes	Gillian Flynn	September 25, 2020
2	"Just A Fanboy"	Toby Haynes	Gillian Flynn	September 25, 2020
3	"Tuesday's Child"	Toby Haynes	Gillian Flynn	September 25, 2020
4	"not slow not bad"	Susanna Fogel	Gillian Flynn	September 25, 2020
5	"Order 2472"	Susanna Fogel	Gillian Flynn	September 25, 2020
6	"Respect Your Purpose"	Courtney Hunt	Gillian Flynn	September 25, 2020
7	"Talking Hurts"	J. D. Dillard	Gillian Flynn	September 25, 2020
8	"Stay Alive, Jessica Hyde"	Toby Haynes	Gillian Flynn	September 25, 2020

== Production ==
=== Development ===
Utopia was ordered direct-to-series on April 19, 2018, with an order of nine episodes. It had originally been set up at HBO with David Fincher to direct, but was never produced after a financial dispute. On April 19, 2018, Utopia was ordered to series by Amazon. On July 23, 2020, during San Diego Comic-Con@Home, the first teaser for the series was released and was confirmed to be released in the fourth quarter of 2020. On August 6, 2020, at the TCA virtual panel, showrunner Gillian Flynn announced that there would be less violence than in the British original. The series was released on September 25, 2020. On November 27, 2020, Amazon canceled the series after one season.

=== Filming ===
In June 2018, it was announced the series would start filming by the fourth quarter of 2018. On August 8, 2018, it was announced the series would consist of nine episodes, and probably have three different directors at work, one every three episodes, although it was later confirmed that there would be eight episodes in the first season. Flynn stated, "It won’t have a single director the entire way through. I think we’ll probably have multiple directors. It’s nine episodes, so I think we’ll do it in blocks of three, three and three, and not one director, the whole time through."

On October 16, 2019, the creator of the show, Gillian Flynn, announced that the series' filming was completed.

On August 10, 2020, it was revealed that Jeff Russo would compose the music for the series.

=== Casting ===
During its initial development in 2015, the cast included Rooney Mara, Colm Feore, Eric McCormack, Dallas Roberts, Jason Ritter, Brandon Scott and Agyness Deyn.

In January 2019, Sasha Lane joined the cast of the series. In February 2019, Rainn Wilson, Dan Byrd, Cory Michael Smith, Ashleigh LaThrop, Desmin Borges, Farrah Mackenzie, and Christopher Denham joined the cast of the series. In April 2019, John Cusack and Jeanine Serralles joined the cast of the series. In May 2019, Jessica Rothe, Felisha Terrell and Dustin Ingram joined the cast in recurring roles.

== Reception ==
Many reviews from critics and audiences were critical of the poor timing of the release of the show with the COVID-19 pandemic, its level of violence, and negative comparisons to the original. Positive marks were given to the pacing and twists in the plot. On Rotten Tomatoes, the series holds an approval rating of 50% based on 46 reviews, with an average rating of 6/10. The site's critical consensus reads, "Utopia's cast and mystery at times transcend its overtly cynical and overly violent tendencies, but even those willing to look past the torture may find the whole thing too timely — in a bad way." On Metacritic, the series has a weighted average score of 56 out of 100 based on 19 reviews, indicating "mixed or average reviews".

== See also ==
- Antinatalism
- "Rat utopia"
- Konrad Lorenz
- Stand on Zanzibar
