= Cubby (film) =

- Film poster
- Directed by: Mark Blane; Ben Mankoff
- Written by: Mark Blane
- Produced by: Carolina Gimenez; Mark Blane
- Starring: Mark Blane; Patricia Richardson; Jeanine Serralles
- Cinematography: Sinisa Kukic
- Edited by: Max Ethan Miller
- Music by: Jon Natchez
- Distributed by: Breaking Glass Pictures
- Release date: April 25, 2019 (Torino Lovers Film Festival)
- Running time: 83 minutes
- Country: United States
- Language: English

Cubby is a 2019 American fantasy comedy-drama film directed by Mark Blane and Ben Mankoff and starring Blane, Patricia Richardson, Jeanine Serralles, Peter Y. Kim, and Joseph Seuffert.

== Cast ==
- Patricia Richardson as Peggy
- Mark Blane as Mark
- Jeanine Serralles as Annie
- Peter Y. Kim as Charles
- Rodney Richardson as Russell
- Joseph Seuffert as Milo
- Zachary Booth as S, the Art Gallery Receptionist
- Donna Mitchell as Cora
- Naian Gonzalez Norvind as Briahna
- Lucy DeVito as Alexis
- Matthew Shear as Lars

== Release ==
The world premiere was in International Film Competition at the oldest LGBTQ film festival in Europe, Torino Lovers Film Festival. The film played at the Outfest LA Film Festival on July 19, 2019.

=== Film festivals ===
- Lovers Film Festival – Torino LGBTQI Visions, Turin, Italy (April 2019)
- Frameline Film Festival (24 June 2019)
- Outfest, Los Angeles, US (July 2019)
- OUTshine Film Fest, Fort Lauderdale, United States (October 2019)
- NewFest, New York City, US (October 2019)
- Mostra Fire, Barcelona, Spain (June 2019)
- GAZE Film Festival, Dublin, Ireland (August 2019)
- Iris Prize, Cardiff, Wales (October 2019)
- Gender Bender, Bologna, Italy (September 2019)
- Faroe Islands International Minority Film Festival, Tórshavn, Denmark (October 2019)
- Inside Out, Toronto, Canada (May 2019)
- Reeling International Film Festival, Chicago, US (September 2019)
- Out on Film, Atlanta, USA (October 2019)
- Cinema Queer, Stockholm, Sweden (September 2019)
- Roze Filmdagen, Amsterdam, Netherlands (March 2021)
- Festival de Cine LGBTIQ - Asturias, Aviles, Spain (June 2020)

== Reception ==
The film has a 73% rating on Rotten Tomatoes. Norman Gidney of Film Threat awarded the film a 6 out of 10. He writes "It is clear that Blane was influenced by John Cameron Mitchell...he has Mitchell’s warm understanding and faith in the goodness of people in general."

Kimber Myers of the Los Angeles Times gave the film a positive review and wrote, "Directors Mark Blane and Ben Mankoff bring a kinky sweetness to this oddball dramedy, but audience's appetites for it will depend on their patience with its lead character."

Ben Kenigsberg of The New York Times gave the film a negative review and wrote, "Whatever charms the filmmakers envisioned are nowhere apparent in these 83 cringe-worthy minutes."

John Paul King of the Los Angeles Blade gave the film a positive review and concluded "Because in the end, that’s what makes “Cubby” – as well as its awkward hero – lovable in spite of itself. It's a film that is often infuriating and sometimes difficult to watch, but it has a voice of its own that is not quite like anything else you've ever seen – and there are very few films out there today, Indie or otherwise, that can lay claim to that."
