= Little Voice (TV series) =

American romantic comedy-drama television series

- Promotional poster
- Genre: Romantic comedy-drama
- Created by: Sara Bareilles; Jessie Nelson
- Starring: Brittany O'Grady; Sean Teale; Colton Ryan; Shalini Bathina; Kevin Valdez; Phillip Johnson Richardson
- Country of origin: United States
- Original language: English
- No. of seasons: 1
- No. of episodes: 9

Production
- Executive producers: Sara Bareilles; Jessie Nelson; J. J. Abrams; Ben Stephenson
- Running time: 30 minutes
- Production companies: Dear Hope Productions; Bad Robot Productions; Warner Bros. Television

Original release
- Network: Apple TV+
- Release: July 10 – August 21, 2020

Little Voice (also known as Her Voice in Europe) is an American romantic comedy-drama television series created by Sara Bareilles and Jessie Nelson for Apple TV+. The series premiered on July 10, 2020. In August 2021, the series was canceled after one season.

== Premise ==
Little Voice explores "the universal journey of finding your authentic voice in your early 20s. It is described as a fresh, intensely romantic tale of the search to find your true voice...and then the courage to use it."

== Cast ==
=== Main ===
- Brittany O'Grady as Bess Alice King
- Sean Teale as Ethan
- Colton Ryan as Samuel
- Shalini Bathina as Prisha
- Kevin Valdez as Louie King
- Phillip Johnson Richardson as Benny

=== Recurring ===
- Chuck Cooper as Percy King
- Nadia Mohebban as Ananya
- Sam Lazarus as Phil
- Mark Blane as Zack
- Andrew Duff as Ted
- Ned Eisenberg as Al
- Samrat Chakrabarti as Anil
- Gopal Divan as Sundeep
- Sakina Jaffrey as Vilina
- Luke Kirby as Jeremy
- June Squibb as Mrs. Daisy Finch
- Becky Ann Baker as Elaine

== Episodes ==
No.	Title	Directed by	Written by	Original release date
1	"I Don't Know"	Jessie Nelson	Story by : Sara Bareilles & Jessie Nelson; Teleplay by : Jessie Nelson	July 10, 2020
2	"I Will Survive"	Christopher Storer	Daniel Goldfarb	July 10, 2020
3	"Dear Hope"	Cherien Dabis	Suzanne Heathcote	July 10, 2020
4	"Love Hurts"	Jessie Nelson	Story by : Sara Bareilles & Jessica Lamour & Jessie Nelson; Teleplay by : Jessica Lamour & Jessie Nelson	July 17, 2020
5	"Quick, Quick Slow"	Emma Westenberg	Meghan Kennedy	July 24, 2020
6	"Tell Her"	Jessie Nelson	Karen Leigh Hopkins & Jessie Nelson	July 31, 2020
7	"Ghost Light"	Jessie Nelson	Meghan Kennedy & Cirocco Dunlap	August 7, 2020
8	"Sea Change"	Bart Freundlich	Meghan Kennedy & Jessie Nelson	August 14, 2020
9	"Sing What I Can't Say"	Jessie Nelson	Karen Leigh Hopkins, Jessie Nelson & Meghan Kennedy	August 21, 2020

== Production ==
=== Development ===
On June 6, 2018, it was announced that Apple had given the production a straight-to-series order for a first season consisting of ten episodes. The pilot episode was written and directed by Jessie Nelson, who would also executive produce alongside Sara Bareilles, J. J. Abrams, and Ben Stephenson. Along with Nelson, other directors for the series include Cherien Dabis, Bart Freundlich, Christopher Storer, and Emma Westenberg. Nelson was also expected to act as the series' showrunner, and Bareilles wrote original songs for the series. Production companies involved with the series include Warner Bros. Television and Bad Robot Productions. On August 4, 2021, Apple canceled the series after one season.

=== Casting ===
In October 2019, it was announced Brittany O'Grady, Shalini Bathina, Sean Teale, and Colton Ryan had joined the cast of the series as main cast members. At the same time, it was announced that Samrat Chakrabarti, Gopal Divan, Sakina Jaffrey, and Emma Hong would also be joining the cast. On May 21, 2020, it was announced that Kevin Valdez, Phillip Johnson Richardson, and Chuck Cooper would also star in the series.

== Release ==
On May 21, 2020, it was announced that the series would premiere on July 10, 2020. On June 12, 2020, the official trailer for the series was released.

== Reception ==
On review aggregator Rotten Tomatoes, Little Voice holds a 77% approval rating based on 30 reviews, with an average rating of 5.88/10. The website's critical consensus reads, "Little Voice's earnest tune is a little too familiar, but a winsome cast led by Brittany O'Grady and catchy music from Sara Bareilles make for a breezy summer binge." Metacritic gave the series a weighted average score of 60 out of 100 based on 18 reviews, indicating "mixed or average" reviews.

Carolyn Siede of The A.V. Club gave the first season a B− for some good and uplifting performances but a scattered performance by Brittany O'Grady and excessive storylines.

== Original soundtrack ==
More Love: Songs from Little Voice Season One is an album by American pop artist Sara Bareilles released on Epic Records on September 4, 2020. The release is also a soundtrack to the first season of Little Voice. The album is made up of recordings by Bareilles of the songs she recorded for the cast of the series. The album reached 32 in its one-week on Billboard's Album Sales chart on September 19.

=== Track listing ===
1. "I Don't Know Anything" (Bareilles) – 3:13
2. "More Love" (Jack Antonoff and Bareilles) – 3:50
3. "King of the Lost Boys" (Bareilles, Jason Blynn, Earl the Squirrel, and Peter William Harper) – 4:34
4. "Dear Hope" (Bareilles) – 4:22
5. "Ghost Light" (Bareilles) – 4:18
6. "Simple and True" (Bareilles) – 3:39
7. "Coming Back to You" (Bareilles) – 3:56
8. "In July" (Jack DeBose and Samora Pinderhughes) – 4:04
9. "Tell Her" (Bareilles, Hillary Lindsey, Lori McKenna, and Justin Trantor) – 4:58
10. "Little Voice" (Bareilles) – 4:24
