= Rebecca Cutter =

American writer, director and producer

Rebecca Perry Cutter
- Born: Cambridge, Massachusetts, USA
- Education: USC School of Cinematic Arts
- Occupations: Director, writer, producer
- Spouse: Ben Bell
- Children: 2

Rebecca Perry Cutter is an American producer, director and writer. She is best known for being the creator of Hightown and The Hunting Wives.

== Personal life and education ==
As a child she initially became interested in writing after eavesdropping on her mom's sessions (who was a social worker). She attended Wesleyan University, where she has earned a Bachelor’s with a double major in English and Women’s studies. In 2000 she moved to Los Angeles to attend USC School of Cinematic Arts where she has earned her M.F.A. in Production. She is married and has two daughters. She has been sober for 21 years.

== Career ==
In 2002 her short film Rancho Cucamonga which she wrote and directed was released. It was screened at First Look Film Festival in 2004.

She wrote and directed a thesis film called Eating which was shown at the 2005 Sundance Film Festival where it was well received by the judges.

In 2012 Cutter made her feature debut with Besties.

Cutter created, produced, directed and wrote the Starz series Hightown which premiered May 17, 2020. She began writing Hightown as a passion project while on hiatus from her job as writer on Gotham. Cutter had originally pursued writing for other people's shows rather than creating her own but her agents saw potential in her script: ''It was their belief in me that made this happen''. In 2022 she received the Outstanding Writer Drama Series Women's Image Network Award for the episode ''Great White''.

In 2025, The Hunting Wives premiered on Netflix where she serves as executive producer, and showrunner. The show was the most streamed series in the U.S from July 25 to July 31 (2025) accumulating over 2 billion minutes viewed. It was originally meant to premiere on Starz but that fell through after decoupling from Lionsgate Television.

== Filmography ==
Year	Title	Director	Executive producer	Writer	Notes
2002	Rancho Cucamonga	Yes	No	Yes	short
2005	Eating	Yes	No	Yes	short
2006	Grace	No	Yes	No	short
2012	Besties	Yes	No	Yes	
2012–2014	The Mentalist	No	No	Yes	Wrote 5 episodes
2014–2016	Gotham	No	Producer	Yes	Wrote 3 episodes
2016	Gotham Stories	No	No	Yes	Wrote 5 episodes
2018	Code Black	No	No	Yes	Wrote 1 episode: "Home Stays Home"
2020–2024	Hightown	Yes	Yes	Yes	Also showrunner and creator
2025	Boston Blue	No	Consulting	Yes	Wrote 1 episode: "History"
2025–present	The Hunting Wives	No	Yes	Yes	Also showrunner and creator
