= Mark Blane =

American actor and director (born 1988)

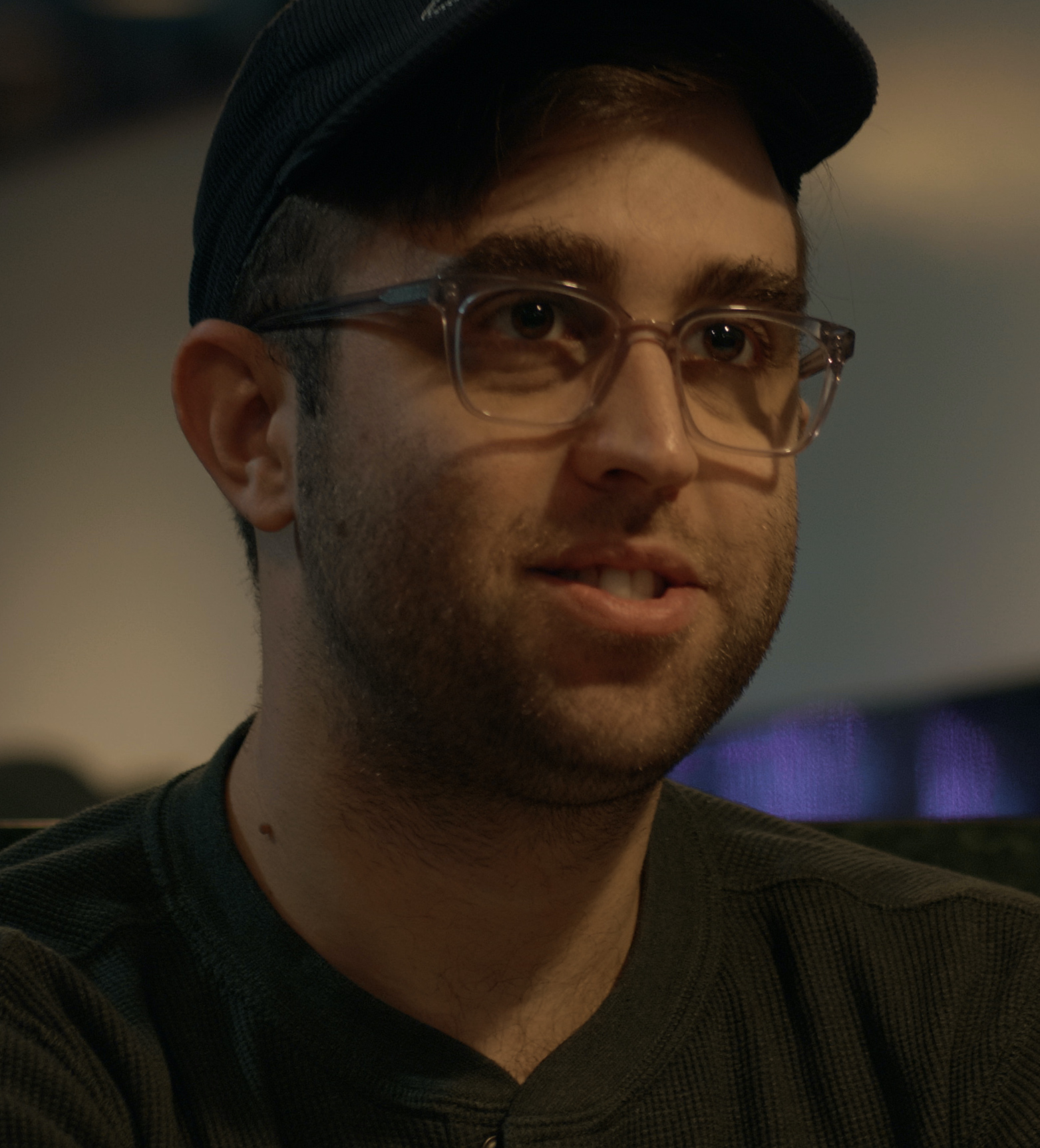
- Blane on set in Queens, New York in 2020
- Born: December 21, 1988 (age 36); Valparaiso, Indiana
- Occupation(s): Actor, writer, director, producer
- Years active: 2017–present

Mark Blane is an American actor, writer, and director. He is best known for his work on the film Cubby and his recurring role as "Zack" on the Apple TV+ series Little Voice.

== Life and career ==
Blane was born in Valparaiso, Indiana. His sister is the actress Carly Blane. He attended Valparaiso High School and Syracuse University. He began his film career as a co-writer on The Death and Life of Marsha P. Johnson. He is a playwright and author of The Rock and The Ripe: The Bullied and Bruised Gay Youth of America.

In 2019, Blane wrote and co-directed the feature film Cubby, along with Ben Mankoff, about a babysitter and a young boy trying to discover their place in New York City. The film had its World Premiere at the 34th Lovers Film Festival – Torino LGBTQI Visions and won Buried Treasure at the Chlotrudis Awards. His short film, Ghost Bike, starring Tamara Tunie, Mike Doyle and Carly Blane, was released on Apple in 2024.

== Filmography ==
Year	Title	Writer	Director	Producer	Note
2017	The Death and Life of Marsha P. Johnson	✓		✓	Documentary
2019	Cubby	✓	✓	✓	Feature Film
2023	Assassino Americano Amnésico	✓	✓	✓	Short Film
2024	Ghost Bike	✓	✓	✓	Short Film

As Actor

- 2019 - Cubby
- 2020 - Little Voice
- 2022 - The Apology
- 2023 - Assassino Americano Amnésico
- 2024 - Ghost Bike
