= Jake Ryan (American actor) =

American actor (born 2003)

- Ryan in 2023
- Occupation: Actor
- Years active: 2009–present

Jake Ryan is an American actor. He has appeared in the Wes Anderson films Moonrise Kingdom (2012) and Asteroid City (2023) as well as Bo Burnham's film Eighth Grade (2018) and Nasim Pedrad's sitcom Chad (2021–2024).

== Career ==
Ryan took up acting at age five as a hobby, which turned into a job. He made his film debut in the horror film The Innkeepers (2011). He began a long-running collaboration with the auteur filmmaker Wes Anderson at age seven when he was cast as a young camper in Moonrise Kingdom (2012), partly because he could play piano. In March 2012, an eight-year-old Ryan narrated, and got a writing credit on, a one-minute stop motion advertisement for Sony Mobile that was directed by Anderson. He also appeared in a promotional short for Moonrise Kingdom (opposite Jason Schwartzman) and in commentary for the Criterion Collection releases of Fantastic Mr. Fox and Moonrise Kingdom.

In the following years, Ryan had small parts in the Coen brothers' Inside Llewyn Davis (2013), Anderson's Isle of Dogs (2018), and the Safdie brothers' Uncut Gems (2019). In Bo Burnham's Eighth Grade (2018), he played a "scene-stealing" boy who takes the main character, Kayla, on a date over chicken nuggets and imitates Rick and Morty; the young actor found watching himself in the film cringeworthy. He began co-starring with Nasim Pedrad in the TBS sitcom Chad in April 2021.

In 2023, Ryan reunited with Anderson and Schwartzman in Asteroid City, playing the dual roles of awkward teenage brainiac Woodrow Steenbeck and an actor understudying for the part of Woodrow in a play.

== Personal life ==
Ryan was homeschooled in New York. He took improvisational comedy classes with the Upright Citizens Brigade in New York from age 15.

== Filmography ==
=== Film ===
Year(s)	Title	Role	Notes
2011	The Innkeepers	Young Boy	
2011	The Stand Up	Trevor	
2012	Moonrise Kingdom	Lionel	
2012	Cousin Ben Troop Screening with Jason Schwartzman	Khaki Scout	Short film
2013	Inside Llewyn Davis	Danny	
2015	No Letting Go	David	
2018	Eighth Grade	Gabe	
2018	Isle of Dogs	Junior Interpreter Ernie	Voice role
2018	Age of Summer	Woods	
2019	Uncut Gems	Dwarf 2	
2020	Youngest	Trevor	
2023	Asteroid City	Woodrow Steenbeck	
2025	Lemonade Blessing	John Santucci	

=== Television ===
Year(s)	Title	Role	Notes
2010	Sesame Street	Jake	Episode: "Saved by Superfoods"
2015	Ground Floor	Caleb	Episode: "The Proposal – Part One"
2015	Unbreakable Kimmy Schmidt	Boy	Episode: "Kimmy Gets a Job!"
2015	The Comedians	Adam	Episode: "Red, White & Working Blue"
2015	Friends of the People	Ethan	Episode: "Kings of Gold"
2018	Splitting Up Together	Nathaniel	2 episodes
2019	The Cool Kids	Ernie	Episode: "Mentors"
2021	Chad	Peter	7 episodes
