= Chad (TV series) =

American sitcom

- Genre: Sitcom
- Created by: Nasim Pedrad
- Starring: Nasim Pedrad; Jake Ryan; Saba Homayoon; Paul Chahidi; Ella Mika; Alexa Loo
- Composer: Joe Wong
- Country of origin: United States
- Original language: English
- No. of seasons: 2
- No. of episodes: 18

Production
- Executive producers: Nasim Pedrad; Oly Obst; Rhys Thomas; Hayes Davenport; Rob Rosell; Robert Padnick
- Producers: Chad Oakes; Michael Frislev; David Cress
- Production locations: Vancouver, British Columbia; Portland, Oregon
- Cinematography: Sam Goldie
- Editors: Jordan Kim; Heather Capps
- Camera setup: Single-camera
- Running time: 20–24 minutes
- Production companies: Shawdi Productions; Nomadic Pictures; 3 Arts Entertainment

Original release
- Network: TBS (season 1); The Roku Channel (season 2)
- Release: April 6, 2021 – January 19, 2024

Chad is an American television sitcom created by Nasim Pedrad, who also stars as the title role in the series. The series premiered on April 6, 2021 on TBS.

In February 2016, Chad was originally sold to Fox and ordered for a series in 2016 titled Chad: An American Boy with the original concept about a "14-year-old boy in the throes of adolescence who is tasked with being the man of the house", with the original pilot written by Pedrad and Rob Rosell. In August 2016, it was announced that the series would not be moving forward at Fox and would be shopped to other networks. In May 2019, the series was picked up by TBS for a 10-episode order. In May 2021, the series was renewed for a second season. In July 2022, TBS announced that while the second season of Chad had been filmed, that no third season would be ordered, along with the show being canceled hours before its premiere, as the channel was pivoting away from original scripted content.

On October 26, 2022, The Roku Channel acquired the series and aired the second season on January 19, 2024. While the series received mostly positive reviews from critics, it was widely panned by audiences but has since gained a cult following after its release. On May 7, 2024, The Roku Channel cancelled the series after the second season.

== Premise ==
Chad (Pedrad) is a 14-year-old Persian-American boy on a mission to become popular as he navigates his first year of high school. During the first season, Chad's friendships and sanity are pushed to the limits as he uses every tactic at his disposal to befriend the cool kids while enduring his mother's new dating life and reconciling with his cultural identity.

== Cast ==
=== Main ===
- Nasim Pedrad as Chad Amani
- Jake Ryan as Peter
- Saba Homayoon as Naz Amani
- Paul Chahidi as Hamid Amani
- Ella Mika as Niki Amani
- Alexa Loo as Denise

=== Recurring ===
- Madeleine Arthur as Marjorie
- Thomas Barbusca as Reid
- Phillip Mullings Jr. as Ikrimah
- Jarrad Paul as Charles
- Grayson Thorne Kilpatrick as Ethan

=== Guest ===
- Armani Jackson as Joey
- Lucius Hoyos as Raul
- Aidan Laprete as Kevin
- Kensington Tallman as Avery
- Lily Fisher as Margaret
- Houshang Touzie as Farhad
- Dave Ahdoot as Pasha
- Parviz Pedrad as Mohsen
- Aidan Fiske as Liam

== Episodes ==
Season	Episodes	Originally released		
Season	Episodes	First released	Last released	Network
1	8	April 6, 2021	May 25, 2021	TBS
2	10	January 19, 2024		The Roku Channel

=== Season 1 (2021) ===
No. overall	No. in season	Title	Directed by	Written by	Original release date	U.S. viewers (millions)
1	1	"Pilot"	Rhys Thomas	Story by : Nasim Pedrad & Rob Rosell; Teleplay by : Nasim Pedrad	April 6, 2021	0.71
2	2	"Sword"	Rhys Thomas	Nasim Pedrad	April 13, 2021	0.65
3	3	"Ikrimah Breakup"	LP	Dave King	April 20, 2021	0.58
When Chad finds Naz and Ikrimah in bed together, he finds a liking to Ikrimah as a father figure. Later, when Chad finds out that the two had broken up, he and his friend, Peter, go to Ikrimah's house.
4	4	"K-POP"	Jordan Kim	Caroline Goldfarb	April 27, 2021	0.61
Chad decides he needs to find his identity, so he joins an Asian Appreciation club at school with a group of other students. Music featured: "Dramarama" by Monsta X and "Close" by AB6IX
5	5	"Whiskey Slaps"	Paul Briganti	Joshua Corey & Brian Kratz	May 4, 2021	0.45
Chad is put to the test, when he is put in charge of Niki, and when he allows her to go to a party, he finds her and a group of friends drinking. He takes a drink at the party as well, and the two sneak home.
6	6	"Hamid"	Paul Briganti	Robert Padnick	May 11, 2021	0.53
Chad's uncle Hamid is visiting, and Chad is desperate to get some new shoes, specifically the new LeBrons. While waiting in line for the shoes, Chad tells Hamid to stay outside. When Chad goes into the shoe store to get the shoes, and he is ready to purchase them, he is told that he cannot purchase the shoes with Hamid's credit card, unless Hamid is present. Later, Chad, Hamid, and two other men, Farhad and Mohsen, go to a guy named Pasha from the Black Market to get the shoes. When Chad brings the shoes to school, Reid and his friends tell him the shoes are fake.
7	7	"Lakehouse"	LP	Lindsay Golder	May 18, 2021	0.56
8	8	"Finale"	Rhys Thomas	Nasim Pedrad	May 25, 2021	0.56

=== Season 2 (2024) ===
No. overall	No. in season	Title	Directed by	Written by	Original release date
9	1	"Class President"	Matt Sohn	Max Searle	January 19, 2024
10	2	"Mr. Worker"	Matt Sohn	Caroline Goldfarb	January 19, 2024
11	3	"Mona"	Matt Sohn	Nasim Pedrad	January 19, 2024
12	4	"Señor Doobs"	Molly McGlynn	John Howell Harris	January 19, 2024
13	5	"Third Wheel"	Nina Pedrad	Dave King	January 19, 2024
14	6	"The Dance"	Bill Benz	John Howell Harris	January 19, 2024
15	7	"New Brother"	Bill Benz	Kevin Etten	January 19, 2024
16	8	"Maman Bozorg"	Molly McGlynn	Lindsay Golder	January 19, 2024
17	9	"American Boy"	Todd Strauss-Schulson	Nasim Pedrad	January 19, 2024
18	10	"Class Trip"	Todd Strauss-Schulson	Nasim Pedrad	January 19, 2024

== Production ==
=== Development ===
On February 10, 2016, it was reported that a comedy starring Nasim Pedrad was given a pilot order at Fox. On August 5, 2016, it was announced that the idea would not be moving forward at Fox, and would be shopped elsewhere to broadcast, cable and streaming networks. On May 15, 2019, TBS gave Chad a series order, along with the first trailer of the series being released. On May 19, 2021, TBS renewed the series for a second season; which was scheduled to premiere on July 11, 2022. Instead, hours before the second season was scheduled to premiere, TBS canceled the series.

In October 2022, The Roku Channel acquired the series and premiered the second season on January 19, 2024. On May 7, 2024, The Roku Channel cancelled the series after the second season.

=== Filming ===
In 2021, the series relocated its production from British Columbia to California, to take advantage of tax incentives provided by the California Film Commission.

== Reception ==
=== Viewership ===
Chad debuted as the top-rated scripted cable program of 2021. The series premiere received 1.9 million viewers across two airings, with 765,000 viewers in the targeted 18-49 demographic.

=== Critical response ===
On review aggregator Rotten Tomatoes, the first seasons holds an approval rating of 81% based on 16 reviews, with an average rating of 7.80/10. The website's consensus reads, "Chad's caustic humor can be downright painful, but Nasim Pedrad's commitment to the bit gives this adolescent farce a heart." On Metacritic, the season has a 65 out of 100 based on 12 critics, indicating "generally favorable reviews".

=== Ratings ===
Viewership and ratings per episode of Chad
No.	Title	Air date	Rating (18–49)	Viewers (millions)	DVR (18–49)	DVR viewers (millions)	Total (18–49)	Total viewers (millions)
1	"Pilot"	April 6, 2021	0.2	0.71	—N/a	—N/a	—N/a	—N/a
2	"Sword"	April 13, 2021	0.2	0.65	0.1	0.18	0.3	0.83
3	"Ikrimah Breakup"	April 20, 2021	0.2	0.58	0.0	0.17	0.2	0.75
4	"K-POP"	April 27, 2021	0.2	0.61	TBD	TBD	TBD	TBD
5	"Whiskey Slaps"	May 4, 2021	0.1	0.45	TBD	TBD	TBD	TBD
6	"Hamid"	May 11, 2021	0.2	0.53	TBD	TBD	TBD	TBD
