= Hightown (TV series) =

2020 American crime drama television series

- Genre: Crime drama
- Created by: Rebecca Cutter
- Starring: Monica Raymund; Riley Voelkel; Shane Harper; Atkins Estimond; Amaury Nolasco; Dohn Norwood; James Badge Dale
- Music by: Dave Porter
- Opening theme: "Vacation" by The Textones
- Country of origin: United States
- Original language: English
- No. of seasons: 3
- No. of episodes: 25

Production
- Executive producers: Ellen H. Schwartz; Gary Lennon; KristieAnne Reed; Rebecca Cutter; Jonathan Littman; Jerry Bruckheimer; Tim Walsh
- Producers: James Oh; Jeremy Beim; Donna Bloom; Dale Williams; Monica Raymund; John Covarrubias; Lloyd Gilyard Jr.; Sharon Lopez
- Cinematography: Radium Cheung; Brian Rigney Hubbard; JB Smith; Derek Tindall
- Editors: Jason Hellmann; Plummy Tucker; Louis P. Bravo; Victoria C. Page; Yasmin Assemi; Christina P. Noel
- Running time: 54–59 minutes
- Production companies: Jerry Bruckheimer Television; Lionsgate Television

Original release
- Network: Starz
- Release: May 17, 2020 – March 8, 2024

Hightown is an American crime drama television series that premiered on Starz on May 17, 2020. The series was created by Rebecca Cutter and is executive produced by Cutter, Gary Lennon, Jerry Bruckheimer, Jonathan Littman, and KristieAnne Reed. It stars Monica Raymund and James Badge Dale.

In June 2020, the series was renewed for a second season which premiered on October 17, 2021. In March 2022, the series was renewed for a third season. The third and final season premiered on January 26, 2024.

== Premise ==
Jackie Quiñones is a National Marine Fisheries Service Agent in Provincetown, Massachusetts who abuses alcohol and drugs. She finds the body of a murdered woman, which launches an investigation by Detectives Alan Saintille and Ray Abruzzo into Cape Cod organized crime and the local opioid epidemic.

== Cast and characters ==
=== Main ===
- Monica Raymund as Jackie Quiñones, a National Marine Fisheries Service Agent in Provincetown, Massachusetts, who is a lesbian suffering from alcoholism, drug addiction, and obsessive behavior
- Riley Voelkel as Renee Segna, an exotic dancer at Xavier's Bar and Lounge and the fiancée of Frankie Cuevas Sr.
- Shane Harper as Junior McCarthy (season 1; guest season 2), a drug dealer and fisherman who is Jackie's friend
- Atkins Estimond as Osito Delgado, Frankie Cuevas Sr.'s ambitious lieutenant, who is running the criminal organization during Frankie's incarceration
- Amaury Nolasco as Frankie Cuevas Sr., a drug kingpin who is in jail and engaged to Renee
- Dohn Norwood as Alan Saintille, a trooper with the Massachusetts State Police assigned to the Cape Cod Interagency Narcotics Unit (CCINU)
- James Badge Dale as Ray Abruzzo, a Massachusetts State Police detective and Alan's partner, with a history of sex addiction

=== Recurring ===
- Rumi C. Jean-Louis as Frankie Cuevas Jr., Renee and Frankie Cuevas Sr.'s son
- Imani Lewis as Charmaine Grasa, niece of drug kingpin Wayne Grasa who takes over his empire after he goes to jail
- Mike Pniewski as Ed Murphy, Jackie's National Marine Fisheries Service partner, confidante, and mentor
- Ana Nogueira as Donna, Junior's on-and-off girlfriend with whom he has a child, and Renee's coworker at Xavier's
- Joy Suprano as Patricia, a sarcastic precinct clerk who works with Ray
- Kate Miller as Amanda Shaw, the local District Attorney
- Masha King as Sherry Henry (season 1), Ray's confidential informant, and the murder victim whose corpse is discovered by Jackie
- Crystal Lake Evans as Krista Collins (season 1), Sherry's best friend who witnesses her murder
- Edmund Donovan as Kizzle (season 1), an irresponsible criminal working for Osito
- Michael Mulheren as Lt. Velekee (season 1), Ray's disgruntled boss approaching retirement
- Gia Crovatin as Devonne Wilson (seasons 1–2), Jackie's ex-girlfriend
- Tonya Glanz as Trooper Leslie Babcock (seasons 1–2, guest season 3), Ray's old Massachusetts State Police partner whom he had an affair with and Jackie's Massachusetts State Police partner, becoming involved with Jackie in the second season
- Luis Guzmán as Jorge Cuevas (season 2), Frankie's cousin who mistrusts Renee
- Jona Xiao as Daisy (season 2), an exotic dancer who dates Jorge
- Charline St. Charles as Henriette (season 2)
- Crystal Lee Brown (season 2) and Taja V. Simpson (season 3) as Janelle, Osito's no-nonsense physical therapist at the Provincetown prison and romantic interest
- Carlos Gomez as Rafael (season 2), Jackie's neglectful, drug addict father
- Cecil Blutcher as Vernon (seasons 2–3), Osito's cocky but intelligent cellmate
- Dominic L. Santana as Chuleta (seasons 2–3), Frankie's muscle
- Barbara Weetman as Callie (seasons 2–3), Renee's overbearing mother
- Mark Boone Junior as Petey (seasons 2–3), Jackie's dealer
- Garret Dillahunt as Shane Frawley (season 3), a Boston gangster who comes to Provincetown and feuds with Osito
- Michael Drayer as Owen Frawley (season 3), Shane's impulsive, loose cannon nephew
- Jeanine Serralles as Rachel (season 3), a lonely woman who lives with her grandmother and finds comfort in writing letters to Frankie
- Kaya Rosenthal as Sarah (season 3), a young rookie undercover narcotics officer working with Ray
- Ellie Barone as Veronica (season 3), a tough working girl who goes missing after a drunken night with Jackie, and becomes her latest obsession

== Episodes ==
=== Series overview ===
Season	Episodes	Originally released	
Season	Episodes	First released	Last released
1	8	May 17, 2020	July 12, 2020
2	10	October 17, 2021	December 26, 2021
3	7	January 26, 2024	March 8, 2024

=== Season 1 (2020) ===
No. overall	No. in season	Title	Directed by	Written by	Original release date	U.S. viewers (millions)
1	1	"Love You Like a Sister"	Rachel Morrison	Rebecca Cutter	May 17, 2020 (Note: "Love You Like a Sister" was first released online and on the Starz App on May 10, 2020, ahead of its broadcast on television.)	0.224
Sherry Henry and her recently-sober friend Krista Collins drive to a remote part of Cape Cod at night to buy drugs. While Krista is relieving herself nearby, Osito arrives to meet Sherry; as soon as she identifies herself he murders her. Osito and his partner leave with Sherry's body but without seeing Krista, who is hiding. After a night of partying and sleeping with a tourist in her hotel room, Jackie takes a walk on the beach in the morning and comes across Sherry's body, which had been dumped in the ocean. State Police detectives Ray and Alan become involved because Sherry had been Ray's Confidential Informant in a case he is building against local drug kingpin Frankie Cuevas Sr. Ray confronts Frankie, who denies any involvement. Ray questions Renee, Frankie's girlfriend and the mother of his child, and obtains a physical description of Osito. Disturbed by what she has seen, Jackie goes out partying and crashes her car on her way home, injuring the woman she was taking with her. Bailed out of jail by her partner from work, Jackie is told she is facing a felony DUI charge and that going to rehab may help her case. She checks into a local drug rehab center. Junior is cleaning his fishing boat, and sweeps away some of Sherry's fake fingernails.
2	2	"Severely Weatherbeaten"	Rachel Morrison	Teleplay by : Rebecca Cutter; Story by : Rebecca Cutter & Gary Lennon	May 24, 2020	0.228
Jackie struggles adapting in rehab. While she is there, she sees a picture of Krista, a former patient, wearing a matching necklace that was found on Sherry's body. She attempts to find more information about her, and checks herself out of rehab in order to find her. Ray sends Renee and Leslie, an undercover cop, to meet with Osito, who becomes suspicious and leaves them. Ray retrieves Osito's trash and collects his fingerprints. Junior meets with Frankie in prison and unsuccessfully tries to quit working for him; he reveals that he was the one who dumped Sherry's body in the water.
3	3	"Rebellion Dogs"	Michael Offer	Ryan Farley	May 31, 2020	0.231
Jackie goes to court to try and get her felony DUI reduced to a misdemeanor, but the judge upholds the felony. She has Junior drive her to meet Lisa, who previously denied knowing Krista despite wearing her earrings. Junior, despite being sober, purchased heroin and offers it to Lisa in exchange for information about Krista. Lisa gives them Krista's suitcase, but that doesn't provide any evidence to help Jackie find her. Jackie checks herself back into rehab to find more information about Krista, and finds that she likely went to visit Anthony in Wareham. Jackie reconnects with her ex-girlfriend, Devonne, and manipulates Devonne to lend out her car so that Jackie can go meet Krista. Ray unsuccessfully attempts to find Osito, and investigates Sherry's old house. He sees a man, Ethan, leave. Ethan crashes his car after overdosing, and Ray revives him and turns him into an informant. Osito meets with Junior and takes him for a drive; he tells Junior that Frankie had asked Osito to kill Junior. Osito takes Junior to Remy's, his favorite fast food restaurant, and forces him to assault an employee there to prove his dedication. Frankie convinces Renee to get closer to Ray to find out information about his operation, and she seduces Ray.
4	4	"BFO"	Michael Offer	John Covarrubias	June 7, 2020	0.228
Ray convinces Ethan to help him meet Kizzle, a dealer with ties to Osito. After arresting and interrogating Kizzle, Ray assaults him, forcing Alan to take him out of the room. Jackie travels to Wareham and meets with Anthony. Anthony threatens her and attacks Devonne's car, but Jackie threatens to reveal Anthony's affair to his wife unless he gives her Krista's whereabouts. Jackie travels to the hotel where Krista is staying and leaves a note for Krista to call her. She returns to Provincetown and reconnects with Devonne. Jackie is then asked to take part in a big operation, in which she successfully helps apprehend several illegal fishermen. Jackie celebrates at the bar to celebrate the operation, where she ends her sobriety.
5	5	"The Best You'll Feel All Day"	Eagle Egilsson	Jordan Harper	June 14, 2020	0.179
Jackie wakes up after a night of partying to find that her phone is soaked and needs to be dried off. She soaks it in rice in anticipation of receiving a phone call from Krista. Jackie returns to her old life of drinking and drugs. She meets Devonne for their scheduled date, and Devonne realizes that Jackie hasn't changed and leaves. Jackie meets with friends and tells them about Krista; they decide to catch a taxi to travel to Wareham to get her, but their driver kicks them out when they are drinking and smoking in the car. Osito and Junior meet with Frankie in prison, and he informs them that they must kill Krista to remove any witnesses to Sherry's murder. Osito and Junior travel to New Bedford to buy fentanyl from Cape Verdean gangmembers with the intent of making Krista's death appear to be an overdose. Junior poses as a drug dealer and tries to have Krista inject the fentanyl, which he claims is less-potent heroin. When she refuses, Osito enters the room and beats Krista to death with a clothes iron. The next morning, Jackie wakes up to find that her phone has dried off and has a message from Krista. She calls back, only to be answered by Ray, who is investigating Krista's murder.
6	6	"The White Whale"	Eagle Egilsson	Molly Manning	June 21, 2020	0.219
Jackie meets with Ray following Krista's murder, and learns that he believes that Frankie is ordering these killings from prison. She goes to the strip club to meet Renee, and then travels to jail where Frankie is being held to meet with him. Osito decides to begin selling drugs without Frankie, and meets with the New Bedford gangmembers; he enlists Junior to sell drugs on Cape Cod. Ray and Leslie interrogate Scott, a witness to Krista's murder, and learn that he is an accomplice of Osito. Ray and Alan decide to bring Osito in for questioning, but he refuses to speak until his lawyer arrives. Jackie requests that Ron, a fellow agent, run a report to determine which boats were out the night of Sherry's murder. She sees that Junior's boat left Provincetown, arrived in Truro, and returned to Provincetown again that night.
7	7	"Everybody's Got a Cousin in Miami"	David Rodriguez	Cortney Norris	June 28, 2020	0.248
Frankie attempts to eliminate any witnesses, and orders the murder of Scott and Junior. Scott is murdered in prison, while Kizzle and Osito search for Junior. Jackie investigates Junior's boat and sees that the trip the night of Sherry's murder was not in the boat's logbook, but had occurred according to the boat's transponder. Jackie visits Junior, who tells her to leave once Osito and Kizzle show up. Kizzle and Osito take Junior to the woods, and appear ready to murder him, until Osito kills Kizzle instead. Osito helps eliminate evidence and gets a ticket for Junior to travel to Miami. Jackie, fearing for Junior, contacts Ray and gives him the vehicle info for Osito, which leads them to the Wayne, who helped Osito destroy evidence and get a bus ticket. Jackie and Ray stop the bus to search for Junior, but find he is not on it. A boy in a bathroom opens a stall door to find Junior unresponsive after injecting heroin.
8	8	"#Blessed"	David Rodriguez	Rebecca Cutter	July 12, 2020	0.330
Junior is pronounced dead after overdosing on carfentanil. Jackie is distraught over his death and relapses. Ray arranges a raid on a house of Osito's suppliers, and brings Jackie along. She sees Osito approaching, and the two shoot each other. Jackie recovers, and Alan clears her DUI conviction. Osito is recovering in the hospital, and Alan offers to strike a deal with him. Ray is suspended for forming a relationship with Renee, and Frankie is released from jail.

=== Season 2 (2021) ===
No. overall	No. in season	Title	Directed by	Written by	Original release date	U.S. viewers (millions)
9	1	"Great White"	Rachel Morrison	Rebecca Cutter	October 17, 2021	0.180
10	2	"Girl Power"	Rachel Morrison	Scott Wolven & Tim Walsh	October 24, 2021	0.144
11	3	"Fresh as a Daisy"	Monica Raymund	Cortney Norris	October 31, 2021	0.176
12	4	"Daddy Issues"	Radium Cheung	John Covarrubias	November 7, 2021	0.139
13	5	"Dot Dot Dot"	Eagle Egilsson	Lloyd Gilyard Jr.	November 14, 2021	0.179
14	6	"Behind Every Skirt is a Slip"	Eagle Egilsson	Molly Manning	November 28, 2021	0.258
15	7	"Crack is Wack"	Rebecca Cutter	Tim Walsh & Sarah Berry	December 5, 2021	0.260
16	8	"Houston, We Have a Problem"	Antonio Negret	Mae Smith & Kayla Westergard-Dobson	December 12, 2021	0.228
17	9	"Small Craft Warning"	Antonio Negret	Gary Lennon	December 19, 2021	0.260
18	10	"Fool Me Twice"	Brandon Sonnier	Rebecca Cutter	December 26, 2021	0.226

=== Season 3 (2024) ===
No. overall	No. in season	Title	Directed by	Written by	Original release date	U.S. viewers (millions)
19	1	"Good Times"	Eagle Egilsson	Rebecca Cutter	January 26, 2024	N/A
Jackie wakes up on a beach, having passed out the night before, and is unable to locate her car or cell phone. Owen Frawley, a local drug dealer that trades with Osito, murders a woman who is encroaching on his territory. Ray and Renee, who now have an infant daughter Scarlet, are living together; Renee is unhappy and isolated while Ray is obsessed with work. Frankie is in prison, having sustained an abdominal stab wound. Ray is leading a task force, which Jackie is a part of, to apprehend Owen. Renee, bored at home, applies to manage the strippers at her old club. Ray bypasses his chain of command to organize a sudden raid on a drug dealer's house; Jackie, drunk and high, goes on the raid and successfully apprehends the dealer. Jackie gets a call about her missing car; when she arrives, she finds a blood-soaked t-shirt of a woman that she had sex with.
20	2	"I Said No, No, No"	Eagle Egilsson	Tim Walsh	February 2, 2024	N/A
Jackie fails a drug test for marijuana and is relieved from the task force. She learns that the woman she had sex with, Veronica, is a prostitute, and attempts to contact her through another prostitute. Ray takes Sarah, a young officer, to attempt to buy drugs, but needs to rescue her. Osito is unable to supply drugs, and accuses Owen Frawley of encroaching on his territory. Renee finds success working at Xavier's, and has her mother babysit for her children. Rachel, an illicit girlfriend of Frankie Sr, masquerades as a professional nanny and offers to babysit Renee's children.
21	3	"Fall Brook"	Monica Raymund	Jordan Harper	February 9, 2024	N/A
Jackie attempts to find Veronica, and learns that she had stolen recently from a man who threatened to kill her. While investigating, Jackie is attacked by the same man and told to leave. Ray takes Sarah undercover to a party, and she starts a relationship with Owen to try and get information. Osito burns down Owen's drug stash in an attempt to start a drug war. Renee leaves Rachel to babysit for her children, and Rachel begins looking through Renee's possessions. Renee begins selling cocaine out of Xavier's. Jackie goes to find Petey, her drug dealer, and finds him murdered in his house.
22	4	"Jackpot"	Radium Cheung	John Covarrubias	February 16, 2024	N/A
Jackie reports Petey's death, and is questioned on why she was at his house. She attempts to find Veronica, assuming she is dead, but finds her alive and that she blames Jackie for hurting her. She confesses to Ed that she has been using drugs again, and he takes her to treatment. Ray is concerned for Sarah's well-being, but she insists that she is able to make good decisions for the sake of the investigation. Ray intends to take her to Shane's house, but they stop to have sex. Rachel steals $20,000 in cash from Renee, causing her to panic. Owen cancels his plans with Sarah and attacks Osito, shooting him in the eye before Red, his driver, is killed and he flees.
23	5	"29 Days Later"	Laura Belsey	Lloyd Gilyard Jr.	February 23, 2024	N/A
Jackie is almost out of her sober home, and meets with Ray to discuss how her drug abuse harmed their relationship. Osito, having lost his left eye after being shot by Owen, is recovering in the hospital. Ray continues to cheat on Renee with Sarah, and pushes her to reach out to Owen. Frankie is released from prison, and Vernon is killed as soon as he leaves. Owen is hiding on a boat, but plans to return for Red's memorial. He meets with Shane, who tells him not to attend. Frankie confronts Renee at Xavier's, but becomes enraged when Rachel disobeys his order to stay behind in the car. Ray ignores Renee while Jackie and Sarah are undercover for Red's memorial, which Owen does not attend. The group goes back to the police station, where Renee confronts Ray. He admits that he had sex with Sarah, and she forgives him. Osito tells Janelle that he will never give up his current life, and she leaves him. Osito flies to Tampa, where he is picked up by Charmaine.
24	6	"Chekhov's Gun"	Jason Hellmann	Molly Manning	March 1, 2024	N/A
While in hiding, Owen meets up with Sarah, but is pulled over. He kills the cop who had pulled him over, shoots Sarah, and flees. Sarah survives, and Owen flees the police. He meets with Shane, who reluctantly kills him and leaves his body for the cops to find. In Tampa, Osito and Charmaine work their way into the local drug scene and recommend expanding into the Cape Cod market. Osito returns to Cape Cod and meets with Shane, who agrees to work together. Jackie, still looking to investigate a murder in Fall Brook, meets with a local police officer, Officer Dolan. While in his house, he sees that he has a musket that previously belonged to Petey, but she is caught by Dolan. State police raid Xavier's, but are unable to find any evidence of Jorge's murder. Alan finds one of the cleaners, Chanice Bailey, who provides evidence against Renee. Ray realizes that Renee is in trouble, and instructs her to sell her remaining cocaine.
25	7	"Big Fish"	Rebecca Cutter	Rebecca Cutter	March 8, 2024	N/A
Dolan attacks Jackie, but she manages to subdue him and the police come and take him. Ray befriends Cooper and learns the whereabouts of Chanice; Renee finds her and bribes her to leave. Alan believes Ray is covering for Renee and confronts him. Jackie meets with Veronica and learns there is systemic corruption in the Fall Brook police department, but her complaints to the district attorney do not result in any action. Frankie goes to Renee's house and insists that she will be going to jail soon. Shane tries to improve his operations by hiring Osito and Frankie to work with him. They meet for dinner and reluctantly agree to work together. After the dinner, Ray shoots and kills Frankie. Ray claims ignorance regarding Frankie's death, but Alan and Jackie are suspicious of him. Jackie and Alan join the state police internal affairs division, and Ray receives a call from Osito, who tells him that he knows that Ray killed Frankie and expects Ray to work with him. Jackie and Ed go fishing, and Jackie hooks a large fish.

== Production ==
=== Development ===
By November 27, 2017, Starz had put the production, then titled P-Town, into development. The series was created by Rebecca Cutter, with Gary Lennon as showrunner and both serving executive producers alongside Jerry Bruckheimer, Jonathan Littman, and KristieAnne Reed. Production companies involved with the series were slated to consist of Jerry Bruckheimer Television. By November 26, 2018, Starz had given the production, now titled Hightown, a series order. On February 5, 2019, it was announced that Rachel Morrison would serve as director for the series. On June 11, 2020, Starz renewed the series for a second season. More recently, the creator signed a deal with Lionsgate Television. On March 1, 2022, Starz renewed the series for a third and final season.

=== Casting ===
On September 14, 2018, Monica Raymund had been cast in a leading role in the pilot. On January 9, 2019, James Badge Dale and Riley Voelkel had joined the main cast. In February 2019, Shane Harper, Atkins Estimond, Amaury Nolasco, and Dohn Norwood had been cast in the series in starring roles. On November 19, 2020, Luis Guzmán was cast in a recurring role for the second season. On December 16, 2020, Crystal Lee Brown, Cecil Blutcher, Carlos Gomez, and Barbara Weetman joined the cast in recurring capacities for the second season. On June 15, 2022, Garret Dillahunt, Jeanine Serralles, Kaya Rosenthal, Michael Drayer, Ellie Barone, and Taja V. Simpson were cast in recurring roles for the third season.

=== Filming ===
Principal photography for the series was scheduled to commence in March 2019. The Provincetown, Massachusetts, Select Board voted on April 29, 2019, to allow filming from May 20 to June 11 at locations including MacMillan Pier and the harbor, the West End rotary, and Provincetown Inn. Commercial Street between Standish and Ryder streets was scheduled to be closed for part of June 4 in order to recreate a Carnival parade scene. Production for the second season began on November 19, 2020, and concluded on April 2, 2021. Starting in season two the show's production moved to Wilmington, North Carolina. Production on season 3 started in May 2022 and wrapped at the end of July.

== Release ==
Hightown premiered on Starz on May 17, 2020. The second season premiered on October 17, 2021. The third and final season premiered on January 26, 2024. The series was quietly removed on Starz after the series ended in 2024. All three seasons became available to stream on Netflix on July 23, 2025.

== Reception ==
=== Critical response ===
On Rotten Tomatoes, the series holds an approval rating of 80% based on 20 reviews with an average rating of 6.07/10. The website's critical consensus reads, "Monica Raymund's charms rise above any formulaic tendencies in Hightown's highly entertaining first season. On Metacritic, the series has a weighted average score of 62 out of 100, based on 8 critics, indicating "generally favorable reviews".

=== Ratings ===
==== Season 1 ====
Viewership and ratings per episode of Hightown
No.	Title	Air date	Rating (18–49)	Viewers (millions)
1	"Love You Like A Sister"	May 17, 2020	0.03	0.224
2	"Severely Weatherbeaten"	May 24, 2020	0.03	0.228
3	"Rebellion Dogs"	May 31, 2020	0.03	0.231
4	"BFO"	June 7, 2020	0.03	0.228
5	"The Best You'll Feel All Day"	June 14, 2020	0.02	0.179
6	"The White Whale"	June 21, 2020	0.02	0.219
7	"Everybody's got a Cousin in Miami"	June 28, 2020	0.04	0.248
8	"#Blessed"	July 12, 2020	0.07	0.330

==== Season 2 ====
Viewership and ratings per episode of Hightown
No.	Title	Air date	Rating (18–49)	Viewers (millions)
1	"Great White"	October 17, 2021	0.04	0.180
2	"Girl Power"	October 24, 2021	0.04	0.144
3	"Fresh as a Daisy"	October 31, 2021	0.04	0.176
4	"Daddy Issues"	November 7, 2021	0.02	0.139
5	"Dot Dot Dot"	November 14, 2021	0.04	0.179
6	"Behind Every Skirt is a Slip"	November 28, 2021	0.06	0.258
7	"Crack is Wack"	December 5, 2021	0.03	0.260
8	"Houston, We Have a Problem"	December 12, 2021	0.04	0.228
9	"Small Craft Warning"	December 19, 2021	0.03	0.260
10	"Fool Me Twice"	December 26, 2021	0.03	0.226
