= The Hunting Wives =

American drama television series

- Genre: Drama
- Created by: Rebecca Cutter
- Based on: The Hunting Wives by May Cobb
- Showrunner: Rebecca Cutter
- Starring: Brittany Snow; Malin Åkerman; Evan Jonigkeit; Katie Lowes; George Ferrier; Dermot Mulroney; Jaime Ray Newman; Chrissy Metz; Hunter Emery; Karen Rodriguez
- Music by: Jeff Danna
- Opening theme: "King of Possibilities" by Goldie Boutilier
- Country of origin: United States
- Original language: English
- No. of seasons: 1
- No. of episodes: 8

Production
- Executive producers: Rebecca Cutter; Erwin Stoff; Julie Anne Robinson; May Cobb
- Producers: Joan Cunningham; Jeremy Beim
- Cinematography: Richard Rutkowski; Michał Sobociński; Bryce Fortner
- Editors: Jason Hellmann; Sarah C. Reeves; Erick Ferrerman; Christina Noel; Louis P. Bravo
- Running time: 46–55 minutes
- Production companies: Pleasingly Pulp; 3 Arts Entertainment; Lionsgate Television

Original release
- Network: Netflix
- Release: July 21, 2025 – present

The Hunting Wives is an American drama television series based on the novel of the same name by May Cobb. It stars Brittany Snow, Malin Åkerman, Evan Jonigkeit, Katie Lowes, George Ferrier, Dermot Mulroney, Jaime Ray Newman, and Chrissy Metz. The series premiered on Netflix on July 21, 2025. In September 2025, the series was renewed for a second season which is set to premiere on November 26, 2026. In October 2026, ahead of the second season premiere, the series was renewed for a third season.

== Premise ==
Sophie, a wife and mother who moves from Massachusetts to the fictional East Texas town of Maple Brook with her husband, Graham, is drawn into the glamorous, dangerous world of a socialite named Margo and her elite clique, the "Hunting Wives". As Sophie gets closer to Margo, she becomes entangled in a web of obsession, secrets, and ultimately murder, when a teenage girl, Abby, is found dead in the woods where the Hunting Wives meet.

== Cast and characters ==
=== Main ===
- Brittany Snow as Sophie O'Neil, a newcomer from Cambridge, Massachusetts, who recently moved with her husband to Maple Brook, Texas, after she killed a pedestrian in Cambridge while driving under the influence, and becomes captivated with Margo, the wife of her husband's boss
- Malin Åkerman as Margo Banks, the leader of an elite socialite group of wives known as the Hunting Wives, who takes an interest in Sophie
- Evan Jonigkeit as Graham O'Neil, Sophie's husband, an architect
- Katie Lowes as Jill, Brad's mother, the wife of Reverend Clint, and a member of the Hunting Wives
- George Ferrier as Brad, Jill's teenage son
- Dermot Mulroney as Jed Banks, Margo's older, wealthy husband and Graham's boss, who is an oil tycoon and Texas gubernatorial candidate
- Jaime Ray Newman as Callie, the number two of the Hunting Wives and the town sheriff's wife
- Chrissy Metz as Starr, a working-class single mother who is not part of the elite socialite group. Her daughter, Abby, is dating Brad
- Hunter Emery as Deputy Walter Flynn (season 2; recurring season 1), a Sheriff's Department officer who is investigating the murder of Abby with his partner, Deputy Salazar
- Karen Rodriguez as Deputy Wanda Salazar (season 2; recurring season 1), Deputy Flynn's partner at the Sheriff's Department, who is investigating the murder of Abby with him

=== Recurring ===
- Chosen Jacobs as Jamie, Brad's friend
- Branton Box as Sheriff Jonny, Callie's husband
- Madison Wolfe as Abby, Brad's girlfriend and Starr's teenage daughter
- Jason Davis as Reverend Clint, Jill's husband, Brad's father, and the megachurch Holy Horizon's reverend
- Michael Aaron Milligan as Kyle, Margo's brother, who lives in a trailer in Alba, Texas
- Abigail Rhyne as Nina, Abby's friend who is a teen mother
- Paul Teal as Pastor Pete, Holy Horizon's youth pastor
- Jackie Dallas as Jia-yi, Jed Banks' campaign manager.
- Kim Matula as Nadia Kelly (season 2)
- Alex Fitzalan as Lincoln Trout (season 2)
- John Stamos as Chase Brylan (season 2)
- Cam Gigandet as Gentle John Moffitt (season 2)
- Dale Dickey as Zelda Moffitt (season 2)
- Angel Reese as Trainer Barbie (season 2)
- Casey Mills as Nico (season 2)

== Episodes ==
=== Series overview ===
Series overview
Season	Episodes	Originally released
1	8	July 21, 2025
2	8	November 26, 2026

=== Season 1 (2025) ===
No. overall	No. in season	Title	Directed by	Written by	Original release date
1	1	"Strange and Unfamiliar Places"	Julie Anne Robinson	Rebecca Cutter	July 21, 2025
Sophie and Graham move to Maple Brook, Texas, and attend an NRA fundraiser hosted by Jed, Graham's boss. Sophie has an unusual first encounter with Margo, Jed's wife, and takes an unexpected liking to her. At the party, Reverend Clint's son, Brad, and his girlfriend, Abby, start to have sex before Abby stops them, and Margo sees them, and she locks eyes with Brad before closing the door. Margo and Jed discuss that they both have taken an interest in Sophie. Margo and her girl friends invite Sophie to join them for a Friday hangout, which starts with drinking and skeet shooting and turns into a night out dancing. Margo behaves suggestively with Sophie, which makes Sophie curious, but disturbs Margo's close friend Callie. Brad's mother, Jill, expresses disapproval with his relationship with Abby. While out on the town, a one-eyed man confronts Margo and calls her Mandy. At the end of the night, Margo tells her about her brother Kyle. She asks why Sophie doesn't drink or drive, and Sophie reveals Graham mandated that she not drink or drive herself anymore after a DUI incident. Margo helps Sophie loosen up with some drinking and driving before taking her home.
2	2	"Knockin' Boots"	Julie Anne Robinson	Rebecca Cutter	July 21, 2025
As Jed decides to run for governor, Margo works overtime to keep their secrets hidden, including paying off Kyle and ending her secret relationship with Callie. At a couple's dinner with Sophie, Margo, Graham, and Jed, Jed makes a pass at Sophie, and Margo tells Sophie about their marital arrangement that they can both sleep with other women. Jed and Margo allow themselves to continue their arrangement with discretion. Sophie begins to realize her feelings for Margo. A jealous and suspicious Callie uncovers Sophie's past life in Boston through her husband, Jonny, the Sheriff. Abby navigates her rocky relationship with Brad and is suspicious of his connection with Margo. Meanwhile, Sophie tries to take a day for herself, but is confronted by the one-eyed man about Margo. Margo tries to end her affair with Brad, but when he threatens to expose it, they agree to continue it and keep it a secret. When Sophie comes to warn Margo about the one-eyed man, she sees Margo and Brad having sex, with Margo catching her looking.
3	3	"Sunrise Tells the Story"	Melanie Mayron	Mike Weiss	July 21, 2025
After avoiding Margo for seeing her with Brad, Sophie ultimately makes up with her. Margo takes Sophie shopping for a hunting rifle for boar hunting, where Sophie also buys a handgun, which she keeps from Graham. During a game of "Never Have I Ever", Callie coerces Sophie to admit to the group that she struck and killed a pedestrian back in Boston. Sending everyone else away, Margo consoles Sophie by revealing her poor upbringing. Upset with Brad, Abby meets with youth pastor Pete, who reveals Brad confessed something to him, leading Abby to seek out Brad. Jill calls Abby, asking about Brad, and Abby threatens to expose Brad's secret activities, leading Jill to go and find them. Margo invites Brad and his friend Jamie over, and Margo and Sophie share their first kiss over "Spin the Bottle". Sophie declines Jamie's advances, and everyone continues drinking, leading Sophie to black out. In the morning, Deputy Salazar, returning to duty after being injured pursuing missing teenager Kaycee Krummel, discovers Abby's body in the woods, having been shot to death. When Sophie wakes up and returns home, she is shocked to find she can't locate her handgun.
4	4	"Cheat Day"	Melanie Mayron	Emily Bensinger & Benjamin Flores	July 21, 2025
After Abby's body is discovered, Jill begins to scramble as Brad may be the prime suspect and makes sure he aligns his alibi with hers. As Sophie panics searching for her handgun at the lake house, Margo calms her down, and the two have sex. Afterward, Sophie reveals to Margo that she had an emergency hysterectomy after a failed second pregnancy, which led to her depression, drinking, and subsequent accident. The two of them align their own story for the other night, agreeing that they were both together by themselves the whole night. Clint puts Pete on leave from the church because of Pete's closeness with Abby. Salazar promises Abby's mother, Starr, that she will catch Abby's killer. During Abby's vigil, the police arrive to detain Sophie as they had recovered her handgun from a robber in another town and confirmed it to be the same weapon that killed Abby.
5	5	"Not Her First Rodeo"	Cheryl Dunye	Breannah Gibson & Will Hettinger	July 21, 2025
Now the prime suspect behind Abby's murder, Sophie tries to piece together the events of that night, but Graham believes she is losing control of herself. While Jed tries to do damage control, Margo sets in motion another plan. She tells the cops that she had actually left the lake house that night to deal with a family emergency. After an altercation with Starr, Jill decides to take desperate measures to ensure Brad's innocence. When the police relay Margo's story to Sophie, Graham tells her to leave, and she checks into a motel. While all evidence points to Sophie, Salazar remains skeptical of a motive. Jed's ex-wife, Sienna, calls Sophie to tell her to seek out Kyle.
6	6	"Deep in the Heart of Texas"	Cheryl Dunye	Brandon Zuck	July 21, 2025
Sophie drives to Alba, Texas, to see Kyle, who tells her that he had a drug overdose the night of Abby's murder. Sophie also learns about Margo's previous life as Mandy. Sophie meets with the doctor who treated Kyle, who confirms Margo was with them that night. Margo believes she is being blackmailed when given photos of her with Brad. When she confronts Sophie, the two agree to work together to find the killer. Salazar suspects Pete and Jill based on Abby's last calls. Margo has all of her friends sign NDAs to protect herself during Jed's campaign, but Jill refuses, fueling everyone's suspicions. Margo meets with Brad, who is already suspicious of his mother after learning about her call to Abby. Meanwhile, after speaking with Starr, Sophie talks to Pete, who reveals that Brad confessed to him that he got his girlfriend pregnant and she had an abortion, which Sophie believes was Abby. Sophie and Margo deduce Jill may have killed Abby to protect Brad's image. Pete takes Abby's friend Nina on a carnival date, where she is then drugged and kidnapped by Pete.
7	7	"Shooting Star"	Jennifer Getzinger	Kayla Westergard-Dobson	July 21, 2025
Brad discovers Jill had changed her passwords and deleted her GPS records, and he tells Margo. Sophie tells Starr about the abortion, making Starr upset but suspicious. Salazar learns that Pete was expelled from his previous church. She visits Pete and recognizes a smell from when she was shot. Realizing he is Kaycee Krummel's abductor, she and Deputy Flynn chase him and corner him on the highway, where he kills himself. Kaycee and Nina are rescued, and Salazar assumes Pete is Abby's killer until Sheriff Jonny reveals evidence to the contrary. Sophie is brought in to be shown footage from a hidden camera in the woods showing Sophie confronting Abby moments before she was killed, and Sophie is charged with Abby's murder. When Margo remains suspicious of Jill, she and Callie confront Jill, who has shot and killed Starr as Starr tried to kill Jill, believing Jill killed Abby. When Jill threatens to kill Margo, Callie shoots and kills Jill.
8	8	"Sophie's Choice"	Jennifer Getzinger	Rebecca Cutter	July 21, 2025
Jill is named Abby's killer, and the case is closed. Margo discovers that Callie was the blackmailer. After being exonerated, Sophie tells Graham she needs time to figure out herself and their marriage before she resumes her relationship with Margo. When Sophie finds something suspicious, she meets with Brad and an associate of the one-eyed man. She realizes Margo is the "girlfriend" Brad got pregnant with, not Abby. Margo had the abortion, killed Abby when she found out, and framed Jill for it. The doctor from Alba is Margo's father, who provided the abortion and, with Kyle's help, her murder alibi. Margo confirms this when confronted by Sophie, who subsequently leaves. Sophie reveals her affair to Graham, who leaves for Boston. Margo reveals her abortion to Jed, who kicks her out, leading her back to Kyle. When a stressed Sophie goes out for drinks, Kyle tries to confront her, but Sophie kills him with her car. Having been drinking, she dumps his body into a lake. She accidentally takes a call from Margo on Kyle's phone, making Margo suspicious. The one-eyed man's associate comes for Sophie at her home because she had not given him the information he requested in return.

=== Season 2 ===
No. overall	No. in season	Title	Directed by	Written by	Original release date
9	1	TBA	TBA	Rebecca Cutter	November 26, 2026
10	2	TBA	TBA	Tom Szentgyorgyi	November 26, 2026
11	3	TBA	TBA	Brandon Zuck	November 26, 2026
12	4	TBA	TBA	Kayla Westergard-Dobson	November 26, 2026
13	5	TBA	TBA	Tiffany Bratcher & Will Hettinger	November 26, 2026
14	6	TBA	TBA	Benjamin Flores & Molly Manning	November 26, 2026
15	7	TBA	TBA	Tom Szentgyorgyi & Matthew Wayt	November 26, 2026
16	8	TBA	TBA	Rebecca Cutter & Nicole Feste	November 26, 2026

== Production ==
=== Development ===
In October 2023, it was revealed Starz had given the series an eight-episode order, with Rebecca Cutter set to adapt the novel of the same name by May Cobb, and serve as executive producer and showrunner. Lionsgate Television and 3 Arts Entertainment were named as producers. In an interview with Vulture, Malin Akerman revealed that the creative team used Melania Trump as reference for her character Margo Banks. In September 2025, Netflix acquired the series as a global original for an eight-episode second season. A third season is in development and set to shoot in the fall of 2026. In October 2026, ahead of the second season premiere, Netflix renewed the series for a third season.

=== Casting ===
In January 2024, Malin Akerman joined the cast of the series. In February 2024, Brittany Snow, Dermot Mulroney, and Evan Jonigkeit joined the cast. In March 2024, Chrissy Metz, Jaime Ray Newman, Katie Lowes, and George Ferrier joined the cast. In November 2025, Hunter Emery and Karen Rodriguez had been promoted to series regulars for the second season.

In December 2025, Kim Matula, Alex FitzAlan, John Stamos, Cam Gigandet and Dale Dickey were cast in recurring roles for the second season. In January 2026, Angel Reese joined the cast in a recurring capacity for the second season. In February 2026, Casey Mills was cast in a recurring role for the second season.

=== Filming ===
Pre-production began on January 18, 2024, in North Charlotte, with 18 weeks of filming shortly following. Principal photography began by March 2024, in North Carolina. Downtown Mooresville was turned into an East Texas city. Many surrounding locations were also used for principal photography. Production wrapped in June 2024.

In an interview with Variety, Akerman said they had Lizzie Talbot, an intimacy coordinator, on set to make sure they felt comfortable with the nudity and sex scenes.

Filming for the second season began on November 17, 2025, and concluded on March 13, 2026.

=== Music ===
Jeff Danna composed the series' score.

== Release ==
Following the spin-off of Starz Inc. into an independent company separate from Lionsgate Studios, Lionsgate Television acquired rights to The Hunting Wives back from Starz. In June 2025, Netflix licensed U.S. rights to the series for a year, with the series premiering on the platform on July 21. Netflix does not have the series in Canada and Australia, where the rights are held by Crave and Stan respectively. The second season is scheduled to premiere on November 26, 2026.

== Reception ==
=== Critical response ===
The review aggregator website Rotten Tomatoes reported an 81% approval rating, based on 32 critic reviews. The website's critics consensus reads: "Brittany Snow and Malin Akerman are diabolically fun to watch in The Hunting Wives, a risqué soap that turns bad behavior into highly bingeable fun." Metacritic, which uses a weighted average, gave a score of 73 out of 100, based on 12 critics, indicating "generally favorable" reviews.

=== Accolades ===
Award	Year	Category	Recipient	Result	Ref.
Astra TV Awards	2026	Best Comedy Series	The Hunting Wives	Nominated	
Astra TV Awards	2026	Best Actress in Comedy Series	Malin Akerman	Nominated	
Astra TV Awards	2026	Best Actress in Comedy Series	Brittany Snow	Nominated	
Dorian TV Awards	2026	Campiest TV Show	The Hunting Wives	Won	
GLAAD Media Awards	2026	Outstanding New TV Series	The Hunting Wives	Nominated	
Gotham TV Awards	2026	Outstanding Lead Performance in a Drama Series	Malin Akerman	Nominated	
Queerty Awards	2026	Outstanding TV Drama	The Hunting Wives	Nominated	

=== Audience viewership ===
For the week of July 21–27, The Hunting Wives ranked third on Netflix's English-language TV list, drawing 5.2 million views. According to Luminate, the series was the most-streamed series in the United States for the week of July 25–31, accumulated over 2 billion minutes viewed.
