= Saba Homayoon =

Canadian actress

- Born: April 12, 1977 (age 48); Montreal, Quebec, Canada
- Occupation: Actress
- Years active: 2003–present
- Spouse: Neil Hopkins (m. 2007)
- Children: 2

Saba Homayoon (born April 12, 1977) is an Iranian-Canadian actress.

== Personal life ==
Saba Homayoon was born in Montreal, Quebec, Canada. She has been married to actor Neil Hopkins since 2007. The pair starred in the TV movie Hit Factor in 2008, which she also executive produced. She played Jinny in Charmed, Yasmin in How I Met Your Mother, and Faatin Amal in NCIS.

== Television ==
- Miss Match (2003) (TV series) (1 episode) as secretary
- Without a Trace (2003) (TV series) (1 episode) as assistant
- Charmed (2004) (TV series) (1 episode) as Jinny the Djinn (demon)
- The D.A. (2004) (TV series) (1 episode) as Denise Clark
- Dr. Vegas (2004) (TV series) (1 episode) as Meera
- How I Met Your Mother (2005) (TV series) (1 episode) as Yasmin
- NCIS (2006) (1 episode) as Faatin Amal
- Two Families (2007) (TV movie) as social worker
- The Loop (2007) (TV series) (2 episodes) as Jane'
- Hit Factor (2008) (TV movie) as Layla June'
- Chad (2021) as Naz'
