= Ashleigh LaThrop =

American actress

- Born: Chicago, Illinois
- Occupation: Actress
- Years active: 2014–present

Ashleigh LaThrop is an American actress. She is best known for playing Breana in the drama sitcom The Kominsky Method and Ericka Kinney in the drama series Brilliant Minds.

== Early life ==
LaThrop was born in Chicago, Illinois. She initially wanted to become a doctor. She then wanted to become a pediatrician, a neurosurgeon, and then finally, when she turned 17, she decided to be a psychologist. She was inspired to become an actress after watching the play Metamorphoses by Mary Zimmerman. She graduated from the University of Illinois Urbana-Champaign and had a 10 week residency with the Steppenwolf Theatre Company.

== Career ==
LaThrop first gained nationwide fame for playing Breana in the drama sitcom The Kominsky Method. Her first big role came playing Natalie in the dystopian series The Handmaid's Tale. She had a recurring role in the sci-fi drama series Utopia where she portrayed Becky. She is currently starring as Dr Ericka Kinney in the drama series Brilliant Minds.

== Personal life ==
In her spare time she likes travelling abroad and learning new languages.

== Filmography ==
=== Film ===
Year	Title	Role	Notes
2015	Uncle John	Beth	
2016	The View from Tall	Anne	
2017	Fifty Shades Darker	Hannah	
2018	Fifty Shades Freed	Hannah	
2021	Justice Society: World War II	Iris West	
2024	Justice League: Crisis on Infinite Earths	Iris West	

=== Television ===
Year	Title	Role	Notes
2014	Chicago P.D.	Young Woman	Episode; Thirty Balloons
2015	Sirens	Gabby	5 episodes
2016	Mad Dogs	Constable Miranda	Episode; Needles
2015-2016	You're So Talented	Devin	8 episodes
2016	Bones	Kalani	Episode; The Last Shot at a Second Chance
2017	The Real O'Neals	Christie	Episode; The Real Third Wheel
2018	This Close	Courtney#2	Episode; The Way We Were
2018	Reverie	Denise Lang	Episode; Altum Somnum
2018	The Rookie	Christine	Episode; Crash Course
2019	Commune	Zion	4 episodes
2019	The Handmaid's Tale	Natalie	7 episodes
2019	The 100	Priya Desai	6 episodes
2020	Utopia	Becky	8 episodes
2021	The Kominsky Method	Breana	16 episodes
2021	NCIS: Hawaiʻi	Tracy Moore	Episode; Rescuers
2023	Nancy Drew	Alice	4 episodes
2024-2026	Brilliant Minds	Ericka Kinney	27 episodes

=== Television ===
Year	Title	Role	Notes
2022	Need for Speed Unbound	Yaz	
