= Jeanine Serralles =

American actress

- Born: New York City, New York
- Occupation: Actress
- Years active: 2003–present

Jeanine Serralles is an American actress. She is best known for playing Colleen in the sci-fi drama series Utopia and Rachel in the crime drama series Hightown.

== Early life ==
Serralles was born in New York City. She grew up in Patchogue. She graduated from Yale School of New York.

== Career ==
She made her on screen debut in an episode of the romantic sitcom Sex and the City while her film debut was playing Dani in the musical Across the Universe. Her first recurring role came playing Angelina Grimke in American Experience. Her first big role came playing Colleen in the sci-fi drama series Utopia. She played Elena Camacho in the miniseries Apples Never Fall and Joy in the comedy film Inside Llewyn Davis Her biggest role so far has been playing Rachel in the crime drama series Hightown. She has had a prolific theatre career, picking up two Drama Desk Awards nominations, two Drama League Award nominations and Lucille Lortel Award.

== Filmography ==
=== Film ===
Year	Title	Role	Notes
2007	Unemployed Hitman	Fixer	Short
2007	Across the Universe	Dani	
2008	Two Lovers	Dayna	
2013	Inside Llewyn Davis	Joy	
2016	No Pay, Nudity	Vet Assistant	
2017	Hot Summer Nights	Daniel's Mother	
2017	Approaching a Breakthrough	Dr Jacobson	Short
2019	Cubby	Annie Tao	
2021	The Woman in the Window	Detective Norelli	
2022	Call of the Clown Horn	Gabriella	Short
2025	Lemonade Blessing	Mary Santucci	
2025	The Trophy King	Ruthy	Short

=== Television ===
Year	Title	Role	Notes
2003	Sex and the City	Bachelorette	Episode; The Post-It Always Sticks Twice
2010	The Good Wife	Sarah	Episode; Doubt
2013	American Experience	Angelina-Grimke	3 episodes
2013–2014	Person of Interest	Ross	2 episodes
2016	Netflix Presents: The Characters	Riley's Mother	Episode; John Early
2017	The Path	Meghan Cooley	Episode; Mercy
2020	Utopia	Colleen	8 episodes
2017–2020	Bull	ADA Michelle Rios	2 episodes
2024	Hightown	Rachel	7 episodes
2024	Apples Never Fall	Elena Camacho	7 episodes
2026	Interview with the Vampire	Christine Claire	2 episodes
