= Human Hibachi: The Beginning =

- Official release poster
- Directed by: Mario Cerrito
- Written by: Mario Cerrito
- Produced by: Mario Cerrito; Michael Joy; John Hoehn
- Starring: Wataru Nishida; Nicholas Ear; Ilana Lo; Zachary Chung Pun
- Distributed by: Troma Entertainment
- Release date: 2023
- Running time: 7 minutes
- Country: United States
- Language: English

Human Hibachi:The Beginning is a 2023 found footage short film and third installment of the Human Hibachi film series. It is written and directed by Mario Cerrito and released by Troma Entertainment. The movie serves as a prequel.

== Plot ==
The film follows several people who have someone tied to a chair surrounded by sprouting bamboo. The victim refuses to cooperate with them so they leave him there for several hours with the bamboo still growing. When they return later they find his lifeless body with several bamboo sprouts protruding from it.

== Cast ==
- Wataru Nishida as Jin Yamamoto
- Zachary Chung Pun as Aikio
- Nicholas Ear as Kenji
- Ilana Lo as Aya

== Production ==
The movie follows after the original Human Hibachi and Human Hibachi 2: Feast in The Forest. It was filmed and finished in June 2023.

== Release ==
The film was screened at the New Jersey Horror Con and Film Festival in 2023 and released by Troma Entertainment to their Troma Now platform on October 1, 2023. The film was also released to FOUND TV on October 11, 2025.

== Awards ==
At the New Jersey Horror Con and Film festival, the movie won best New Jersey/New York film in 2023.

== Reception ==
Horror Society gives the film a 3 out of 5 stating that the story for this one is decent as a torture porn or a straight forward found footage/snuff film but as a prequel to Human Hibachi it falls short. They also went on to say the acting is solid.
