= Human Hibachi (film franchise) =

American horror film series

- Created by: Mario Cerrito
- Original work: Human Hibachi (2019)
- Years: 2018–2026

Films and television
- Film(s): Human Hibachi (2019); Human Hibachi 2: Feast in The Forest (2022); Human Hibachi 3: The Last Supper (2025)
- Short film(s): Human Hibachi: The Beginning (2023)

Audio
- Original music: Human Hibachi by Camcorder; Found Footage Volume One (studio album)

Miscellaneous
- Toy(s): Merchandise and apparel (Unusual Horror Store); Trading cards (Terror Cards)

Human Hibachi is a series of American found-footage horror films created by Mario Cerrito which started in 2018. The movies are known for their controversial and graphic content along with dark comedic elements. The film series has obtained a cult following and are released by Troma Entertainment.

== Films ==
Year	Film	Director	Writer	Distributor	Producer
2019	Human Hibachi	Mario Cerrito	Mario Cerrito	Troma Entertainment, Invincible Entertainment, FOUND TV	Jeff Alpert, Christina Krosche, Mario Cerrito, Dave Alemi
2022	Human Hibachi 2: Feast in The Forest	Mario Cerrito	Mario Cerrito	Troma Entertainment, FOUND TV	Jeff Alpert, Christina Krosche, Mario Cerrito, Steve Sousa
2023	Human Hibachi: The Beginning	Mario Cerrito	Mario Cerrito	Troma Entertainment, FOUND TV	Mario Cerrito, John Hoehn, Mario Cerrito
2025	Human Hibachi 3: The Last Supper	Mario Cerrito	Mario Cerrito	Troma Entertainment	Jeff Alpert, Christina Krosche, Mario Cerrito, Ronald Black

=== Human Hibachi (2019) ===
The movie was filmed in 2018 in parts of New Jersey and Delaware.

It follows Katie Williams (played by Elizabeth Gaynor) on her 35th birthday. Her boyfriend Reo (played by Sopheaktra Theng) decides to mark the occasion by recording the day's festivities on his phone for prosperity. However, as the night progresses to dinner and drinks at the newly-opened hibachi restaurant where he works, the camera captures the eatery's side business of catering to the wealthy elite with an insatiable hunger for the finest cuisine.

=== Human Hibachi 2: Feast in The Forest (2022) ===
The sequel was filmed in 2021 in Mount Holly, New Jersey.

Obsessed with the first Human Hibachi video, best friends Steve Hunt (Frank Volpe) and Jacob Burnside (Nicholas Brennan) set out to find the only two left from it. The film follows their family in the deep woods. They just so happen to have a taste for flesh like the folks from the first movie. Through different tactics they find ways to lure unsuspecting campers or those that trespass on their land to their camp where they party and then butcher them for a good home cooked meal.

=== Human Hibachi: The Beginning (2023) ===
The third installment, a short film prequel, Human Hibachi: The Beginning was filmed in 2023.

The film shows a brutal look at how Jin and the Human Hibachi films got their start in Japan, before he made his way to the United States.

=== Human Hibachi 3: The Last Supper (2025) ===
The fourth installment, Human Hibachi: The Last Supper was filmed in parts of 2024 and 2025. In December 2024 filming began at Troma Entertainment studios in New York City to film Lloyd Kaufman's scene. Actors Jeff Alpert who plays Doug Patrick, Stafford Chavis (Bobby Shields) and Wataru Nishida (Jin Yamamoto) all return for the film.

The premise of the movie is, a man who suffers from hyper-religiosity, leads a cult of devout followers to partake in a "last supper" where sacrificed humans are the main course. It premiered at Rowan College at Burlington County on December 6th, 2025. Debbie Rochon was cast as Aunt Maureen in the film.

== Main series cast ==
- Wataru Nishida as Jin Yamamoto (HH, HH2, HHTB, HH3)
- Jeff Alpert as Doug Patrick (HH, HH2, HH3)
- Stafford Chavis as Bobby Shields (HH, HH3)
- Frank Volpe as Steve Hunt (HH2)
- Nicholas John Brennan as Jacob Burnside (HH2, HH3)
- Andrew Hunsicker as John Mitchell (HH)
- John Campanile as Phil Maxwell (HH)
- Debbie Rochon as Debbie (HH3)
- Sopheaktra Theng as Reo (HH)
- Raymond Bolden Jr. as Henry Hunt (HH2)
- Ally Batot as Lisa Franklin (HH2)
- Lloyd Kaufman as Uncle Lloyd (HH3)
- TJ Wren as Russell Davis (HH3)
- Mario Cerrito as Chainsaw excutioner and cameraman Mike (HH2, HH3)
- Elizabeth Gaynor as Katie Williams (HH)
- Carley Harper as Meghan Cole (HH)
- Zachary Chung Pun as Aikio (HH, HHTB, HH3)
- Dan Gregory as Daniel (HH3)
- Illene Sullivan as Maureen (HH3)

== Awards ==
The original Human Hibachi won best feature film in 2021 at the New Jersey Horror Con and Film Festival in 2021.

The sequel, Human Hibachi 2: Feast in the Forest followed up in 2022 winning the best feature film award at New Jersey Horror Con and Film Festival.

The short film prequel Human Hibachi: The Beginning won best New Jersey/New York film at the 2023 New Jersey Horror Con and Film Festival.

Human Hibachi 3: The Last Supper won "The Grand Grotesque" award at the Darkside New Jersey Film Festival in February 2026.

== Release ==
The films have been released by Troma Entertainment to their Troma Now platform. They have also been released by Found TV as well as Invincible Entertainment.

All three feature films were released to B-Movie TV on Easter weekend in 2026. The movies were slated as the headliner for the B-Movie TV innagural Easter Sunday event. Program Director Hart Fisher said ““Cannibalism is a tough genre to get right, Mario Cerrito nails it. Hell, unlike the direct-to-streaming folks, Mario did it before the email bombshells about celebrities eating children hit the net. It makes it the perfect triple threat for our first Easter Weekend Premiere.”

Human Hibachi 2 and 3 were released to Tubi in 2026.

== Merchandise ==
"Unusual Horror" licensed the franchise for a merchandise deal. They are known for merchandising other extreme horror such as August Underground, Guinea Pig (film series), A Serbian Film and more. It was the first official licensed deal and listed for two weeks on preorder.

Human Hibachi trading cards will be produced by “Terror Cards.”

== Music ==
Heavy metal band Camcorder produced a song titled Human Hibachi. The track was included in their studio album Found Footage Volume One and released on Bandcamp. The track was part of 8 songs that were written about found footage movies.
