= Mario Cerrito =

American filmmaker

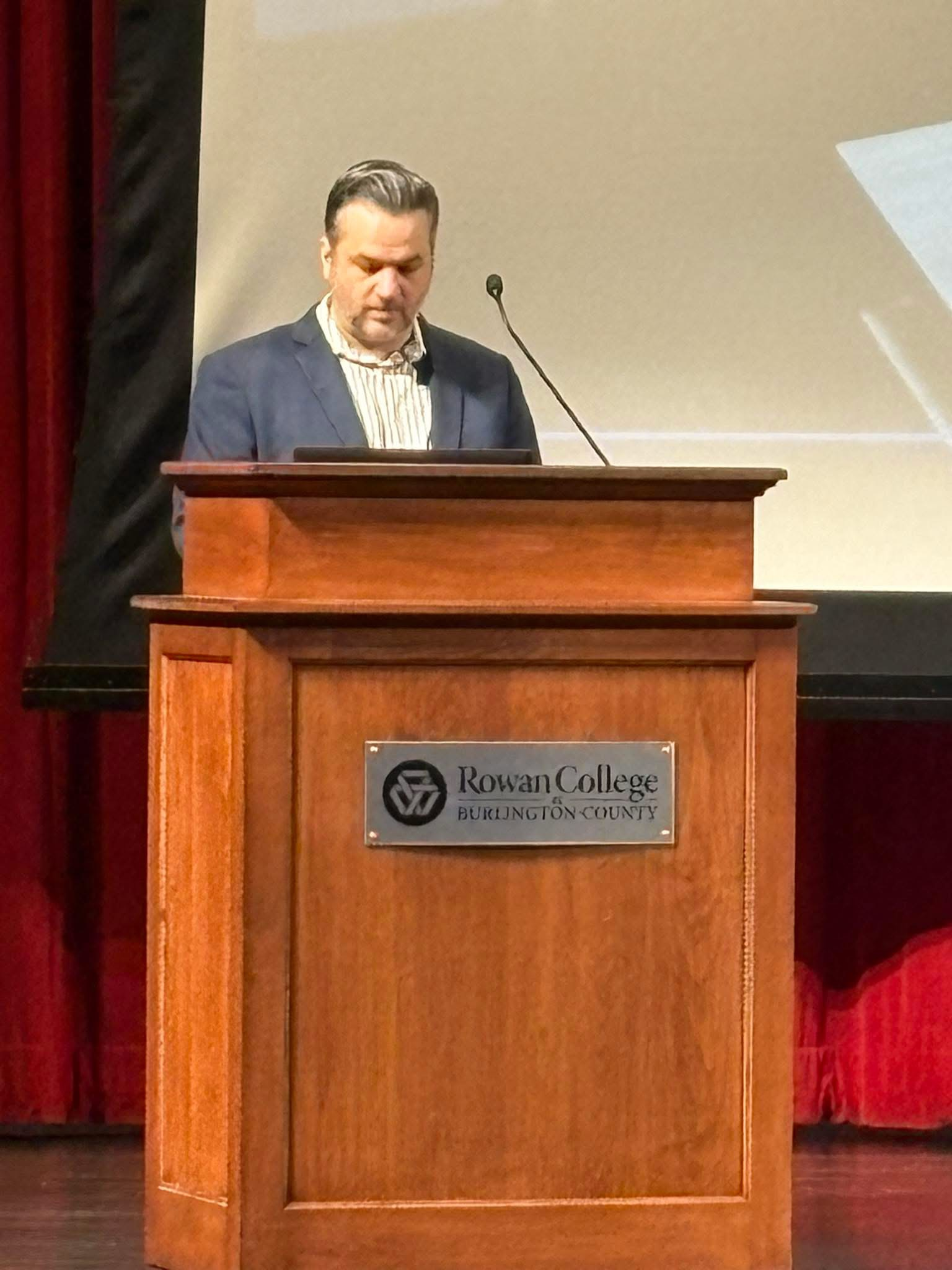
- Cerrito in 2025
- Born: Mario Cerrito III; March 1, 1984 (age 42); Philadelphia, Pennsylvania, U.S.
- Occupations: Film director, producer
- Years active: 2012–present

Mario Cerrito III (born March 1, 1984) is an American film director, writer, producer and actor most closely associated with the horror and thriller genre. He is best known for his found footage series Human Hibachi. The franchise has picked up a worldwide cult following and is released by Troma Entertainment. His films have won best feature film awards at various film festivals including the New Jersey Horror Con and Film Festival.

Along with his family, he was featured on Travel Channel’s reality television show Ghost Nation.

== Early life and education ==
Mario was born in South Philadelphia, on March 1, 1984. He was raised in Audubon, New Jersey. He is Italian American. He lived in Woodstown, New Jersey, and graduated from Woodstown High School in 2002.

Cerrito played Little League Baseball in Audubon and as a twelve-year-old was included in the Courier-Post list of top South Jersey Little Leaguers.

He went on to play at Woodstown High School from 1999–2002 where he started as an infielder all four years for the varsity team that won the South Jersey Group II championship in 2000.

Cerrito made the all Tri-County Conference as an All-Star in 2002 and was an honorable mention as a freshman in 1999 and junior in 2001.

He played Division II baseball at Rowan College at Burlington County from 2003 to 2004.

== Career ==
=== Deadly Gamble and The Listing ===
In 2007, Cerrito wrote a film titled 'The Cornfield Massacre,' and in 2012, a trailer was filmed to raise funds for the full production, which ultimately did not materialize.

In 2013, he wrote, produced, and directed his first feature film, Deadly Gamble, which screened at Delsea Drive in Theatre in Vineland, New Jersey. The film was made on a $10,000 budget and was signed to Gregory Hatanaka's distribution company Cinema Epoch. In 2015, it and was released through EPIX, Tubi, and Amazon Prime Video.

In 2015, Cerrito directed The Listing with a $25,000 budget. It won best feature film at the 2019 HNN Film Festival. The film features horror actress Jessica Cameron. The movie was represented at Marché du Film, the business counterpart to the Cannes Film Festival. The movie was acquired by distribution company SGL Entertainment. It was released in the United Kingdom, Canada and the United States to Blu-ray, DVD, Amazon Prime, Google Play and iTunes. Bloody Disgusting wrote about the movie in 2017 and Dread Central in 2019.

=== Human Hibachi series ===
Cerrito wrote, produced and directed Human Hibachi in 2018. Shot solely on an iPhone, the movie was initially deemed too extreme for a release to Amazon Prime and was released to its own website instead. At the New Jersey Horror Con and Film Festival in 2021 it was nominated for Best FX and Best Feature film, winning the latter. The film was also an official selection of Philadelphia Independent Film Festival and signed to Troma Entertainment for release. The film was later acquired by distribution company Invincible Entertainment and released to various video on demand platforms in 2022. In August 2022 the DVD ranked in the top 100 best sellers on Amazon. Invincible Entertainment brought the movie to Marché du Film at the 2023 Cannes Film Festival in France. The film later was released to FOUND TV in November 2024.

In summer 2021, Cerrito made the sequel Human Hibachi 2: Feast in The Forest. The movie was filmed in Mount Holly, New Jersey and premiered in July 2022 in Philadelphia. It went on to win best feature film at New Jersey Horror Con and Film Festival in Atlantic City, New Jersey. Troma Entertainment picked the movie up for worldwide release. The film was later released to FOUND TV in November 2024.

In 2023, Cerrito produced and directed the short film and third installment, Human Hibachi: The Beginning. The movie won best New Jersey/New York horror film at New Jersey Horror Con and Film Festival. Troma Entertainment acquired it for release to Troma Now in October of the same year.

The fourth installment, Human Hibachi 3: The Last Supper was announced in August 2024 and filmed in the winter of 2024/2025. The film stars scream queen Debbie Rochon and Lloyd Kaufman. Production started in December 2024 at Troma Entertainment studios in New York City and continued throughout February 2025 in South Jersey. The film premiered December 6th, 2025 at Rowan College at Burlington County. It was released to Found TV on February 20, 2026 and Troma Now on March 1, 2026. The film won the "Grand Grotesque" award at the Darkside New Jersey Film Festival in February 2026. In May 2026, the movie won the “Best Special Effects” award at the New Jersey Horror Con and Film Festival.

The film series has picked up an international cult following with physical media being found as far as Japan and Australia. It has been referred to by some as a modern day cult classic. In 2025 English-based horror merchandiser UnusualHorror.com signed the franchise to a merchandise deal.

Heavy metal rock band Camcorder out of Maryland made a song titled Human Hibachi. The song was part of an eight song album featuring found footage movies and listed on Bandcamp.

=== Recognition and media coverage ===
Cerrito was listed in a top ten independent horror filmmaker list from Horrornews.net in 2024.

His work has been covered by top genre sites Bloody Disgusting, Dread Central and the long time running magazine The Phantom of the Movies' Videoscope.

=== Other work ===
Cerrito wrote and produced The House in the Pines featuring Mick Strawn as Director and Joe Nicolo from Butcher Bros. as composer.

Cerrito provided the main film location for the horror film A Place in Hell. The film won best home grown horror feature film at the 2016 Garden State Film Festival. The movie was released by Anchor Bay Entertainment to multiple Video On Demand platforms.

He has also produced Variety (2015), Arisen I SAW (2016), The Philly Offensive (2016), Chase Street (2016), and Right Before Your Eyes (2017), among others.

In 2023, Cerrito started a haunted attraction business, Fear Village, at Voorhees Town Center in Voorhees Township, New Jersey. In April 2024, a fire in the mall stalled the plans to open.

Cerrito made a short film called Wall Of Souls in 2024.

As of October 2026, Cerrito began directing the paranormal found footage film The Amwellbury Hauntings.

=== TV appearances ===
Cerrito and his family were featured on the Travel Channel's reality show Ghost Nation. Paranormal investigator Jason Hawes and his crew visited Cerrito's house and the program aired in October 2019. The episode was titled, "The Novelist's Nightmare." He also had a minor role in the series Chase Street, which was featured on Amazon Prime.

=== Public appearances ===
Cerrito was part of the Q&A panel of industry professionals at the first ever Salem County, New Jersey Film Festival. The event was held in Woodstown.

== Awards and nominations ==
| Year | Event | Work | Category | Result |
|---|---|---|---|---|
| 2019 | Horror News Network Film Festival | The Listing | Best feature film (as director) | Won |
| 2020 | Philadelphia Independent Film Festival | Human Hibachi | Best feature film | Nominated |
| 2021 | New Jersey Horror Con and Film Festival | Human Hibachi | Best film (as producer) | Won |
| 2022 | New Jersey Horror Con and Film Festival | Human Hibachi 2: Feast in The Forest | Best director | Nominated |
| 2022 | New Jersey Horror Con and Film Festival | Human Hibachi 2: Feast in The Forest | Best film (as producer) | Won |
| 2023 | New Jersey Horror Con and Film Festival | Human Hibachi: The Beginning | Best New Jersey New York film | Won |
| 2023 | New Jersey Horror Con and Film Festival | Human Hibachi: The Beginning | Best director | Nominated |
| 2026 | Darkside New Jersey Film Festival | Human Hibachi 3: The Last Supper | Twisted Vision Award (Best Director) | Nominated |
| 2026 | Darkside New Jersey Film Festival | Human Hibachi 3: The Last Supper | The Grand Grotesque (Best Film) | Won |
| 2026 | New Jersey Horror Con and Film Festival | Human Hibachi 3: The Last Supper | Best Special Effects | Won |

== Books and other writing ==
In 2013, Cerrito wrote Chasin' Brandy: An Extraordinary Tale of Puppy Love. The same year, he also co-wrote a screenplay, Union City Streets, with Renoly Santiago.

== Filmography ==
=== Film ===
| Year | Film | | | | | | |
| Year | Film | Director | Screenwriter | Producer | Actor | Location Scout | Notes |
|---|---|---|---|---|---|---|---|
| 2014 | The Meatball | No | Yes | Yes | Yes | No | Short film |
| 2015 | Deadly Gamble | Yes | Yes | Yes | Yes | Yes | |
| 2015 | A Place in Hell | No | No | No | No | Yes | |
| 2015 | Arisen | No | No | Yes | No | No | |
| 2016 | I SAW | No | No | Yes | No | No | |
| 2017 | The Listing | Yes | Yes | Yes | Yes | Yes | |
| 2019 | Right Before Your Eyes | No | No | Yes | No | No | |
| 2020 | Human Hibachi | Yes | Yes | Yes | No | Yes | |
| 2022 | Human Hibachi 2: Feast in The Forest | Yes | Yes | Yes | No | No | |
| 2023 | Human Hibachi: The Beginning | Yes | Yes | Yes | No | No | Short film |
| 2024 | Wall Of Souls | Yes | Yes | Yes | No | Yes | Short film |
| 2025 | Human Hibachi 3: The Last Supper | Yes | Yes | Yes | Yes | Yes | |
| 2027 | The Amwellbury Hauntings | Yes | No | Yes | No | Yes | In production |

=== Television ===
| Year | Title | As Self | Actor | Notes |
|---|---|---|---|---|
| 2017 | Chase Street | No | Yes | Season 1 Episode 3 |
| 2019 | Ghost Nation | Yes | Yes | As self in Season 1 Episode 3 "The Novelist's Nightmare" |

== Personal life ==
Cerrito and his wife Charmaine reside in Mantua Township, New Jersey.
