= Human Hibachi 3: The Last Supper =

American horror film

- Directed by: Mario Cerrito
- Screenplay by: Mario Cerrito
- Produced by: Dallas Cheeseman; John T. Gasper III; Jeremy Hirsch; Fiona C. Johnson; Michael Anthony Joy
- Starring: Debbie Rochon; Lloyd Kaufman; Jeff Alpert; Wataru Nishida; Mario Cerrito; Stafford Chavis
- Music by: Bobby Carra
- Production company: Slaughterhouse Films
- Distributed by: Troma Entertainment
- Release dates: December 6, 2025 (Rowan College at Burlington County); February 20, 2026 (FOUND TV); March 1, 2026 (TROMA NOW)
- Country: United States
- Language: English

Human Hibachi 3: The Last Supper is a 2025 found footage horror film written and directed by Mario Cerrito and the fourth installment of the Human Hibachi series.

== Premise ==
A man who suffers from hyper-religiosity, leads a cult of devout followers to partake in a "last supper" where sacrificed humans are the main course.

== Cast ==
- Debbie Rochon as Maureen
- Jeff Alpert as Doug Patrick
- Lloyd Kaufman
- Stafford Chavis as Bobby Shields
- Wataru Nishida as Jin Yamamoto
- Mario Cerrito as Zach

== Production ==
Production started in December 2024 at Troma Entertainment studios in New York City to film the scenes for Troma president Lloyd Kaufman. Principal photography continued in South Jersey in February 2025.

Debbie Rochon's involvement was initially delayed due to bad weather in Canada, resulting in her not being able to make it to the original shoot in February. Production considered remote filming her as an alternative, but plans were ultimately revived when Rochon notified the producers of her upcoming trip to Newark, New Jersey. A scene was crafted on short notice and her scene was filmed in April 2025.

== Release ==
The film premiered at Rowan College at Burlington County on December 6, 2025. It released to video on demand on February 20, 2026 to FOUND TV and March 1st, 2026 to TROMA NOW.

Tubi released the film in May of 2026.

== Awards ==
The movie won "The Grand Grotesque" award at the Darkside New Jersey Film Festival in February 2026.

In May 2026 the movie won the “Best Special Effects” award at the New Jersey Horror Con and Film Festival.

== Reception ==
Jim Cox, writer and founder of ''Grimoire of Horror'' says, "the films narrative feels like a return to the themes of the original entry. While Human Hibachi 2 presented itself as more of a home video featuring a deeply disturbed backwoods family, this instalment reconnects with its roots in snuff film production and the Asian black market associated with Human Hibachi. Additionally, the film is rich with callbacks to earlier titles, such as the now infamous “Give me that Red” scene, which fans of the series will instantly recognize." They went on to say, "What sets this entry apart from its predecessors is the introduction of religious elements through the cult’s megalomaniacal piety. The embellishment of Christianity to encompass categorically non-Christian ideals—namely, human sacrifice, murder, cannibalism, and suicide—is an exaggerated reflection of many contemporary religious movements. It serves to justify various despicable rhetoric and injustices in the name of a faith that objectively denounces such behaviour, adding a haunting depth to the narrative." Concluding the review of the entry, Cox says, "A brutally visceral depiction of human sacrifice and cannibalism, Human Hibachi 3: The Last Supper provides a fitting finale to a series that has amassed a cult following since 2020. With its reconnection to the themes of the original, expansion into new narrative territory, impressively gruesome effects, and solid acting performances, the film is destined to appeal to dedicated fans and aficionados of independent genre cinema alike." Grimoire of Horror rated the movie 3.5/5.

Horror Society gave the film a 3/5 rating stating, "Overall, Human Hibachi 3: The Last Supper may not be the best film of the trilogy (or franchise, however you look at it) but it’s probably my favorite of them all. Religious horror, when done right, is very effective and this one did a great job with that. It is a bit outlandish but it’s fun and that’s all we can ask for a movie to do."
