= Heather Dorff =

American actress, writer, and producer

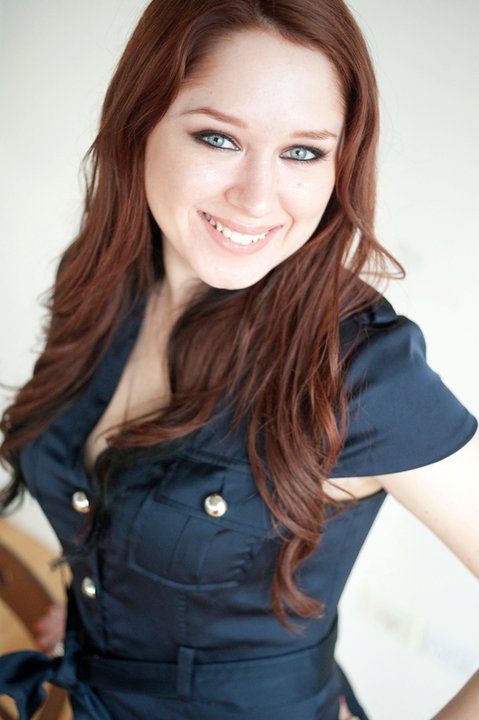
- Born: Heather Dorff
- Occupations: Actress, film producer, screenwriter
- Notable work: Independent films "What They Say" and Truth or Dare
- Website: www.heatherdorff.com

Heather Dorff is an American actress, writer, and producer currently living in Los Angeles, California.

== Career ==
Dorff is probably best known for her roles in the 2011 short film "What They Say", which she also produced and co-wrote, and the 2013 feature film Truth or Dare. Dorff has also appeared in music videos, web series, and has been dubbed a "scream queen" and rising talent by Horror Society.

Dorff starred in the film The Tour alongside fellow scream queen Jessica Cameron, which has been shown in horror film festivals that include FrightFest in London and ScreamFest in Los Angeles. In 2020, Dorff's latest film A Bad Place had its world premiere at Cinequest Film & Creativity Festival in San Jose before the festival had to be rescheduled due to growing COVID-19 safety concerns.

== Achievements ==
Dorff has won, or been nominated for, performance awards from film festivals and organizations around the U.S. She won the 'Best Actress' award at the 2014 Chicago Horror Film Festival for her role in 'The Tour'. In 2012 she won 'Best Actress' or 'Best Female Performance' awards from The Critics Word, Chicago Horror Film Festival, Yuma Film Festival, and Ocean County Library Film Festival for her role in What They Say. She also won 'Best Actress' awards for her roles in Hand of Glory and the Ed Wood satire comedy and tribute film House of Degenerate Brain-Eating Mutant Fog Insects at the Prairie State Film Festival and Laugh or Die Comedy Film Festival, respectively.

Dorff was nominated for a 'Best Actress' award at the 2014 Indie Horror Film Festival for her role in Truth or Dare. She was also nominated 'Best Actress' at the 2012 Maverick Movie Awards for her role in Hand of Glory.

== Filmography ==
Year	Film	Role	Notes
2020	Make It a Scary One	Cassie	
2020	Human Zoo	Contestant 84	
2019	Wages of Sin: Special Tactics	Detective Dorne	
2018	A Bad Place	Collette	
2018	Bad Apples	Pregnant Woman	
2017	The Curse of Buckout Road	Throat Slit Suicide	
2017	Red Eye	Ryan O'Riley	
2016	Drifted	Tracy	
2015	Spades	Kathy	
TBA	Happenstance	Heather	
2014	The Tour	Cassie	
2013	Truth or Dare	Michelle Lucas	
2013	Intrusive Behavior	Tabitha	
2013	Dark Realm	Sister Midnight	
2013	City of Lust	Ashley Barnes	also produced
2012	Hand of Glory	Karen	
2011	Afraid of Sunrise	Perrey	
2011	What They Say	Unnamed / Narrator	also produced

=== Television and web series ===
Year	Show	Role	Notes
2016 - 2019	Scream Queen Stream	Host	Web series
2013	Filming Round Midtown	Host	Web series
2013 - 2014	Cafe Kremlin	Katie Spagnano	TV / Web series; 2 ep.
