= The Listing =

- Directed by: Mario Cerrito
- Written by: Mario Cerrito
- Produced by: Mario Cerrito; Robert Palmer; Bernard Glincosky
- Starring: Jessica Cameron; Bernard Glincosky; John DiRenzo; Julie Stackhouse; Mario Cerrito
- Cinematography: Cameron S. Mitchell
- Music by: Andrew Mendolia
- Distributed by: Indie Rights; SGL Entertainment; MVD Entertainment Group
- Release date: 2017
- Running time: 73 minutes
- Country: United States
- Language: English

The Listing is a 2017 horror/thriller film directed by Mario Cerrito. The movie was released by SGL Entertainment, MVD Entertainment Group and Indie Rights in Canada, United Kingdom and United States.

== Plot ==
Michael Mourer seemingly has everything going for him in life. He has a great family and is excelling at his job. He closes the biggest sale of his career and celebrates with his wife that evening. The next morning his son is kidnapped off his front lawn and he is given a ransom note by the abductors. Michael is told he must kill and deliver 6 bodies in twenty four hours if he ever wants to see his son again. It becomes a race against time for Michael and he ultimately decides to use the house he is showing for a trap to lure people in and ultimately kill them.

== Cast ==
- Bernard Glincosky as Michael Mourer
- Jessica Cameron as Jenna
- Julie Stackhouse as Karen Mourer
- Mario Cerrito as Max
- John DiRenzo as John Carr

== Production ==
The film was produced in the summer of 2015 in New Jersey and wrapped on August 23 of the same year.

== Release ==
The movie first premiered at the Newtown Theatre in Newtown Pennsylvania in 2017. It was then represented at the Marché du Film at the Cannes Film Festival. It was released by distribution companies Indie Rights and SGL Entertainment to Blu-ray and video on demand services in 2019. The film won best feature film at the 2019 Horror News Network film festival and won best actor (Bernard Glincosky) at the 2023 New Jersey Horror Con and Film Festival.

== Reception ==
Bloody Disgusting says the movie is "A solid tension builder that gauges the limits of human desperation over morality, and what bad things a good person may do without any other options."

Scaredstiffreviews.com says, "The pace is fast and the movie flew by quickly. It’s a little bit SAW and a little bit RANSOM, but it has its own unique spin and angle. The writing is where this movie really excels.
