= Rowan College =

Rowan College may refer to:

- Rowan College of South Jersey
- Rowan College at Burlington County
- Rowan University, formerly called Rowan College of New Jersey
