= Jimpressions =

Jimpressions may refer to:

- Jim Meskimen's one man show.
- James Stephanie Sterling's online web show.
