= Mania (2015 film) =

- Directed by: Jessica Cameron
- Written by: Jonathon Higgins
- Produced by: Mem Ferda
- Starring: Tristan Risk & Ellie Church
- Production company: Small Town Girl Production
- Release date: 2015
- Running time: 88 minutes
- Country: United States
- Language: English

Mania is a 2015 American independent horror film written by Jonathon Higgins and directed by Jessica Cameron. It was produced by Mem Ferda, and released by Cameron's production company, Small Town Girl Production. Funding for the film was raised via an IndieGoGo campaign, in which rewards included the ability to vote on the locations for filming. It was part of a three-film project, in which two feature films (Mania & Desolation) were produced, as well as a behind-the-scenes documentary, Kill the PA.

The plot of Mania follows a murderous lesbian couple on the run from the law, and stars Tristan Risk and Ellie Church. It has the tagline, "A Fucked Up Lesbian Love Story," and contains graphic violence, sex, and other disturbing imagery.

== Premise ==
Mel (Church) and Brooke (Risk) must go on the run, following a violent murder committed by Brooke, during a fit of mania. Violence follows them as they flee cross-country, and disturbing truths about Brooke are revealed; Mel is forced to decide how far she is willing to go for their relationship.

== Cast ==
- Ellie Church as Mel
- Tristan Risk as Brooke

== Production ==
Mania was filmed in 2014, while director Jessica Cameron, cast, and crew travelled cross-country in an RV. During production, a behind-the-scenes documentary, Kill the PA (dir. Aaron Lane), chronicled the experience, as well as the making of sister film, Desolation. It was produced by Mem Ferda.

== Premiere and reception ==
Mania premiered at the Arizona Underground Film Festival, on September 18, 2015, the same festival that premiered Cameron's 2013 indie horror film, Truth or Dare. At this premiere, it was awarded, Best Horror Feature.

Fred Topel, of Nerd Report, praised its ability to convey the chaos and madness of psychological mania, stating, "Director Jessica Cameron gives us a lot of ways to experience a sort of mania without disrespecting people who actually suffer from psychological conditions."

== Awards ==
- Best Feature at Arizona Underground Film Festival (2015, won)
- Best Feature at RIP Film Festival (2015, won)
- Best Actress at RIP Film Festival (2015, won)
- Best Film- Audience Award at Los Angeles International Underground Film Festival (2015, won)
- Best Actress- Audience Award: Ellie Church at Los Angeles International Underground Film Festival (2015, won)
- Best Actor- Audience Award: Steve Lochowitz at Los Angeles International Underground Film Festival (2015, won)
- Best Narrative Feature at Los Angeles International Underground Film Festival (2015, won)
