= Mem Ferda =

British film and TV actor

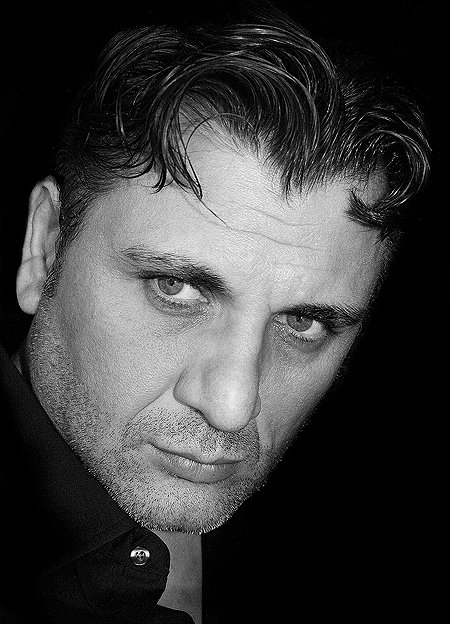
- Born: Mem Ferda; 30 October 1963 (age 62); Chelsea, London, England
- Education: London Academy of Music and Dramatic Art
- Occupation: Actor
- Website: www.memferda.com

Mem Ferda (born 30 October 1963 in London) is a British actor and film producer of Turkish Cypriot descent.

== Biography ==
Ferda was born in Chelsea, London in 1963 to Turkish Cypriot parents. At the age of six, his mother took him to Cyprus, where his father was the Minister of Agriculture. The family emigrated back to London when he was 12 years old, following an assassination attempt on his father. Whilst studying, Ferda achieved two university degrees, a BSc Honors degree in Psychology and a master's degree in Business Administration (M.B.A.). He then began acting in television commercials and was eventually accepted and graduated from the London Academy of Music and Dramatic Art with a Postgraduate Diploma in acting. He has become known for playing the roles of villains.

== Filmography ==
Act
Film
Year	Film	Role	Notes
1996	Evita	Arresting Officer	
1999	The Lost Son	Pimp	
2004	Hide & Seek	George/Byron	Short film
2004	Elshera	Mustapha	
2004	Iffy	Ben	
2004	Kritzi: The Little Goat	Rob Hunter	
2005	Experiment	Vladimir Miszich	
2005	Revolver	Macha's Goon	
2008	The Crew	Dusan	
2010	Legacy: Black Ops	Andriy	
2011	The Devil's Double	Kamel Hana	
2011	The Veteran	Hakeem	
2011	Emulsion	Egor	
2012	Ill Manors	Vladimir	
2012	Pusher	Hakan	
2012	Gridiron UK	Side Kick	
2012	Dirty Money	Ilir Duka	
2013	Plastic	Tariq	
2015	Hard Tide	Simon Flowers	
2016	Breakdown	Hakan Abaci	
2016	Thorn	Detective Cyphers	
2016	Smoking Guns	Bektash Ali	
2016	The Gridiron	Laddo	
2016	Eliminators	Giordani	
2017	London Heist	Lenny Moore	
Television
Year	Show	Role	Notes
1995	The Bill	Hechman	TV series (1 episode)
1995	London Bridge	The Waiter	TV series (1 episode)
1996	Kavanagh QC	Sgt. Wright	TV series (1 episode)
1996	Drop the Dead Donkey	Newsroom Employee	TV series (1 episode)
1996	Pirates	Gym Instructor	TV series (1 episode)
1996	Family Money	Aeroplane Passenger	TV series (1 episode)
1997	Supply & Demand	PCI Johnson	TV film
1997	Chalk	Teacher	TV series (1 episode)
1997	Jonathan Creek	Drunk	TV series (1 episode)
1997	Gayle's World	Gallery Owner	TV series (1 episode)
1997	This Life	Mike	TV series (1 episode)
1997	Birds of a Feather	Hunky Man	TV series (1 episode)
1997	Holding On	The Witness	TV mini-series
1997	Trial & Retribution	Sgt. Crocker	TV series
1997	The History of Tom Jones, a Foundling	The Prison Guard	TV mini-series
1997	The Fast Show		
1998	Noel's House Party	The Passenger	TV series (1 episode)
1998	A Wing and a Prayer	Violent Passenger	TV film
1998	Family Affairs	Danny	TV series (1 episode)
1999	Red Handed	Restaurant Diner	TV series (1 episode)
1999	See How They Run	Scott	TV Short
1999	Roger Roger	Marco	TV series (1 episode)
2000	London's Burning	Joe	TV series (1 episode)
2003	Dream Team	Manager	TV series (1 episode)
2004	She's Gone	Turkish Cop	TV film
2004	EastEnders	Gaz	TV series (1 episode)
2005	Planespotting	Turkish Prisoner	TV film
2005	Spooks	Doorkeeper	TV series (1 episode)
2006	A Good Murder	Andrei	TV film
2006	Heartbeat	Andrei Beschastnych	TV series (1 episode)
2007	Saddam's Tribe	Taras Rabinovich	TV film
2007	The Whistleblowers	Mustafa Doglu	TV series (1 episode)
2013	By Any Means	Robbie Fitchet	TV series (1 episode)
2014	Rude Boys	Mr Yildiz	TV series (1 episode)

Producer
Film
Year	Film	Notes
2010	Don't Call Back	Associate producer
2010	Bad Company	Executive producer
2011	Emulsion	Executive producer
2011	Gridiron UK	Associate producer
2013	Dragonfyre	co-producer
2013	Truth or Dare	Producer
2013	Sixteen	Associate producer
2013	Wasteland	Executive producer
2014	Haunting of Cellblock 11	Associate producer
2014	Extinction	co-producer
2014	Delusional	Associate producer
2015	Mania	Producer
2016	Thorn	Producer
2016	K-Shop	co-producer
2016	Monumental	Associate producer
2017	Malevolent	co-producer
2017	The Last Scout	co-producer
2017	Once Upon a Time at Christmas	Producer
2017	Bonehill Road	Producer
2017	Lilith	Producer
2017	Mermaid Down	Associate producer
2017	Kill the Production Assistant	Producer
2018	Mad World	Producer
2018	Age of the Living Dead (TV Series)	Producer (6 episodes)
2018	Crypto	co-producer
2018	No Easy Days (TV Series)	Executive producer (8 episodes)
2018	Dystopia (TV Series)	Producer (8 episodes)
2018	All the Violence That Goes Unseen (TV Series)	Producer
2018	The Dunes	co-producer
2018	Monster	Associate producer
2018	Severed Silence	Producer
2019	Twice Upon a Time at Christmas	Producer
2023	The Fearway	Producer
2024	The Mouse Trap	Producer

== Theatre credits ==
- Dr.Dudakov in Summerfolk
- Shylock in The Merchant of Venice
- Bosola in The Duchess of Malfi
- Francis Flute in A Midsummer Night's Dream
- Brutus in Julius Caesar
- Terrance in Fucking Games

== Personal life ==
Ferda is the cousin of İrsen Küçük, the Prime Minister of the Turkish Republic of Northern Cyprus between 2010 and 2013.
