= Hartford, New Jersey =

Populated place in Burlington County, New Jersey, US

- Unincorporated community
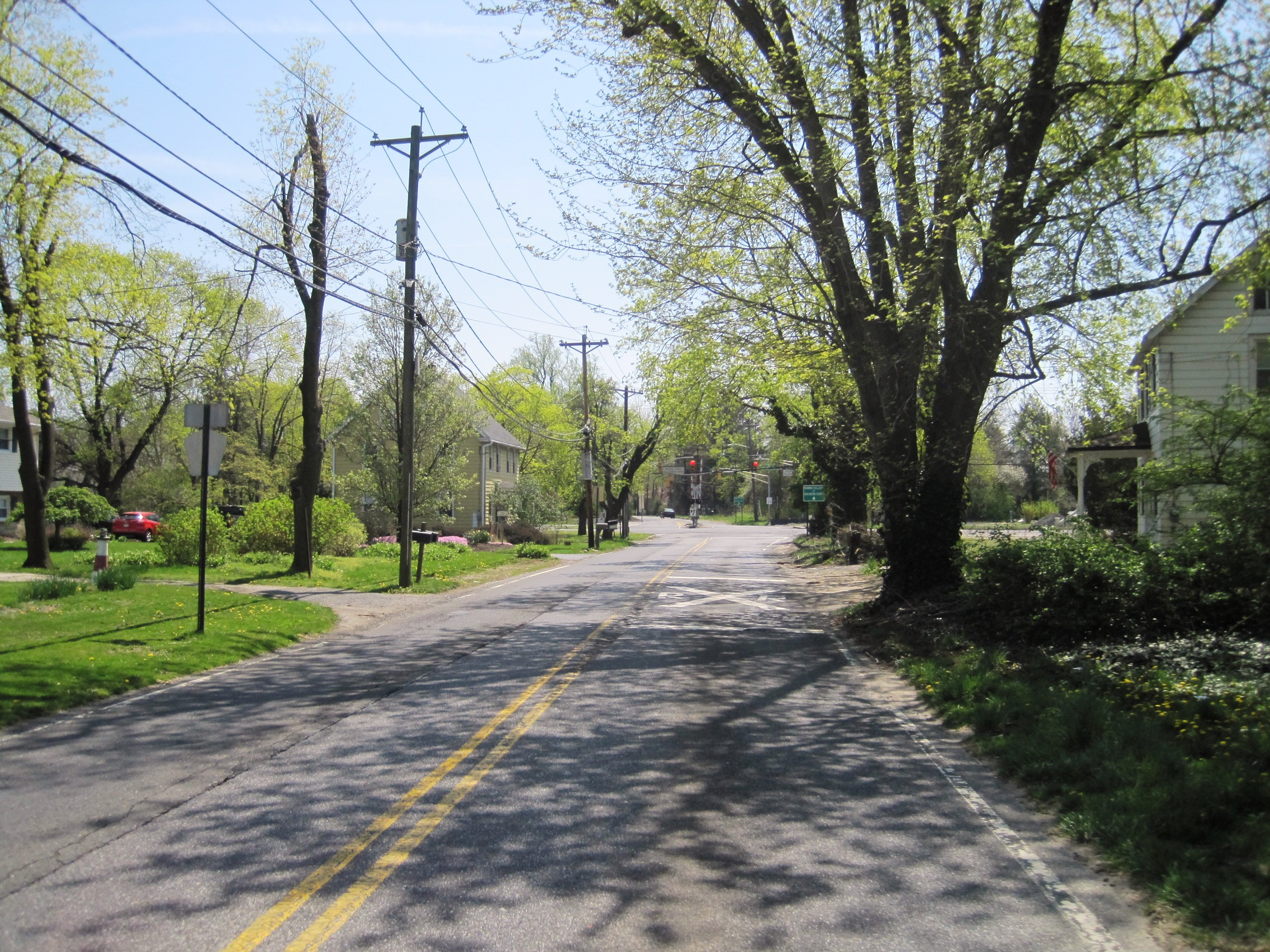
- Hartford Road

- Location in Burlington County (Inset: Burlington County in New Jersey) Hartford (New Jersey) Hartford (the United States)
- Coordinates: 39°58′34″N 74°53′39″W
- Country: United States
- State: New Jersey
- County: Burlington
- Township: Mount Laurel
- Elevation: 43 ft (13 m)
- Time zone: UTC−05:00 (Eastern (EST))
  - Summer (DST): UTC−04:00 (Eastern (EDT))
- Area code: 856
- GNIS feature ID: 876979

Hartford is an unincorporated community located within Mount Laurel Township, in Burlington County, in the U.S. state of New Jersey. Rowan College at Burlington County's Mount Laurel Campus is located in Hartford, on Route 38 between Hartford Road and Briggs Road.

== Transportation ==
Hartford is located near some major roads, including County Route 537 and Route 38. The New Jersey Turnpike and Interstate 295 cannot access the community of Hartford directly, even though the two highways are located less than one-quarter mile (0.40 km) northwest of the community. Exit 40 on I-295 and exit 4 on the Turnpike provide the closest access to Hartford.

New Jersey Transit provides bus service to and from Philadelphia on the 317 and 413 routes.
