= Eliminators (2016 film) =

- Directed by: James Nunn
- Written by: Nathan Brookes: Bobby Lee Darby
- Produced by: James Harris
- Starring: Scott Adkins; Wade Barrett; Daniel Caltagirone; James Cosmo; Mem Ferda
- Cinematography: Luke Bryant
- Edited by: Paul Harb
- Music by: Claude Foisy
- Production companies: Universal Pictures; WWE Studios
- Release date: December 6, 2016
- Running time: 94 minutes
- Countries: United States; United Kingdom
- Language: English

Eliminators is a 2016 action thriller film directed by James Nunn. The direct-to-video film stars Scott Adkins, Wade Barrett, Daniel Caltagirone and James Cosmo. Eliminators was produced and released by WWE Studios. Adkins plays a former U.S. Federal agent in witness protection, being tracked by a deadly contract killer played by Barrett. It received generally mixed reviews.

== Plot ==
Former U.S. Federal agent Thomas McKenzie, now using the name Martin Parker, is living in London under witness protection with his eight-year-old daughter, Carly. Thomas had worked undercover inside the crime syndicate of American arms dealer Charles Cooper, where he fell in love and married Cooper's daughter. Thomas' wife has since died from a car bomb, and Cooper wants to kill him for revenge and get his granddaughter into his custody so he can groom her into his successor for his arms business.

During a dispute in arms sale, three mafia members demand their money back from Cooper as they state that his guns are rip-off but Cooper uses the guns he sold to them to shoot them dead, proving that the three just want to scam him. He then orders his assistant to get his granddaughter back.

One night, three armed burglars with the wrong address break into their London home looking for cocaine. After a brutal fight, and with a gun pointed at Thomas and a knife to Carly's neck, Thomas takes the gun and kills the burglars. He calls U.S. Embassy colleague Gail Callister before passing out due to a head wound.

Thomas wakes handcuffed in his hospital bed, charged with murder and with his face all over the news. Carly has been taken to Kavendish Place, Child Social Services, where she is placed in the care of Stacey. Cooper, having finally found him, sends deadly British hitman George "Bishop" Edwards to kill Thomas and bring him Carly.

Thomas' old friend, Ray Monroe, calls to explain that he is on a flight from the U.S. and will arrive in two hours to sort out the witness protection status with the British authorities, as Callister and the U.S. Embassy has proven incapable of handling the situation.

Worried about Carly, Thomas engages in a brutal fight with three policemen and escapes from the hospital. He finds Bishop trying to hack a database at Kavendish Place, and believes he is a child care worker. Bishop attacks him, but Thomas manages to get the location of Carly then escapes in a taxi just before Bishop can stop him. Bishop, with sophisticated computer systems in his car, tracks down the taxi, calls the driver, tells him that his fare is incredibly dangerous and advises him to pull over at a petrol station. Bishop arrives seconds later, but Thomas has escaped.

Playing back the petrol station's surveillance system, Bishop sees that Thomas got on the back of a truck, and Bishop again uses his computers to track the vehicle. Thomas reaches a cable car terminal and enters a gondola before Bishop can stop him. Bishop hollers to two thugs in the gondola that he will pay them £10,000 to knock out Thomas. Thomas knocks them out in a brutal fight, then borrows a cellphone from an innocent passenger. He is able to call Ray, who meets him at the cable car terminal across the Thames. Bishop drives up and shoots Thomas in the abdomen as he jumps into Ray's car.

They arrive at a safe house (apartment suite) where Ray cleans the bullet wound. Bishop has tracked them and blows out a wall from the next suite. Bishop kills Ray as he and Thomas flee. When Bishop returns to his car, Thomas emerges from the back seat, holding Bishop at gunpoint and directing him where to drive. Arriving at a dock, Thomas ties Bishop's hands and starts to question him, but Bishop breaks free. They have a brutal fight until Bishop is knocked into the water, failing to re-emerge. Thomas uses Bishop's car to get to Carly.

Callister has finally sorted out the situation with the British authorities, and an embassy protection team arrive at Carly's location. Before they can leave, Cooper, his assistant Hannah, and three bodyguards arrive and shoot Stacey and kill the protection team. Cooper finds Carly and explains that he is her grandfather and loves her dearly. Thomas arrives, kills the bodyguards, and is surprised to find Bishop. The two have another brutal fight, ending when Thomas kicks Bishop onto a pickaxe, finally killing him.

Thomas enters the house, kills Hannah and Cooper, and finally has Carly safely back in his arms.

== Cast ==
- Scott Adkins as Thomas McKenzie / Martin Parker
- Wade Barrett as George "Bishop" Edwards
- Daniel Caltagirone as Ray Monroe
- James Cosmo as Charles Cooper
- Mem Ferda as Giordani
- Ty Glaser as Stacey
- Olivia Mace as Hannah
- Renee Castle as Gail Callister
- Lily Ann Harland-Stubbs as Carly
- Stephen Marcus as George
- Bruce Johnson as Agent Reid
- Sean Cronin as Big Boss Man

== Home media ==
Eliminators was released direct-to-video on Digital HD, Blu-ray, DVD, and On Demand on 6 December 2016, from Universal Pictures Home Entertainment.

== Reception ==
=== Critical response ===
According to critic aggregation site Rotten Tomatoes, it has a score of 35% with the critical consensus of; "Eliminators boasts a shaky plot and terrible dialogue, but the fights - including a scrap inside one of the gondolas on the Thames cable car - are brawny enough to keep fans of the genre satisfied."
