= Daniel Caltagirone =

English actor (born 1972)

- Born: 18 June 1972 (age 54); London, England
- Occupations: Actor; producer
- Spouse: Melanie Sykes (m. 2001; div. 2009)

Daniel Caltagirone (born 18 June 1972) is an English actor, best known for his roles in The Beach, Lara Croft Tomb Raider: The Cradle of Life, and the Oscar-winning film The Pianist. His breakthrough role came in the television series Lock, Stock..., where he played series lead Moon. He is father to two children with ex-wife Melanie Sykes.

== Early life ==
Caltagirone was born and brought up in London, where he attended St Ignatius College, Enfield. He spent a considerable amount of time as a child in New York City, where he has relatives. He graduated from the Guildhall School of Music & Drama and began his career with the Royal Shakespeare Company

== Acting career ==
Caltagirone went on to attend the Guildhall School of Music and Drama, graduating in 1997. It was during his last year at Guildhall that he was discovered by an ITV talent scout and cast as a lead in Ruth Rendell's Going Wrong. He finished filming his first film role, Legionnaire, alongside Jean-Claude Van Damme in the summer of 1998.

Shortly after, he spent a season at the Royal Shakespeare Company. Whilst at the RSC he was spotted by director Danny Boyle and cast as Unhygenix in The Beach starring Leonardo DiCaprio Before commencing work on The Beach, he joined the cast of Friends for a role in "The One with Ross's Wedding", filmed mostly in London. In 1999, he was cast by Guy Ritchie as one of the leads in Lock Stock, the TV spin off of the film Lock, Stock and Two Smoking Barrels.

Caltagirone then starred in Roman Polanski's The Pianist which went on to win an array of international awards, including Academy Awards for Best Actor, Best Director and Best Screen Play.

In 2003 he appeared in Lara Croft: Tomb Raider – The Cradle of Life with Angelina Jolie and Gerard Butler. Shortly after finishing filming on Tomb Raider he was cast in the movie The Fall. Directed by Tarsem Singh, Caltagirone played the dual roles of Hollywood star Archibald Sinclair and Governor Odious.

In 2006 Caltagirone starred in The Path to 9/11, the two part miniseries which aired in the United States on ABC. The film starring Harvey Keitel and Donnie Wahlberg dramatizes the events leading up to the September 11, 2001 attacks. Caltagirone was cast as one of the CIA operatives who were allegedly sent to kill Osama bin Laden. In 2009, he played ex-SAS Captain Gideon Stone in The Fixer. He portrayed aristocrat Girolamo de Treviso in The Tudors in 2010. He then performed at The Hampstead Theatre in .45, playing alongside fellow Tudors alumna Natalie Dormer in 2011. In 2016, he appeared in the TV series Medici: Masters of Florence.. In 2020 he played Will Arnot in Death in Paradise.

In September 2021, Caltagirone was honoured with the Nations Award in Venice for Outstanding Contribution to Film.

== Filmography ==
=== Film ===
Year	Title	Role	Notes
1998	Legionnaire	Guido Rosetti	
2000	The Beach	Unhygenix	
2000	Mad About Mambo	Carlos Rega	
2002	The Pianist	Majorek	
2002	The Four Feathers	Gustave	
2003	Lara Croft: Tomb Raider – The Cradle of Life	Nicholas Petraki	
2006	The Fall	Sinclair / Governor Odious	
2006	After...	Nate	
2010	The Reeds	Joe	
2011	Lipstikka	Michael	
2012	Outpost: Black Sun	Macavoy	
2013	Convenience	Tommy	
2015	Dough	Stephen Dayan	
2016	Smoking Guns	Richard Holt	
2016	Eliminators	Ray	
2020	Original Gangster	Campbell	
2024	Thangalaan	Lord Clement	Tamil film
2025	Aghathiyaa	French Dy	Tamil film

=== Television ===
Year	Title	Role	Notes
1997	Heartbeat	Liam	Episode: "In on the Act"
1997, 2008	The Bill	Billy Figgis / Simon Watson	2 episodes
1998	Friends	The Waiter	Episode: "The One with Ross's Wedding: Part 2"
1998	The Ruth Rendell Mysteries	Danny Danilo	3 episodes
1999	The Cyberstalking	Taylor	Television film
1999, 2000	A Touch of Frost	Ray English	2 episodes
2000	Harbour Lights	Harry Badden	Episode: "A Quiet Storm"
2000	Lock, Stock...	Moon	7 episodes
2001	The Lost Battalion	Pvt. Phillip Cepeglia	Television film
2006	The Path to 9/11	Mark	2 episodes
2008	The Passion	Eban	2 episodes
2009	Above Suspicion	DS Paul Barolli	2 episodes
2009	The Fixer	Gideon Stone	Episode #2.3
2010	Silent Witness	Peter Snelling	2 episodes
2010	The Tudors	Girolamo da Treviso	2 episodes
2010	Time Machine: Rise of the Morlocks	Hoyle	Television film
2012	The Fear	Eddie Timms	Episode #1.1
2015	Crossing Lines	Robert Penny	Episode: "Redux"
2016	Medici	Pazzi	7 episodes
2017–2019	Britannia	Brutus	10 episodes
2019	Ransom	Inspector Lorenzo Maramoldo	Episode: "It's a Ravenzo"
2019	1944: Should We Bomb Auschwitz?	John W. Pehle	Television film
2020	Death in Paradise	Will 'Wolfie' Arnot	Episode: "Murder on Mosquito Island"
2020	Agatha and the Midnight Murders	Eli Schneider	Television film
2021	Domina	Ledipus	Episode: "Fall"
