= Bad Apples (2018 film) =

2018 horror film directed by Bryan Coyne

- Official release poster
- Directed by: Bryan Coyne
- Written by: Bryan Coyne
- Produced by: Bryan Coyne; Mel House
- Starring: Brea Grant; Graham Skipper; Aly Fitzgerald; Heather Vaughn; Richard Riehle
- Cinematography: Will Barratt
- Edited by: Andrew J. Ceperley; Chris Warren
- Music by: Andrew J. Ceperley
- Production companies: Coin-op Flix; Uncork'd Entertainment
- Distributed by: Uncork'd Entertainment
- Release date: February 6, 2018 (United States)
- Running time: 85 minutes
- Country: United States
- Language: English

Bad Apples is a 2018 American slasher film written and directed by Bryan Coyne. It stars Brea Grant, Graham Skipper, Aly Fitzgerald, Heather Vaughn and Richard Riehle. It runs for 85 minutes.

The film was released on February 6, 2018, and it received negative reviews from critics.

== Plot ==
The film follows married couple Ella (Brea Grant) and Rob (Graham Skipper), who are settling into their new cul-de-sac digs after shaking off the dust of California. Unfortunately, they've arrived at a bad time; On Halloween night, two teenage girls, wearing homemade, eerie masks and dressed in dark clothes, prepare for a night out. They seem calm but clearly have violent intentions.

The girls break into a suburban home where a heavily pregnant woman is alone. They stab her repeatedly, showing a brutal and merciless side right from the start. They roam the neighborhood, randomly attacking victims.

A man living in a trailer park is stabbed multiple times. They kill a pedophile who has been stalking or threatening children, but their motives aren’t explained clearly, the killings feel chaotic and senseless.

The girls also kill the local school principal, making their attacks more personal or symbolic, but again, the reasoning is vague. The girls stalk Ella and Rob, chasing them through their home and the neighborhood. Ella tries to fight back and survive, but the attackers are relentless.

A final confrontation leads to a violent and bloody fight. The girls maintain their cold, emotionless demeanor, making the scene intense and terrifying. At the ends the girls walking away from the carnage. The neighborhood is left traumatized by the night’s horrific events, and the girls remain enigmatic, leaving their motivations unknown.

== Cast ==
- Brea Grant as Ella
- Graham Skipper as Robert
- Aly Fitzgerald as Sister #1 (as Alycia Lourim)
- Heather Vaughn as Sister #2
- Richard Riehle as Principal Dale
- Diane Ayala Goldner as Mrs. Dekker
- Miles Dougal as Samuel
- Heather Dorff as Pregnant Woman
- Sandy Stoltz as Man
- Kire Horton as Receptionist
- Sarah Parish as Nurse
- Bryan Coyne as Kenny
- Danielle Coyne as Kat (as Danielle Reverman)
- Hannah Prichard as Sandy
- Andrea Collins as Mandy
- Jasmin St. Claire as Trailer Park Murder Victim

== Reception ==
Rob Dean of Daily Grindhouse gave the film a negative review and wrote: "BAD APPLES is an OK-at-best movie with fun parts and inspired moments populated by strong acting and cool villains. It has a lot of flaws, both in the writing and filmmaking, but it shows promise of what Coyne could do with a bit more time and a few more revisions on the script and polish in post-production. It's not something that can be recommended, most viewers will be disappointed by it to be honest, but it does suggest that with more experience and perhaps better collaborators, Coyne could turn in something that actually hits the mark of being good." Nick Rocco Scalia of Film Threat rate the film 2 out of 5 rating and he simply wrote: Where Bad Apples falters most obviously is in its curious refusal to commit to a tone.

Anton Bitel of SciFiNow gave the film a positive review and he wrote: In an early scene an actual US flag is used by them as a murder weapon, hinting that Bad Apples is unmasking a peculiarly American legacy of abuse, abandonment and underclass alienation. On Culture Crypt the film has a review score of 20 out of 100 indicating "unfavorable reviews".

Felix Vasquez Jr. of Cinema Craze wrote:

Isn't a terrible movie even when you consider it's a shameless rip off of "The Strangers."
