= James Nunn =

English film director

- Born: 24 October 1985 (age 40); Sutton, Surrey, England, UK
- Education: University of Westminster
- Occupation: Film director
- Years active: 2004-present
- Known for: Hungry, Tower Block

James Nunn (born 24 October 1985) is an English film director from Sutton, Surrey, United Kingdom.

== Education ==
Nunn graduated from the University of Westminster with an honours degree in Film & Television Production.

== Career ==
Nunn has directed several low-budget action thrillers and direct-to-video sequels. In 2012, he released his first feature film Tower Block. He directed The Marine 5: Battleground and The Marine 6: Close Quarters. In 2021, he directed One Shot. In 2026, he directed the horror film Hungry.

== Filmography ==
- 2026: One Last Shot
- 2026: Hungry
- 2025: Wildcat
- 2024: Once upon a time in Malta
- 2024: One More Shot
- 2023: The Golden Bee
- 2022: Shark Bait
- 2021: One Shot
- 2018: The Marine 6: Close Quarters
- 2017: The Marine 5: Battleground
- 2016: Eliminators
- 2015: Pokerstar: Natural Born Poker Players
- 2014: Le Touristes
- 2013: Green Street 3: Never Back Down
- 2012: Tower Block
- 2008: Jump
