= One Shot (2021 film) =

- Film poster
- Directed by: James Nunn
- Screenplay by: Jamie Russell
- Story by: James Nunn
- Produced by: Marc Goldberg; Ben Jacques
- Starring: Scott Adkins; Ashley Greene Khoury; Ryan Phillippe
- Cinematography: Jonathan Iles
- Edited by: Liviu Jipescu
- Music by: Austin Wintory
- Production companies: Signature Films; Lipsync; Fiction Films; Amet Entertainment; Blue Box International
- Distributed by: Screen Media Films (United States); Signature Entertainment (United Kingdom)
- Release date: November 5, 2021
- Running time: 96 minutes
- Countries: United Kingdom; United States
- Languages: English; French

One Shot is a 2021 action thriller film directed by James Nunn and starring Scott Adkins, Ashley Greene Khoury and Ryan Phillippe. The film follows a Navy SEAL squad conducting a transport mission of a prisoner while dealing with insurgents who are after the same prisoner. It is notable for having been edited to appear as if shot in a single, continuous take. One Shot was released by Screen Media Films in theaters and on VOD on November 5, 2021. It garnered mixed reviews from critics.

== Synopsis ==
An elite squad of Navy SEALs, on a covert mission to transport a prisoner off a CIA black site island prison, are trapped when insurgents attack while trying to rescue the same prisoner.

== Cast ==
- Scott Adkins as Jake Harris
- Ashley Greene Khoury as Zoe Anderson
- Ryan Phillippe as Jack Yorke
- Emmanuel Imani as Brandon Whitaker
- Dino Kelly as Danny Dietler
- Jack Parr as Lewis Ash
- Waleed Elgadi as Amin Mansur
- Terence Maynard as Tom Shields
- Jess Liaudin as Hakim Charef
- Andrei Maniata as Adamat
- Lee Charles as Dhelkor

== Release ==
Screen Media Films acquired North American distribution rights to the film in August 2021. The film was released in theaters and on VOD on November 5, 2021.

== Sequel ==
In February 2023, Scott Adkins in his official social media revealed that he is working on a sequel titled One More Shot.

== Reception ==
One Shot received mixed reviews from critics. It has a 59% approval rating on Rotten Tomatoes based on 22 reviews, with an average score of 5.3/10.

Dennis Harvey of Variety gave the film a positive review and wrote, "Still, director James Nunn’s reunion with star Scott Adkins does effectively use that device to heighten immediacy in an effort that may not transcend their usual B-grade, adrenaline-fueled macho fare, but does bring some welcome novelty to the genre." Mark Peikert of IndieWire graded the film a C and wrote, "Lacking the polish of other entries such as Birdman and 1917, One Shot feels like a first-person shooter video game with the camera reversed for once." Leslie Felperin of The Guardian criticised the film for its "risibly cliched dialogue" and "wooden, poorly directed acting", but commended the technical aspects for its "crisp" digital technology and lighting, calling it "weirdly mesmeric as it is schlocky." Chris Knight of the National Post was commendable towards the continuous shot technique being "well executed" but felt it wasn't enough to prevent the story from being "a little thin", concluding that "while it may in fact be possible to take something that is normally edited and present it in a single, breathless rush, it's not always the best idea to do so."
