= Deadly Gamble =

- Directed by: Mario Cerrito
- Written by: Mario Cerrito
- Produced by: Matt Ingemi, John Engblom
- Cinematography: Cameron S. Mitchell
- Production company: Cerrito Productions
- Distributed by: Cinema Epoch
- Release date: March 15, 2015
- Running time: 78 minutes
- Country: United States
- Language: English

Deadly Gamble is a 2015 independent horror film written and directed by Mario Cerrito. The movie was released on US cable channels in March 2015.

== Plot ==
The film follows the downward spiral of degenerate gambler Andrew Cain in the gambling underworld. The main character gets so far deep in debt with the Russian mafia that he risks the lives of his family to fuel his addiction. He convinces his mother he needs money for a business endeavor and uses it in a high stakes poker game to try and win money to pay the Russians back.

== Cast ==
- Bernard Glincosky as "Andrew Cain"
- Lyssa Roberts as "Heather Cain"
- Manny Mertis as "Viktor"
- Michelle Pauls as "Sue"
- John DiRenzo as "Frank"

== Production ==
The film was written, produced and directed by Mario Cerrito. The movie was made on a $10,000 budget. Filming started in November 2013 in New Jersey and production spanned a month and was in post production until June 2014.

== Release ==
Deadly Gamble was signed to Los Angeles distributor Cinema Epoch. In March 2015 it was released nationwide to cable on demand platforms Comcast Xfinity, Verizon FiOS, Dish Network and Cox Cable. It was later released to various streaming platforms such as Walmart's VUDU, and Walmart.com. It was also released to EPIX and Fandango Media.

== Reception ==
The movie was ranked #3 in the top ten for independent horror films by Tom H Blog of Horror for 2015 and was also ranked in the top 40 for horror films by popular horror website and critics Hell Horror.
