= Tristan Risk =

Canadian actress

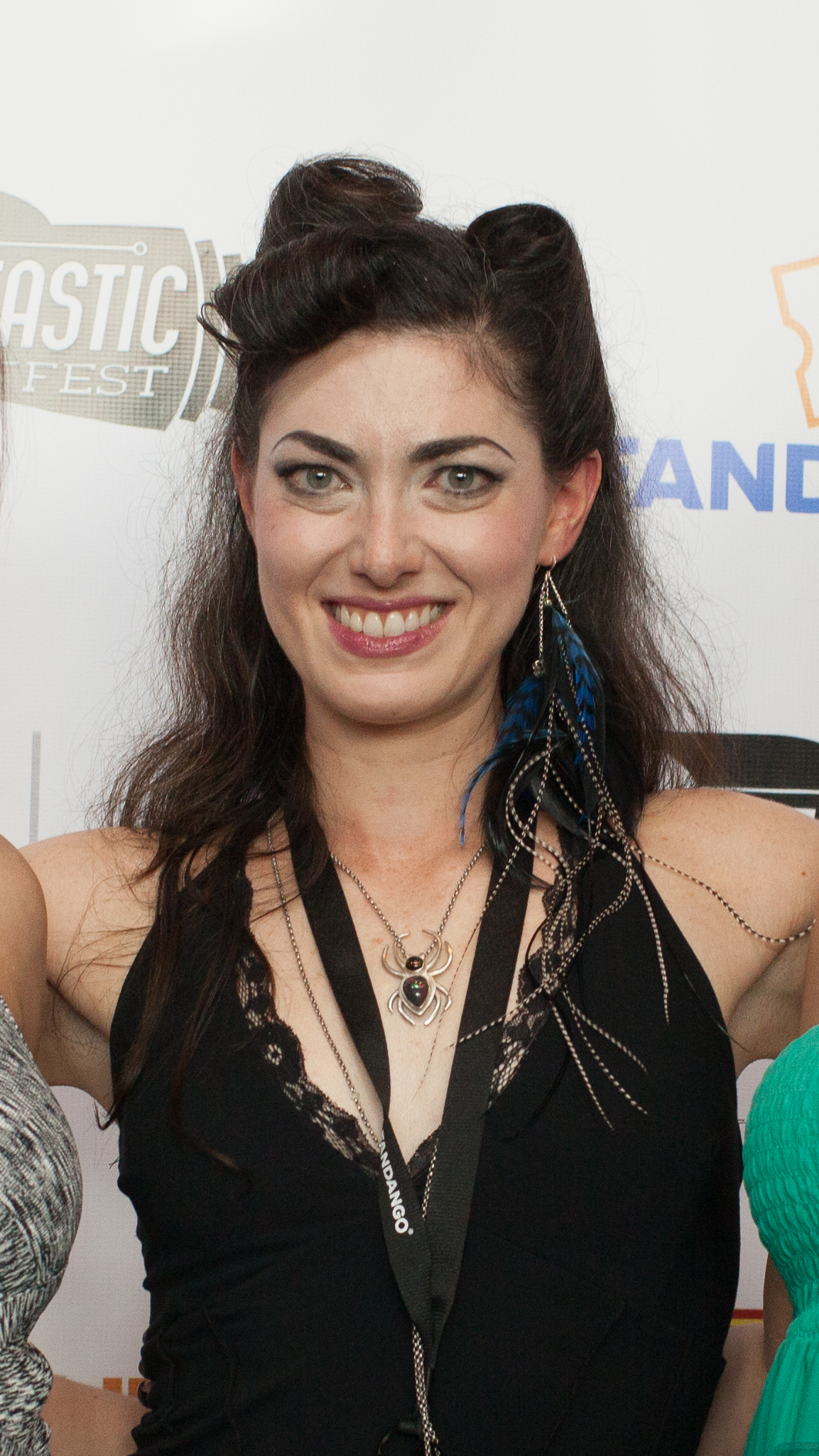
Tristan Risk

Tristan Risk, also known as Little Miss Risk, is a Canadian film actress, known for her roles in horror films such as American Mary, Ayla, and Aliens Ate My Homework. In 2014 Risk penned the script for the short film Happily Ever Evil, in which she also starred, and in February 2016 she made her directorial debut with a short film she created as part of Women in Horror Month. She has since directed Parlour Tricks and Reptile House, which she both wrote.

Prior to becoming a screen actress, Risk predominantly performed as a burlesque dancer, pin-up model, and a stage actress. Risk was given the GenreBlast Film Festival Les Femmes Du Genre award in 2016.

== Filmography ==
=== Feature film ===
- Darkest Hour (2005, as Therese)
- American Mary (2012, as Beatress Johnson)
- To Jennifer (2013, as Flight Attendant, voice)
- The Editor (2014, as Veronica)
- The ABCs of Death 2 (2014, as Yumi, segment "T")
- House of Manson (2014, as Abigail Folger)
- Bring Us Your Women (2015, as Woman, segment "Arya Tara")
- Save Yourself (2015, as Crystal Lacroix)
- Mania (2015, as Brooke)
- Real Fiction (2016, as Brothel Prostitute #2)
- Frankenstein Created Bikers (2016, as Val)
- Alphamem (2016, as Briana Hampion)
- Harvest Lake (2016, as Cat)
- Mindless (as Marie)
- Fetish Factory (as Tristan)
- Desolation (as Lily)
- Boogeyman: Reincarnation (as Taylor)
- Cuties (2017, as Miss Anna)
- Amazon Hot Box (2018, as Val)
- Aliens Ate My Homework (2018, as Madame Pong)
- Rabid (2019, as Nurse Dana / Cynthia Creature)

=== Short films ===
- Crazy Dracula Spring Break Weekend (2011, as Zombie Amy Winehouse)
- Twisted Twins (2012, as Bloody Nurse)
- WiH Massive Blood Drive PSA (2014, as Fight Club Member, segment "Soskas", uncredited)
- Call Girl (2014, as Mitzy)
- Fight Like a Girl (2014, as Fight Club Member, uncredited)
- Happily Ever Evil (2014, as Evil Tristan)
- Innsmouth (2015, as Alice Marsh)
- Haxx Deadroom (2017, as The Programmer)
- Madre De Dios (2015, as Beautiful Victim)
- To Lloyd with Love (2016, as Hostess)
- Nepenthes (2018, as Venus Audrey)

=== Television ===
- Straight to Video: The B-Movie Odyssey (2015, 1 episode: "Beaver Lake Massacre")
- Chainsaw Sally: The Animated Series (2016, as Miss Risk)
- Death Row Democracy (2016, 2 episodes, as Dysis / Dominatrix)
