= Smoking Guns =

2016 British film by Savvas D. Michael

- Theatrical release poster
- Directed by: Savvas D. Michael
- Produced by: John Pavlakos; Andrew Neophytou
- Starring: Dexter Fletcher; Daniel Caltagirone; Count Prince Miller; Ewen MacIntosh; Paul Anastasi; Andreas Karras; Jamie Crew; Tommy O'Neil; Mem Ferda
- Release dates: 2016 (Beverly Hills Film Festival); April 4, 2017 (United States and Canada)
- Running time: 93 minutes
- Country: United Kingdom

Smoking Guns is a 2016 British crime comedy film written and directed by Savvas D. Michael. The film is produced by John Pavlakos, Andrew Neophytou and executive produced by Hollywood Producer Steven Paul, Lara Minassian and Andrew Downer. It stars Dexter Fletcher, Daniel Caltagirone, Count Prince Miller, Ewen MacIntosh, Paul Anastasi, Andreas Karras, Jamie Crew, Tommy O'Neil and Mem Ferda.

Smoking Guns premiered at the 2016 Beverly Hills Film Festival where it would go on to win the Grand Jury Prize. It was released on April 4, 2017, in the US and Canada by Sony Pictures Home Entertainment.

Smoking Guns was released in the United Kingdom and Ireland On Digital HD September 11 and DVD September 18, 2017. The film was originally titled A Punters Prayer.

== Awards and nominations ==
- Winner – 16th Beverly Hills Film Festival Grand Jury Prize 2016
- Winner – Best Actor, Jamie Crew – Beverly Hills Film Festival 2016
- Winner – Award of Excellence / First Time Filmmaker Canada International Film Festival
- Nominated – Accession Award for Screenwriting, Savvas D. Michael East End Film Festival

== Soundtrack ==
Motorhead's 'Ace of spades' and George Thorogood and the Destroyers "Bad to the Bone" along with Fearne's take on Man of Constant Sorrow are highlights from a rock soundtrack that brushes elbows with many world music cues such as La Bamba and Placebo's Mars Landing Party.
