= Camel Spiders (film) =

2011 American horror sci-fi film

- Genre: Science fiction horror
- Screenplay by: J. Brad Wilke; Jim Wynorski
- Directed by: Jim Wynorski
- Starring: Brian Krause; C. Thomas Howell; Melissa Brasselle; Frankie Cullen; Hayley Sanchez; Jessica Cameron
- Country of origin: United States
- Original language: English

Production
- Executive producers: Roger Corman; Jim Wynorski
- Producers: William Dever; Steven Louis Goldenberg
- Cinematography: Andrea V. Rossotto
- Editor: Tony Randel
- Running time: 80 mins.
- Production company: New Horizons Picture Corp.
- Budget: $500,000

Original release
- Network: Syfy
- Release: March 4, 2011

Camel Spiders is a 2011 made-for-television horror sci-fi film starring Brian Krause, C. Thomas Howell, and Jessica Cameron. It was directed by genre veteran Jim Wynorski and executive-produced by Roger Corman.

== Plot ==
Creatures that for years have been rumoured to torment armed forces in the Middle East are inadvertently introduced to the southwestern deserts of the United States. The camel spiders now freely hunt for prey, unafraid of any predator—including man. No place is safe; no one is beyond their paralyzing bite. In the end, a number of hardy fighters band together to make one last stand against the creatures.

== Cast ==
- Brian Krause as Captain Mike Sturges
- C. Thomas Howell as Sheriff Ken Beaumont
- Melissa Brasselle as Sergeant Shelly Underwood
- Frankie Cullen as Schwalb
- Jessica Cameron as Ashley
- Hayley Sanchez as Hayley Mullins

== Release ==
=== Home media ===
Camel Spiders was released on DVD and Blu-ray by Lionsgate on May 27, 2012.

== Reception ==
Brett Gallman from horror film review website Oh, the Horror! gave the film a mostly negative review. In his review, Gallman criticized the film's direction, and screenplay; stating that the film "starts with the potential to be among the best of these new-wave Corman creature features, but ends up just being in the middle of the pack". Jason Coffman from Film Monthly.com gave the film a positive review, writing, "It’s not a game-changing masterpiece or anything, but Camel Spiders is proof that Corman’s approach to low-budget filmmaking is still capable of turning out fun stuff."

== Trivia ==
The film was broadcast on Tele 5 as part of the programme format SchleFaZ in season 2.
