= Tower Block (film) =

2012 film

- Theatrical movie poster
- Directed by: James Nunn; Ronnie Thompson
- Written by: James Moran
- Produced by: James Harris; Mark Lane; Ronnie Thompson
- Starring: Sheridan Smith; Jack O'Connell; Ralph Brown; Russell Tovey
- Cinematography: Ben Moulden
- Music by: Owen Morris
- Production companies: Creative Media; Tea Shop Productions
- Distributed by: Lionsgate UK
- Release date: 21 September 2012
- Running time: 90 minutes
- Country: United Kingdom
- Language: English

Tower Block is a 2012 British thriller film directed by James Nunn and Ronnie Thompson as their directorial debut, and written by James Moran. The film stars Sheridan Smith, Jack O'Connell, Ralph Brown, and Russell Tovey and entails residents of a block of flats targeted by an unseen sniper after witnessing the murder of a teenager. Tower Block was theatrically released in the United Kingdom on 21 September 2012 and was also the closing film at the 2012 FrightFest Film Festival.

== Plot ==
One night in London, the 15-year-old Jimmy runs through a housing estate begging passers by for help. Everyone ignores him. He enters the condemned Tower Block 31 and finds his way to the top floor, which is the only floor that is still inhabited as the tenants wait to be rehoused. He bangs on doors as the two masked men who have been chasing him appear. The only person who helps him is office worker Becky, but she is beaten to the ground and he is dragged away. The next morning Detective Constable Devlin conducts door-to-door enquiries about the previous night's murder, as the boy's body has been found. Nobody will speak to him; not even Becky, who claims her injuries are the result of a mugging.

Three months later, Becky wakes up in her flat next to her colleague Ryan, with whom she has had a one-night stand following an office party. As they have breakfast, Ryan is suddenly shot in the head through the window. Becky flees into the hallway, along with the other residents, as all the flats have been targeted: young couple Amy and Jeff ; Carol and her teenaged computer game addict son Daniel ; chavvy single mother Jenny; middle-aged former soldier Neville and his wife Violet; small-time drug dealers Gary and Mark; lonely alcoholic Paul; and the violent petty criminal Kurtis, who extorts protection money from his neighbours. Amy, Jeff, and Mark are wounded. As well as Ryan, Carol's husband, Brian, and Jenny's two young children have already been killed by the sniper. Amy too soon succumbs to her injuries despite the best efforts of Violet, who is a first aider. The phones and internet have stopped working. The walls and doors are covered by homemade posters bearing three emoticons. Daniel, who has learned about such things from computer games, says that the sniper knows what he is doing and is using a high-powered military-grade rifle.

The fire escape is exposed to the sniper's gunfire, so they force open the lift door. It is boobytrapped with a shotgun, however, which kills Jeff. Becky, Kurtis, and Paul climb down the lift shaft, but discover the ground-floor exit door has been blocked with a skip and return to the top floor. Jenny suggests the emoticons symbolise the three wise monkeys and that the sniper is targeting them because they let Jimmy be killed and refused to speak to the police about it. She then walks into her flat to be shot dead alongside her children.

The largest of the posters has been stuck on the door of the flat occupied by Gary and Mark. Kurtis forces them to admit that they were the two masked men who chased and beat Jimmy because he had withheld money from them after they used him as a drug courier; they claim they did not mean to kill him. Nevertheless, Kurtis forces them into the flat where the sniper kills both of them.

Believing they can now leave because Jimmy's killers are dead, Carol runs down the fire escape, followed by Daniel. The sniper lets them reach the ground and then kills both of them. It is now obvious that he intends to execute all of them for refusing to help the police. The survivors have now been trapped for two days. They hatch a plan to tie all the building's fire hoses together and for one of them to climb down to the ground from the roof on the far side, where the sniper cannot see. Paul, an alcoholic volunteers to go after having a drink to suppress his DT's. Violet opens the door to the roof and is killed by another shotgun boobytrap. Becky, Kurtis, and Paul climb to the roof and secure the hoses, and Paul begins to climb down. The sniper, however, shoots the top of the hose until it breaks, and Paul falls to his death. Becky and Kurtis barely manage to get back inside.

As a final act of desperation, the three survivors set fire to the top floor, hoping someone will see the fire and alert the emergency services. They then climb down the lift shaft. Kurtis falls and breaks his leg. Property developer Kevin and his assistant Eddie arrive and spot the flames, but before they can call the fire brigade, the gunman shoots them both at close range. He then enters the building after throwing in a smoke grenade. Becky sneaks out and finds a nail gun in Kevin's pick-up truck. Using this the three survivors manage to subdue the gunman and remove his mask, only to discover it is DC Devlin, who has cracked after endless lack of assistance in the cases he is investigating. After a struggle, Becky kills him with the nail gun and the survivors walk outside with the sound of approaching sirens.

== Cast ==
- Sheridan Smith as Becky
- Jack O'Connell as Kurtis
- Ralph Brown as Neville
- Russell Tovey as Paul
- Jill Baker as Violet
- Loui Batley as Amy
- Steven Cree as DC Devlin
- Nabil Elouahabi as Gary
- Christopher Fulford as Kevin
- Julie Graham as Carol
- Tony Jayawardena as Eddie
- Jamie Thomas King as Ryan
- Ralph Laurila as Jimmy
- Michael Legge as Jeff
- Montserrat Lombard as Jenny
- Jordan Long as Ormond
- Harry McEntire as Daniel
- Kane Robinson as Mark
- James Weber Brown as Brian
- Caroline Artiss as Liz

== Critical reception ==
The film-critics aggregator Rotten Tomatoes reports a rating of 47% based on 17 reviews, with a weighted average score of 5/10. Simon Crook of Empire rated the film 3 out of 5, stating, "An unusual, scuzzy setting for a thriller that delivers with brutal simplicity", Sky Cinema also giving it 3 out of 5, and Phelim O'Neill of The Guardian 2 out of 5, who wrote that: "It's not a bad idea for a movie, but what we get is undercooked, with poor logic and even poorer pacing conspiring to prevent any much-needed tension to build." Jordan Mintzer of The Hollywood Reporter wrote from the Berlin International Film Festival: "Making up for its high concept/low brainpower scenario with some nifty action sequences and energetic performances, this rather promising directorial debut from duo James Nunn and Ronnie Thompson should foreclose at genre fests and ancillary outings worldwide." Allan Hunter for the Daily Express "It doesn't sound like a great premise but this is surprisingly taut and involving thanks to some resourceful film-making and eye-catching acting." Film4's Terry Mulcahy stated that, "Despite its relative simplicity, Tower Block packs a punch that's best experienced fresh - so steer clear of spoilers!" heDD Magazine reviewed the film, stating that it is, "Easily the best British film for 2012", with the Sunday Times, Starburst, and Box Office Buzz giving it 4 out of 4 stars, with Box Office Buzz stating that it is a "brutal ride of suspense and tension."
