= Lock, Stock... =

British television series

- Genre: Crime drama
- Created by: Guy Ritchie
- Based on: Lock, Stock and Two Smoking Barrels by Guy Ritchie
- Written by: Chris Baker; Andrew Day; Bernard Dempsey; Kevin McNally
- Directed by: Nick Jones; Rudolf Mestdagh; David Thacker; Sheree Folkson
- Starring: Ralph Brown; Daniel Caltagirone; Scott Maslen; Shaun Parkes; Del Synnott; Christopher Adamson; Lorraine Chase; Lisa Rogers
- Composer: John Lunn
- Country of origin: United Kingdom
- Original language: English
- No. of seasons: 1
- No. of episodes: 7

Production
- Executive producers: Guy Ritchie; Matthew Vaughn; Chris Evans
- Producer: Tony Wood
- Cinematography: Tim Palmer; Katie Swain
- Editors: Nick Arthurs; St. John O'Rorke; Sue Wyatt
- Running time: 50 minutes (series); 90 minutes (pilot)
- Production companies: Ginger Productions; SKA Films

Original release
- Network: Channel 4
- Release: 29 May – 11 July 2000

Lock, Stock... is a seven-part British television crime drama series, co-written and created by Guy Ritchie, as a spin-off from his 1998 film Lock, Stock and Two Smoking Barrels. The series first broadcast on Channel 4 on 29 May 2000 with a feature-length pilot, Lock, Stock and Four Stolen Hooves.

The series stars Daniel Caltagirone, Del Synnott, Scott Maslen and Shaun Parkes as close friends Moon, Jamie, Bacon and Lee, who run The Lock, a public house in London. Each episode focuses on the four friends attempting a different business venture, and the comedy of errors that ensues. Ralph Brown also stars as local gangland boss Miami Vice.

== Production ==
Lock, Stock... was Ginger Productions' first commission for television. The series prominently featured the use of the rhyming slang of London's East End, making it harder for some viewers to comprehend. In Australia, the series first aired in 2001 on ABC. In Portugal, the series first aired in 2005 on cable channel SIC Radical. In Germany, the series first aired on cable channel RTL Crime in 2011, under the title Bube, Dame, König, grAS (which in turn, is the German title of Lock, Stock and Two Smoking Barrels).

== Release ==
A soundtrack album featuring music used in the series was issued on 9 June 2000 via Virgin Records. The complete series was released on DVD Universal Studios for Region 2 on 4 December 2000. The series was later released by Siren Visual Entertainment for Region 4 in Australia. The series is also available to purchase as a box-set on iTunes.

== Cast ==
=== Main cast ===
- Ralph Brown as Miami Vice, a local crime boss.
- Daniel Caltagirone as Moon, a chef and electronics expert.
- Scott Maslen as Jamie, a fast talker.
- Shaun Parkes as Bacon, who makes sure things run smoothly, or at least tries to.
- Del Synnott as Lee, a ladies man, who always has sex on his mind.
- Christopher Adamson as Three Feet, an enforcer working for Miami Vice.
- Lorraine Chase as Barbie
- Lisa Rogers as Tanya, a dancer at Lapland.

=== Recurring cast ===
- Mario Kalli as Kouros; proprietor of the Trojan Kebab House.
- George Antoni as Nefarious; a Cypriot who deals in anything shady from the back of the Trojan Kebab House.
- Martin Freeman as Jaap; a Dutch drug taker and general idiot.
- Chris Rowe as Johan
- Nicki Grosse as Laura
- Nikolaj Coster-Waldau as Jordi
- Nick Brimble as Uncle Derek
- Ian Brimble as Uncle Brian

== Episodes ==
No.	Title	Directed by	Written by	Original release date	UK viewers (millions)
1	"...and Four Stolen Hooves"	Sheree Folkson	Chris Baker, Andrew Day & Guy Ritchie	29 May 2000	3.57
The four owners of The Lock, a pub in London's East End, buy a quantity of stolen porn videos and a priceless watch. They think they are in the money but unbeknown to them all the goods were stolen from East London's toughest, hardest gangster, Miami Vice. Not surprisingly he wants his watch back and doesn't care about how he goes about recovering it. The gang have to get the goods back to Miami Vice without him suspecting their involvement, but get caught up in a heap of trouble involving lap dancers, an arsonist, a family of gypsies, and a stolen thoroughbred racehorse.
2	"...and Two Hundred Smoking Kalashnikovs"	Rudolf Mestdagh	Bernard Dempsey & Kevin McNally	6 June 2000	2.22
A friend of the lads and a 'local businessman', Robbie Rossi, offers them a large sum of money to pick up a delivery of some dodgy designer clothes. Everything goes well until the lads discover that they have been conned and steal the van back for themselves. When they open the van they find it full of Kalashnikov rifles bought in by Miami Vice to help him out in a turf war. Once more they find themselves on the wrong side of Miami's anger.
3	"...and a Fistful of Jack and Jills"	Nick Jones	Chris Baker & Andrew Day	13 June 2000	1.93
The boys are offered a hoard of sex pills on the cheap in return for making a few dodgy deliveries. Everything goes wrong when the pills turn out to be a duff batch and people start dying, and they have just sold a large batch of them to gangland boss, Larry Harmless. To make things even more complicated there are a group of Spaniards, two Dutch druggies and a car full of money floating around.
4	"...and Spaghetti Sauce"	Rudolf Mestdagh	Chris Baker & Andrew Day	20 June 2000	Under 1.78
The boys accidentally record over a consignment of porn tapes belonging to Deep Throat, a vicious and nasty criminal, while running off copies of a wedding video they made. With just three days to replace or pay for the missing films they use every idea they possibly can to make their own porn videos, so at least they will have something to give to Deep Throat when he comes calling on them.
5	"...and Two Sips"	Nick Jones	Bernard Dempsey & Kevin McNally	27 June 2000	2.04
Miami Vice is having accountant problems. Not only is someone skimming money from his operations, but Moira is holding out her 10% of Lapland. The boys unwittingly get involved and end up having to pay Miami £20,000 each. Jamie needs to borrow the money from his uncle and has to 'babysit' a friend of his uncle's called 'Two Sips' who is returning to England for a few days.
6	"...and One Big Bullock"	David Thacker	Chris Baker & Andrew Day	4 July 2000	Under 1.58
Miami Vice goes into the meat business and employs the lads to pick up a consignment being delivered by three psychotic Russians. Moon's country cousins get involved with them and a fight over a prize bull. Meanwhile a drug-crazed duo want their revenge on Miami and intend to get their own hands on the beef to exact it.
7	"...and a Good Slopping Out"	David Thacker	Chris Baker & Andrew Day	11 July 2000	Under 1.74
A criminal 'friend' has the key to Miami's safe and he wants it back, but said criminal has been caught by the police and is now in jail. Miami gets Barbie to file some trumped up charges, ensuring that Lee, Bacon and Jamie get sent to the same prison, and tells them that unless they get the key for him he will ensure that the charges will be made to stick.
