= Ryan Scott Weber =

American independent filmmaker (born 1980)

- Born: February 24, 1980 (age 46); Morristown, New Jersey
- Occupations: Independent filmmaker, director, writer

Ryan Scott Weber (born February 24, 1980) is an American independent filmmaker. He is known for his feature films and for playing drums in the New Jersey–based pop punk band Crash Romeo. He is also the co-creator of New Jersey Horror Con and Film Festival in Edison, New Jersey. His films include Mary Horror (2011), Sheriff Tom Vs. The Zombies(2012), Witches Blood (2014), and Pretty Fine Thing (2016). In 2013 Weber also wrote, produced and directed a TV series called Zombies Incorporated. His short films are The Legend of Zeke (2013) and "Ghouls Night Out"(2016). Born in Morristown, New Jersey he is a native of Bernardsville, New Jersey.
