= Hungry (film) =

James Nunn 2026 horror/action film

- Theatrical release poster
- Directed by: James Nunn
- Written by: James Nunn
- Produced by: Ben Jacques
- Starring: Madison Davenport; Tracey Bonner; Joaquim de Almeida; Michel Curiel; Samantha Coughlan; Olivia Bernstone; Jim Meskimen; River Codack
- Cinematography: Job Reineke
- Edited by: Richard Blackburn
- Music by: Austin Wintory
- Production company: Signature Entertainment
- Distributed by: Signature Entertainment
- Release date: June 3, 2026
- Running time: 93 minutes
- Country: United Kingdom
- Language: English

Hungry is a 2026 British survival thriller film written and directed by James Nunn. It stars Madison Davenport, Tracey Bonner, Joaquim de Almeida, Michel Curiel, Samantha Coughlan, Olivia Bernstone, Jim Meskimen and River Codack. The film follows vacationers on a bayou boat tour in Louisiana who end up fighting for their lives when a ferocious hippopotamus turns them into prey.

== Plot ==
While vacationing in New Orleans, Sistine—who is coping with her mother's illness and a recent job loss—and her best friend Hannah decide to take a discounted alligator-watching riverboat tour in the Louisiana swamplands. Before setting out, the tourists meet the tour guide, Rodrigo, and his boss, Walker, who briefly mentions historical attempts by international traders to introduce hippopotamuses to the region. Joining Sistine and Hannah on the tour are divorced businesswoman Dionne Edwards, nurse Sally, Sally's retired firefighter father Tim, and Sally's teenage son Mikey.

During the trip, Dionne secretly pays Rodrigo a $300 tip to take the boat several miles off the approved route to photograph a massive, famous alligator nicknamed "Big Ben." Entering a desolate section of the swamp, the group finds the area strangely devoid of wildlife before discovering Big Ben's savagely mutilated carcass. Suddenly, a massive hippopotamus attacks and overturns the riverboat. Dionne escapes by climbing a nearby tree, while the others scramble atop the capsized hull. Rodrigo is injured by the hippo's tusks. Sistine manages to recover an emergency kit from the water, and Sally treats Rodrigo's wounds, warning the group that the injury is severe and will become fatally infected without hospital care.

As night falls, the highly territorial hippo continues to stalk the stranded group. It attacks and kills Tim, followed shortly by Hannah. Meanwhile, Walker realizes Rodrigo's tour is hours late and sets out in a small motorboat to search for them. The remaining survivors devise a plan to ignite a protective ring of gasoline on the water's surface, allowing Sistine to dive under and retrieve the boat's emergency locator beacon. Rodrigo activates the beacon before passing out from his infected wounds. Walker tracks the signal and arrives, but Dionne initiates a fight with Rodrigo and accidentally pushes Mikey into the water, where he’s immediately killed by the hippo. Walker, seeing how his boat wouldn’t stand a chance against the animal, gets himself and the other passengers back into the trees. Despondent over witnessing the deaths of her father and son in quick succession, a catatonic Sally intentionally wades into the dark water and disappears into the dark swamp.

The hippo then attacks Walker's boat and bites his foot. Rodrigo, in his final moments, fires a tranquilizer dart at the beast, allowing Walker to swim to the riverbank with a severe leg wound.

Sistine convinces Dionne to cooperate, and they use tree branches to disturb the water, drawing the hippo away. Walker fends off the animal with a flare while Sistine secures his boat. Because the boat ran out of gas the moment he arrived, Walker, Sistine, and Dionne row to an abandoned alligator farm to take shelter. They discovered that hippos were farmed here during the 1910s as part of American Hippo Bill to feed the US population with Hippo meat during the meat shortage while using the Hippo to get rid of the invasive species of plant called water hyacinth and that the hippos had three generations of descendants. Outside the facility, they discover a baby hippo trapped underneath heavy metal fencing. Then immediately, an adult hippo arrives and kills Walker.

Dionne attempts to flee down a ladder but falls and breaks her leg. Sistine lights a fire to kill the adult hippo and climbs down to assist Dionne. Dionne tries to get to the boat, but the hippo returns, somehow surviving the fire, and crushes her against the metal cages, killing her. Realizing that this adult hippo is acting out of fierce protection for its offspring rather than territorial dominance, Sistine decides to remain behind to lift the fencing and free the trapped baby hippo. With its calf released, the adult hippo ceases its relentless assault, allowing Sistine to be rescued by a rescue helicopter that spotted the fire. She then sees the hippo and her offspring running around the Louisiana swamp, knowing the danger other people will face.

== Cast ==
- Madison Davenport as Sistine
- Tracey Bonner as Dionne
- Joaquim de Almeida as Walker
- Michel Curiel as Rodrigo
- Samantha Coughlan as Sally
- Olivia Bernstone as Hannah
- Jim Meskimen as Tim
- River Codack as Mikey
- Joe Azzopardi as Captain James
- Matthew Charlery-Smith as Jazz singer
- Maxime Durand as Tour guide

== Production ==
The film was announced in November 2024, with James Nunn directing and writing, Ben Jacques producing, and Marc Goldberg and Sarah Gabriel from Signature Films executive producing. Madison Davenport, Joaquim de Almeida, Tracey Bonner, Jim Meskimen, Samantha Coughlan, Olivia Bernstone, Michel Curiel, and River Codack were part of the cast. The film used practical effects for the hippo and for the swamp.

== Release ==
The film was released theatrically in the United States on June 3, 2026, before being released on VOD in the United States on June 23, 2026, via Aura Entertainment.

It was screened in Panorama section of the 59th Sitges Film Festival in October 2026.

== Reception ==
On the review aggregator website Rotten Tomatoes, 56% of 18 critics' reviews are positive, with an average rating of 5.60/10.

Chad Collins of Dread Central gave the film a rating of 3.5 out of 5 and wrote: James Nunn’s ferocious, wildly crowd-pleasing Hungry treats its killer hippo with the reverence (and brutality) she deserves.

Nathaniel Muir of AIPT gave the film a positive review and he wrote: All of the usual cuteness has been removed. This hippo is a gigantic killing machine. There are some great shots of the animal, but the best ones take the audience right into the hippo’s cavernous mouth.

Brian Orndorf of Blu-ray.com gave the film a negative feedback and a rating of 5 out of 10 and wrote: "Hungry" has a few technical achievements to keep it involving, but the overall lethargy of the offering is surprising to behold, with hippo attacks not prioritized by the production.

Alan French of FandomWire gave the film a rating of 4 out of 10 and he wrote: You can feel the premise stretch beyond its welcome.
