= One More Shot (2024 film) =

British film by James Nunn

- Film poster
- Directed by: James Nunn
- Screenplay by: Jamie Russell
- Story by: James Nunn
- Produced by: Ben Jacques
- Starring: Scott Adkins; Michael Jai White; Alexis Knapp; Tom Berenger
- Cinematography: Job Reineke
- Edited by: Liviu Jipescu
- Music by: Austin Wintory
- Production companies: Signature Films; Sky Cinema; Lypsinc Productions; Richmond Pictures
- Distributed by: Destination Films (United States); Sky Cinema; Signature Entertainment (United Kingdom)
- Release date: January 12, 2024 (United Kingdom)
- Running time: 102 minutes
- Countries: United Kingdom; United States
- Language: English

One More Shot (also known as One Shot 2) is a 2024 action thriller film. It is a direct sequel to One Shot (2021), and is followed by One Last Shot (2026). The film was directed by James Nunn and starring Scott Adkins, Michael Jai White, Alexis Knapp, and Tom Berenger. Like the original, it is edited to appear as if shot in a single, continuous take.

== Plot summary ==
After the black site in Poland falls victim to a devastating attack, Navy SEAL Jake Harris receives a crucial mission – to personally accompany terrorist suspect Amin Mansur to Washington, D.C. for intensive interrogation. However, as the intricate process of transferring the prisoner unfolds, they must divert from their intended secure military landing site, Andrews Air Force Base, and land in an unnamed civilian airport (later identified as "Washington/Baltimore Airport") in Baltimore instead. Chaos ensues when a formidable band of heavily armed and exceptionally skilled mercenaries unleashes a ruthless assault upon the unsuspecting airport grounds.

The mercenaries take over the airport, including the CCD cameras and the gate. Mansur has some information that they need, so they can't kill him. Three people – Mansur, his wife and Jake – hide in the airport terminals, and arrive at the location where Marshall is with his men. Mansur's wife, a doctor, helps people with their wounds.

Lomax insinuates that since Marshall was not in Poland during the first attack, he might be the mole. However, a video surfaces showing Lomax speaking in Arabic, indicating that she is in fact the mole. Besides, Mansur recognizes her as the voice on the phone – his handler.

Soon, Mansur is captured by the mercenaries, and Jake falls down the stairs unconscious. Marshall is also captured and says he was right about Lomax betraying the country, when she shoots him in the head. Lomax reveals her plan – if the threat is radioactive, all heads of DOD and NSA gather in one place, hence fingerprinting them and obtaining their biometric data gives her access to all defenses. Thus, this was not really a terror attack at all, but a ploy to take over the strategic defense of the United States.

Lomax tortures Mansur to get the serial number of the container with the radioactive material. Jake then wakes up, and kills a few more mercenaries, dressing up as one of them; he even takes Mansur's wife hostage and offers her to Lomax. She threatens to hit the wife before Mansur gives the number of the container. Mansur is asked to read a speech about taking revenge against America for waging war against Arabs. Lomax then shoots Mansur and he dies in his wife's arms. Jake disarms the mercenaries and frees the wife.

After a shootout, Jake calls Mulholland and tells him about Lomax. Agent Long arrives as Lomax is taken into custody. Long instructs Jake that a transport vehicle is waiting outside to take them to Mulholland.

== Cast ==
- Scott Adkins as Jake Harris
- Michael Jai White as Robert Jackson
- Alexis Knapp as Jennifer Lomax, a rogue Homeland agent
- Tom Berenger as Mike Marshall
- Waleed Elgadi as Amin Mansur
- Hannah Arterton as Hooper
- Meena Rayann as Niesha Mansur
- Jill Winternitz as Kelly Harris
- Neil Linpow as FBI Agent Long

== Production ==
On 17 February 2023, Scott Adkins revealed that he was working on a sequel to his 2021 action thriller One Shot.

Filming primarily took place during night time at London Stansted Airport after passengers had left the airport. A two-minute fight scene was filmed as a long take on-board the Stansted Airport Transit System. Additional filming took place at Port of Tilbury (Tilbury Docks).

== Release ==
The film was released in the United Kingdom on 12 January 2024 and the United States on 16 January 2024. Signature Entertainment acquired the rights in the United Kingdom, and Destination Films and Sony Pictures Home Entertainment acquired the rights in the United States.

== Reception ==
On the review aggregator website Rotten Tomatoes, 57% of 7 critics' reviews are positive.

== Sequel ==
According to James Nunn in an interview with London Beautiful Life, he announced his next project, One Last Shot, and said that filming will begin in late October 2025. The film will be released on 22 September 2026.
