= Save Yourself (film) =

- Theatrical film poster
- Directed by: Ryan M. Andrews
- Written by: Ryan M. Andrews; Mitchell Lackie
- Produced by: Ryan M. Andrews; Jessica Cameron; Emma Jean Sutherland
- Starring: Jessica Cameron; Tristan Risk; Ry Barrett; Elma Begovic
- Release date: 28 November 2015 (Blood in the Snow Canadian Film Festival)
- Running time: 91 minutes
- Country: Canada
- Language: English

Save Yourself is a 2015 horror-thriller directed by Ryan M. Andrews. The film stars Tristan Risk (American Mary) and Jessica Cameron and was released on 28 November 2015. The film won Best Horror Feature at the 2016 Bare Bones International Film Festival and was inspired by a road trip director Ryan M. Andrews took with writing partner Chris Cull, from Toronto to Oklahoma.

== Premise ==
Five female filmmakers en route to Los Angeles to a screening of their new horror film, experience real life terror when their paths cross with a maniacal scientist.

== Reception ==
The Toronto Film Scene says, "Director and co-writer Ryan M. Andrews has crafted the perfect kind of straight-up horror film that many viewers will remember growing up on..."
