= Jim Meskimen =

American actor (born 1959)

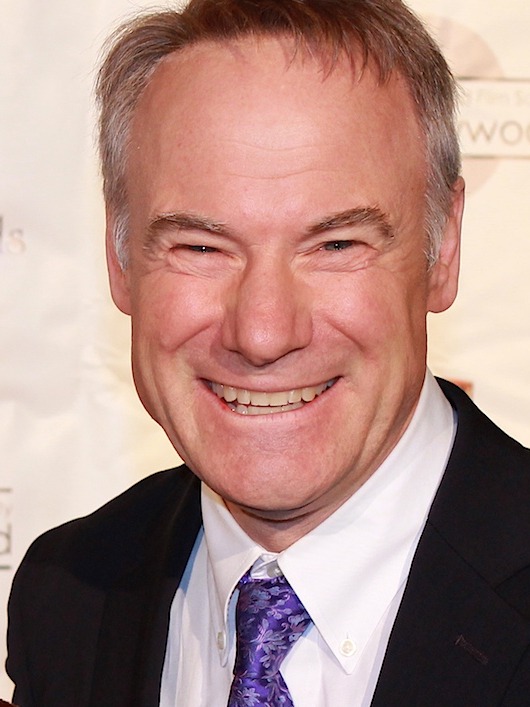
- Meskimen at the 2014 Annie Awards
- Born: James Ross Meskimen; September 10, 1959 (age 67); Santa Monica, California, U.S.
- Occupations: Actor; comedian; impressionist; visual artist
- Years active: 1984–present
- Spouse: Tamra Shockley (m. 1987)
- Children: Taylor Meskimen
- Parents: Freeman Meskimen (father); Marion Ross (mother)
- Website: www.jimmeskimen.com

Jim Meskimen (born September 10, 1959) is an American actor and comedian.

== Early life ==
Jim Meskimen is the son of Marion Ross. He attended Taft High in Woodland Hills, Los Angeles, where he met his wife, Tamra Shockley. He was the cartoonist for the school newspaper, and also acted in plays.

After high school, he attended the University of California, Santa Cruz (UCSC). Before that first year was over, he returned home for a time and received training in animation at Hanna-Barbera studios in Hollywood, under the apprenticeship of Harry Love.

Shortly after, he began working for producer Doug Wildey, who had created the original Jonny Quest series. Meskimen was assistant storyboard artist to veteran comic book artist Don Rico on the animated series, Jana of the Jungle.

After a season at Hanna-Barbera, in 1978 Meskimen returned to UCSC to study general subjects, painting, drawing and lithography. He also did parts in plays, but did not take classes in the Drama department, preferring to concentrate on his visual art education.

He studied art history in five courses with Jasper Rose, a fixture at UCSC, who later became the inspiration for an art historian character, Professor Knestor Jackdaws.

He studied painting with Eduardo Carrillo, a Mexican muralist and teacher, and sculpture with Hardy Hanson.

In 1980, Meskimen travelled to Galicia, Spain to begin a period of intensive training in classical painting with Argüello and a handful of other students. He returned in 1981 and resumed studies at UCSC, studying sculpture, printmaking and painting, as well as private training with Miguel, who continued teaching at the university.

When not painting, Meskimen participated in major theatrical productions in Santa Cruz, both at the university and in local theater.

After graduating UCSC In 1982 he returned with Argüello to Galicia, and resumed private studies.

== Career ==
In 1983, after living for a time in Madrid on his own, he had an encounter with actor Harvey Keitel and he decided to pursue acting, and moved to New York City.

In New York, he worked as a visual artist, doing illustrations, cartoons and commercial art for various companies. He landed a job designing characters for Rankin/Bass's original series ThunderCats, then in its first season. He worked with producer Jules Bass on expanding the story, and contributed to the ThunderCats "bible."

While working for Rankin/Bass, Meskimen visited one of the recording sessions with actors Bob McFadden, Earl Hammond, Peter Newman, Earl Hyman and others, and began working in radio and TV voiceovers.

He did hundreds of radio and television commercials, and became a series regular on the animated show The Comic Strip, produced by his old employer Rankin/Bass.

He became the voice of several brands in the 1980s and 1990s. He was the voice of the channel that became Comedy Central, (then named HA!) and did campaigns for Swatch Watch as Doctor Swatch, a character he created with marketing head Steven Rechtshaffner.

He became on-camera spokesman on television and radio commercials for Skaggs Alfa Beta grocery stores in 1986.

He worked as a man-on-the-street interviewer for banks, cars, retail chains and other clients, in spontaneous, off-the-cuff comedic campaigns that won dozens of industry awards. Among these were Schnucks Markets, Food Lion, and Kash & Karry.

During those New York years (1983-1993), Meskimen studied and performed improv with several companies, chiefly INTERPLAY and did hundreds of live shows at the National Improvisational Theatre on Eighth Avenue, Chelsea.

On the invitation of producers, he and fellow Interplay member Christopher Smith guest starred several times on Britain's Whose Line Is It, Anyway?

His first film role was in Ron Howard's The Paper, starring Michael Keaton.

In 1993, he moved home to LA with his family to start a career in TV and film, beginning with The Fresh Prince of Bel-Air and a role in director Ron Howard's Oscar-nominated Apollo 13. Howard cast Meskimen in no fewer than five feature films, including The Grinch and Frost/Nixon.

He appeared in an early episode of The Fresh Prince of Bel-Air as professor Jeremy Mansfield, who was loosely modeled after Robin Williams' character in the film Dead Poets Society.

In early 2003, he met Gregg and Evan Spiridellis, the brothers who founded JibJab Media. He voiced early hits, including Arnold for President, This Land, and Second Term. He continued to work with the Spiridellis brothers on their Emmy and BAFTA award-winning children's series Ask the StoryBots, and other projects.

He has appeared on major television programs; Friends, Fresh Prince of Bel Air, The Marvelous Mrs. Maisel, This is Us, SWAT, Hunters, NCIS, Parks & Recreation, Brooklyn Nine-Nine, Young Sheldon, The Big Bang Theory, to name but a few.

Meskimen's character voices have been heard on a number of video games and animated shows including Star Trek: Resurgence, Avengers Assemble, Batman: Arkham Asylum, Teenage Mutant Ninja Turtles, Shaggy & Scooby-Doo Get a Clue!, Pinky and the Brain, Phineas and Ferb, The Legend of Korra, and Avatar: The Last Airbender. He has voiced the Genie in Disney's Aladdin franchise since 2008.

His viral hit, Shakespeare in Celebrity Voices, brought him global attention on YouTube and led to many opportunities, including performing on America's Got Talent in 2013, where his improvised celebrity impressions at Radio City Music Hall earned him a standing ovation.

He has performed his live one-man show, JIMPRESSIONS, in Hollywood, Australia and the U.K.

In 2017, he wrote a screenplay for a short film, which became "Son to Son," and won festival awards. He starred in the short, with actor Nick Lane, with Taron Lexton directing.

His performance as the troubled, opioid addict father in "Son to Son" garnered praise; the UK Film Review said: "Meskimen delivers a tragically believable character in a short space of time to great effect."

He provided the voice of Colonel Harland Sanders for the KFC brand on radio, web and television ads for many years, starting in 2016.

As an audiobook narrator, he has worked on hundreds of titles for all major publishers and received awards for his narration.

Directing multi-cast audiobooks for Galaxy Audio was his full-time job from 2005 to 2009, when he worked as senior director to complete hundreds of hours of audio of the fiction work of L. Ron Hubbard.

The multi-cast production of "Battlefield Earth, a Saga of the Year 3000," which Meskimen directed and performed in, won an Audie Award in 2017.

He appeared on "America's Got Talent" as a celebrity impressionist in 2013 and as a finalist performed at Radio City Music Hall, NYC, receiving a standing ovation.

Since 2020, he has played roles on television in Gaslit with Sean Penn and Julia Roberts, Hunters, and as the recurring character of Cary Hubbard in Apple TV+'s The Big Door Prize, opposite Chris O'Dowd.

== Personal life ==
He lives in Los Angeles with his wife Tamra, who is a co-founder of The Acting Center, an acting school and performance venue in Sherman Oaks, California. They have one daughter, actress, singer and award-winning audio book narrator Taylor Meskimen.

Meskimen is a practicing Scientologist.

== Filmography ==
=== Film ===
Year	Title	Role	Notes	Ref(s)
1995	Gordy	Bill Clinton	Voice role Film debut role	
1995	Apollo 13	TELMU White		
1996	Jingle All the Way	Officer at Parade		
1999	My Neighbors the Yamadas	Additional voices	English American version	
1999	Alvin and the Chipmunks Meet Frankenstein	Mr. Yesman	Voice role Direct-to-video	
2000	Battlefield Earth	Blythe		
2000	How the Grinch Stole Christmas	Officer Wholihan		
2000	Our Lips Are Sealed	Rick Parker	Direct-to-video	
2004	The Punisher	Accountant		
2008	Justice League: The New Frontier	Slam Bradley	Voice role Direct-to-video	
2008	Batman: Gotham Knight	Deadshot James Gordon	Voice role Direct-to-video	
2010	Justice League: Crisis on Two Earths	Red Archer, Captain Super	Voice role	
2010	Quantum Quest: A Cassini Space Odyssey	Ignorance	Voice role	
2011	Transformers: Dark of the Moon	John F. Kennedy	Voice role; uncredited	
2012	Justice League: Doom	King	Voice role; direct-to-video	
2012	Batman: The Dark Knight Returns Pt. 1	General Briggs	Voice role; direct-to-video	
2012	Big Top Scooby-Doo!	Detective, Phil Flaxman	Voice role; direct-to-video	
2012	Batman: The Dark Knight Returns Pt. 2	Ronald Reagan	Voice role; direct-to-video	
2013	I Know That Voice	Himself	Documentary	
2015	Justice League: Gods and Monsters	Victor Fries	Voice role; direct-to-video	
2017	Gore	Johnny Carson	Unreleased	
2019	Batman vs. Teenage Mutant Ninja Turtles	Commissioner Gordon, Scarecrow	Voice role; direct-to-video	
2020	Superman: Red Son	Dwight D. Eisenhower, John F. Kennedy	Voice role; direct-to-video	
2021	All Those Small Things	Brian		
2021	Bad Detectives	Mr. Strathmore		
2022	Beavis and Butt-Head Do the Universe	NASA Director Ogilvie, Extraction Team Leader, Prisoners	Voice role	
2023	Sweetwater	Desk Clerk		
2023	Once Upon a Studio	Merlin, Eeyore	Voice role; short film	
2025	War of the Worlds	President of the United States		
2026	Hungry †	Tim	Video on Demand	

=== Television ===
Year	Title	Role	Notes	Ref(s)
1985–1989	ThunderCats	—N/a	125 episodes Secondary character designer	
1988–2011	Whose Line Is it Anyway?	Himself		
1993–1996	The Fresh Prince of Bel-Air	Jeremy Mansfield, Werner	4 episodes	
1996	3rd Rock from the Sun	Alan	Episode: "Big Angry Virgin from Outer Space"	
1996	Pinky and the Brain	Bob Dole	Voice role; episode: "The Pink Candidate"	
1996–1997	The Real Adventures of Jonny Quest	Dr. Vedder, various voices	Voice role; 6 episodes	
1997	Superman: The Animated Series	Danny the Janitor	Voice role; episode: "Double Dose"	
2001	Even Stevens	Dr. Dean	Episode: "Thin Ice"	
2002	Malcolm in the Middle	Waiter	Episode: "Hal's Birthday"	
2002	Justice League	Knight	Voice role; episode: "A Knight of Shadows"	
2003	Time Squad	George W. Bush, George H. W. Bush	Voice role; episode: "Orphan Substitute"	
2003	Friends	Bill	Episode: "The One Where Ross Is Fine"	
2004	All Grown Up!	Skeleton, Dr. Cartunian	Voice role; episode: "The Old & the Restless"	
2004	Johnny Bravo	Whiny Man, Derek, Waiter #1	Voice role; episode: "It's a Magical Life/The; Hunk at the End of This Cartoon"	
2004	The Adventures of Jimmy Neutron, Boy Genius	Quentin Smithee	Voice role; episode: "Lights! Camera! Danger!"	
2005	The Grim Adventures of Billy & Mandy	Narrator, Old Man, Chubby Employee	Voice role Episode: "Runaway Pants/Scythe 2.0"	
2005–2014	The Boondocks	Bill O'Reilly, Ronald Reagan, Anchorman, News Reporter, Chris Hansen	21 episodes	
2005–2008	Avatar: The Last Airbender	Fire Nation soldier, Jee, How, Avatar Kuruk, additional voices	10 episodes	
2006	Robot Chicken	Frank, Jon Corzine, Heimlich's Father, Sorting Hat	Voice role; 2 episodes	
2006	Two and a Half Men	Gangster	Episode: "The Sea Is a Harsh Mistress"	
2006–2008	Shaggy & Scooby-Doo Get a Clue!	Agent 1, Robi	Voice role	
2007	The Batman	Chuck	Voice role; episode: "Joker Express"	
2007	Random! Cartoons	Thom Cat, John, Stumpy	Voice role; episode: "Thom Cat"	
2007–2011	Back at the Barnyard	Goraldo	Voice role; 2 episodes	
2009–2015	Parks and Recreation	Martin Housely, Clown, Man	7 episodes	
2010	G.I. Joe: Renegades	Norton, News Reporter, S.W.A.T. M.P.	Voice role; episode: "The Descent: Part 2"	
2010	Rules of Engagement	Mr. Wrigley	Episode: "Rug-o-War"	
2011	Victorious	Doctor	Episode: "Tori Gets Stuck"	
2011	Kickin' It	Principal Bucket	Episode: "Dojo Daycare"	
2011–2012	ThunderCats	Aburn, Ponzi, Dog Constable, Vendor	Voice role; 6 episodes	
2012	Community	Christopher Walken / Tommy Lee Jones Impersonator	Episode: "Contemporary Impressionists"	
2012–2014	Kung Fu Panda: Legends of Awesomeness	Emissary, Master Kweng, Shying Tree, Guardian #1	Voice role; 3 episodes	
2012–2017	Teenage Mutant Ninja Turtles	Carlos Chiang O'Brien Gambeg, General Griffen, EPF Commander #2	Voice role 10 episodes	
2013	Anger Management	Daniel	Episode: "Charlie Breaks Up with Kate"	
2013–2014	The Legend of Korra	Bataar, Daw, Avatar Kuruk	Voice role; 11 episodes	
2013–2014	Hot in Cleveland	Professor Zucker	2 episodes	
2014–2017	Avengers Assemble	Ultron, Arsenal, Scientist Supreme, Roxxon Guard	Voice role; 13 episodes	
2015	Lego Marvel Super Heroes: Avengers Reassembled	Ultron	Voice role; television short	
2015	The Big Bang Theory	Doctor, Man, Las Vegas Wedding Minister	2 episodes	
2017	The Loud House	Ted, Manager, Junkyard Guy, Announcer	Voice, 2 episodes	
2018	Constantine: City of Demons	Beroul	Voice role; episode: "#1.5"	
2018	Family Guy	Ron Howard	Voice role; episode: "Griffin Winter Games"	
2018	The Good Place	Bertram Varmin	Episode: "Rhonda, Diana, Jake, and Trent"	
2018	NCIS	Farrel Emerson	Episode: "Destiny's Child"	
2019	The Kids Are Alright	Johnny Carson	Voice role; episode: "Mike's Award"	
2019	Good Omens	George H. W. Bush	Voice role; episode: "In the Beginning"	
2021	Brooklyn Nine-Nine	Deputy Chief Williams	2 episodes	
2024	Rock, Paper, Scissors	Abraham Lincoln	Voice role; episode: "Pencil Comes Over/The Wind"	
2024	Night Court	Shot Clock Showdown	Episode: "Chips Ahoy"	
2025	Beavis and Butt-Head	Dr. Rod Johnson	Voice role; episode "Depositors"	
2026	Margo's Got Money Troubles	Dr. Porter	Episode: "The Hungry Ghost"	

=== Video games ===
- Armored Core V – Jack Batty, Men of Honor Unit B, Zodiac No. 8
- Baldur's Gate – Edwin Odesseiron, Jebadoh, Khalid, Thaldorn
- Baldur's Gate II: Shadows of Amn – Edwin Odesseiron
- Baldur's Gate II: Throne of Bhaal – Edwin Odesseiron, Khalid
- Batman: Arkham City – Officer Tom Miller
- Batman: Arkham Knight – Additional voices
- Batman: Arkham Origins – SWAT Officers, Cops
- Call of Duty: Black Ops – John F. Kennedy
- Call of Duty: Black Ops 2 – Secretary of Defense David Petraeus
- Command & Conquer 4: Tiberian Twilight – Various
- Destroy All Humans! 2 – Additional voices
- Diablo III – Additional voices
- Diablo III: Reaper of Souls – Additional voices
- Disney Infinity 3.0 – Ultron
- Disney Think Fast – Genie
- Disney Speedstorm – Genie
- Epic Mickey – Voice
- Epic Mickey 2: The Power of Two – Mad Doctor
- EverQuest II – Guild Patron Volarian, Baron Zafimus, Sergeant-at-Arms Ironcast, Commission Deputy Halford, Naturalist Tummyfill, Borthen, Amren Talbot, Morte Winghammer, Green Hood Trap Master, Banker Izark, Ubani, Overseer Travog
- Fantastic 4 – Doctor Doom, Additional voices
- Final Fantasy XIII-2 – Additional voices
- Five Nights at Freddy's: Secret of the Mimic – Edwin Murray, Mr. Helpful, Sleepy Moon, M2 / The Mimic (mimicking Edwin)
- Gothic 3 – Additional voices
- Grand Theft Auto VI - The Local Population
- Hitman: Blood Money – Additional voices
- Kinect Disneyland Adventures – Genie
- Kingdom Hearts HD 2.5 Remix – Genie (Kingdom Hearts Re:coded cinematics)
- Lego Jurassic World – Additional voices
- Lego The Lord of the Rings – Various
- Lightning Returns: Final Fantasy XIII – Additional voices
- Madagascar: The Video Game – Albino Crocodile, Guard, Jogger, Sailor
- Marvel Dimension of Heroes – Ultron
- Marvel vs. Capcom: Infinite – Ultron, Ultron Sigma, Ultron Omega
- Marvel Ultimate Alliance 3: The Black Order – Ultron, Ultimo
- Marvel Rivals – Ultron
- MAG – SVER Executive
- Minecraft Story Mode – Milo
- Nickelodeon All-Star Brawl – Nigel Thornberry (voiceover added in the June 2022 update)
- Nickelodeon All-Star Brawl 2 – Nigel Thornberry
- Robots – Ratchet, additional voices
- Shark Tale: The Video Game – Lino, Additional Tenant Fish
- Shrek the Third – Captain Hook, Attendant 2, Geek
- Skylanders: Trap Team – Additional voices
- Sorcerers of the Magic Kingdom – Genie
- Syndicate – Additional voices
- Teenage Mutant Ninja Turtles: Mutants in Manhattan – Wingnut, Stone Warriors
- The Lego Movie Videogame – Batman, Additional voices
- The Lord of the Rings: The Battle for Middle-earth II – Elven King Thranduil
- The Lord of the Rings: The Battle for Middle-earth II - The Rise of the Witch-king – King Thranduil
- Trails in the Sky 1st Chapter – Albert Russell
- Ultimate Spider-Man – Additional voices

=== Internet ===
- Jib Jab – George W. Bush, John Kerry, John McCain

=== Music ===
- Bugs Bunny and Friends Sing The Beatles – Elmer Fudd
