= Human Hibachi 2: Feast in the Forest =

2022 American Found footage film

- Official release poster
- Directed by: Mario Cerrito
- Written by: Mario Cerrito
- Produced by: Jeff Alpert; Steve Sousa; Christina Krosche
- Starring: Jeff Alpert; Frank Volpe; Nick Brennan; Aliyah Batot; Wataru Nishida; Ray Bolden
- Cinematography: Mario Cerrito
- Music by: Victor Niglio
- Distributed by: Troma Entertainment
- Release date: January 1, 2022
- Running time: 83 minutes
- Country: United States
- Language: English
- Budget: $25,000

Human Hibachi 2: Feast in the Forest is a 2022 found footage horror film written and directed by Mario Cerrito and the second installment of the Human Hibachi series. The film was acquired by Troma Entertainment and released in April 2023 to video on demand.

== Premise ==
Set in the deep woods, a cannibal family obsessed with the first "Human Hibachi" video have made it their life's mission to find the only two individuals left from it. If successful, they vow to provide them with the most elaborate feast imaginable.

== Cast ==
- Frank Volpe as Steve Hunt
- Nicholas Brennan as Jacob Burnside
- Aliyah Batot as Lisa Franklin
- Raymond Bolden as Henry Hunt
- Julie Chapin as Gloria Hunt

== Production of film ==
The film was shot in 2021 in New Jersey.

== Distribution ==
The film premiered at Playhouse West Theatre in Philadelphia, Pennsylvania in July 2022. It won a best feature film award at New Jersey Horror Con and Film Festival in Atlantic City. It was released by Troma Entertainment on their Troma Now platform. The movie was also acquired by Kings Of Horror for release. The movie was released to FOUND TV on November 29, 2024.

Tubi released the film in May of 2026.

== Critical response ==
The Rotting Zombie gave it a 6/10 and says "There are of course scenes of violence, with such fun highlights as a man being forced to cut off his own private part (subsequently used by his captors for fishing!), and a fun first person perspective from a victim who is getting sawn up with a chainsaw."

Also addressing some negatives, "The found footage idea is used for all the shots here, though sometimes that doesn't make sense within the context of the film, with both the footage actually being shot mixed in, along with first person perspective sequences from people that aren't actually filming anything. Much of the first half of the horror has the redneck brothers out in the woods capturing and cooking unsuspecting victim."

Horror Society gave the film a 3/5 and wrote, "Overall, Human Hibachi 2: Feast in the Forest is something I would highly recommend to watch with a group of friends and plenty of beer. It’s not perfect but it’s fun which is all you can ask for with a movie that has no budget. Check this one out."

Critic from "Search my Trash" Mike Haberfelner writes, "So in all, it's certainly not a movie for everyone, but for people into explicit horror it's most certainly a good watch, and more than just another gorefest."
