= Jessica Cameron =

Canadian actress and film director

- Born: Owen Sound, Ontario, Canada
- Education: Ryerson University
- Occupations: horror film actress, director, screenwriter, and producer

Jessica Cameron is a Canadian horror film actress, director, screenwriter, and producer.

== Early life ==
Cameron was born in Owen Sound, Ontario where she graduated high school before moving to Toronto to study fashion at Ryerson University. She worked as a Fashion designer through, after taking an acting class, and being bitten hard by that bug. Cameron decided to make acting her full-time career.

== Career ==
Cameron secured a job as a clothing designer in Ohio where she lived for a few years. After taking an acting class through her work, she was selected for a role in the movie The Dead Matter (2010) which was filmed in 2008. Cameron won the award for "Rising Movie Star" from the 2010 Golden Cobb Awards. Cameron co-starred in the Roger Corman produced SyFy Channel movie Camel Spiders (2011) and the remake Silent Night (2012) which starred veteran actor Malcolm McDowell. She acted in several independent productions in the Midwestern United States before making the move to Los Angeles to pursue acting full-time.

Cameron played herself on the TLC series Brides of Beverly Hills (2011-2012). She runs Small Town Girl Productions, a production company primarily producing genre films, and in 2013 directed her first film, Truth or Dare. Eight months later, she directed Mania, which was part of the documentary film series Kill The Production Assistant. Cameron has also appeared in comic books, music videos, and TV shows and was named "Scream queen of the Month" by ScreamQueen.com. She was 2015 Guest of Manchester based Grimmfest, where her film Truth or Dare had its European premiere.

== Filmography ==
=== Film ===
Year	Title	Role	Notes
2008	Solitude of Love	Jennifer	Short
2009	The Wrong Damn Thing to Say	Jane	Short
2009	Absolution	Tori	Short
2010	Waiting Fear	Moon	Short
2010	The Dead Matter	Female Victim	
2010	Loki and SageKing Go to GenCon	Herself	Short
2010	Mr. Hush	Julie	
2010	Resurrection	Lenore	
2010	Next	Young Wife	Short
2010	Ninety Degrees and Sunny	-	Short
2011	Hell-O-Ween	Megan	
2011	Camel Spiders	Ashley	TV movie
2011	Accomplice	Jess	Short
2011	Orange You Super?	Vlogger #2	Short
2011	Breakfast Impossible: Series One	Gnarla Foxx	
2011	Potpourri	Princess Areola	
2011	God Don't Make the Laws	Waitress	
2011	Death of the Dead	Bambi	Video
2011	Deadly Dares: Truth or Dare Part IV	Dara	Video
2011	The Family	Laura	
2012	The Sleeper	Cindy	
2012	Zombiewood	Zusan	Short
2012	The Black Dahlia Haunting	Young Norma Jeane Baker	
2012	Silent Night	Nurse	
2012	Strain	Waitress	Short
2013	Intrusive Behavior	Tabitha	
2013	Truth or Dare	Jennifer Collins	
2013	Crazy About Seven Little Deaths	-	Short
2013	13/13/13	Receptionist	
2013	To Jennifer	Jennifer	
2013	American Girls	Lauren Hammond	
2013	Hello Hero: Holding Out for a Hero	Screaming Woman	Short
2013	Seven Little Deaths	Pali	
2013	Witches Brew	Mom	Short
2013	Post Mortem, America 2021	Maggie	
2014	WiH Massive Blood Drive PSA	Driver	Short
2014	Virginia Obscura	-	
2014	The Tour	Morgan	Short
2014	Run Like Hell	Jennafer	
2014	A Grim Becoming	Life	
2014	Klymene	Klymene	Short
2015	Black Angels	-	Short
2015	The Evil Gene	Amanda	
2015	All Through The House	Sheila	
2015	Save Yourself	Kim Tobin	
2016	South32	Michelle	
2016	Unwanted Guest	Shannon	TV movie
2017	Red Eye	Bea	
2017	American Guinea Pig: The Song of Solomon	Mary	
2017	Buckout Road	Seppuku Suicide	
2018	An Ending	Florence	
2019	The Listing	Jenna	
2019	Puppet Killer	Vengeance/Reporter	
2019	Slice & Dice	Dr. Weaver	Short
2019	The Tombs	Harriet	
2019	Rest Stop	Ellen	Short
2020	Human Zoo	Contestant 103	
2020	Camp Twilight	JoAnn Warner	
2020	Breakdown	Melissa	
2020	Make It a Scary One	Morgan	
2020	The Sunday Night Slaughter	Doctor Mika St. Jean	
2021	Shelter in Place	Karen	
2021	Crypto Heads	Brooke O'Hara	
2022	Rucker	Darlene #48	
2022	Final X: The Final Experiment	Cynthia Bradshaw	Short
2022	Lilith	Heidi Cruz	
2022	Satanic Hispanics	Lobby Victim #2	
2022	Shelter	Karen	
2023	Transmission	Sitcom Wife	
2024	Those Who Inherit the Earth	Heather	
2024	The Haunted, the Possessed and the Damned	Vanessa Collins	

=== Television ===
Year	Show	Role	Notes
2012	Brides of Beverly Hills	Bridal Stylist	TLC channel reality show
2011-12	Two Doors Down	Summer Perkins	TV series; all 13 episodes
2011	The Funny Man	Mildred	TV series; ep. 1-9
2011	Aidan 5	Rachel	TV / web series; 2 ep.
2011	Caught: The Web Series	Narria 'Dix' Dixon	Web series; 1 episode
-	Night Out Ohio	Host	TV series; 2 episodes

=== Music videos ===
Year	Title	Artist	Role
2011	"We Live Our Lives in Black"	Coyote	Herself
2020	"How to Induce Amnesia"	Herself	Cheating Girlfriend
