= Human Hibachi =

2021 American Found footage film

- Directed by: Mario Cerrito
- Written by: Mario Cerrito
- Produced by: Dave Alemi; Jeff Alpert; Mario Cerrito
- Starring: Wataru Nishida; Andrew Hunsicker; Jeff Alpert; K. Andrew Deffley; Carley Harper; Sheyla Hershey
- Cinematography: Mario Cerrito
- Edited by: Mario Cerrito
- Music by: Andrew Mendolia
- Distributed by: Troma Entertainment
- Release dates: October 2019 (New Jersey Horror Con and Film Festival); October 23, 2020
- Running time: 91 minutes
- Country: United States
- Language: English

Human Hibachi is a 2019 American found footage horror film, written and directed by Mario Cerrito. It was selected by the New Jersey Horror Con and Film Festival and Philadelphia Independent Film Festival, and went on to win 2021 best feature film at the former. The film has garnered a cult following and has been referred to as a modern-day underground cult classic.

== Plot ==
Chronicling a woman's 35th birthday party from start to finish, which ends in her gruesome demise, several rich cannibals frequent a Japanese owned restaurant and pay for the owner to prepare their victims for consumption.

== Cast ==
- Wataru Nishida as Jin Yamamoto
- Andrew Hunsicker as John Mitchell
- Stafford Chavis as Bobby Shields
- Carley Harper as Meghan Cole
- Sheyla Hershey as Adriana
- Jeff Alpert as Doug Patrick
- K. Andrew Deffley as Officer Hutchinson
- John Campanile as Phil Maxwell
- Elizabeth Gaynor as Katie Williams

== Production ==
The movie was shot in the summer of 2018 in Riverside, New Jersey and at The Reef, a restaurant in Wilmington, Delaware.

== Release ==
The film was said to have been too extreme for Amazon and released to its own website on October 23, 2020. Afterwards the movie was released by Lloyd Kaufman and Michael Herz's Troma Entertainment on their streaming service Troma Now on VHX.

The film was later released to Troma Now by Troma Entertainment in 2021. It was later released on a wider scale by Invincible Pictures including Amazon Prime Video. In August 2022 the movie was ranked #79 in the top 100 best selling horror titles on Amazon. Invincible Pictures represented the movie at Marché du Film which took place at the 2023 Cannes Film Festival. A Director's cut of the film was released by Scareplex's Video on demand platform in 2023. The movie was released to FOUND TV on November 29, 2024.

== Reception ==
PopHorror.com calls Human Hibachi a "modern day tale of cannibalism and that in itself makes the film rather unique".

Horror Society says, "Finally, the film doesn’t shy away from the red stuff but its use of meat is what sends it over the edge. The film has several scenes with plenty of blood but it makes use of a restaurant to work in the meat for the cannibal angle. This really makes the story work while using real meat."

Horror News quoted "At its heart (& lungs, & stomach), it is a cannibal movie but it much deeper than that. There is a well-crafted story there that leads us into the madness and mayhem. It's a smart movie that doesn't just rely on mindless gore for cheap thrills."

Horror News Net placed the movie in their top ten essential found footage films list.

Grimoire of Horror gave the film a 3.5 out of 5 saying, "While it has its limitations, it’s clear why the feature has gained a cult following and is a fantastic first entry in the trilogy."

Nerdly.co.uk notes Human Hibachi is a brilliant play on the old “video nasty” era belief that snuff movies are real too.
