= Truth or Dare (2013 film) =

- Directed by: Jessica Cameron
- Written by: Jessica Cameron; Jonathan Scott Higgins
- Starring: Jessica Cameron; Ryan Kiser; Heather Dorff
- Cinematography: Chase Jonathan Azimi
- Edited by: Aaron M. Lane; Brian Weber
- Music by: Dustin Richardson
- Production company: Small Town Girl Productions
- Release date: September 13, 2013 (Arizona Underground Film Festival)
- Running time: 84 minutes
- Country: United States
- Language: English

Truth or Dare is a 2013 American horror film and the directorial debut of Jessica Cameron, who also starred in, wrote, and produced the film. The movie had its world premiere on 13 September 2013 at the Arizona Underground Film Festival, where it also won Best Horror Feature. Truth or Dare centers upon a group of college students that publish YouTube videos that gain them not only worldwide infamy but also an obsessed fan turned deadly stalker.

== Plot ==
Jennifer (Jessica Cameron), Ray (Shelby Stehlin), Courtney (Devanny Pinn), Michelle (Heather Dorff), Tony (Brandon Van Vliet), and John (Jesse Wilson) are all members of a group named the "Truth or Dare-Devils". They're known for their outrageous YouTube videos where they take the party game Truth or Dare? to extreme levels, which eventually gains them significant media attention and a decent fan following. It is at one of their guest appearances that they have a confrontation with Derik (Ryan Kiser), an obsessed fan that is angry that they haven't responded to all of his e-mails. He's also upset that there are elements of the group's videos that have been faked for dramatic effect and the scenes of gore and violence aren't real. The group ultimately dismisses Derik as just an over-the-top obsessed fan and heads to John's home to rest, only to become horrified when they realize that Derik has followed them and is intent on making new Truth or Dare-Devils videos that are all too real.

== Cast ==
- Jessica Cameron as Jennifer Collins
- Ryan Kiser as Derik B. Smith
- Heather Dorff as Michelle Lucas
- Shelby Stehlin as Ray Austin
- Devanny Pinn as Courtney Austin
- Brandon Van Vliet as Tony Lockhart
- Jesse Wilson as John Moore
- Buz Wallick as Chet Cheney
- Grae Drake as Bobbi
- Brett Wagner as Sheriff Bullock
- Brian Olea as Joey the security guard

== Reception ==
Critical reviews for Truth or Dare have been mixed. Grolsch Film Works and Starburst both panned the film overall, and Starburst criticized the film's torture porn elements as being "stale and not the least bit effective". Shock Till You Drop was more positive in their review and gave the film a score of 6 out of 10, stating that it was "a solid indie debut for Cameron. The film is tight, and unrelenting once it gets going, and it does so very quickly." Tucson Weekly praised Ryan Kiser's acting, writing "I haven't seen unhinged acting like that since the glory days of Steve Railsback." The reviewer also noted that the film's gore was extreme and that several people left during some of the movie's gorier scenes.

=== Awards ===
- Best Horror Feature at the Arizona Underground Film Festival (2013, won)
- Audience Choice - Favorite Feature at the PollyGrind Underground Film Festival of Las Vegas (2013, won)
- Jury Award for Best Actor - Feature Film at the Macabre Faire Film Festival (2014, won - Ryan Kiser)
- Jury Award for Best SPFX at the Macabre Faire Film Festival (2014, won - Carrie Mercado)
- Best Thriller Film at the Myrtle Beach International Film Festival (2014, won)
- Best of Fest Award for Best Director at the Shockfest Film Festival (2014, won - Jessica Cameron)
- Best of Fest Award for Best Actor at the Shockfest Film Festival (2014, won - Ryan Kiser)
- Best of Fest Award for Best Actress at the Shockfest Film Festival (2014, won - Jessica Cameron)
- Best of Fest Award for Supporting Actress at the Shockfest Film Festival (2014, won - Devanny Pinn)
