= Philadelphia Independent Film Festival =

- Location: Philadelphia, Pennsylvania, US
- Founded: 2008
- Festival date: Every April

Philadelphia Independent Film Festival is an annual film festival which takes place in Philadelphia, Pennsylvania, United States. The festival was created in 2007 by the Media Bureau, Inc. and has been programmed by the #undergroundfilmforum #uff since its inception. The festival Director is Benjamin F. Barnett. The Philadelphia Independent Film Festival accepts global submissions.

== History ==
The first festival was held in 2008 and screened 151 films and videos. The second festival was held in 2009. The third was in 2010, and the fourth, in 2011 The fifth, in 2012, screened 122 films and videos. The sixth, in 2013, screened 91 films. The 7th, in 2014, screened 98 films and videos. The festival has consistently highlighted local and global independent films. The film festival did not screen live films in 2020 due to the COVID-19 pandemic. Instead they had online screenings.

The Philadelphia Independent Film Festival was named in the "Top 50 Festivals Worth The Entry Fee" by MovieMaker magazine.
