= New Jersey Horror Con and Film Festival =

American semi-annual horror event

- Status: Active
- Genre: Horror
- Locations: Atlantic City, New Jersey; Edison, New Jersey
- Country: United States

New Jersey Horror Con and Film Festival is a semi-annual horror film and memorabilia fan convention held in Atlantic City, New Jersey and Edison, New Jersey, United States since 2017. It focuses on guest panels, where fans can meet celebrity actors from the horror genre. It is a three-day event over the course of a weekend that features a film festival and table displays full of memorabilia and art. It runs from 5 PM Friday evening until 5 PM Sunday.

== History ==
The New Jersey Horror Con and Film Festival was started by founder Ryan Scott Weber in 2017. It started in Edison, New Jersey and moved to Atlantic City, New Jersey. The convention now splits time between the two cities.

== Venues ==
The event takes place at the Showboat Atlantic City and the NJ Expo Center in Edison, New Jersey.

== Film festival ==
Over the course of three days over 40 films screen in a special screening room on the show floor. Afterwards an awards show hosted by celebrities such as Felissa Rose and Dave Sheridan (actor) amongst others announce the winners. The film festival screens both short films and full-length feature films.

== Film festival winners ==
Year	Best Film	Director(s)
2018	Killer Kate	Elliot Field
2019	Theresa & Allison	Jeremiah Kipp
2021	Human Hibachi	Mario Cerrito
2022	Human Hibachi 2: Feast in the Forest	Mario Cerrito
2023	Soulmate	Jay Palmieri
2024	Conversion of the Atheist	Michael Ambrosino
2025	A Rough Start	Manny Serrano
2026		

== Cosplay ==
From 5 to 6 p.m. on Saturdays, there is a cosplay contest, with contestants competing for prizes in a variety of categories including Best Construction, Most Creative, Best Kid Costume (15 and under), Best Entertainer/Persona and Best in Show. Prizes range from $50 to $100.

== List of celebrity guests ==
A partial list of celebrity guests once in attendance include:

- Michael Berryman
- Nell Campbell
- Peter Criss
- Carmen Electra
- Edward Furlong
- Clint Howard
- Heather Langenkamp
- Tony Moran
- Michael Paré
- Patricia Quinn
- Christina Ricci
- Debbie Rochon
- Felissa Rose
- Ken Sagoes
- Tom Savini
- Charlie Sheen
- Tom Sizemore
- Kristy Swanson
- Alex Vincent
- Claudia Wells
- Amanda Wyss

== See also ==
- List of film festivals in New Jersey
- Television and film in New Jersey
- New Jersey Motion Picture & Television Commission
