= Rowan College at Burlington County =

Community college in New Jersey, US

- Former name: Burlington County College (1966–2015)
- Type: Public community college
- Established: 1966
- Academic affiliations: Sea-grant
- President: David I. Spang (acting)
- Location: Mount Laurel, New Jersey, U.S.
- Campus: Suburban
- Colors: Red and black
- Sporting affiliations: NJCAA Region XIX, Garden State Athletic Conference
- Mascot: Baron
- Website: rcbc.edu

Rowan College at Burlington County (RCBC) is a public community college in Burlington County, New Jersey. Main facilities are located in Mount Laurel, with other campuses in Mount Holly.

== History ==
Founded as "Burlington County College" in 1966, the college opened to 1,051 students in 1969 at Lenape High School. The Pemberton campus opened a few years later in 1971. In 1972, the college received accreditation by the New Jersey Commission on Higher Education, as well as the Middle States Association of Colleges and Schools.

Throughout the next several years, the college underwent a series of changes, including increased enrollment, the opening of new campuses, the addition of more degree programs, and several leadership changes (see below).

In 2015, Burlington County College was renamed to Rowan College at Burlington County in recognition of its historic partnership with Rowan University.

In 2016, RCBC became the first community college in New Jersey authorized to offer junior-year courses in its "3+1" option to Rowan University.

=== Leadership ===
1967	N. Dean Evans
1979	Harmon Pierce
1987	Robert Messina, Jr.
2012	David C. Hespe
2014	David I. Spang
2015	Paul Drayton
2018	Michael A. Cioce
2025	David I. Spang

== Locations ==
=== Mount Laurel Campus ===
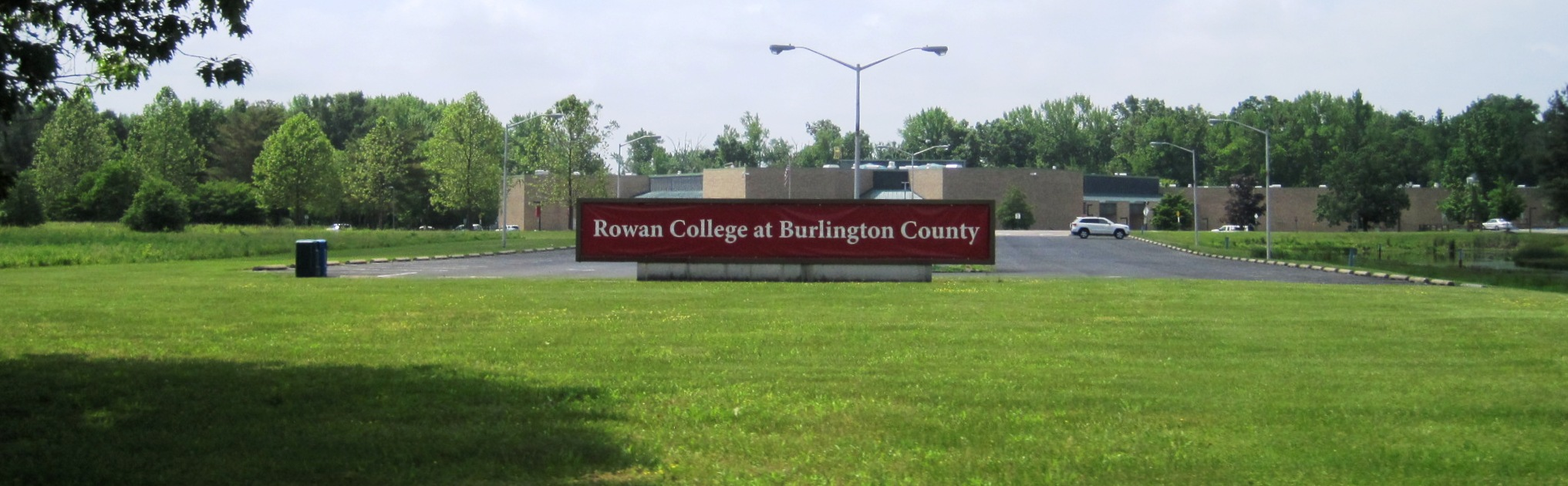
Entrance and sign

RCBC's main campus is located in the Hartford section of Mount Laurel, opened in 1995. It houses the Student Success Center and campus quad to cater to students working toward advanced degrees. A Health Sciences Center is located off of Briggs Road.

=== Mount Holly Campus ===
Located on High and Mill Street in Mount Holly, this campus houses RCBC's culinary arts program. This location also includes a student art gallery, as well as a student-run restaurant named Vaulted Cuisine. All of RCBC's art programs are located on this campus.

=== Former Pemberton Campus ===
The Pemberton Campus in Pemberton Township, New Jersey opened in 1971 as the first standalone campus of the college. It sat on a 225-acre (91 ha) site off County Route 530. Buildings included the Lewis M. Parker Center, a classroom and lab building, and the Physical Education Center, a building with a gymnasium, pool, and locker rooms. After the purchase of the county college by Rowan in 2015, classes and operations began to move to the Mount Laurel Campus. The last class was held there in 2017 and the property was available for sale the next year. The pool continued to be used by locals until 2019. The site now largely sits abandoned and vandalized.

== Athletics ==
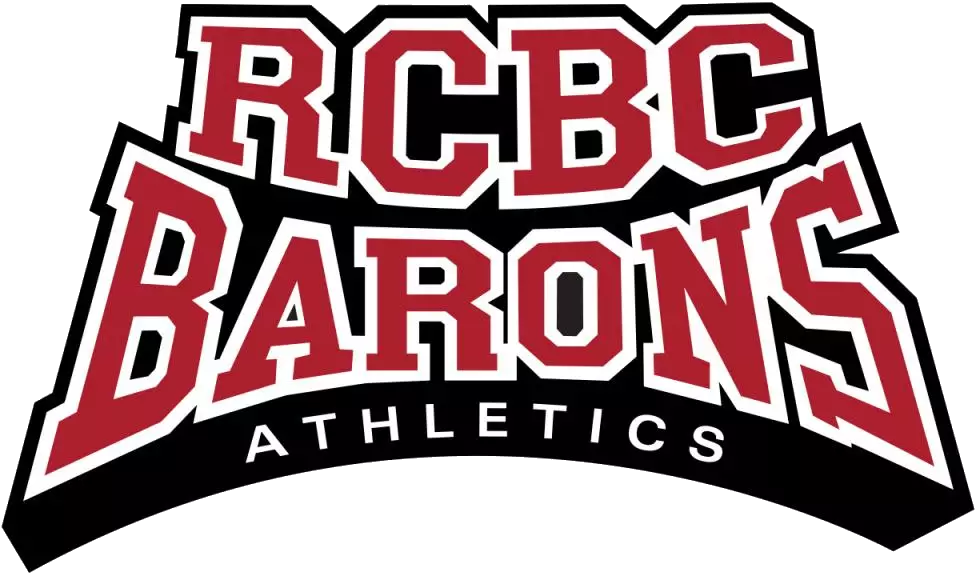
RCBC athletics logo. All programs were run out in 2021

Rowan College at Burlington County athletics teams were nicknamed the Barons. RCBC was affiliated to the Garden State Athletic Conference of National Junior College Athletic Association (NJCAA). The college discontinued its athletics programs in June 2021, as well as it erased all sports information from its website.

Sports programs fielded by the Barons were baseball, basketball (men's/women's), soccer (men's/women's), golf, and softball. At its peak, the programs combined for around 150 athletes, which made up less than 2% of the student body. The college had an annual budget for athletics of $850,000. RCBC stated that closure was decided "after a comprehensive review of costs and benefits to students, as well as the results of student survey that revealed little engagement with this program beyond the athletes."

== Notable alumni ==
- Zach Braddock (born 1987), former professional baseball player
- Mario Cerrito (born 1984), film director and producer
- Ant Clemons (born 1991), singer
- Denver Riggleman (born 1970), businessman and former politician who served one term as the United States representative for Virginia's 5th congressional district

== See also ==
- New Jersey County Colleges
