= List of horror films of 2009 =

A list of horror films released in 2009.

Horror films released in 2009
Title	Director	Cast	Country	Notes
5150 Elm's Way (5150, rue des ormes)	Éric Tessier	Normand D'Amour, Marc-André Grondin, Sonia Vachon	Canada	
Abduction	John Orrichio	Tony Rugnetta, Roberto Lombardi, Christy Callas, Deana Demko	United States	
Abundant Sunshine	Gerard Collette	Nicole Dionne, Alisha Seaton, Pat McNeely, Nick Pasqual	United States	
Agyaat	Ram Gopal Verma	Adesh Bhardwaj, Rasika Dugal, Joy Fernandes	India	
Air terjun pengantin	Rizal Mantovani	Tamara Blezinski, Marcel Chandrawinata, Tyas Miraish	Indonesia	
Albino Farm	Sean McEwen, Joe Anderson	Tammin Sursok, Sunkrish Bala, Chris Jericho	United States	
All About Evil	Joshua Grannell	Thomas Dekker, Cassandra Peterson, Mink Stole	United States	
Antichrist	Lars von Trier	Willem Dafoe, Charlotte Gainsbourg	Denmark; France; Germany; Italy; Poland; Sweden	
Are You Scared 2	John Lands, Russell Appling	Kathy Gardiner, Adrienne Hays, Chad Guerrero	United States	
Basement Jack	Michael Shelton	Eric Peter-Kaiser, Michele Morrow, Sam Skoryna	United States	
Bedtime Ghost Tales	J.R. Thomas			
Berdella	Paul South, William Taft	Vito Spino, Seth Correa, Marc Saleme, Steve Williams	United States	
Bigfoot	Bob Gray	Brooke Beckwith, Van Jackson, Shawn Kipp	United States	
Bikini Frankenstein	Nicholas Medina	Jayden Cole, Christine Nguyen, Brandin Rackley	United States	Comedy horror
Bikini Girls on Ice	Geoff Klein	Cindel Chartrand, Danielle Doetsch, Suzi Lorraine	Canada	
Birdemic: Shock and Terror	James Nguyen	Whitney Moore, Janae Caster, Colton Osborne	United States	
Black Blooded Brides of Satan	Sami Haavisto	Anne Rajala, Elina Ukkonen, Markus Salo	Finland	
Black Devil Doll	Jonathan Lewis	Heather Murphy, Natasha Talonz, Christine Svendsen	United States	
The Black Waters of Echo's Pond	Gabriel Bologna	Danielle Harris, Mircea Monroe, Adamo Palladino	United States	
Bleed with Me	Emil Ishii	Camilla Metelmann, Kim Sønderholm, Maja Muhlack	United States	
The Bleeding	Charles Picerni	Vinnie Jones, Michael Madsen, DMX	United States	
Blood Creek	Joel Schumacher	Dominic Purcell, Henry Cavill, Michael Fassbender	United States	
Blood: The Last Vampire	Chris Nahon	Masiela Lusha, Colin Salmon, Gianna Jun	France; Hong Kong	
Blood Moon Rising	Brian Skiba	Ron Jeremy, David C. Hayes, Davina Joy	United States	
A Blood Pledge	Lee Jong-yong	Son Eun-seo, Jang Kyeong-ah, Song Min-jeong, Oh Yeon-seo, Yoo Shin-ae	South Korea	
Blood Red Moon	Scott Patrick	Sarah Lavrisa, Matthew Rogers, Mark Courneyea	Canada	
Blood Ties	Nathaniel Nose	Blair Wojcik, Jason Carter, DJ Perry	United States	
Bloodbath in the House of Knives	Ted Moehring	Anne Reiss, Joseph Michael, Lloyd Kaufman, John Link	United States	
Book of Blood	John Harrison	Jonas Armstrong, Sophie Ward, Reg Fuller	United Kingdom	
Breaking Nikki	Hernán Findling	Maria Ines Alonso, Maxime Seugé, Oliver Kolker	Argentina	
Burning Bright	Carlos Brooks	Briana Evigan, Meat Loaf, Mary Rachel Dudley	United States	
The Burnt House	Adam Ahlbrandt	Lily Ahlbrandt, Joe Hiate, Monica Knight	United States	
Cabin Fever 2: Spring Fever	Ti West	Rider Strong, Michael Bowen, Noah Segan	United States	
Carriers	Alex Pastor, David Pastor	Lou Taylor Pucci, Chris Pine, Piper Perabo	United States	
Case 39	Christian Alvart	Renée Zellweger, Ian McShane, Adrian Laster	Canada	
Chaw	Shin Jung-won	Jung Yu-mi, Yoon Je-moon, Uhm Tae-woong	South Korea	Comedy adventure monster horror
Children of the Corn	Donald P. Borchers	David Anders, Kandyse McClure, Preston Bailey	United States	
The Chosen One	Theodore Collatos	Arthur Collins, Carolina Monnerat, Sam Porretta	United States	
The Collector	Marcus Dunstan	Josh Stewart, Michael Reilly Burke, Andrea Roth	United States	
Contagio	Steve Sessions	Luc Bernier, Isabelle Stephen, Tim Tanner	United States	
Coraline	Henry Selick	Dakota Fanning, Teri Hatcher, Jennifer Saunders	United States	Animated film
Creature of Darkness	Mark Stouffer	Siena Goines, Kevin Alejandro, Sanoe Lake	United States	Science fiction horror
The Crypt	Craig McMahon	Sarah Oh, Cristen Irene, Joanna Ke	United States	Direct-to-video
Dark Moon Rising	Dana Mennie	Chris DiVecchio, Sid Haig, Lin Shaye	United States	
Dark and Stormy Night	Larry Blamire	Jennifer Blaire, Daniel Roebuck, Dan Conroy	United States	Comedy horror
Dead at the Box Office	Shawn Stutler	Michael Allen Williams, Isaiah Robinson, Jennifer Popagain	United States	
Dead by Dawn 2: The Return	Nigel Hartwell	Mike Bruce, Anna Marie Cerovski, Anthony Cortese	United States	
Dead Hooker in a Trunk	Jen and Sylvia Soska	Jen Soska, Sylvia Soska, Rikki Gagne	Canada	Comedy horror
Dead Snow	Tommy Wirkola	Vegar Hoel, Stig Frode Henriksen, Charlotte Frogner, Lasse Valdal	Norway	
Deadlands 2: Trapped	Gary Ugarek	Ashley Young, Chris L. Clark, Jim Krut, Joseph D. Durbin	United States	
Deadly Little Christmas	Novin Shakiba	Felissa Rose, Monique La Barr, Leah Grimsson, Jed Rowen	United States	
The Descent 2	Jon Harris	Shauna Macdonald, Natalie Jackson Mendoza	United Kingdom	
The Devil's Tomb	Jason Connery	Cuba Gooding Jr., Ray Winstone, Ron Perlman	United States	
Diagnosis: Death	Jason Stutter	Raybon Kan, Jessica Grace Smith, Suze Tye	New Zealand	
The Disturbed	Conor McMahon	Carla McGlynn, Stephen Murray, Clyde Mowlds	Ireland	
Doghouse	Jake West	Emily Booth, Danny Dyer, Lee Ingleby	United Kingdom	
Dorian Gray	Oliver Parker	Colin Firth, Ben Barnes, Rebecca Hall, Ben Chaplin	United Kingdom	
Drag Me to Hell	Sam Raimi	Alison Lohman, Justin Long, Lorna Raver	United States	
Dread	Anthony DiBlasi	Jackson Rathbone, Shaun Evans, Paloma Faith	United Kingdom	
Drifter: Henry Lee Lucas	Michael Feifer	John Diehl Jr., Antonio Sabato, Kostas Sommer	United States	
Earth Day	Mister Ooh-la-la	Daphne Danger, Elizabeth Myers, Adrian Salge,	United States	
Edges of Darkness	Blaine Cade, Jason Horton	Alonzo F. Jones, Shamika Ann Franklin, Lee Perkins	United States	
Evil – In the Time of Heroes	Yorgos Noussias	Billy Zane, Meletis Georgiadis	Greece	
Evilution	Chris Conlee	Sandra Ramirez, Guillermo Diaz, James Duval	United States	Science fiction horror
The Familiar	Miles Hanon	Laura Spencer, Stephanie Brehms, Ben Hall	United States	
Family Demons	Ursula Dabrowsky	Cassandra Kane, Kerry Reid, Alex Rafalowicz	Australia	
The Fear Chamber	Kevin Carraway	Richard Tyson, Rhett Giles, Steven Williams	United States	
The Final	Joey Stewart	Marc Donato, Jascha Washington, Whitney Hoy	United States	
The Final Destination	David R. Ellis	Bobby Campo, Shantel VanSanten, Haley Webb	United States	
First 7th Night	Herman Yau Lai-To	Michelle Ye, Gordon Lam Ka-Tung, Tony Ho Wah-Chiu	Hong Kong	
Flesh, TX	Guy Crawford	Joe Estevez, Kathleen Benner, Jose Rosete	United States	
The Fourth Kind	Olatunde Osunsanmi	Milla Jovovich, Elias Koteas, Will Patton	United States	Science fiction horror
Freeway Killer	John Murlowski	Michael Rooker, Eileen Dietz, Tyler Neitzel	United States	
Friday the 13th	Marcus Nispel	Derek Mears, Jared Padalecki, Amanda Righetti	United States	
George's Intervention	J.T. Seaton		United States	
Gnaw	Gregory Mandry	Julia Vandoorne, Rachel Mitchem, Gary Faulkner	United Kingdom	
Grace	Paul Solet	Jordan Ladd, Stephen Park, Samantha Ferris	United States	
Grave Danger	Jim Haggerty	Cathy St. George, Vic Martino, Jonathan Holtzman	United States	
Gravestoned	Michael McWillie	Eryn Brooke, Lar Park-Lincoln, Hope Latimer	United States	
Grotesque	Koji Shiraishi	Hiroaki Kawatsure, Tsugumi Nagasawa, Shigeo Ōsako	Japan	
Growth	Gabriel Cowan	Brian Krause, Mircea Monroe, Richard Riehle	United States	
The Grudge 3	Toby Wilkins	Johanna Braddy	United States	
Halloween II	Rob Zombie	Tyler Mane, Scout Taylor-Compton, Malcolm McDowell	United States	
Hanger	Ryan Nicholson	Nathan Dashwood, Wade Gibb, Alastair Gamble	Canada	
The Haunting	Elio Quiroga	Ana Torrent, Héctor Colomé, Julio Perillán	Spain	
The Haunting in Connecticut	Peter Cornwell	Amanda Crew, Virginia Madsen, Kyle Gallner	United States	
Haunting of Winchester House	Mark Atkins	Lira Kellerman, Patty Roberts, Tomas Boykin	United States	
He	Creep Creepersin	Ariauna Albright, Matt Turek, Marlina Germanova	United States	Direct-to-video
Heartless	Philip Ridley	Joseph Mawle, Jim Sturgess, Clémence Poésy	United Kingdom	
Hellhounds	Rick Schroder	Amanda Brooks, Andrew Howard, Scott Elrod	United States	
Hellphone	Joven Tan	Rainier Castillo, Dexter Doria, Basty Alcances	Philippines	
Hidden	Pål Øie	Anders Danielsen Lie, Karin Park, Marko Iversen Kanic	Norway	
Higanjima	Kim Tae-kyun	Dai Watanabe, Koji Yamamoto, Miori Takimoto	Japan; South Korea	
The Hills Run Red	Dave Parker	Sophie Monk, Tad Hilgenbrink, Janet Montgomery, Alex Wyndham, William Sadler,	United States	
La horde	Yannick Dahan, Benjamin Rocher	Eriq Ebouaney, Aurélien Recoing, Alain Figlarz	France	
Horrid	James Pronath	Melissa Jo Murphy, Charles Ramsey, Donn Kennedy	United States	
Hotel Darklight	Alan Brennan, Ciaran Foy, Conor McMahon, Brian O'Toole, Ewan Petit, James Phelan, Kian Pitit, Dolores Rice, Paul Walker, Ian Walker	Susan Loughnane, Carla Mooney, Noel Aungier, Aisling Bodkin	Ireland	
The House of the Devil	Ti West	A. J. Bowen, Tom Noonan, Mary Woronov	United States	
House of the Wolf Man	Eben McGarr	Ron Chaney, Dustin Fitzsimons, Jeremie Loncka	United States	
Humains	Jacques-Olivier Melon	Philippe Nahon, Sara Forestier, Dominique Pinon	France	
The Human Centipede (First Sequence)	Tom Six	Akihiro Kitamura, Dieter Laser, Andreas Leupold, Ashley C. Williams	United Kingdom; Netherlands	
Humanimal	Francesc Morales	Cristobal Tapia-Montt, Francisco Gormaz, Felipe Avello, Cecilia Levi, Jimena Nuñez	Chile	
Hunger	Steven Hentges	Lori Heuring, Lea Kohl, Linden Ashby	United States	
Hurt	Barbara Stepansky	Jackson Rathbone, Melora Walters, William Mapother	United States	
Hush	Mark Tonderai	William Ash, Christine Bottomley, Andreas Wisniewski	United Kingdom	
Hydra	Andrew Prendergast	Polly Shannon, William Gregory Lee, Texas Battle	United States	
It's Alive	Josef Rusnak	Bijou Phillips, Raphaël Coleman, James Murray	United States	Remake
In a Spiral State	Ramzi Abed	Gidget Gein, Bianca Barnett, Elissa Dowling	United States	
Incest Death Squad	Cory Udler	Elske McCain, Lloyd Kaufman, Scarlet Salem	United States	
Infestation	Kyle Rankin	Diane Gaeta, Kinsey Packard, Brooke Nevin	United States	
Interplanetary	Chance Shirley	Melissa Bush, Chuck Hartsell, Kyle Holman	United States	
Intruder	Gregory Caiafa	Brian Ish, Alexandra Grossi, Arda Itez	United States	
Invitation Only	Kevin Ko	Kristian Brodie, Maria Ozawa, Jerry Huang	Taiwan	
Jennifer's Body	Karyn Kusama	Megan Fox, Amanda Seyfried, Johnny Simmons	United States	Comedy Horror
Laid to Rest	Robert Hall	Bobbi Sue Luther, Lena Headey, Kevin Gage	France	
The Landlord	Emil Hyde		United States	
The Last House on the Left	Dennis Iliadis	Sara Paxton, Martha MacIsaac	United States	
The Last Lovecraft: The Relic of Cthulhu	Henry Saine	Barak Hardley, Edmund Lupinski, Sujata Day	United States	
Late Fee	Carl Morano, John Carchietta	Stephanie Danielson, Georgia Kate Haege, Sawyer Novak	Germany	
Lesbian Vampire Killers	Phil Claydon	Vera Filatova, Silvia Colloca, Lucy Gaskell	United Kingdom	Comedy horror
Life Blood	Ron Carlson	Scout Taylor-Compton, Danny Woodburn, Jennifer Tung	United States	
Live Evil	Jay Woelfel	Ken Foree, Åsa Wallander, Mark Hengst	United States	
Love Blade	Jason Rudy	Tiffany Arscott, Rae Wright	United States	
The Loved Ones	Sean Byrne	Xavier Samuel, Jessica MacNamee, John Brumpton	Australia	
Macabre	Timo Tjahjanto & Kimo Stamboel		Indonesia	
Machined Reborn	Craig McMahon	Russell Clay, Dave Kahrl, Chris Cox	United States	
Malibu Shark Attack	David Lister	Peta Wilson, Mungo McKay, Sonya Salomaa	Australia	
Maneater	Michael Emanuel	Robert R. Shafer, Dean Cain, Conrad Janis	United States	
Meadowoods	Scott Phillips		United States	
Mega Shark vs. Giant Octopus	Jack Perez	Lorenzo Lamas, Deborah Gibson, Vic Chao	United States	
Melancholie der Engel	Marian Dora	Bianca Schneider, Martina Adora, Ulli Lommel	Germany	
Mental Scars	Mischa Perez	John Gearries, Sonny Landham, Theresa Alexandria	United States	
Messengers 2: The Scarecrow	Martin Barnewitz	Norman Reedus, Heather Stephens, Claire Holt, Michael McCoy, Erbi Ago, Richard Riehle, Matthew McNulty,	United States	
Methodic	Chris R. Notarile	Brandon Slagle, Niki Notarile, Tony Dadika, Roberto Lombardi	United States	
Midnight Movie	Jack Messitt	Rebekah Brandes, Mandell Maughan, Stan Ellsworth	United States	Direct-to-video
Murder Collection V.1	Fred Vogel		United States	
The Murder Farm	Bettina Oberli	Julia Jentsch, Monica Bleibtreu, Vitus Zeplichal	Germany	
Must Love Death	Andreas Schaap	Sami Loris, Manon Kahle, Lucie Pohl	Germany	
Mutants	David Morlet	Dida Diafat, Hélène de Fougerolles, Nicolas Briançon	France	
Mutilation Mile	Ron Atkins	Lawrence Bucher, Susan Bull, Toni Ferrari	United States	
My Bloody Valentine 3D	Patrick Lussier	Jensen Ackles, Jaime King, Tom Atkins, Kerr Smith	United States	
My Super Psycho Sweet 16	Jacob Gentry	Chris Zylka, Julianna Guill, Lauren McKnight	United States	
My Wife Is a Vampire	Paul Marrin	Teyama Alkamli, Morgan Jarvis, James Emmerson	Canada	
Necromentia	Pearry Reginald Teo	Chad Grimes, Layton Matthews, Santiago Craig	United States	
Necrosis	Jason Robert Stephens	Penny Drake, George Stults, Robert Michael Ryan	United States	
Neighbor	Robert Angelo Masciantonio	America Olivo, Joe Aniska, Amy Rutledge	United States	
Neowolf	Yvan Gauthier	Veronica Cartwright, Agim Kaba, Heidi Johanningmeier	United States	
Never on Sunday	Francis Xavier	Elissa Dowling, Mari Cielo Pajares, Joe Ochman	United States	
Nine Dead	Chris Shadley	Melissa Joan Hart, William Lee Scott, Lucille Soong	United States	
Nine Miles Down	Anthony Waller	Kate Nauta, Meredith Ostrom, Adrian Paul	United States	
Nun of That	Richard Griffin	Sarah Nicklin, Alexandra Cipolla, Debbie Rochon	United States	
Occult	Kōji Shiraishi	Mika Azuma, Horiken, Kōen Kondō	Japan	Lovecraftian-derived
Open Graves	Álvaro de Armiñán	Mike Vogel, Eliza Dushku, Iman Nazemzadeh	Spain; United States	
Oral Fixation	Jake Cashill	Emily Parker, Kerry Aissa, Chris Kies	United States	
Orphan	Jaume Collet-Serra	Vera Farmiga, Peter Sarsgaard	Germany; Canada; United States	
Pandorum	Christian Alvart	Dennis Quaid, Antje Traue, Wotan Wilke Möhring	United States	
Paranormal Entity	Shane Van Dyke	Fia Perera, Norman Saleet, Erin Marie Hogan	United States	Mockbuster
Patient X	Yam Laranas	Richard Gutierrez, Cristine Reyes, TJ Trinidad	Philippines	
Penance	Jake Kennedy	Marieh Delfino, Tony Todd, Michael Rooker	United States	
Perkins' 14	Craig Singer	Roxanna Ravenor, Michale Graves, Katherine Pawlak	United States	
The Pit and the Pendulum	David DeCoteau	Amy Paffrath, Lorielle New, Tom Sandoval	United States	
Poker Run	Julian Higgins		United States	
Postman does not knock three times	Hassan Fathi	Ali Nasirian, Pantea Bahram, Baran Kosari, Mohammad-Reza Foroutan	Iran	
Quiet Nights of Blood and Pain	Andrew Copp	Ray Freeland, Loren S. Goins, Adrienne DeLotelle	United States	Direct-to-video
Ravage the Scream Queen	Bill Zebub	Nikki Sebastian, Jordana Leigh, Elyse Cheri	United States	
The Reeds	Nick Cohen	Anna Brewster, Scarlett Alice Johnson, Will Mellor	United Kingdom	
Rise of the Gargoyles	Bill Corcoran	Eric Balfour, Tanya Clarke, Ifan Huw Dafydd	Canada	
Rotkappchen: The Blood of Red Riding Hood	Harry Sparks	Stefanie Geils, Chris O'Brocki, Angelina Leigh	United States	
Run! Bitch Run!	Joseph Guzman	Cheryl Lyone, Peter Tahoe, Christina DeRosa	United States	
The Sacred	Jose Zambrano Cassella		United States	
Sand Serpents	Jeff Renfroe	Jason Gedrick, Elias Toufexis, Sebastian Knapp	United States	Television film
Satanic Panic	Marc Selz	Victoria Vukovic Bradley, Melissa Chirello-Wood, Rosa Isela Frausto	United States	
Saw VI	Kevin Greutert	Tobin Bell, Shawnee Smith, Costas Mandylor, Betsy Russell, Tanedra Howard	United States	
Scare Zone	Jon Binkowski	Cynthia Murell, Michele Feren, Laura Alexandra Ramos	United States	
Sea of Dust	Scott Bunt	Ingrid Pitt, Stuart Rudin, Tom Savini	United States	
Shadow	Federico Zampaglione	Jake Muxworthy, Chris Coppola, Karina Testa	Italy	
Shake, Rattle & Roll XI	Jessell Monteverde, Rico Gutierrez, Don Michael Perez	Ruffa Gutierrez, Maja Salvador, Iya Villania	Philippines	
Shattered Lives	Carl Lindbergh	Lindsey Leino, Skyler Caleb, Ellyse Deanna	United States	
She's Crushed	Patrick Johnson	Henrick Nolen, Caitlin Wehrle, Natalie Dickinson	United States	
Shiver	Isidro Ortiz		United States	
The Shock Labyrinth 3D	Takashi Shimizu	Yūya Yagira, Misako Renbutsu, Ryo Katsuji	Japan	
The Shortcut	Nicholaus Goossen	Shannon Woodward, Katrina Bowden, Wendy Anderson	United States	
The Shrine	Jon Knautz	Aaron Ashmore, Trevor Matthews, Cindy Sampson	United States	
Silent Night, Zombie Night	Sean Cain	Vernon Wells, Lew Temple, Felissa Rose	United States	
Skull Heads	Charles Band	Robin Sydney, Steve Kramer	United States	
Slaughtered	Kate Glover	Steven O'Donnell, James Kerley, Cassandra Swaby	Australia	
Smash Cut	Lee Demarbre	David Hess, Sasha Grey, Jesse Buck	United States	
Someone's Knocking at the Door	Chad Ferrin	Noel Segan, Ezra Buzzington, Elina Madison	United States	
Sorority Row	Stewart Hendler	Rumer Willis, Audrina Patridge, Leah Pipes, Margo Harshman	United States	Remake
Spirit Camp	Kerry Beyer	Marco Perella, Denise Williamson, Amy Morris	United States	
Splice	Vincenzo Natali	Sarah Polley, Adrien Brody, David Hewlett	France; Canada	
Staunton Hill	Cameron Romero	Kathy Lamkin, Cristen Coppen, David Rountree	United States	Direct-to-video
Strigoi	Faye Jackson	Cătălin Paraschiv, Constantin Bărbulescu, Adrian Done	United Kingdom	Comedy horror
Suck	Rob Stefaniuk	Alice Cooper, Jessica Paré, Iggy Pop	United States	
Summer's Moon	Lee Demarbre	Ashley Greene, Stephen McHattie, Peter Mooney, Barbara Niven	Canada	Direct-to-video
Survival of the Dead	George A. Romero	Alan Van Sprang, Kenneth Welsh, Kathleen Munroe	Canada; United States	
Surviving Evil	Terence Daw	Billy Zane, Alexis Georgiou, Louise Bamber	Russia; United Kingdom	
Sutures	Tammi Sutton	Carlos Lauchu, Azie Tesfai, Allison Lange	United States	
Sweatshop	Stacy Davidson	Danielle Jones, Melanie Donihoo, Naika Malveaux	United States	
Taintlight	Chris Seaver	Jesse Ames, Andrew Baltes, Miranda Bonetwig	United States	
Tell-Tale	Michael Cuesta	Ulrich Thomsen, Josh Lucas, Dallas Roberts	United States; United Kingdom	
The Telling	Nicholas Carpenter	Bridget Marquardt, Holly Madison, Sara Jean Underwood	United States	
Terror Overload – Tales from Satan's Truck Stop		Scarlet Salem, Joe Knetter	United States	
The Thaw	Mark A. Lewis	Val Kilmer, Martha McIsaac, Aaron Ashmore, Kyle Schmid	Canada	
Thirst	Park Chan-wook	Song Kang-ho, Kim Ok-vin	South Korea	
Thirsty	Andrew Kasch	Tiffany Shepis	United States	
Tony	Gerard Johnson	Peter Ferdinando, Ricky Grover, George Russo	United Kingdom	
Tormented	Jon Wright	Calvin Dean, Tuppence Middleton, Dimitri Leonidas	United Kingdom	
The Tortured	Robert Lieberman	Jesse Metcalfe, Erika Christensen	United States	
Transylmania	David Hillenbrand & Scott Hillenbrand	Patrick Cavanaugh, James DeBello, Paul H. Kim, Tony Denman, Jennifer Lyons	United States	
Triangle	Christopher Smith	Melissa George, Liam Hemsworth, Holly Marie Combs	United Kingdom	
Twilight Vamps	Fred Olen Ray	Jayden Cole, Christine Nguyen, Brandin Rackley	United States	
The Uh! Oh! Show	Herschell Gordon Lewis	Brooke McCarter, Bruce Blauer, Krista Grotte	United States	
The Unborn	David S. Goyer	Odette Yustman, Meagan Good	United States	
Uncharted	Frank Nunez	Demetrius Navarro, Shana Montanez, Erlinda Orozco	United States	
Underworld: Rise of the Lycans	Patrick Tatopoulos	Michael Sheen, Bill Nighy, Rhona Mitra	United States	
The Undying	Steven Peros	Robin Weigert, Anthony Carrigan	United States	
The Uninvited	Charles Guard	Elizabeth Banks, Arielle Kebbel, Emily Browning	United States	Remake
Vacancy 2: The First Cut	Eric Bross	Agnes Bruckner, Arjay Smith, Beau Billingslea	United States	
Vampire Girl vs. Frankenstein Girl	Naoyuki Tomomatsu, Yoshihiro Nishimura	Cay Izumi, Takumi Saito, Yukie Kawamura	Japan	
Vampiro	Jorge Ramirez Rivera	Damian Chapa, Leslie Garza, Vida Harlow	Mexico	
Vertige	Abel Ferry	Fanny Valette, Johan Libéreau, Maud Wyler	France	
The Wake Wood	David Keating	Aidan Gillen, Eva Birthistle, Timothy Spall	Ireland	
Witchmaster General	Jim Haggerty	Tatyana Kot, Bud Stafford, Suzi Lorraine	United States	
Wolvesbayne	Griff Furst	Jeremy London, Christy Carlson Romano	United States	Direct-to-video
Won Ton Baby!	James Morgart	Suzi Lorraine, Gunnar Hansen, Debbie Rochon	United States	
Wrong Turn 3: Left for Dead	Declan O'Brien	Chucky Venice, Tamer Hassan, Janet Montgomery	United States	
Zombieland	Ruben Fleischer	Woody Harrelson, Jesse Eisenberg, Emma Stone, Abigail Breslin	United States	Comedy horror
Zombies & Cigarettes	Rafael Martinez, Iñaki San Román	Aroa Gimeno, Mónica Miranda, María San Miguel	Spain	
Zone of the Dead	Milan Konjević, Milan Todorović		Serbia; Italy; Spain	
