= Tommy Pistol =

American pornographic actor (born 1976)

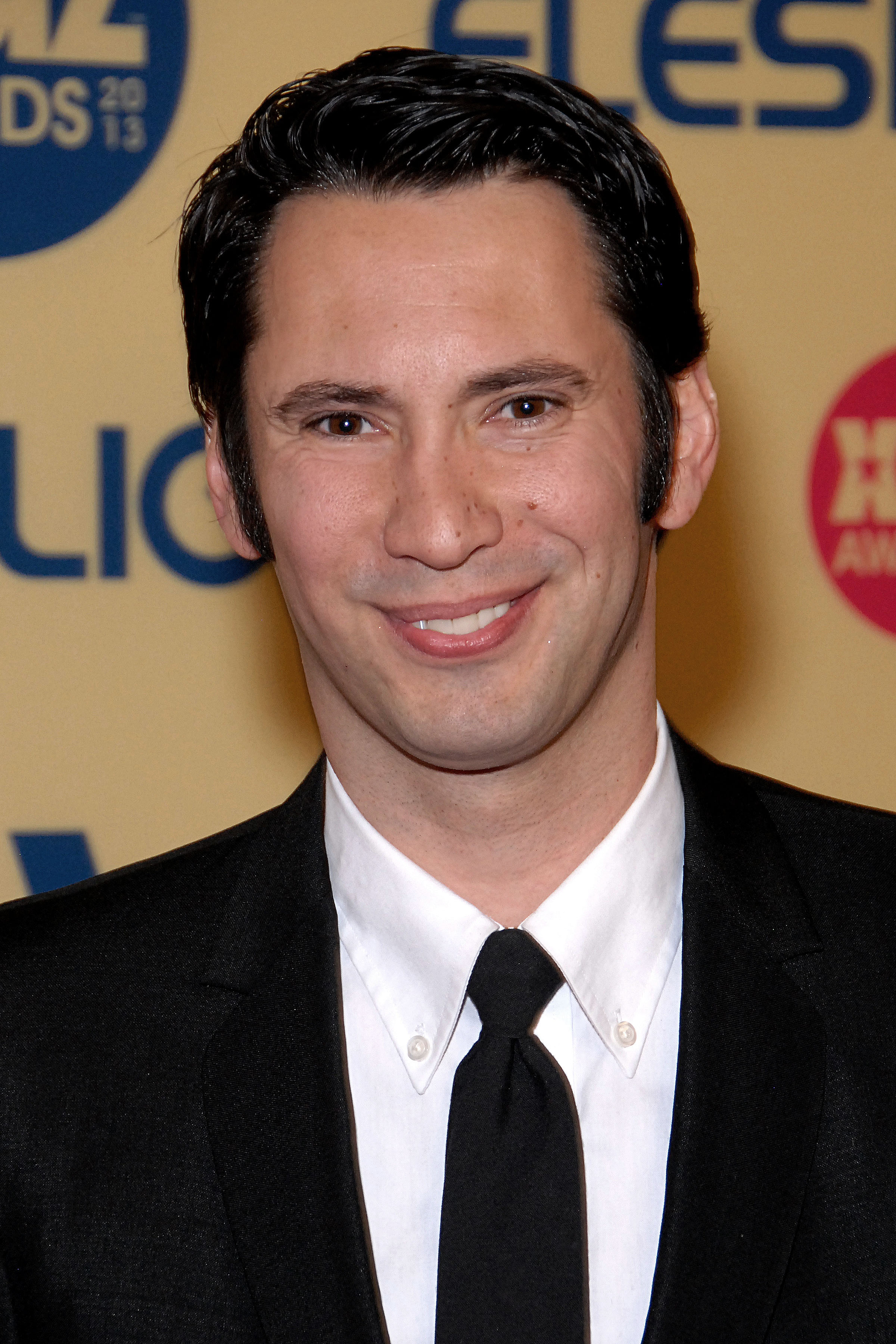
- Tommy Pistol at the XBIZ Awards in Century City, California on January 11, 2013
- Born: Aramis Sartorio; July 2, 1976 (age 49); Queens, New York, U.S.
- Other name: DJ Tommy Pistol
- Height: 5 ft 7 in (1.70 m)
- Spouse: Gia Paloma (m. 2007; div. 2013)

Aramis Sartorio (born July 2, 1976), better known by his stage name Tommy Pistol, is an American pornographic actor and director. He is known for his porn parody work, most notably as the lead actor in Evil Head, Pee-Wee's XXX Adventure: A Porn Parody, Taxi Driver: A XXX Parody, and Suicide Squad: An Axel Braun Parody.

== Career ==
Tommy Pistol started his career in Queens, New York, as a stage actor with sketch comedy group Cheese Theater, with whom he acted for more than a decade. He also appeared in several short and feature films. Pistol was also once a singer for the metalcore band AmoreA. He also played bass and rapped in the NYC Punk band Flemm.

He entered the pornography business in late 2005, after meeting with Joanna Angel, founder of the alt-porn company Burning Angel; this led to Pistol becoming the first male performer on BurningAngel.com. Angel was also responsible for choosing the moniker Tommy Pistol, after nixing A-Mac, Pistol's original name idea. Within a year of being hired by Burning Angel, he had begun to branch out to other studios, including Bang Bros, Facial Abuse and Latina Abuse, VCA, and Vivid.

Credited under his given name, Pistol wrote, directed, and portrayed the title role in the 2010 independent horror-comedy film The Gruesome Death of Tommy Pistol; he also performed as DJ Tommy Pistol on the film's soundtrack. Pistol continued to direct, and in 2013, he directed the feature horror-porn Beyond Fucked: A Zombie Odyssey. In 2014, Pistol won AVN's Best Actor Award for his role as Ash Williams in Burning Angel's Evil Head, the porn parody of the Evil Dead franchise. Pistol went on to star as The Joker in Axel Braun's Suicide Squad: An Axel Braun Parody, and other lead roles, including his 2018 AVN Best Actor Win for Ingenue.

In 2015, Pistol became the first male performer in twenty years to host the annual AVN Awards in Las Vegas, Nevada, alongside Alexis Texas.

Pistol has made several appearances under his given name in independent films, including Bethany, Jurassic City, and the lead role in Frankie in Blunderland. Since 2016, he has participated in the annual WIH Massive Blood Drive PSA, a collaboration between the international grassroots initiative Women in Horror Month and Twisted Twin Productions.

Pistol enjoyed mainstream recognition when his minor role as "The Cook" in Brazzers' Tatas Under Siege: An XXX Parody went viral on Twitter. Pistol has also been featured on BuzzFeed, Uproxx, and most recently, Elle.com, after a tweet mocking Donald Trump was liked by Trump's daughter, Ivanka.

In September 2022, Canadian horror directors the Soska Sisters announced the premiere of their new film On the Edge, co-starring Pistol, to take place at the London FrightFest Halloween festival on October 29. The film was shot and produced in Canada and also co-stars Jen Soska, Sylvia Soska and Mackenzie Gray.

== Personal life ==
Pistol was born in Queens, New York.

== Awards ==
- 2006 AVN Award – Most Outrageous Sex Scene (Re-Penetrator) with Joanna Angel
- 2007 AVN Award – Best New Male Performer
- 2012 XBIZ Award – Male Acting Performance of the Year-Male (Taxi Driver XXX)
- 2014 XBIZ Award – Best Supporting Actor (The Temptation of Eve)
- 2014 AVN Award – Best Actor (Evil Head)
- 2015 XBIZ Award – Best Actor – Parody Release (Not the Jersey Boys XXX)
- 2015 XBIZ Award – Best Scene – Parody Release (American Hustle XXX) with Aaliyah Love
- 2016 XBIZ Award – Best Actor – Couples-Themed Release (Wild Inside)
- 2017 XBIZ Award – Best Actor – Parody Release (Suicide Squad XXX: An Axel Braun Parody)
- 2019 XBIZ Award – Best Actor – Feature Movie (Anne: A Taboo Parody (PureTaboo/Gamma Films))
- 2019 XBIZ Award – Best Actor – Couples-Themed Release (The Weight of Infidelity (PureTaboo/Gamma Films))
- 2020 AVN Award – Best Supporting Actor – The Gang Makes a Porno: A DP XXX Parody
- 2022 AVN Award – Male Performer of the Year
- 2022 AVN Award – Best Leading Actor
- 2022 AVN Award – Best Supporting Actor

== Partial filmography ==
- Webdreams (2008)
- Silent Night, Zombie Night (2009) - Baseball Bat Fu Zombie
- The Gruesome Death of Tommy Pistol (2010) - Tommy Pistol
- Breath of Hate (2011) - Mike
- Frankie in Blunderland (2011) - Frankie Bellini
- Taxi Driver: A XXX Parody (2011) – Travis Bickle
- A Wet Dream on Elm Street (2011) – Professor
- Evil Head (2012) - Ashley J. Williams
- Pee-Wee's XXX Adventure: A Porn Parody (2012) - Pee-Wee
- Tatas Under Siege: An XXX Parody (2012) – The Cook
- SpongeKnob SquareNuts (2013) – Patrick Star
- Jurassic City (2015) - Prison Gate Guard
- Suicide Squad XXX: An Axel Braun Parody (2016) - The Joker
- Another Yeti A Love Story: Life on the Streets (2017) - Ronaldo
- Bethany (2017) – Carl Penicule
- Ingénue (2017) - Dave Henderson
- Diminuendo (2018) - Grayson
- Shakespeare's Shitstorm (2020) - Orgy Person
- Pleasure (2021) - Mike
- On the Edge (2022) - Peter
