= Breath of Hate =

- Directed by: Sean Cain
- Written by: Wes Laurie
- Produced by: Sean Cain; Wes Laurie
- Starring: Jason Mewes; Ezra Buzzington; Monique Parent; Felissa Rose; Joanna Angel
- Music by: Mario Salvucci
- Distributed by: Wild Eye Releasing
- Release date: June 10, 2011 (Another Hole in the Head Genre Film Festival)
- Country: United States
- Language: English

Breath of Hate is a 2011 horror film later re-released in 2015 under the title The Last House by Wild Eye Releasing. Starring Jason Mewes, Ezra Buzzington, and Monique Parent, it is the second collaboration between Velvet Hammer Films and ArsonCuff Entertainment who previously teamed up on Silent Night, Zombie Night.

== Plot ==
Love is a prostitute looking to get out of the business, but unfortunately her last gig is for three psychotic cultists who've just escaped from a mental hospital and are trawling for victims.

== Cast ==
- Ezra Buzzington as Hate
- Jason Mewes as Ned
- Lauren Walsh as Love
- Jack Forcinito as Sonny
- Monique Parent as Selma
- Timothy Muskatell as Poot
- Ricardo Gray as Cleb
- Felissa Rose as Realtor
- Alexis Zibolis as Jenna
- Jeanine Daniels as Hailey
- Trista Robinson as Tabbi
- Ted Prior as Danton
- Aramis Sartorio as Mike
- Joanna Angel as Candy
- Regan Reece as Lead Dancer

== Production ==
Production began in August 2010 for fourteen days at a Malibu, California mansion that has been used in many other productions, mostly notably David DeCoteau's 1313 film series and sex comedies from The Asylum.

== Release ==
Breath of Hate had a sneak preview at the Gorezone magazine Weekend of Horrors on October 2, 2010, in London, where it played to a packed house. The film had its official world premiere as part of 2011's Another Hole in the Head film festival in San Francisco, and as part of the Fangoria film festival in Indiana.

In January 2011, Sean Cain, the film's director, stated his goal was to secure a limited theatrical run for the film. After nearly two years of talks with distributors, he started a Kickstarter campaign to obtain funds for a January 2013 four wall theatrical debut and DVD/Blu-ray release. The $15,000 fundraiser raised $5,033 after one month, and the project subsequently failed to get funded. The film was picked up for a Los Angeles premiere in March by the CineMayhem film festival in conjunction with Dread Central, as part of their 2013 Indie Horror month, where it played alongside another Jason Mewes film, K-11, and the world premiere of The ABCs of Death.

On November 24, 2015, the film, now retitled The Last House, was released digitally and on DVD through the boutique indie distributor, Wild Eye Releasing. In April 2018, it was pulled from Amazon Prime due to offensive content.
