= My Name Is 'A' by Anonymous =

- Poster
- Directed by: Shane Ryan
- Written by: Shane Ryan
- Produced by: Kevin Gage; Ryan Nicholson
- Starring: Katie Marsh; Demi Baumann; Teona Dolnikova
- Cinematography: Arturo Guerrero
- Edited by: Shane Ryan
- Music by: Ginnetta Correli; Teona Dolnikova; Casey Fera; Jasmine Jamison; Andrew Shewell
- Production company: Mad Sin Cinema
- Distributed by: Modern American Cinema; Wild Eye Releasing
- Release date: October 19, 2012 (PollyGrind)
- Running time: 90 minutes
- Country: United States
- Languages: French; Russian; Polish; English
- Budget: $300

My Name Is 'A' by Anonymous, also known by the alternate release titles of My Name Is 'A', Alyssa: Portrait of a Teen Killer, or simply Portrait of a Teen Killer, is a 2012 microbudget thriller film written and directed by Shane Ryan, and executive produced by Billionaire B and Ewan Bourne. The film is loosely based on a 2009 murder by then 15-year-old Alyssa Bustamante, who killed her 9-year-old neighbor Elizabeth Olten.

It premiered at the PollyGrind Film Festival on October 19, 2012, where it received an award for "Best Art House Film".

== Synopsis ==
Alyssa (Katie Marsh) is a troubled young teen who spends her days hanging out with her friend The Sidekick (Demi Baumann) and practicing self-harm. They also bully her younger brother Joseph (Joseph Marsh) and each other while making angry videotape messages. The film also follows a seemingly unrelated teen, The Performer (Teona Dolnikova), who not only practices self-harm but she is also bulimic and hints that her father (Sean Cain) may be sexually abusing her. A third, also seemingly unrelated teen is The Angst (Alex Damiano). Like The Performer, The Angst also engages in self-harm and bulimia, but unlike The Performer, the viewer is shown that her father is indeed sexually molesting her. Although initially separate with the exception of Alyssa and The Sidekick, the seemingly separate threads come together with the murder of Elizabeth (Kaliya Skye), Alyssa's young neighbor.

== Cast ==
- Katie Marsh as Alyssa
- Demi Baumann as The Sidekick
- Teona Dolnikova as The Performer
- Alex Damiano as The Angst
- Kaliya Skye as Elizabeth
- Joseph Marsh as Joseph
- Sean Cain as The Performer's Father
- Domiziano Arcangeli as The Angst's Father

== Production and release ==
Ryan was initially inspired to create the film after viewing news articles and commentary about Bustamante, particularly a segment by Nancy Grace where she "[making] fun of a 15-year-old child, regardless of what she did. And [Grace didn't] even know if she did it yet". Filming took place over a four-day period on a budget of $300, and the work initially held the working titles of Columbine and The Columbine Effect. Prior to releasing the film, Ryan considered releasing the work anonymously due to negative initial critic reviews. At this point the film's title had changed to "My Name Is 'A'" and Ryan added the words "by Anonymous" to the title to reflect on what was supposed to be the anonymity of the director. He later decided against releasing the film anonymously, but chose to leave "by Anonymous" in the title to reflect on the anonymity of several of the characters in the film.

Theatrical and VOD film rights to My Name Is 'A' by Anonymous were purchased shortly after its 2012 film festival debut at Pollygrid and the film was intended to receive a wider release in November of the same year, but the movie did not receive an official release until November 2014, when Wild Eye Releasing picked up the VOD (under the title Alyssa: Portrait of a Teen Killer) and DVD rights. Ryan held a successful IndieGoGo campaign in September 2014 to fund a screening of the movie in Los Angeles.

== Reception ==
Critical reception for My Name Is 'A' by Anonymous has been mostly positive, with many critics noting that viewer reception for the film would be polarized due to its subject matter. Film Threat and Nerdly both gave the film mostly positive reviews, with Film Threat noting that it was "a rough film to sit through, but I’d be concerned about my own psyche if I thought there was a way to experience the subject matter and not be disturbed. A combination of outside narrative and found footage first person, Shane Ryan (credited as Bonéshin) manages to create a cinematic experience that is as arty as it is unsettling." Flickering Myth highlighted the usage of Teona Dolnikova's music, which they found "ominous and atmospheric right off the bat".
