= Humanimal =

Humanimal may refer to:

- Humanimal (band), a hard rock band
- Humanimal (film), a horror movie by Francesc Morales
- Humanimal (album), an album by Talisman
- Humanimals, an album by Grand Ole Party
- Human–animal hybrid
