= Shark Exorcist =

- Directed by: Donald Farmer
- Written by: Donald Farmer
- Starring: Angela Kerecz; Bobby Kerecz; Channing Dodson; Madison Carney
- Distributed by: Wild Eye Releasing
- Release date: 2016
- Running time: 88 minutes
- Country: United States
- Language: English

Shark Exorcist is a 2016 horror film written and directed by Donald Farmer and distributed by Wild Eye Releasing.

== Plot ==
A Devil-worshiping nun summons a demon to inhabit the body of a great white shark that terrorizes a small coastal village. A priest takes it upon himself to save the day.

== Critical reception ==
Gizmodo: "Seriously, I couldn’t be more excited for this flick. It’s completely incoherent and fucked up in a glorious, Russ Meyer kind of way. And we haven’t even gotten to the sharks or the exorcism yet! I really hope that there’s a possessed shark. Or that our hero gets possessed by a shark!"

Collider: "If projects like Shark Exorcist, Sharktopus and Sharkansas Women's Prison Massacre qualified as credible filmmaking attempts, they would dominate this entire list. But, for the most part, the low-effort schlock that chums the 'sharksploitation' waters, doesn't come close".

MovieWeb: "Nothing will ever be able to prepare us for the horrors of the Shark Exorcist!", "Sure to become a cult hit".
