= Sexina =

- Directed by: Erik Sharkey
- Written by: Erik Sharkey
- Produced by: Lauren D'Avella; Adam West; Annie Golden; Cash Tilton
- Distributed by: Wild Eye Releasing
- Release date: 2007
- Country: United States
- Language: English

Sexina (also known as Popstar Private Eye and Sexina: Popstar P.I.) is a 2007 American comedy film starring Lauren D'Avella and Adam West.

The film is written and directed by Erik Sharkey in his directorial debut and features a theme song by The Monkees band member Davy Jones. The film is distributed by Wild Eye Releasing.

The film was screened at the 2007 Fort Lauderdale International Film Festival. A DVD release happened in 2014, and upon this release the theatrical release title was shortened from Sexina: Popstar P.I. to simply Sexina.

== Plot ==
Blonde beautiful pop star Sexina is also a crime fighting private eye who discovers that a former rock star turned scientist has engineered a robot boy band at the behest of the evil bossman of Glitz records.

== Cast ==
- Lauren D'Avella as the title character, Sexina; "Sexina (Lauren D’Avella) is the reigning queen of the pop universe. By night (or whatever), she’s a black-leather-clad crime fighter, busting corruption in the music industry."
  - Luis Jose Lopez as Lance Canyon; "...Sexina's strongest competition, the egocentric womanizer Lance Canyon (Luis Jose Lopez)."
- Adam West as the film's villain, leader of Glitz Records; "...“The Boss” of Glitz Records (Adam West! Really!), who’s trying to take over the music world with a robotic boy band...."
  - Cash Tilton as the scientist whose technology has been exploited by Adam West's villain
- Kelly Fernald as Vera; "...about a high school reject (Vera, played by Kellie Fernald) getting even with her mean-girl tormentors and doing it with the football team’s star quarterback." Vera is also the winner of an essay contest that leads Sexina to performing at her high school.
  - Ronald J. Zambor as the quarterback that Vera has a crush on.
- Annie Golden, who has a cameo role of about one minute.

== Critical reception ==
DVD Talk, "Sexina is not a painful experience, far from the worst the genre has to offer (even landing ever-so-slightly above the median), but it's a directionless movie, a collection of middling jokes collected in a kitchen sink. Writer / director Erik Sharkey takes a bunch of ideas and refuses to make an overt effort to glue them all together, half-heartedly aiming at his handful of satirical targets with a looseness that practically disqualifies the movie from even being a spoof."

New Times Broward-Palm Beach, "It’s all very stupid, very self-conscious, and in excruciatingly poor taste (witness the breathtaking number of gay jokes proffered by the football coach, Sexina’s assistant, and Mr. West). But by the time a would-be assassin is mauled to death for no good reason by a man in a cheap bear costume, you’re convinced that filmmaker Erik Sharkey is nuts enough to try anything. That’s worth a lot."
