= Leigh Raven =

American pornographic film actress

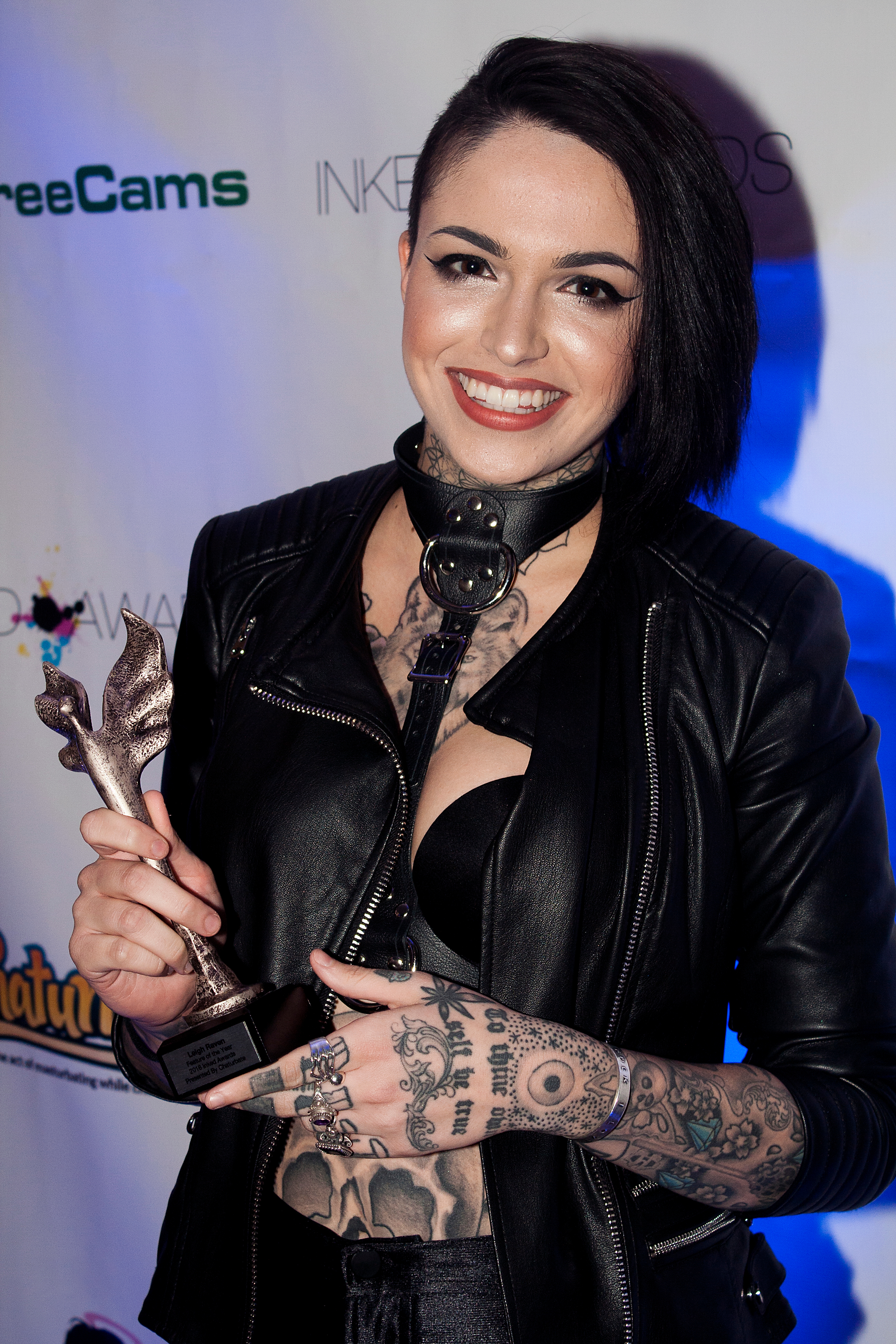
- Raven at the 2016 Inked Awards
- Other name: Mistress Baby
- Occupation: Pornographic film actress
- Years active: 2016–present

Leigh Raven is an American pornographic film actress and director who has frequently appeared in BDSM films.

== Life and career ==
In 2017, Raven announced that she was dating fellow pornographic actress Nikki Hearts. They had married by 2018, having since produced adult films together. That same year, Raven signed a contract with OC Modeling, as well as launching her own personal website.

In 2023 and 2024, Raven made her transition into directing for Kink.com. At this time, she also adopted the persona 'Mistress Baby'. In 2026, she won her first XMA Award for her work with Kink. She has also won AltPorn and Inked awards.

Raven has also stated that her tattoos have made it difficult to be cast within some adult films.

=== Activism ===
In March 2018, Raven alleged in a YouTube video by Nikki Hearts that actor Rico Strong had abused her in a Black Payback scene filmed for director Just Dave on March 6, where Strong allegedly violated her boundaries and was physically abusive. She stated that she had filed a police report which had led to an investigation. Raven's allegations surfaced amidst the wider MeToo movement, and as the adult film industry also contended with past abuse accusations.

Just Dave, Strong, and Tofu, a production assistant for the Raven shoot, denied Raven's version of events. Just Dave provided the LAPD, as well as news outlets like AVN and Jezebel, with what he cited as being exculpatory unedited behind-the-scenes footage of Raven's Black Payback shoot in April 2018. The footage appeared to contradict Raven's allegations, as she stated in post-shoot debrief interviews that she felt safe and the staff had respected her boundaries; that she had not been harassed and did not need to cut the scene for any reason; and that she would work with the company again. The Los Angeles District Attorney, Ruben Arellano, later declined to press charges against Black Payback after reviewing the evidence presented by Raven and Just Dave. Raven declined to seek a civil suit against Strong or Just Dave, stating that she wanted Just Dave removed from the adult film industry after her own experience and the experiences of others that had reached out after the allegations were made public. The scene was later released, mocking Raven and downplaying her accusations, receiving criticism for the release. Raven and Hearts stated the accusations also caused them to lose work. The controversy surrounding the allegations also led to Raven's exclusion from the 2019 Urban X Awards, where Strong was named Male Performer of the Year.
