= Model Hunger =

- Directed by: Debbie Rochon
- Written by: James Morgart; Debbie Rochon
- Produced by: James Morgart
- Starring: Lynn Lowry; Tiffany Shepis; Carmine Capobianco
- Distributed by: Wild Eye Releasing
- Release date: 2016
- Country: United States
- Language: English

Model Hunger is a 2016 American horror movie starring Lynn Lowry and Tiffany Shepis and the directorial debut of Debbie Rochon, it is distributed by Wild Eye Releasing.

== Plot ==
Ginny, an ex-pin-up model now older and put out to pasture by the industry, lusts for bloody revenge on beautiful young women via cannibalism and murder. Her neighbors, Debbie and Sal, become suspicious of Ginny’s homicidal tendencies.

== Critical reception ==
Dread Central (2016), “Overall, Model Hunger will make gorehounds happy as well as fans of indie shockers, but more so it will make people think twice about shaming individuals for fun. There is a lesson to be learned here, and it is a painful, bloody one at that.

Dread Central (2015), “If you look past some of Model Hunger‘s shortcomings, you’re going to find a solid story, a fantastic lead actress, and some laughs, gross-outs, and well-developed tension along the way.”

Athens Banner-Herald, “"Model Hunger" is challenging stuff, but it's also revolutionary and progressive.”
