= Bloody Muscle Body Builder in Hell =

- Directed by: Shinichi Fukazawa
- Written by: Shinichi Fukazawa
- Produced by: Shinichi Fukazawa
- Starring: Shinichi Fukazawa; Masaaki Kai; Asako Nosaka
- Cinematography: Shinichi Okuda
- Edited by: Shinichi Fukazawa
- Music by: Notzan Act
- Distributed by: Terracotta Distribution; Visual Vengence
- Release date: 2014
- Running time: 63 minutes
- Country: Japan
- Language: Japanese

Bloody Muscle Body Builder in Hell is a Japanese horror film written, directed by and starring Shinichi Fukazawa. The film has been called the Japanese Evil Dead.

== Plot ==
A Japanese bodybuilder agrees to help his photojournalist ex-girlfriend investigate a haunted house. With the assistance of a professional psychic they travel to an old house where they become trapped inside by a bloodthirsty ghost.

== Cast ==
- Shinichi Fukazawa as Shinji
- Masaaki Kai
- Masahiro Kai
- Aki Tama Mai
- Asako Nosaka

== Production and release ==
Filmed in 1995 and completed in 2009, the film was released in its home country in 2014 and internationally in 2017 before getting a Blu-ray release by Visual Vengeance in 2022.

== Critical reception ==
Dread Central, "Ultimately, Bloody Muscle Body Builder in Hell isn't essential viewing, but it's a breezy good time while it lasts, and the fun that was had behind the camera is more than reflected on screen."

Bloody Disgusting, "What initially appealed to me about The Evil Dead is how Raimi and company's scrappy, do-it-yourself ethic translates on screen. Beyond being an effective horror movie, it feels like it was made by a group of friends for fun rather than commerce. Bloody Muscle Body Builder in Hell embodies that same spirit, albeit with even more limited means. It may have taken decades to be properly released, but I'm grateful Fukazawa never gave up on it.
