= Scary Stories (documentary) =

- Directed by: Cody Meirick
- Starring: Alvin Schwartz; Peter Schwartz
- Distributed by: Wild Eye Releasing
- Release date: 2018
- Running time: 84 minutes
- Country: United States
- Language: English

Scary Stories is a 2018 documentary film directed by Cody Meirick and distributed by Wild Eye Releasing.

== Overview ==
Documentary about the impact of author Alvin Schwartz’s Scary Stories to Tell in the Dark young adult literature book series.

== Critical reception ==
The Hollywood Reporter wrote that “those who grew up reading Scary Stores to Tell in the Dark will no doubt be thrilled by this cinematic tribute. And those who didn’t may find themselves compelled to read the books to find out for themselves what all the fuss is about.”

Los Angeles Times noted that, “This doc excels, though, as a work of critical appreciation. Academics, Schwartz peers and fans alike all break down their favorite stories, describing with great passion how they play on specific adolescent fears. At its best, “Scary Stories” explains why these books endure: because they let their young audience know that even in their worst nightmares, they’re not alone.”
