= Evil Head =

- DVD released by Burning Angel
- Directed by: Doug Sakmann
- Screenplay by: Joanna Angel; Doug Sakmann
- Based on: The Evil Dead by Sam Raimi
- Produced by: Joanna Angel; Mitch Fontaine
- Starring: Danny Wylde; Joanna Angel; Tommy Pistol; Veruca James; Kleio Valentien; Dana DeArmond
- Cinematography: Mike Quasar
- Edited by: Sonny Malone
- Music by: Mr. 19
- Production company: Burning Angel
- Distributed by: Voyeur Media; Burning Angel
- Release date: October 24, 2012 (United States)
- Running time: 147 minutes
- Country: United States
- Language: English

Evil Head is a 2012 American pornographic horror comedy film written and directed by Doug Sakmann, and co-written by Joanna Angel. It is based on the 1981 horror film The Evil Dead by Sam Raimi.

== Plot ==
For their vacation, Ash, his wife Linda, their friend Scotty, and his wife Shelly travel to an apparently abandoned woodland cabin, where they find a recorder, audio reels, and an old book. Scotty plays one of the reels, which were made by the cabin's owners, Professor Raymond Knowby, and his wife, Henrietta. The reel reveals that the professor and his wife were working on translating the book, a seemingly demonic sex guide known as the Necronomicum Ex-Mortis. While reciting a mantra that he found in the Necronomicum, Knowby seemingly went insane, laughing maniacally as he repeated the words over and over again, awakening an evil force.

The group ignores the reel, and while Shelly goes to lie down, Ash, Linda, and Scotty have a threesome in a bedroom. Shelly walks in on the trio and, distraught over Scotty's infidelity, runs out into the forest, where she is violated by possessed trees that turn her into a "Deadite". Shelly returns to the cabin, knocks Ash out, and stabs Linda with a piece of bark that she pulls out of her vagina, infecting the other woman with the evil. Shelly proceeds to seduce Scotty, have sex with him, and rip his throat and testicles out.

When Shelly tries to attack Linda, Ash fends her off with a fireplace poker, and locks her in the cellar, but she escapes, and begins having sex with the now demonic Linda. Aroused by the sight of the two Deadites going at it, Ash tries fingering Shelly, which results in his hand becoming possessed. Ash is forced to cut his hand off with a chainsaw, which he then uses to kill Shelly by forcing her to "ride" the tool's blade.

Linda, who has returned to normal, confronts Ash with a locket identical to the one that he had earlier given her. Inside the locket is a picture of Ash having sex with another woman, which angers Linda to the point of causing her to turn back into a Deadite. Ash and Linda wind up having sex; afterward, Ash beheads Linda with the chainsaw, and takes her body out into the woods to dispose of it. Linda's still-living severed head taunts Ash, annoying him into masturbating onto it out of spite.

Ash returns to the cabin, and goes into hysterics when the furniture and fixtures (including a mounted deer head) go haywire. Outside, Linda (who has reattached her head) rises from the grave, along with Deadite versions of two of Ash's ex-girlfriends. Ash tries to kill the Deadites with the chainsaw (which he has replaced his missing hand with) but it will not start, leaving him unable to fight off the demonesses as they force him into an orgy. The reverse gangbang ends with Ash using the now functional chainsaw to dismember the undead women as he quips, "Groovy!"

== Cast ==
- Joanna Angel as Linda Williams
- Tommy Pistol as Ashley J. Williams
- Kleio Valentien as Shelly
- Danny Wylde as Scotty
- Veruca James as Deadite #1
- Dana DeArmond as Deadite #2
- Lloyd Kaufman as Professor Raymond Knowby

== Reception ==
Ain't It Cool News responded positively to the film, noting that it was "a humorous homage" and that "the story bits, what little there are, are pretty entertaining" before concluding, "Sure, there will be those who will turn their noses up to Evil Head, but in this wide world of horror, surely there is room for the porn horror subgenre; especially in this case when it apes the original so well". Peter Warren of AVN gave Evil Head a perfect score of 5, finding it to be "every bit the rollicking rollercoaster ride of gleeful grotesquery one could hope for" and "without question one of the most outstanding productions to ever come out of Burning Angel". Roger T. Pipe, who awarded the film an 8/12, stated Evil Head was "funny, well shot and sexy as fuck" while Don Houston of XCritic categorized it as "highly recommended" after deeming it "remarkably entertaining as a porno horror hybrid fuck flick".

A grade of 3/5 was given to Evil Head by Inked Angels, which opined, "The sex parts are just mediocre. Burning Angel has released a lot hotter and better material than this before". A similarly lukewarm response came from VideoTramp, which praised the cinematography and sex scenes, while criticizing performances, and the film's humor.
