= Tsunambee =

- Directed by: Milko Davis; Thomas Martwick
- Written by: Milko Davis
- Starring: Stacy Pederson; Ruselis Aumeen Perry; Shale Le Page; Maria DeCoste; Thea Saccoliti; Charlie Aligaen; Jeff Pederson
- Music by: Przemyslaw Kopczyk; Alvaro Morello
- Distributed by: Wild Eye Releasing
- Release date: April 2015
- Running time: 82 minutes
- Country: United States
- Language: English

Tsunambee is a 2015 American action horror film directed by Milko Davis and Thomas Martwick, starring Stacy Pederson, Ruselis Aumeen Perry, Shale Le Page, Maria DeCoste, Thea Saccoliti, Charlie Aligaen and Jeff Pederson.

== Plot ==
After series of apocalyptic events, a group of survivors come face to face with an even bigger nightmare, swarms of gigantic killer bees hellbent on bringing about the end of the world.

== Cast ==
- Stacy Pederson as Sheriff Lindsey Feargo
- Ruselis Aumeen Perry as JB
- Shale Le Page as Jesse
- Maria DeCoste as Chica
- Thea Saccoliti as Cassandra
- Charlie Aligaen as Tubs
- Jeff Pederson as Farmer
- Jordan Chesnut as Jordan
- Aaron Goodman as Kroger

== Release ==
The film premiered in April 2015. It was released on VOD on 13 June 2017.

== Reception ==
Charlie Cargile of PopHorror wrote that it "struggles with what it wants to be and just winds up becoming a jumbled mess of a film."

Matt Boiselle of Dread Central rated the film 1 star out of 5 and wrote: "From top to bottom, front to back, this entire watch was one of catastrophic proportions, complete with insanely wretched acting, utter ridiculousness when it came to rational thought patterns, and the most God-awful CGI that I believe I’ve ever seen under one movie’s globe – all totaling up to an absolute debacle for one’s eyes."

Paul Mount of Starburst rated the film 1 star out of 10 and wrote: "Terrible performances abound, the incidental music rarely fits in with what’s happening on-screen and even a ‘shock’ ending is utterly unable to redeem a film which has been so inept and, most unforgivably, bloody boring for so long."
