= Last Man Standing (1987 film) =

- Directed by: Damian Lee
- Written by: Damian Lee; David Mitchell
- Produced by: Damian Lee; David Mitchell
- Starring: Vernon Wells
- Cinematography: Ludek Bogner
- Edited by: Gary Zubeck
- Music by: Charlie Barnett
- Production company: Rose and Ruby Productions
- Distributed by: Shapiro Entertainment
- Release date: October 1987 (MIFED (Mercato internazionale del film e del documentario))
- Running time: 90 minutes
- Country: Canada
- Language: English

Last Man Standing is a 1987 sports action film directed by Damian Lee. In the film, a mistreated patient of a mental asylum is released and seeks a new career in underground bare-knuckle fighting.

== Plot ==
Roo Marcus has recently been released from the inhumane conditions of a mental institution and enters into the world of underground bare-knuckle fighting.

== Cast ==
- Vernon Wells as Roo Marcus
- William Sanderson as Casper
- Michael Copeman as Napoleon
- Sonja Belliveau as Charlie
- Frank Moore as Tenny
- Réal Andrews as Razor
- Pete Dempster as Cannon
- Franco Columbu as Batty
- Danny Burnes as Gus
- George Chuvalo as Maxx
- Damian Lee as Sully
- Dave Schaller as Patch
- Kim Coates as Mr. Regan
- Lolita Davidovich as Groupie (as Lolita David)

== Alternate titles ==
Last Man Standing was released under various other titles in different regions including Circle Man and Manfighter.
