= Cruel Summer (2016 film) =

2016 British film by Phillip Escott and Craig Newman

- Promotional poster
- Directed by: Phillip Escott; Craig Newman
- Written by: Phillip Escott; Craig Newman
- Produced by: Phillip Escott; Craig Newman; Sean Langton
- Starring: Danny Miller; Reece Douglas; Natalie Martins; Richard Pawulski
- Cinematography: Lucas Tucknott
- Edited by: Phillip Escott
- Music by: Josef Prygodzicz
- Production company: 441 Films
- Distributed by: Solo Releasing; Wild Eye Releasing
- Release dates: August 27, 2016 (London); February 27, 2018 (United States)
- Running time: 80 minutes
- Country: United Kingdom
- Language: English

Cruel Summer is a 2016 British horror drama film written and directed by Phillip Escott and Craig Newman in their directorial debuts. It stars Danny Miller, Reece Douglas, Natalie Martins and Richard Pawulski. It premiered at FrightFest on August 27, 2016, and was released in the United States by Wild Eye Releasing on February 27, 2018.

== Premise ==
Danny, an autistic teenager, is bullied and tormented by a group of thugs after he ventures into the woods alone for a camping trip. Their rage against him is based on lies spread by a local girl, who claims Danny committed a crime that he had nothing to do with.

== Cast ==
- Richard Pawulski as Danny
- Danny Miller as Nicholas
- Reece Douglas as Calvin
- Natalie Martins as Julia
- Gary Knowles as Danny's Dad
- Grace Dixon as Danny's Mum
- Thomas 'Verb T' Conning as Shop Keeper

== Production ==
Escott and Newman were inspired to write the script for their debut feature after a wave of knife crimes that made headlines around the UK in 2012/2013. The biggest influence however, was the 2004 murder of British teen, Terry Lee Hurst.

The film was shot over ten days on a micro-budget, with the directors self-financing the production.

== Critical reception ==
Matt Boiselle of DreadCentral called the film "unapologetic, unwavering, and uneasy to stomach." Given the shocking nature of the film, Bryan Yentz of Rue Morgue questioned, "whether or not Cruel Summer is even necessary, exploitative or both."
