= Ebola Zombies =

- Directed by: Samuel Leong
- Written by: Samuel Leong
- Starring: Samuel Leong; Cash Lee; Jack Chan
- Distributed by: Wild Eye Releasing
- Release date: 2015
- Country: Hong Kong
- Language: Mandarin

Ebola Zombies (also known as SARS Zombies and Zombie Raid) is a 2015 Hong Kong zombie film written and directed and starring Samuel Leong.

== Plot ==
Thieves attempting to pull off a heist break into an industrial facility where illegal experiments are being performed on corpses that transform them into fleshing eating zombies.

== Title controversy ==
The film's title was changed by the United States distributor, Wild Eye Releasing, to Ebola Zombies while being sold at the 2014 American Film Market. The last minute title change (two weeks earlier the film was titled SARS Zombies) was meant to capitalize on the recent Ebola outbreak in the news at the time. It was reported that some attending the 2014 American Film Market found the new Ebola title amusing while others did not.

== Critical reception ==
CinemaBlend, "I think we can all agree that this movie looks like low-budget madness, but there’s a story here that makes it sound even more fantastic."

Horror Society, "Overall, Ebola Zombies is an action packed horror film which is something the horror community has been lacking recently. If you grew up on the Cannon action films of the 80s then you will enjoy this one!"
