= Wild Eye Releasing =

American independent film distributor

- Company type: Film distributor
- Industry: Entertainment
- Headquarters: New Jersey, U.S.
- Key people: Rob Hauschild
- Products: Motion pictures
- Website: wildeyereleasing.com

Wild Eye Releasing, headquartered in New Jersey, is an American distributor of independent motion pictures in theaters, on DVD, Blu-ray and video on demand. The company specializes in the distribution of horror and other genre films.

== Titles ==
Films distributed by Wild Eye Releasing include Cargo, Tales of Poe, Sexina starring Adam West, The Last House with Jason Mewes and Felissa Rose, Shark Exorcist, Ebola Zombies, Sharkenstein, Tsunambee, The VelociPastor, Bloody Muscle Body Builder in Hell, the documentary Scary Stories about the work of young adult literature author Alvin Schwartz, Fisted!, Cocaine Shark and Model Hunger which was the directorial debut of actress Debbie Rochon.

== Media ==
HuffPost wrote, "If you think Wild Eye Releasing's techniques sound inspired by those of “B” movie king Roger Corman, you would be right. President Rob Hauschild is heavily inspired by the work and career of Corman", adding, "Corman is a spiritual father,” Rob says. “Many things can be learned from him about marketing a film, but what I learned most is to take a risk on new, emerging talent and to facilitate a launching pad for that talent into the larger industry.""

== Visual Vengeance ==
In 2022, it was announced that Wild Eye Releasing had a new sister label, Visual Vengeance, a Blu-ray collector's distributor specializing in vintage genre independent films from the 1980s though the 2000s.

== Selected filmography ==
Year	Title	Notes
2009	Caesar and Otto's Summer Camp Massacre	
2012	Unauthorized and Proud of It: Todd Loren's Rock 'N' Roll Comics	
2012	Caesar and Otto's Deadly Xmas	
2013	Showgirls 2: Penny's from Heaven	
2013	The Search for Weng Weng	
2014	Sexina	
2014	My Name Is 'A' by Anonymous	
2014	President Wolfman	
2015	The Last House	
2015	Tsunambee	
2015	Caesar and Otto's Paranormal Halloween	
2015	Magnetic	
2015	The Amazing Bulk	
2016	Ebola Zombies	
2016	Shark Exorcist	
2016	Model Hunger	
2016	Sharkenstein	
2016	Tales of Poe	
2018	Cargo	
2018	2047: Virtual Revolution	
2018	Cruel Summer	
2019	Scary Stories	
2019	The VelociPastor	
2019	Scrawl	
2020	Frames of Fear 3	
2021	Black Holler	
2022	Don't Fuck in the Woods 2	
2022	The Dead Girl In Apartment 03	
2022	Moonchild	
2022	Bloody Muscle Body Builder in Hell	
2025	Sharks N Da Hood	
2025	Cocaine Shark	
2025	Fisted!	
