= Jurassic City =

2015 science fantasy film by Sean Cain

- Official poster
- Directed by: Sean Cain
- Written by: Sean Cain
- Produced by: Anthony Fankhauser
- Starring: Ray Wise; Kevin Gage; Vernon Wells; Robert LaSardo
- Cinematography: Stuart Brereton
- Edited by: Sean Cain
- Music by: Mario Salvucci
- Distributed by: Vertical Entertainment
- Release date: February 3, 2015
- Running time: 88 minutes
- Country: United States
- Language: English

Jurassic City is a 2015 American independent fantasy film written, edited, and directed by Sean Cain. The film, produced by Anthony Fankhauser, stars Ray Wise, Kevin Gage, Vernon Wells, Robert LaSardo, Dana Melanie, Sofia Mattsson, Kayla Carlyle, Monique Parent, and Jack Forcinito.

The film was released direct-to-DVD on January 9, 2015, in Japan, and on February 3 in the United States. The film is a mockbuster of the Jurassic Park series.

== Plot ==
When a top secret Black Ops facility is breached from within by genetically modified Monolophosaurus, a final shipment is re-routed to a nearby prison to secure a half dozen of the beasts.

A trio of sorority girls (who are temporary 'guests' after getting busted for high-jinx after a particularly obnoxious party) find themselves trapped in the prison when these dinosaurs escape and go on a vicious rampage killing 90% of the prison population including the guards.

Forced to team up with the remaining prisoners they find themselves pushed deeper and deeper into the bowels of the prison to find a way out. Only they aren't sure if their new 'friends' are any better than the Monolophosaurus who plan on eating them.

And to make matters worse the Black Ops organization enters the prison not only to collect their 'property', but also permanently silence anyone with knowledge of the situation.

== Cast ==
- Ray Wise as Warden Lewis, Head of The Prison Facility
- Kevin Gage as Doyle
- Vernon Wells as Agent LaFranco
- Robert LaSardo as Corporal Ignacio
- Dana Melanie as Pippi
- Sofia Mattsson as Stephanie, Rich Wild Party Girl
- Kayla Carlyle as Sarah
- Jack Forcinito as Captain Talbot
- Monique Parent as Scarlett
- Vanessa V. Johnston as Erika
- Kelcey Watson as Armstrong
- Timothy Muskatell as "Bear"
- Jimmy Williams as Manny
- Trista Robinson as Kris

== See also ==
- List of films featuring dinosaurs
