= Craig McMahon =

Australian actor

Craig McMahon is an Australian actor and television personality.

He has worked as a presenter on the Network Ten's children's show Totally Wild and previously, with his wife Dominique, he co-hosted the children's TV series In the Box. He has worked on other shows including Neighbours, Fat Cow Motel and The Man From Snowy River.

He was nominated as a finalist for Cleo's Bachelor of the Year in 2000.

He and his wife Dominique co-founded the Film & Television Studio International, which runs acting classes in Brisbane and Melbourne. McMahon is the founder and artistic director whilst his wife is the co-founder and managing director.

McMahon also runs McMahon Management (MCM), an agency that represents Australian actors including Luke Mitchell, Esther Jackie Anderson, Gabrielle Fitzpatrick, Daniel Daperis, Glenda Linscott, Mauricio Merino Jr, Chris Milligan and Andrew James Morley.
