= Sean Cain =

American film director

- Born: August 31, 1970 (age 56); Concord, California, U.S.
- Education: Concord High School (California); San Francisco State University
- Occupations: Film director, editor, producer, writer

Sean Cain (born August 31, 1970) is an American film director, editor, producer and writer.

== Background ==
Originally hailing from the San Francisco Bay Area, Cain directed his first feature, Naked Beneath the Water which he used to graduate the cinema program at San Francisco State in 1995. This film was a very low budget psychological horror film, was shunned by his colleagues at college, but sold well on VHS through underground horror magazines such as Film Threat and Alternative Cinema.

In early 2002 that Cain saw many of the low budget horror titles originally released on VHS were finding new life on DVD. Re-shooting about 60% of Naked Beneath the Water he finally achieved proper distribution on DVD in 2008. Cain now resides in Los Angeles where he created Velvet Hammer Films with his longtime business partner, Jim Wright. Since 2008 he has gone on to direct six more films, Silent Night, Zombie Night, (with The Walking Dead alumnus Lew Temple) Breath of Hate, (which stars Jason Mewes, best known from the Kevin Smith films as "Jay") and SyFy fare such as Jurassic City, (with Ray Wise) Terror Birds, Eruption LA. Cain's seventh film, Dead By Dawn is getting back to his horror roots. He has also served on numerous horror projects as a producer and in 2009 was dubbed the 'Indie Horror Specialist' by Michael Gingold at Fangoria.

== Partial filmography ==
=== Director ===
- Dead By Dawn (2020)
- Eruption LA (2018)
- Terror Birds (2016)
- The Last House (2016)
- Jurassic City (2015)
- Rise of the Dinosaurs (2013) (Los Angeles re-shoots)
- Breath of Hate (2011)
- Silent Night, Zombie Night (2009)
- Naked Beneath the Water (2006)

=== Producer ===
- Dead By Dawn (2020)
- Breath of Hate (2011)
- Silent Night, Zombie Night (2009)
- Warning!!! Pedophile Released (2009)
- Someone's Knocking at the Door (2009)
- Naked Beneath the Water (2006)

=== Editor ===
- Psycho Party Planner (2020)
- Dead By Dawn (2020)
- My Adventures with Santa (2019)
- Sunrise in Heaven (2019)
- My Best Friend's Christmas (2019)
- Stressed to Death (2019)
- Paradise Prey (2019)
- A Christmas Arrangement (2018)
- The Perfect Mother (2018)
- Sins and Seduction (2018)
- Left for Dead (2018)
- Babysitter's Nightmare (2018)
- Eruption LA (2018)
- Deadly Matrimony (2018)
- The Neighborhood Nightmare (2018)
- The Good Nanny (2017)
- 10 Year Reunion (2016)
- Terror Birds (2016)
- Honeymoon From Hell (2016)
- Jurassic City (2015)
- LA Apocalypse (2014)
- Utero (2014)
- Incarnate (2014)
- Noirland (2014)
- Like a Bat Out of Hell (2013)
- Rise of the Dinosaurs (2013)
- Sand Sharks (2011)
- Breath of Hate (2011)
- The Perfect House (2010)
- Someone's Knocking at the Door (2009)
- Hollywood Confidential (2008)
- Naked Beneath the Water (2006)
- Zombiegeddon (2003)
