= D&E Media =

American pornographic production company

D&E Media, LLC, also known as DukeDollars, is a Delaware-incorporated, limited liability, American independent pornographic film company based in East Orange, Essex County, New Jersey. It has been operating since 2003 and is best known for producing Internet gonzo pornography series centered on erotic humiliation, race play, and rough sex, like Facial Abuse and Ghetto Gaggers.

D&E Media content has been criticized by adult film industry personnel and others, though the company has also been defended and praised by prominent industry organizations and figures like AVN, Bryan Gozzling, and Steve Holmes.

== History ==
D&E Media, as DukeDollars, has been operating since 2003 and is located in East Orange, Essex County, New Jersey. The company's CEO is Donald Vollenweider.

DukeDollars was one of the sponsors of the Players Ball held at the Shelter Pointe Hotel in San Diego during the 2005 Cybernet Expo in April and acquired a rival company, Evil Genius Cash, in August 2008. It updated to "Duke Dollars Ver. 2" in 2009, and its series Facial Abuse won in the category "Most Extreme" in RabbitsReviews Best of the Web 2010. The company signed on with digital payment processor SegPay in 2012.

Steve Holmes began visiting the sets of Facial Abuse in 2018 and performed in scenes for them for his YouTube docuseries Behind the Porn Scenes. According to Holmes, he wanted to show "a violent rough scene can be totally consensual" and that the casts and crews of such scenes are "all professionals and work as a team."

D&E Media and another company, Criterion Management, were sued by a creditor, Isprime, in April 2019. The case was dismissed by the court without prejudice in December 2020.

== Content ==
Many D&E Media series, such as the flagship one, Facial Abuse, are premised around men engaging in erotic humiliation and rough sex with women, who are often subject to being spat on, choking, irrumatio-induced vomiting, slaps, and verbal degradation such as, in the case of a Facial Abuse scene starring Kenzie Green, "You're a product of unprotected sex. You're an accident. Hence, y'know destiny fulfilled. Now you wanna be a whore."

Multiple D&E Media series focus on race play, with Ghetto Gaggers (established in 2004) featuring White men dominating Black women and Latina Abuse (established in September 2006) featuring White men dominating Latin women. Black on Black Crime (established in 2010) features Black men dominating Black women, while another series, Black Payback, features Black men dominating White women. These series contain race-based insults like "puta" and "dumb White whore" and racial stereotypes, like force-feeding watermelon to Black women.

== Allegations of misconduct ==
Vanessa Belmond, who did a scene for Latina Abuse, said after the shoot, she looked like she was "beaten up" with "red marks all over my body" and "eyes [that] were so swollen that I looked like I had pink eye." According to Belmond, before the shoot, a Latina Abuse employee told her, "You're lucky you're not working for Ghetto Gaggers, we're meaner to the Black girls."

Clayra Beau, who did a Facial Abuse scene, stated while she knew beforehand the shoot would entail rough sex, she was still taken aback by how violent it was, claiming the irrumatio she was subjected to prevented her from using a safeword while her non-verbal gestures to the male performers that were supposed to signal for them to stop were ignored, with Beau noting, "I was clawing at their legs and slapping their thighs and they still wouldn't let up." According to Beau, the shoot left her with injuries, but the contract Facial Abuse had her sign had clauses preventing performers from seeking reparations for emotional or physical damages they may incur during a shoot; "Therefore they could literally fuck a girl up for life and she can do nothing about it. It's as close to rape as you can get in consensual porn and puts all pornographers in danger.

Miriam Weeks's pornographic film debut, and the scene for which she was recognized and outed as adult film actress Belle Knox, was a Facial Abuse scene directed by Jimmy Hooligan. Knox initially stated she enjoyed it and it was consensual and she was not coerced or harmed, but later noted the shoot was "not the best experience" because, "they try to figure out what makes you tick and fuck with you." According to Knox, she began dissociating as she was "hit, pushed, spit on," and mocked for being a "cutter" while also being verbally degraded. In retrospect, Knox stated, "No, it wasn't a negative experience, I just regret doing it. I don't like talking about it."

In July 2016, Gene Ross of AdultFYI reported that Charlie Ann, who agreed to do a Facial Abuse scene, opted out of it at the last minute, having reportedly done so because she was misled by Duke Skywalker about multiple aspects of the shoot and one for Sperm Suckers. According to Ann, Ernie, the booker for Facial Abuse, informed her before the Facial Abuse shoot was set to begin that sex acts Ann was reassured were voluntary were now mandatory, that Ann calling for a break at any time would stop the shoot entirely without her being paid, and that Ann was contractually prohibited from filing suit "for permanent bodily harm or injury" even though the shoot "may hurt me." In response to Ann's allegations, Skywalker asserted Ann had no intention of performing for his company and merely used it to pay for travel expenses so she could visit another adult film performer named Justin "Paul" Beaver.

In March 2018, Leigh Raven uploaded a video to YouTube in which she alleged she was sexually assaulted during a shoot for the Los Angeles-based series Black Payback, directed by Just Dave and co-starring Rico Strong. According to Raven, the roughness of the shoot's sex and the race play element of it were more intense than she was led to believe, her non-verbal gestures that were supposed to signal for Strong to stop were ignored, and instructions she gave about sexual positions she did not want to perform in were also ignored, causing her distress, pain, and injuries, including "a vaginal tear and a bruised cervix." Raven's video contained testimony from Riley Nixon, another actress who claimed to have been similarly mistreated during her own Black Payback shoot with Just Dave and Strong in January 2018. Just Dave, Strong, and Tofu, a production assistant for the Raven shoot, denied Raven's version of events.

Just Dave provided the LAPD, as well as news outlets like AVN and Jezebel, with what he cited as being exculpatory unedited behind-the-scenes footage of Raven's Black Payback shoot in April 2018. The footage appeared to contradict Raven's allegations, as she stated in post-shoot debrief interviews that she felt safe and the staff had respected her boundaries; that she had not been harassed and did not need to cut the scene for any reason; and that she would work with the company again. In June 2018, the L.A. District Attorney declined to press charges against Black Payback after reviewing the evidence presented by Raven and Just Dave; Raven decided not to file a civil suit against Black Payback. Raven subsequently argued that the police, as well as Cal/OSHA, were indifferent to her complaints about Black Payback, the behind-the-scenes footage released by Just Dave was allegedly missing hours of content, and the footage did not accurately reflect her true feelings and she only appeared compliant in it because she was frightened, dissociating, and attempting to leave the location safely. Nixon and Raven, who were mocked and called liars in promotional material for their Black Payback scenes, had their scenes uploaded to the Black Payback website in October 2018 and January 2019, respectively. Additional reporting also indicated that Raven was later excluded from at least one industry event following controversy surrounding the allegations and the evidence associated with them.

== Media coverage ==
Clips of Facial Abuse and Latina Abuse were featured in the 2015 Netflix documentary Hot Girls Wanted. Anna Merlan of Jezebel called the "choking, horrifying racial slurs and racialized scenarios" of the Latina Abuse scene "vile," while the Facial Abuse segment was labelled "easily the most disturbing scene of the documentary" by Barbara Herman of the International Business Times. Mark Kernes and Rachael Madori of AVN both defended Facial Abuse over how the studio was depicted in Hot Girls Wanted, the two feeling the portrayal was inaccurate and misleading, with Madori writing, "When things are said such as 'I didn't know I could tell him no' when referring to a porn shoot, I become confused. For every shoot a plethora of paperwork is reviewed and signed by the female and male talent, plainly stating that you are able to cancel and leave the set if you are made to feel uncomfortable in any way."

Facial Abuse was renamed "Facial Assault" in From Straight A's to XXX, a 2017 made-for-TV Lifetime film based on Belle Knox. Peter Warren, in his coverage of the film for AVN, wrote on the studio's portrayal, "Facial Abuse may not be the industry norm for respecting talent's boundaries, but it's a pretty safe bet they're not conducting business on this level of illegality."

=== Criticism ===
Adult film actress and director Sinnamon Love, in a February 2008 interview with Phonte Coleman for HipHopDX, claimed to have personally engaged in "a very long discourse" with the owner of Ghetto Gaggers about comments he made about African-American pornographic film actresses and her refusal to work for the website, which Love lambasted, stating, "I think that what they're doing crosses the line between BDSM and abuse. There's a difference. BDSM is all consensual. It's the same as consensual sex. But what [Ghetto Gaggers] does is purely abusive. You can see it. You can watch the women on those films and see the mood shift. You can watch the emotion change in their faces as they go from 'I can do this' to 'what the fuck have I gotten myself into?'"

In a July 2014 article about misogyny in the pornographic film industry written for HuffPost, Gail Dines singled Facial Abuse out, opining that the acts depicted in its videos were comparable to torture and that the website's own descriptions of the videos showed "no pretense that this is about consensual or mutually enjoyable sex."

Pornographer Rob Zicari, in a July 2016 article written for AdultFYI involving Ghetto Gaggers, called it "kind of disturbing" before writing, "I look at a site like Ghetto Gaggers and they have a girl sitting there and a guy says, 'Tell everybody that you're a dirty fucker. A low end piece of shit.' What kind of girl sits there and lets these guys do that? It's horrible."

Facial Abuse was briefly discussed by pornographer Holly Randall and adult film actress Evelyn Claire in a November 2023 episode of the former's podcast, Holly Randall Unfiltered, during which Randall derided it as a "misogynistic, derogatory, terrible website" and "everything we're ashamed of in the adult industry."

== See also ==
- Extreme Associates
- JM Productions
- Max Hardcore
