= The Telling (film) =

- DVD cover
- Directed by: Jeff Burr; Nicholas Carpenter
- Written by: Joe Lessard
- Produced by: Chuck Williams
- Starring: Holly Madison; Bridget Marquardt
- Cinematography: A.P. Rick
- Edited by: Sean Michael Beyer
- Music by: Kevin McDaniels
- Production companies: Breakout Entertainment; Chuck Williams Productions
- Release date: April 14, 2009
- Running time: 84 minutes
- Country: United States
- Language: English

The Telling is a 2009 horror film starring Holly Madison and Bridget Marquardt from the E! television series The Girls Next Door. The film is also the producing debut of Bridget Marquardt, who teamed up with veteran producer Chuck Williams. It is directed by Jeff Burr and first time director Nicholas Carpenter, grandson of filmmaker Hal Roach.

The making of the film was featured on the popular reality show The Girls Next Door. The majority of the filming took place at the Playboy Mansion and the Hollywood Castle. In addition to Madison and Marquardt, Playboy Playmate of the Year Sara Jean Underwood makes an appearance in the film.

== Plot ==
In the prologue, Brianna (Najarra Townsend), after being harshly rejected from a sorority, is found dead at a party from overdosing on prescription drugs and alcohol. Scrawled in lipstick on a nearby mirror are the words "You made me do this."

One year later, the exclusive and cruel sorority on campus, headed by Stephanie (Holly Madison), is in their final days of rush. For their final task, the three remaining pledges are required to tell the scariest story they know.

The first pledge, Tonya (Jessica Noboa), tells a true story she heard from a friend. In the story, Lily (Rebekah Kochan), is a beautiful blonde that lives with her boyfriend Tommy (Ryan Freeman) and his ex-girlfriend, Sarah, from England. Tommy works at a coffee shop, and finds a doll in a dumpster one day, which he brings home to Lily. At first, Lily thinks that Sarah has done something to the doll to mess with her. The doll kills Sarah first, stabbing her to death, then electrocutes Lily. The story ends with Tonya saying Tommy was convicted for the murders and was put away for life. The girls think that the story is good and take a shot.

The second story, told by Phoebe (Stephanie Sanborn), is about a former A-list actress, Eva DeMarco (Bridget Marquardt), who wants to be back on top. So she accepts a role from an elusive filmmaker (John D'Aquino) in a desolate region in Romania. However, the film crew has a deadly secret. Eva is drugged and has a dream where she's in a jail cell and killed by an angel with black wings (Christine Nguyen). When she wakes up, she goes to a dinner party for the shoot of the movie, where she discovers that all of the crew members are dead, and that they make snuff films. Eva is killed and becomes the newest member of the group. Again, the sorority girls like Phoebe's story and take another shot.

Finally, it is Haley's (Jean-Louise O'Sullivan) turn. She tells a story about a group of three girls, based on Stephanie, Amber, and Roxy. The story begins at the girls' home; the girls are about to go see a movie while their cable is being fixed. The girls come back home after one of them forgot to buy tickets in advance. Another girl suggests making prank calls. They call a man and tell him that he has won seven free pizzas. During the call, the man goes to answer the door and is killed. The girls overhear the man being killed and hesitantly call the police. The girls don't trust the cop who shows up, since he is by himself. After a killing spree occurs, only Anna and the cop remain. Anna kills the cop out of terror, thinking he is the killer. After shooting him five times, she walks into the hallway, where the real killer is waiting. She is promptly killed.

After all of the girls tell their stories, it is time for the sorority sisters to make their decision. First, Stephanie reveals the two newest members selected for their sorority are two other girls, Stacie and Rachel, who were inducted in a private rush separate from the official rush that Tonya, Phoebe, and Haley just underwent. Stephanie derides the three pledges for thinking that they could become members of the sorority. But then the sorority sisters start feeling the ill effects of the poisoned cookies provided by Haley. Haley, who turns out to be Brianna's half-sister, became a pledge solely to get close enough to the sorority (that she blames for Brianna's suicide) to kill them. She walks away from the sorority house, accompanied by her mother.

== Cast ==
- Holly Madison as Stephanie
- Bridget Marquardt as Eva DeMarco
- Nicole Zeoli as Roxy
- Lola LaBelle as Amber
- Jean-Louise O'Sullivan as Haley
- Tamara Witmer as Casey
- Stephanie Sanborn as Phoebe
- Jessica Noboa as Tonya
- Najarra Townsend as Brianna
- Rebekah Kochan as Lily
- Ryan Freeman as Tommy
- Kimshelley Garner as Sarah
- John D'Aquino as Victor
- Diane Salinger as Alina
- Ed Gale as Footcandle
- Veronique Vicari as Meridith
- Jessica Lowe as Jenna
- Amanda Ward as Anna

== Home release ==
The film was released on DVD April 14, 2009.
