= James Morgart =

American writer and filmmaker

- Born: James Morgart
- Occupations: Writer, filmmaker
- Years active: 2009–present

James Morgart is an American writer and filmmaker.

== Biography ==
Primarily involved in low-budget independent films, Morgart is best known for his work as a producer on the films Seed 2 (2014), Model Hunger (2016), and The Abduction of Jennifer Grayson (2017). With its debut at the 2015 Oldenburg Film Festival, Model Hunger is his most critically acclaimed film. The Debbie Rochon-directed, Morgart-scripted film was nominated for over two dozen awards on the independent film festival circuit, including a nomination for best independent film by the Rondo Hatton Classic Horror Awards. The Abduction of Jennifer Grayson, Morgart's most commercially successful film, was picked up by Redbox, Hulu, and AmazonPrime in June 2017.
