= Nicholas Carpenter =

American film director

Nicholas Andre Carpenter is an American film director. He worked as a set production assistant on TV and on films such as Thank You for Smoking (2005) before going on to direct the 2009 horror anthology The Telling.

== Early life ==
Nicholas Carpenter is the son of Scott Carpenter, one of the original Mercury astronauts, and Maria Roach Carpenter, daughter of film producer Hal Roach. Carpenter has a brother, Matthew Scott; four half-siblings from his father's first marriage, Marc Scott, Kristen Elaine, Candace Noxon and Robyn Jay; and a half sibling from his father's third marriage, Zachary Scott. Carpenter grew up in Los Angeles, where his father made his home after retiring from NASA in 1969.

== Personal life ==
In 2015, Carpenter became engaged to longtime girlfriend Bridget Marquardt. They have since privately married.
