= Joanna Angel =

American pornographic film actress (born 1980)

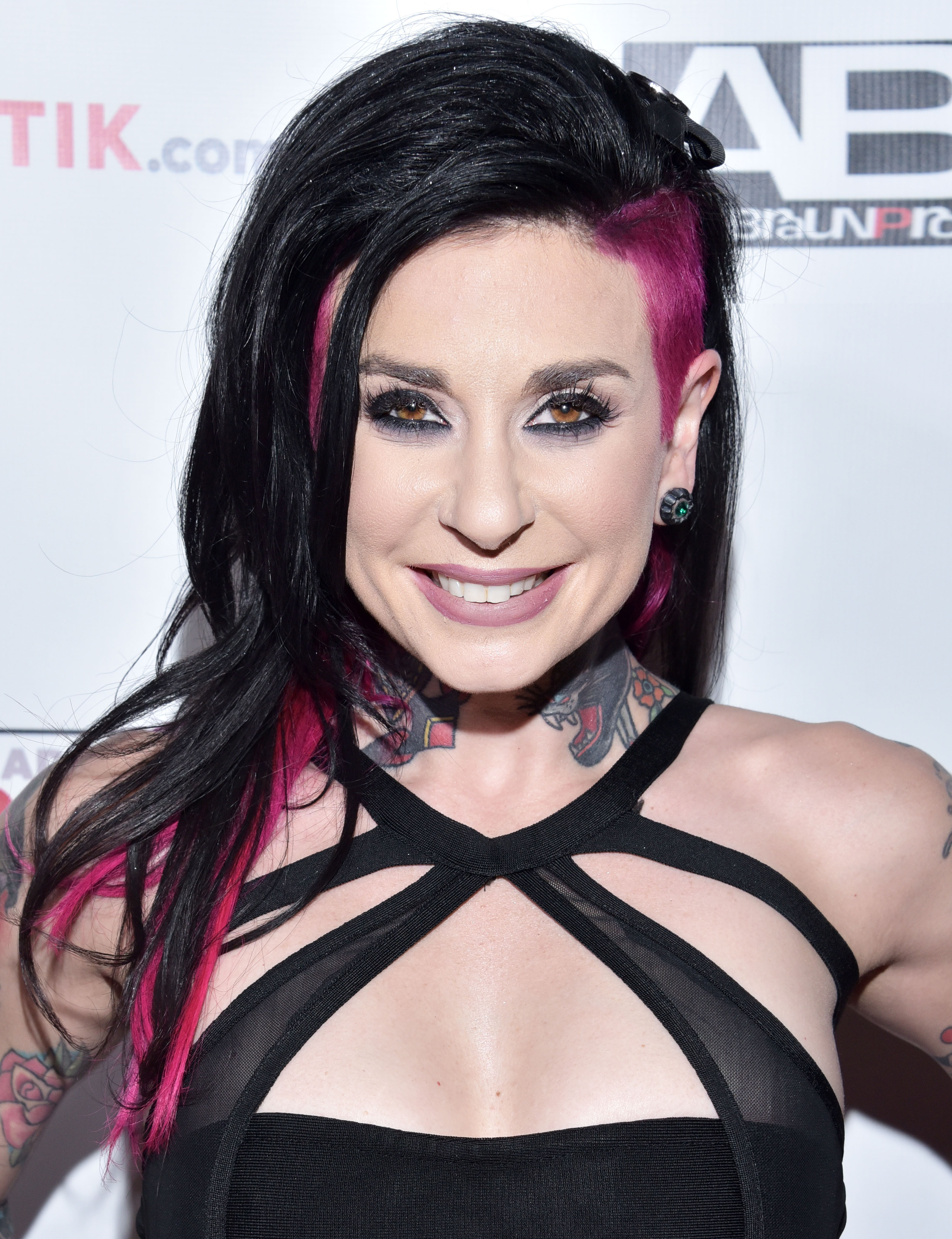
- Angel in 2017
- Born: Joanna Mostov; 1980 (age 45–46); New York City, U.S.
- Education: Rutgers University
- Height: 4 ft 11 in (1.50 m)
- Spouse: Aaron Thompson (m. 2016)
- Website: joannaangel.com

Joanna Mostov (born 1980), known professionally as Joanna Angel, is an American pornographic film actress, director, and writer of adult films. She founded the website BurningAngel.com in April 2002 with her roommate Mitch Fontaine, and has been credited with helping the growth of the alt porn genre. Launched as a response to websites such as SuicideGirls, the website featured alternative performers acting in exclusively hardcore scenes with a stronger focus on a punk aesthetic.

== Early life ==
Angel was born in Brooklyn, New York, to an Israeli mother and an American father. She was raised in River Edge, New Jersey, where she attended Cherry Hill Elementary School and graduated from River Dell Regional High School in 1998. After graduating, she enrolled in Rutgers University, where she earned a Bachelor of Arts degree in English literature with a minor in Film Studies.

According to the Jewish Telegraphic Agency, Angel is believed to be the first person in the pornography industry to have been raised in Orthodox Judaism. She worked in a kosher fast food restaurant in Teaneck during high school, then at an Applebee's and another restaurant called Happy's Health Grille during college. She eventually returned to Brooklyn and, with Mitch Fontaine, created the website BurningAngel.com.

== Pornography career ==
Angel is a former model for SuicideGirls, a softcore pornography website. In her early 20s she founded the "indie-punk-porn" site BurningAngel.com, featuring interviews and stories of sex with band members, along with nude photographs. Drawing inspiration from a live sex performance by porn actress Nina Hartley, Angel later began making hardcore movies for the site.

According to Encyclopedia of the Zombie, Angel is "regarded as a major influence in the mainstreaming of alt porn", and is credited with making the genre financially viable. She has produced and performed in several zombie-themed hardcore films: Re-Penetrator (2005), Dong of the Dead (2009), Evil Head (2012), and The Walking Dead: A Hardcore Parody (2013). She said in a 2006 interview, "I think [alt porn is] a movement. I think I've started something."

Angel has written, produced, directed and starred in films available exclusively through BurningAngel, as well as appearing in more traditionally distributed adult films. She was under an exclusive contract with VCA Pictures, which expired in March 2007, and was, at one time, represented by the adult talent agency Bad Ass Models.

=== Appearances ===
Following the success of BurningAngel, Angel has been featured in numerous magazines and newspapers, including The New York Times.

Angel briefly wrote a monthly sex advice column for Spin. She also contributed a chapter to the book Naked Ambition, edited by Carly Milne.

In 2010, Angel appeared in a public service announcement for the Free Speech Coalition on the topic of Internet copyright infringement of adult content, directed by Michael Whiteacre. The spot, entitled the "FSC All-Star Anti-Piracy PSA", found her in the company of adult performers such as Lisa Ann, Julie Meadows, Kimberly Kane, Ron Jeremy and Wicked Pictures contract stars, Alektra Blue and Kaylani Lei.

Angel was named by CNBC as one of the 12 most popular stars in porn in 2011, 2012, and 2013. CNBC noted that she owns her own studio and that the "punk look" that she and her other actors share has created a new genre in the porn industry, called alt porn. Also, in 2011, Angel made a cameo on the Adult Swim show Childrens Hospital, in the season three episode "Night Shift." She played herself as a porn star and family friend of Rob Corddry's character Dr. Blake.

Angel sometimes appears on Cracked.com as a friend of the columnists and appears in the music video for "Sound Wave Superior" by Emmure.

In 2013, Angel appeared in the independent film Scrapper, starring Michael Beach and Aidan Gillen, along with the ensemble cast musical comedy Skum Rocks! In 2014, she had roles in the crime drama The Owl in Echo Park and the Kevin Nealon comedy series Racquetball. She also appeared in the documentary film Doc of the Dead, which features Interviews with Max Brooks, Stuart Gordon, Jacqui Holland, Robert Kirkman, Greg Nicotero and Judith O'Dea.

== Personal life ==
Angel dated fellow porn star James Deen between 2005 and 2011. In 2015, Angel appeared on The Jason Ellis Show to give more details about her "violent and scary" six-year relationship with Deen. In 2016, Angel married Aaron "Small Hands" Thompson, another adult film actor.

== Publications ==
- Angel, Joanna (2015). "Porn Made Me Like My Parents". In Lee, Jiz (ed.). Coming Out Like a Porn Star: Essays on Pornography, Protection, and Privacy. Berkeley, Calif.: ThreeL Media. pp. 209–215. ISBN 978-0-9905571-6-6 – via the Internet Archive.

== Awards ==
- 2006 AVN Award – Most Outrageous Sex Scene (with Tommy Pistol) – Re-Penetrator
- 2007 XBIZ Award – Crossover Move of the Year
- 2008 XRCO Award – Best On-Screen Chemistry (with James Deen)
- 2009 XRCO Award – Best On-Screen Chemistry (with James Deen)
- 2011 AVN Award – Best Porn Star Website – JoannaAngel.com
- 2011 AVN Award – Best Solo Sex Scene – Rebel Girl
- 2011 NightMoves Award – Best Director (Editor's Choice)
- 2012 NightMoves Award – Best Individual Website (Editor's Choice) – JoannaAngel.com
- 2012 NightMoves Triple Play Award (Dancing/Performing/Directing)
- 2013 AVN Award – Best Porn Star Website – JoannaAngel.com
- 2013 AVN Award – Best Solo Sex Scene – Joanna Angel: Filthy Whore
- 2013 AVN – Game Changer
- 2013 NightMoves Award – Best Ink (Editor's Choice)
- 2013 NightMoves Hall of Fame inductee
- 2013 Inked Award – Achievement Award
- 2014 AVN Award – Best Porn Star Website – JoannaAngel.com (tied with AsaAkira.com)
- 2014 Inked Award – Director of the Year
- 2015 AVN Award – Best Porn Star Website – JoannaAngel.com
- 2015 Inked Award – Group Scene of the Year (with Skin Diamond, Kleio Valentien, Natalia Marie, James Deen, Mr. Pete, & Mick Blue) – All About That Orgy
- 2015 Inked Award – Hall of Fame inductee
- 2016 AVN Award – Best Porn Star Website – JoannaAngel.com
- 2016 AVN Hall of Fame inductee
- 2016 XRCO Hall of Fame inductee
- 2017 AVN Award – Best Supporting Actress – Cindy Queen of Hell
- 2017 AVN Award – Best Virtual Reality Sex Scene (with Abella Danger & Manuel Ferrara) – Angel 'n Danger
- 2017 Inked Award – Director of the Year
- 2017 NightMoves Award – Best Director, Parody (Editor's Choice)
- 2018 XBIZ Award – Best Actress, Comedy Release – Jews Love Black Cock
- 2018 XBIZ Award – Best Sex Scene, Comedy Release (with Abella Danger & Isiah Maxwell) – Jews Love Black Cock
- 2018 XRCO Award – Mainstream Adult Media Favorite
- 2019 AVN Award – Best Supporting Actress – A Trailer Park Taboo
- 2019 XBIZ Award – Best Actress, Comedy Release – Dirty Grandpa
- 2019 XBIZ Award – Best Supporting Actress – Talk Derby to Me
- 2019 XBIZ Award – Best Sex Scene, All-Sex Release (with Ricky Johnson, Isiah Maxwell, & Prince Yahshua) – Joanna Angel Gangbang: As Above, So Below
- 2019 NightMoves Award – Best Director, Non-Feature (Editor's Choice)
- 2019 Inked Award – Group Scene of the Year (with Karma Rx & Small Hands) – All Access POV 2
- 2020 XRCO Award – Best Director, Parody
- 2021 AVN Award – Best Screenplay, Comedy (with Shawn Alff) – Evil Tiki Babes
- 2022 XCritic Award – Best Director, Feature – Casey: A True Story
- 2022 AVN Award – Best Screenplay (with Casey Kisses & Shawn Alff) – Casey: A True Story
- 2023 Urban X Hall of Fame inductee
- 2024 AltStar Award – Fan Favorite Gonzo AltPorn Video (with Adalind Gray, Arielle Aquinas, Ashenn Fire, Aspen Jade, Baby Gemini, Darcy Diamond, Evilyn Ink, Kennedy Rose, Kitana Montana, Leah Michelle, Leya Falcon, Luna Lux, Michelle Masque, Robin Coffins, Sabien DeMonia, Sasha Syren, Taylor Nicole, Gunnar Stone, Ivan E. Rection, & Musa Phoenix) – Ink Motel 4
