= Ezra Buzzington =

American character actor for film and TV

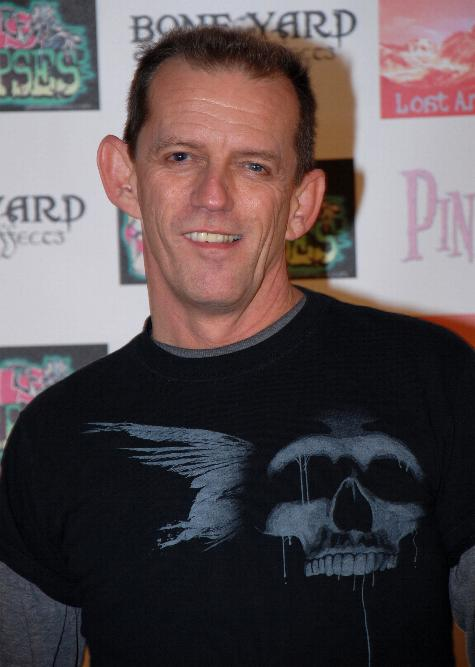
- Ezra Buzzington in 2008
- Born: Muncie, Indiana, U.S.
- Other name: Jonathan Harris
- Occupations: Film, television actor

Ezra Buzzington is an American character actor in film and television. A figure in underground cinema, Buzzington is also the founder of the Seattle Fringe Festival and co-founder of the New York International Fringe Festival.

== Career ==
With over 70 film credits (and dozens of television appearances), Buzzington has been referred to as "the Dennis Hopper of underground cinema". He has played characters ranging from "Weird Al the Waiter" in Ghost World to "Goggle" (a mutant) in The Hills Have Eyes and Tudley in the crime thriller film The Chair. He also appeared in the Academy Award-winning Best Picture The Artist and the Oscar-nominated The Fabelmans. He has worked with directors David Fincher (twice), Alexandre Aja (twice), Terry Zwigoff (twice), Rob Zombie (twice), David Slade (four times), Steven Spielberg, Christopher Nolan, Paul Thomas Anderson, George Clooney, Clint Eastwood and the Farrelly Brothers (also twice). He was a series regular in the role of Oswald Eisengrim on NBC's Crossbones opposite John Malkovich's Blackbeard, recurred on NBC's Law & Order True Crime as DDA Elliot Alhadeff, recurred on ABC's The Middle as the hard of hearing co-worker of Neil Flynn's character, starred in an episode of CBS's How I Met Your Mother and made several appearances on Justified for FX.

He is the founder of the Seattle Fringe Festival, co-founder of the New York International Fringe Festival with John Clancy and Aaron Beall, and an advisor for the Hollywood Fringe Festival during its first seven years. He is also the creator of Theatrism, a metaphysical approach to theatrical staging.

== Personal life ==
He lives in Los Angeles, California. He was born and raised in Muncie, Indiana.

== Filmography ==
=== Film ===
Year	Title	Role	Notes
1993	27 Pieces of Me	Bold	
1997	A, B, C... Manhattan	Zach	
1999	Fight Club	Inspector Dent	
1999	The Woman Chaser	Piano Player	
1999	Magnolia	Smiling Peanut Patron #2	
2000	The Million Dollar Hotel	Reporter	
2000	Me, Myself & Irene	Disabled Guy	
2001	Say It Isn't So	Stewart	
2001	Ghost World	Weird Al	
2001	The Man from Elysian Fields	Construction Forman	
2001	Rain	Officer Ben Patterson	
2002	Secretary	Typing Teacher	
2004	In the Land of Milk and Money	Haggard Dad	
2004	Zen Noir	Ed	
2005	The Rain Makers	Lou	
2006	Art School Confidential	Leslie	
2006	Bondage	Fred	
2006	The Hills Have Eyes	Goggle	
2006	The Gold Bracelet	Murderer	
2006	The Prestige	Ticket Hawker	
2006	Outta Sync	Poppy Poppenheimer (The DJ)	
2007	The Haunting of Marsten Manor	Hank	
2007	Boxboarders!	Zoltar	
2007	Underdog	Referee	
2007	Halloween	Graveyard Keeper	Uncredited
2008	Julia	George	
2008	Spy School	Mr. Bailey	
2008	Skeletons in the Desert	Bob Chamberlain	
2008	Mirrors	Terrence Berry	
2008	Trickery Mimicry	Passenger	
2009	Someone's Knocking at the Door	John Hopper	
2009	Tripping Forward	Casting Director #1	
2009	Scream of the Bikini	Cult Leader	
2010	New Terminal Hotel	Spitz	
2010	The Auctioneers	Dean	
2010	Darkening Sky	Guy	
2011	The Artist	Journalist	
2011	Breath of Hate	Hate	
2012	Bad Ass	Store Clerk	
2012	Any Day Now	Larry	
2012	Dust Up	Sheriff Nathan Haggler	
2012	Lost Lake	Vern	
2013	Dug Up	Devin Chase	
2014	Real Heroes	The Announcer	
2015	The Last House	Hate	
2016	Gone: VR 360	Mr. Avery	
2016	Trash Fire	Pastor Sterling	
2016	The Chair	Tudley	
2016	The Holy Man	Homeless Digger Otis	
2017	Mohawk	Hezekiah Holt	
2018	Nightmare Cinema	Janitor / Ron / Thing	
2019	2177: The San Francisco Love Hacker Crimes	Thornton	
2020	The Nowhere Inn	Limo Driver	
2020	The Estate	Mr. Amis	
2020	Bleach	Special Agent Musk	
2023	Brooklyn 45	Mjr. Paul DiFranco	
2023	Dark Harvest	The Farmer	
2025	Dorothea	Chief	

=== Television ===
Year	Title	Role	Notes
1998	Sabrina the Teenage Witch	Clerk #2	Episode: "Sabrina and the Beanstalk"
1998	The Jamie Foxx Show	Hotel Guest	Episode: "Jamie Returns"
1998	The Secret Diary of Desmond Pfeiffer	George Axelrod	Episode: "School Daze"
1998	Party of Five	Leon	Episode: "Tender Age"
1999	The Magnificent Seven	Banker	Episode: "Sins of the Past"
1999	Hyperion Bay	Mechanic	Episode: "Strange Days"
1999	The Norm Show	Mr. Grey	Episode: "Norm Dates a Client"
1999	G vs E	Bean	Episode: "Evilator"
2000	The Hughleys	Bean Pusher	Episode: "Two Jacks and a Beanstalk"
2000	Buffy the Vampire Slayer	Bartender	Episode: "Family"
2001	The Huntress	Haskell Beauville	Episode: "With Great Power"
2003	Karen Sisco	Desk Clerk	Episode: "Nostalgia"
2004	10-8: Officers on Duty	Freddy	Episode: "Love Don't Love Nobody"
2005	Strong Medicine	Bartender	Episode: "Paternity Test"
2006	Windfall	Man	Episode: "Running with the Devil"
2008	Weeds	Oritz	Episode: "Lady's a Charm"
2008	Leverage	Frank	Episode: "The Bank Shot Job"
2009	How I Met Your Mother	Highway Cop #1	Episode: "As Fast as She Can"
2009–2011	Poor Paul	Bradford	5 episodes
2010–2012	Justified	Harvey Jones / Roy the Bartender	4 episodes
2011	Melissa & Joey	Carl	Episode: "Mel and Joe's Anniversary"
2012	Criminal Minds	Louis Sills	Episode: "Heathridge Manor"
2012	Bones	Ephraim Babcock	Episode: "The Family in the Feud"
2013	American Horror Story	Sedated Patient	Episode: "The Name Game"
2013–2018	The Middle	Wayne	4 episodes
2014	Enlisted	Private Swaggle	Episode: "Pilot"
2014	Crossbones	Eisengrim	8 episodes
2016	Teen Wolf	Travers	Episode: "Amplification"
2017	Baskets	Chuck	Episode: "Reverie"
2017	Law & Order True Crime	DDA Elliott Alhadeff	2 episodes
2018	Counterpart	Rail Thin Man	Episode: "No Man's Land - Part Two"
2019	Doom Patrol	Dr. Bertrand	Episode: "Paw Patrol"
2020	Into the Dark	The Administrator	Episode: "The Current Occupant"
2021	Station 19	Jerry	Episode: "Learning to Fly"
