= Vernon Wells (actor) =

Australian actor

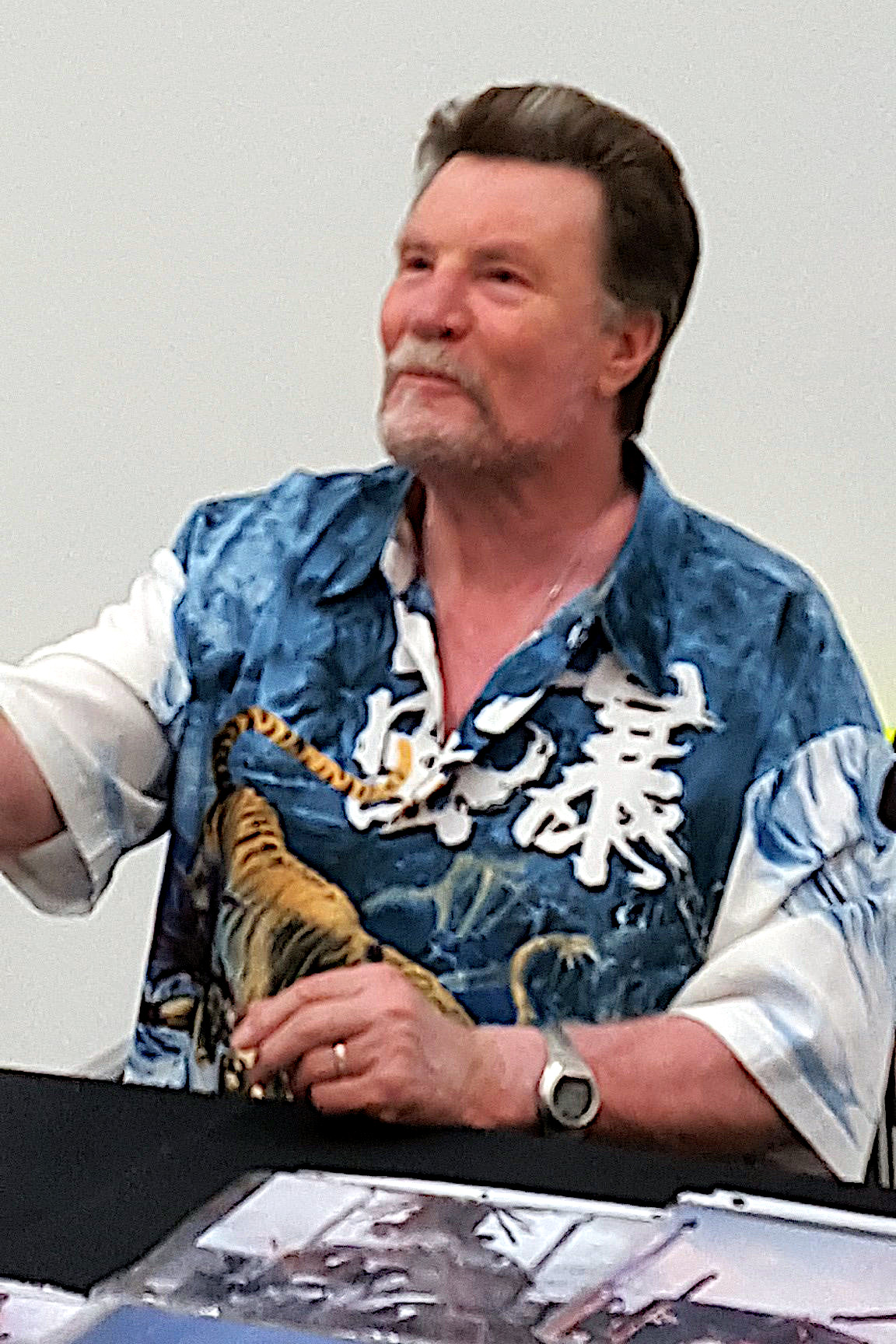
- Wells in 2015
- Born: 31 December 1945 (age 80); Rushworth, Victoria, Australia
- Occupation: Actor
- Years active: 1967–present
- Spouse(s): Kymberli Ann Weed (m. 1988–1991) Grace Kono-Wells

Vernon George Wells (born 31 December 1945) is an Australian character actor. He began appearing on Australian television shows in the mid-1970s, such as Homicide, Matlock Police and All the Rivers Run. He is best known to international audiences for his role of Wez in the 1981 science fiction action film Mad Max 2 and Bennett in the military action film Commando.

After Mad Max 2, Wells began appearing in Hollywood films, such as science fiction comedies Weird Science (1985) and Innerspace (1987). In the 2000s, Wells acted in the television series Power Rangers Time Force portraying the series' main villain Ransik. Since the 2010s and 2020s, he has been a staple in American action B-movies.

== Career ==
=== 1970s ===
Wells worked in a quarry, then as a salesman, and then in theatre and rock bands. In the 1970s, he was selected by casting agents to appear in a theatre play, and he started to appear in Australian TV commercials, print advertisements, local Australian TV shows such as Homicide and Matlock Police and historical TV mini-series like Against The Wind, Sara Dane and All The Rivers Run.

His first cinema appearance was a minor role in Felicity (1979), a low-budget, erotic fantasy film.

=== 1980s ===
Wells was cast as the homicidal biker Wez, in Mad Max 2 (1981), filmed around Silverton near Broken Hill in outback New South Wales, Australia. It is the role for which he is probably best known to international audiences, as Wells portrays a psychotic, post-apocalyptic henchman who relentlessly pursues hero Max Rockatansky (Mel Gibson), before meeting a spectacular death at the film's finale.

Hollywood beckoned for Wells, and he spoofed his mad biker role in the popular 1985 teen comedy Weird Science, written and directed by John Hughes and produced by Joel Silver. Wells so impressed Silver with his work in that film that he was immediately secured for the role of Bennett opposite Arnold Schwarzenegger in Commando (1985). When first approached for the role in Commando, Wells was in Australia working on the feature film, Fortress, based on the real-life Faraday School kidnapping, in a starring role opposite Rachel Ward. Wells appeared as Roo Marcus in Last Man Standing (1987). Wells played a role in the Knight Rider season 4 episode "Hills of Fire".

=== 1990s and 2000s ===
In 1992, Wells appeared in one of the few roles in which he is not cast as a villain, in the short-lived 1992 television comedy series The Amazing Live Sea Monkeys. The show was about a professor who accidentally enlarged three Sea-Monkeys to human-size, and then had to deal with their comical ineptness in the world. In 1993, Wells starred in the science fiction film Fortress with Christopher Lambert (no connection to the previous movie of the same name).

Many of Wells's roles 1990s and 2000s portrayed villains, as in the films Circuitry Man (1990), Kick of Death (1997), Starforce (2000) and Power Rangers Time Force (2001). In the Power Rangers episodes, he played the role of Ransik, a mutant crime lord from the year 3000 who travels back in time to take over the world. In 2002, he reprised this role for the Power Rangers Wild Force/Time Force two-part team-up episode "Reinforcements from the Future". Wells starred in the 2009 horror film Silent Night, Zombie Night. Wells also starred in an award-winning role in “Trouble Is My Business (2018)”.

Grace, his current wife, is Japanese, and in 2015, to commemorate the 30th anniversary of the Commando production, he sent a congratulatory message video to his Japanese fans, partly in Japanese.

Wells' film Censor Addiction was released on March 3, 2026 where he plays the character Wizard. He is also credited as a co-producer.

== Personal life ==
Wells lost his Pacific Palisades home, belongings and memorabilia in the Palisades Fire in January 2025.

== Selected filmography ==
- Mad Max 2 (1981) as Wez
- Weird Science (1985) as Lord General
- Commando (1985) as Bennett
- Fortress (1985) as Dabby Duck
- MacGyver (1985) as Catlin
- Coming of Age (1986) as Chuck Proby (Donald)
- Hunter (1986) as Sonny Zajak
- Innerspace (1987) as Mr. Igoe
- Last Man Standing (1987) as Roo Marcus
- P.I. Private Investigations (1987) as Detective North
- Sunset (1988) as Houseman
- MacGyver (1988) as Paul Donnay
- Nam Angels (1989) as Chard
- American Eagle (1989) as Johnny Burke
- Enemy Unssen (1989) as Steiger
- Undeclared War (1990) as Hannibal (Sheng zhan feng yun)
- Circuitry Man (1990) as Plughead
- The Shrimp on the Barbie (1990) as Bruce
- Fortress (1992) as Maddox
- Ultimatum (1994) as Gerard Richter
- Plughead Rewired: Circuitry Man II (1994) as Plughead
- Manosaurus (1994) as Professor Sorenson
- Space Truckers (1996) as Mr. Cutt
- Vulcan (1997) as Greg Mitchum
- Billy Frankenstein (1998) as Otto von Sloane
- Power Rangers Time Force (2001, TV Series) as Ransik
- Power Rangers Wild Force (2002, TV Series) as Ransik
- Beneath Loch Ness (2001) as Constable
- Curse of the Forty-Niner (2003) as Jeremiah Stone
- Looney Tunes: Back in Action (2003) as Acme VP, Child Labor
- Devil's Knight (2003) as Frank
- King of the Ants (2003) as Beckett
- Chastity (2005) as Trucker
- The Strange Case of Dr. Jekyll and Mr. Hyde (2006) as Dr. Dennis Lanyon
- Tru Loved (2007) as Coach Wesley
- Green Street 2: Stand Your Ground (2009) as Tankersley Governor
- The Drawn Together Movie: The Movie (2010) as Scott the Network Head
- Silent Night, Zombie Night (2011) as Paul Irwin
- Jurassic Attack (2013) as Agent Grimaldi
- Throwback (2014) as Detective McNab
- Jurassic City (2015) as Agent LaFranco
- Relentless Justice (2015) as Mayor Jason Macendale
- Timber the Treasure Dog (2016) as Wolf (Voice)
- The Perfect Weapon (2016) as The Interrogator
- Death House (2017) as Nela
- Landfall (2017) as Wexler
- Der Vertrag (2017) as Cooper Ryan (Television film)
- Trouble Is My Business (2018) as Detective Barry Tate
- Lilith (2018) as Phillip
- Loss Prevention (2018) as CEO Reginald Bachman
- Glass Jaw (2018) as Happy
- The City of Gold (2018) as The Inquisitor
- Impact Event (2018) as Ed
- Crossbreed (2019) as Murphy
- The Silent Natural (2019) as Sarah's Father
- Eason's Gold (2019) as Eason
- Slayer: The Repentless Killogy (2019) as Prison Guard #1
- Zombies V the C.W.A. (2019) as Narrator (Short)
- Emerald Run (2020) as Dodson
- No Chance (2020) as Barrett Transformed
- Debt Collectors (2020) as Cyrus Skinner
- Kill Giggles (2020) as Malcolm Fossor (Giggles)
- Await the Dawn (2020) as Zed
- Maverick N Grundy (2020) as Wesley
- Camp Twilight (2020) as Detective Bennett
- Charlie's Christmas Wish (2020) as Hank Wentworth
- Starspawn: Overture (2020) as Randolph Sutton (Short)
- Social Distance (2020) as Gil Oldman Jr.
- Red Snow (2021) as Julius King
- Frost (2021) as Grant
- Christmas Collision (2021) as Ronan
- The Price We Pay (2022) as The Doctor
- Forbearance (2022) as Dr. George Ross
- A Bachelor's Valentine (2022) as Stuart Knapp
- Sally Floss: Digital Detective (2022) as Papa
- Ghost (2023) as Jeremiah
- The Green Oak Guardian (2023) as Lemmy LaRoux
- Apex Predators 2: The Spawning (2024) as Bartender Wells
- Censor Addiction (2026) as Wizard
- Days of Sodom: A Crow Fan Film as Mayor "Mino"

=== Video games ===
- Ty the Tasmanian Tiger 3: Night of the Quinkan (2005) Ridge
- Darksiders (2010) Samael
- Darksiders II (2012) Samael
- Deus Ex: Mankind Divided (2016) Jim Miller
- Darksiders Genesis (2019) as Samael

== Awards and nominations ==
Year	Award	Category	Nominated work	Result
2014	The Scare-A-Con Film Festival	Best Supporting Actor	Throwback	Won
2020	NYC Indie Film Awards	Best Actor	7th Revelation	Won
2020	Rome Prisma Independent Film Awards	Best Supporting Actor	Frost	Won
2020	Sydney Science Fiction Film Festival	BEST ACTOR (Short Film)	Starspawn: Overture	Won
2021	Film Invasion L.A.	Best Actor in a Lead Role	Kringle Time	Won
