= Humanimal (film) =

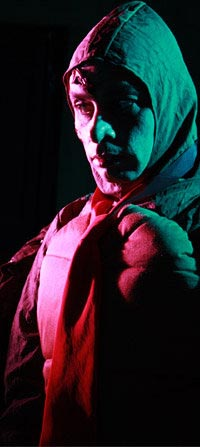
- Directed by: Francesc Morales
- Written by: Francesc Morales; Ximena Quiroz
- Produced by: Francesc Morales
- Starring: Ramón Llao; Jenny Cavallo; Sebastián Layseca
- Cinematography: Claudia Serrano
- Music by: René Rocco
- Production company: Efecto Moral
- Distributed by: Jorge Olguin
- Release date: 2009
- Running time: 82 minutes
- Country: Chile
- Language: No dialog

Humanimal is a 2009 Chilean film by Francesc Morales. The film is a fantasy horror film set on a world where animals have taken over humans. It depicts the story of how an innocent Turtle becomes corrupt, as he is exposed to sex and violence. The cast includes recognized Chilean actors such as Ramón Llao, Jenny Cavallo and Sebastián Layseca. Because most characters are animals, the film has absolutely no dialog, so it is considered one of the few modern silent films.

== Synopsis ==
The clumsy Turtle is a victim of the smart Fox. When Cat appears, they compete to seduce her. Cat is only interested in the one that incorporates human habits. Turtle realizes he can gain some advantage by feeding a strange creature with animal meat.

== Cast ==
- Ramón Llao as Turtle
- Jenny Cavallo as Cat
- Sebastián Layseca as Fox
- Cecilia Levi as Bunny
- Francisco Gormaz as Lion
- Felipe Avello as Tiger
- Cristobal Tapia-Montt as Young Man
- Antonia Cárcamo as Girl
- Jimena Nuñez as Woman
- Martín Morales as Sheep-Boy
- Marcelo Nuñez as Sheep-Boy 2
- Tomás Llagostera as Sheep-Boy 3
- Flavio Cárcamo as Father
- Sebastián Badilla as Gym Instructor
