= Silent Night, Zombie Night =

- Directed by: Sean Cain
- Written by: Sean Cain
- Produced by: Sean Cain; Wes Laurie
- Starring: Frank Forcinito; Andy Hopper; Nadine Stenovitch; Vernon Wells; Felissa Rose; Lew Temple
- Cinematography: Jim Wright
- Music by: Mario Salvucci
- Distributed by: Pacific Entertainment Corporation; Genius Brands
- Release date: November 1, 2009 (Gorezone's Weekend of Horrors)
- Running time: 85 minutes
- Country: United States
- Language: English

Silent Night, Zombie Night is a 2009 horror film written and directed by Sean Cain and starring Frank Forcinito, Andy Hopper, Nadine Stenovitch, Vernon Wells, Felissa Rose, and Lew Temple.

== Plot ==
A week before Christmas, a viral outbreak turns the citizens of Los Angeles into the walking dead. On the brink of severing ties with both his wife and his longtime partner Nash, L.A.P.D. officer Frank Talbot instead winds up trapped with them as death closes in.

== Cast ==
- Frank Forcinito as Frank Talbot
- Andy Hopper as Nash Jackson
- Nadine Stenovitch as Sarah Talbot
- Lew Temple as Jeffrey Hannigan
- Vernon Wells as Paul Irwin
- Felissa Rose as Elsa Lansing
- Chad Meisenheimer as Car Bumping Zombie

== Production ==
Shooting was momentarily halted when the Los Angeles Police Department arrived by foot, car, and helicopter due to a concerned citizen mistaking actors with prop weapons for gang members battling in the streets. Lead zombie Timothy Muskatell was run over by a car while heading to set on his scooter resulting in a dislocated shoulder. This resulted in having director, Sean Cain having to substitute for him for two shooting days.

=== Poster ===
The film poster is peculiar in that it depicts, left to right, lead actors Andy Hopper, Nadine Stenovitch, and Frank Forcinito, who portray the film's three main characters, while at the same time highlighting the names of actors who play secondary roles but are better known: Vernon Wells for his roles in Mad Max 2 and Commando, Felissa Rose for the horror Sleepaway Camp, and Lew Temple for his time on The Walking Dead.

== Release ==
The film had its premiere during the Gorezone Weekend of Horrors on November 1, 2009 where it played alongside another Cain produced film, Someone's Knocking at the Door. Since then Silent Night, Zombie Night has played in a number of festivals up until its release on DVD & Blu-ray October 4, 2011. It has since gone on to be a holiday horror favorite popping up numerous lists in 2011 like HorrorNews.net's 'Top 20 Christmas Movies', 365 Horror Movie's 'Best Christmas Horror list' and Most Wanted Monster's '13 Christmas Horror Films to DIE for'.
