= Lew Temple =

American actor (born 1967)

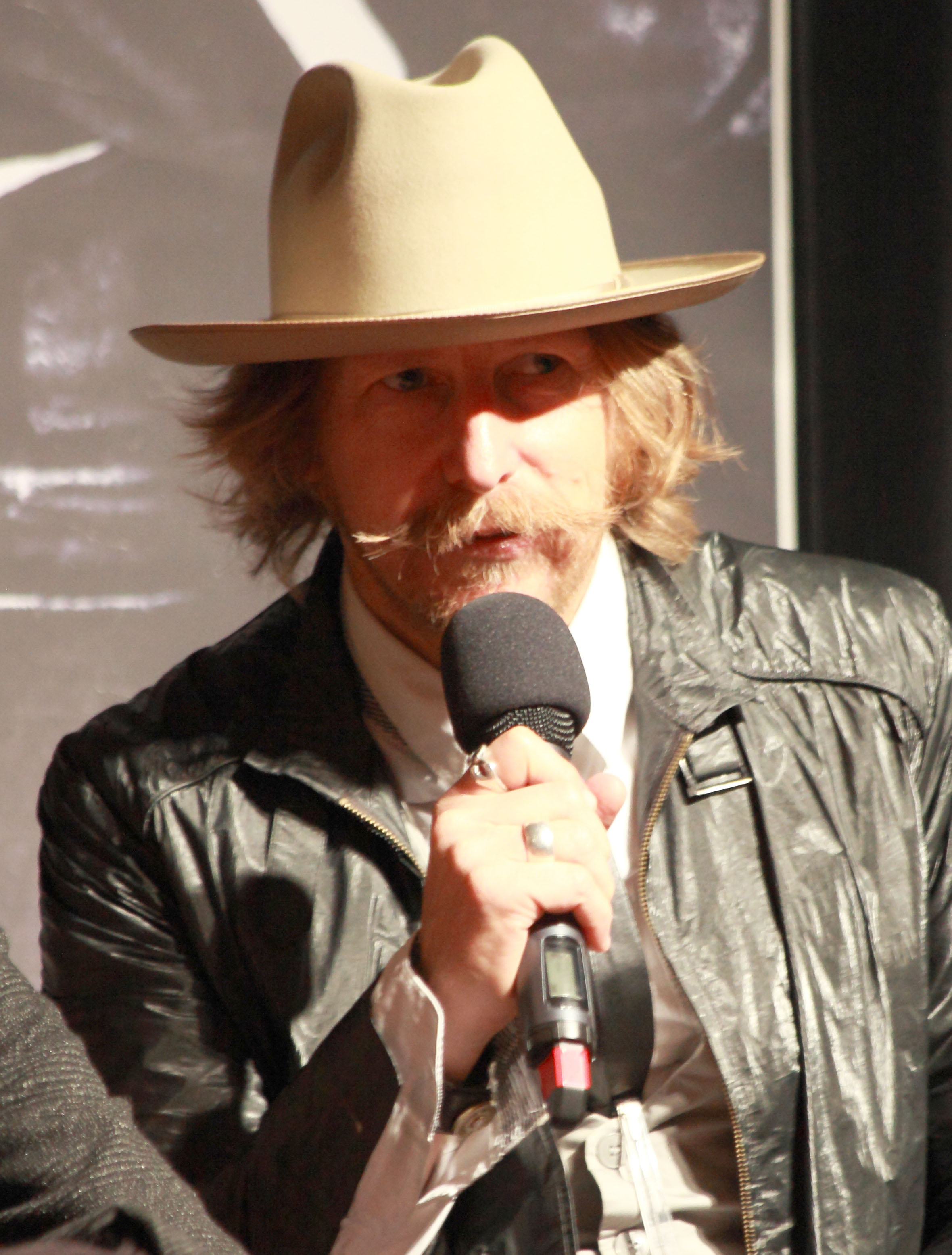
- Temple at Spooky Empire's Ultimate Horror Weekend 2014 in Orlando, Florida
- Born: October 2, 1967 (age 58); Louisiana, U.S.
- Occupation: Actor
- Years active: 1993–present

Lew Temple (born October 2, 1967) is an American actor known for roles in Domino and Waitress, and for playing Axel in the third season of The Walking Dead.

== Early life ==
Temple was raised in Texas. He was the 1982 Baseball MVP at Rollins College, and graduated in 1985.

== Career ==
=== Baseball ===
Though he was not good enough for the big leagues, he continued with his love for baseball, snagging roles as a minor league bullpen catcher for the Seattle Mariners and Houston Astros. In 1986, he was a scout for the New York Mets, and would later go on to serve as assistant director of Minor League Operations and Scouting for the Astros until 1993.

=== Acting ===
==== Film ====
Temple has had several film roles in the horror genre, appearing in Rob Zombie's horror film, The Devils Rejects as Adam Banjo, portraying Sheriff Winston in the prequel to the remake of The Texas Chain Saw Massacre and as Noel Kluggs in Rob Zombie's slasher film, Halloween. Temple played Marv in Trailer Park of Terror, and Pete in the thriller/horror film House. In 2016, he starred in Rob Zombie's slasher film 31 as Psycho-Head.

Temple's other film roles include Locus Fender in the action film Domino, a paramedic in the crime thriller Déjà Vu, Cal, the diner manager in the comedy-drama Waitress, Brian LaRue in a proof of concept for the science-fiction film The Three, Ned in the thriller Unstoppable and Montgomery Blair, a member of Abraham Lincoln's Cabinet, in the film Saving Lincoln, which tells the President's story through the eyes of Ward Hill Lamon, a former law partner, friend, and primary bodyguard.

==== Television ====
Temple appeared in an episode of CSI: Miami as Billy Chadwick, a local loner in a grizzly bear murder case. In 2010, he appeared in an episode of NCIS: Los Angeles as Mr. Loobertz, and in 2011 he appeared in an episode of Criminal Minds, in which he played a former fisherman turned part-time deliveryman called Bill Thomas, who kidnaps Alison Sparks.

His most notable television role was on The Walking Dead as Axel, a prisoner survivor of the zombie apocalypse.

==== Awards ====
In 2015, Temple received a Lifetime Achievement Award from the Annual Gulf Coast Film and Video Festival. The award is given to a distinguished actor recognized for his continuing work in the industry of film and video.

== Personal life ==
In 2002, Temple was let go from a film contract because he dismissed symptoms of a serious illness. A near-death experience resulted in an examination at M.D. Anderson Hospital in Houston, where he was diagnosed with a rare form of leukemia and a forty percent chance of survival. He stayed in hospital for eight months and successfully underwent chemotherapy treatment.

In 2009, Temple was involved in a charity event for breast cancer called Bowling for Boobies.

== Filmography ==
=== Film ===
Year	Title	Role	Notes
1994	Angels in the Outfield	Baseball Player	
1994	Jason's Lyric	Man on Bus	
1995	The Kangaroo	Crazy Man	
1997	The Stalk Exchange	Rick Sharpe	
1998	The Newton Boys	Waiter	
1999	A Slipping-Down Life	Audience Member #2	
2000	Born to Win	Raymond	
2000	Red Ink	Martin Mueller	
2001	On the Borderline	Web	
2003	Rolling Kansas	Bill	
2003	Parasite Dolls	Caine	Voice, English dub
2003	21 Grams	County Sheriff	
2005	The Devil's Rejects	Adam Banjo	
2005	Domino	Locus Fender	
2006	Come Early Morning	Man	Voice
2006	The Visitation	Deputy Tommy Smalls	
2006	Heavens Fall	Wade Wright	
2006	The Guitar Player's Girlfriend	Gary	Short film
2006	The Texas Chainsaw Massacre: The Beginning	Sheriff Hoyt	
2006	Deja Vu	Paramedic	
2007	Waitress	Cal	
2007	Halloween	Noel Kluggs	
2008	Trailer Park of Terror	Marv	
2008	House	Pete	
2008	No Man's Land: The Rise of Reeker	Hitchhiker	
2008	The Beneficiary	Gun Dealer	Short film
2009	Someone's Knocking at the Door	Coroner Tom Collins	
2009	Otis E.	The Cashier	
2009	Silent Night, Zombie Night	Jeffrey Hannigan	
2009	Happy in the Valley	Chris	
2010	The Killing Jar	Lonnie	
2010	A Gang Land Love Story	Ivan	
2010	Unstoppable	Ned Oldham	
2011	Montana Amazon	Trevor	
2011	Rango	Furgus/Hitch	Voice
2011	Asparagus	Counselor #2	Short film
2011	Zombex	Aldous Huxtable	
2011	We Are Family	Norm	
2012	MoniKa	Lloyd	
2012	The Preacher's Daughter	The Garden	
2012	Saving Lincoln	Montgomery Blair	
2012	The Unlikely's	Ray Ray	
2012	Lawless	Abshire	
2013	The Lone Ranger	Hollis	
2013	Night Moves	Wandering Camper	
2014	Wicked Blood	Donny Baker	Direct-to-video
2014	Atlas Shrugged Part III: Who Is John Galt?	Ellis Wyatt	
2015	Desierto	Border Patrol officer	Mexican film
2016	31	Psycho-Head	
2017	The Endless	Tim	
2017	Feral	Bill Talbot	
2017	Kidnap	Terrence "Terry" Vicky	
2019	Once Upon a Time in Hollywood	Land Pirate Lew	
2019	Between the Darkness	Roy Grady	
2020	Laura Hasn't Slept	Dr. Parsons; The Monstrosity	Short film
2021	Spirit Untamed	Wrangler/Conductor	Voice
2022	Monstrous	Mr. Alonzo	
2022	The Castle	Walter Brown	
2022	Corsicana	Jack Donner	
2024	Seven Cemeteries	Tommy Lasorda	
2025	Ed Kemper	Ed Kemper	
2025	Dorothea	Billy 'Hurricane' Hodges	Film about serial killer Dorothea Puente

=== Television ===
Year	Title	Role	Notes
1993	Dragon Half	Ticket Man	Voice, video short
1994	Saiyûki	Monk/Village Chief	Voice, television film
1994	Dirty Pair Flash: Mission 3 Act 1	Additional Voices	Video short
1995	Golden Boy	Animator E	Voice, video
1995	A Woman of Independent Means	Mover	Miniseries
1996	Elf o karu mono-tachi	Various	Voice
1996	Burn up W	Ashuhara	Voice, video
1996	Walker, Texas Ranger	Whit Ganz	Episode: "Miracle at Middle Creek"
1996–1997	Martian Successor Nadesico	Additional Voices	10 episodes
1997	Walker, Texas Ranger	Nick Devlin	Episode: "Full Contact"
1997	Kimera	Guard	Voice, video
1997	The Big Easy	Nash Lee	Episode: "A Streetcar with Desire"
1998	Bubblegum Crisis: Tokyo 2040	Musician #2	2 episodes
1998	Walker, Texas Ranger	Louie	Episode: "On the Border"
1998	Slayers OVA 1	Bandit/Additional Voices	Video
1998	Generator Gawl	Various	Unknown episodes
1998	Dirty Pair: Mission II, Act I	Goat Abiko/Additional Voices	Video
1998	Go Nagai's New Cutey Honey	Moto-Mutant 2/Additional Voices	Video
1998	Gasaraki	Additional Voices	3 episodes
1999	Bubblegum Crisis Tokyo 2040: Shadow War	Kusui / Musician 2	Video
2000	Sin: The Movie	Various	Voice, video
2001	Walker, Texas Ranger	Ollie Olmedo	Episode: "Saturday Night"
2007	CSI: Miami	Billy Chadwick	Episode: "A Grizzly Murder"
2009	Esperanza Beach	Watson	Video short
2009	How to Study Your Bible for Kids	Commissioner Context	Video short
2010	NCIS: Los Angeles	Mr. Loobertz	Episode: "Full Throttle"
2011	Criminal Minds	Bill Thomas	Episode: "Coda"
2011	Cross	Detective Red	Video
2012	Hawaii Five-0	Stuart Rizzi	Episode: "Kahu"
2012–2013	The Walking Dead	Axel	Season 3 (Recurring role; 8 episodes)
2013	Justified	Grady	1 episode
2015	Review	Shovel Hitter	Episode: "Buried Alive, 6 Star Review, Public Speaking"
2015	Longmire	Archer Loftus	3 episodes
2015	Wicked City	Dave Keller	3 episodes
2017	Chicago Fire	Max Schlottman	Season 5 Episode 17
2025	Super Duper Bunny League	Cactus Outlaw #2	Voice, episode: "Long Tall Sally"

=== Video games ===
Year	Title	Role	Notes
2006	Full Spectrum Warrior: Ten Hammers	Additional voices	
2011	Killzone 3	ISA Soldiers	
2011	Rango	Turley	
2016	Mafia III	Additional voices	
