= PollyGrind Film Festival =

Annual film festival held in Las Vegas, USA

- Location: Las Vegas, Nevada, United States
- Founded: 2010
- Language: English
- Website: pollygrind.com

The PollyGrind Film Festival, also known as simply Pollygrind and the PollyGrind Underground Film Festival, was an annual event held in Las Vegas, Nevada that specialized "in all things alternative, with a wide variety of films not shown elsewhere." Spotlighting short films, feature-length films, music videos and trailers of all genres, PollyGrind was founded by filmmaker and promoter Chad Clinton Freeman. The event prided itself on focusing on individuality, diversity, creativity and empowerment. Vegas Seven has said PollyGrind is a "celebration of all things, dark, bloody, underground and arthouse."

== History ==
The event gave a slew of awards that are quite different than most festivals. Those include The Biggest Baddest Mother of the PollyGrind, Best Use of Nudity/Sexuality, Best Use of Violence/Gore, Most Outrageous, and Most Creative. There is also a Bad Girl Award and an Ultimate Badass Award.

Started in 2010, PollyGrind's first year was a five-night event "with over a dozen features, plus tons of short films, trailers and music videos; the quality ranged from borderline incompetent to undiscovered genius, virtually all within the confines of horror and sci-fi." Arrowinthehead.com declared the event a "B-movie jamboree of awesomeness" that "only Vegas has the balls to host."

The second installment of the festival included more than 100 films over a span of 10 days. Programming ranged from campy horror B-movies to extreme, underground and avant-garde films and according to Robin Leach featured "every night creature from hookers to zombies."

DreadCentral.com noted that "PollyGrind has quickly made a name for itself as one of the up-and-coming premiere genre fests out there due to the success of each year of programming." Filmmaker Adam Rehmeier, whose film The Bunny Game was banned by the British Board of Film Classification right after playing the event, called the festival a display of cinema's "bastards and red-headed step children."

MovieMaker magazine named PollyGrind to its 2014 list of "50 festivals worth the entry fee" and its 2012 list of "25 festivals worth the entry fee." The festival was also named to MovieMaker's 2013 "Top 5 Coolest Experimental/Underground Film Festivals."

As of 2013, PollyGrind is a member of Film Exchange, a multi-market screening network composed of regional U.S. and International film festivals. Select winners at PollyGrind advance to screen at the RxSM Self-Medicated Film Expo (RxSM), which takes place in Austin, Texas each year alongside South by Southwest.

Starting in 2014, feature film official selections at the festival will also be looked at for distribution through its new label PollyGrind Presents, while short films will be considered for special features and compilation releases through a number of outlets.

In regards to successes of the festival, filmmaker Eric Stanze noted in his 2014 Fearnet column that Jen Soska and Sylvia Soska of American Mary fame and Calvin Reeder of The Rambler and V/H/S received "major boosts in their careers when their early works won key awards at the fest." He also noted "Randy Moore's 2013 Sundance Official Selection Escape from Tomorrow was first an Official Selection of PollyGrind in 2012."

2014 marked the final year of the festival. While it may be resurrected in the future, as of summer 2015, it was no longer in operation.

== Award winners ==
THE BIG THREE

- Biggest Baddest Mother of the PollyGrind (Grand Jury Prize) – The Interrogation of Cheryl Cooper, directed by Albert Pyun

(First Runner Up) Best Dark Comedy Chocolate Strawberry Vanilla dir. by Stuart Simpson

(Second Runner Up) Best Documentary Rebel Scum dir. by Video Rahim

AUDIENCE CHOICE

- Favorite Film – Heidi dir. by Daniel Ray

(First Runner Up) Chocolate Strawberry Vanilla dir. by Stuart Simpson

(Second Runner Up) Rebel Scum dir. by Video Rahim

BEST OF THE REST

- Best Action Film – Teddy Bomb dir. by Justin Decloux
- Best Arthouse Film – Memory Lane dir. by Shawn Holmes
- Best Crime Film – The Black Tape dir. by Ramone Menon
- Best Thriller – The Badger Game dir. by Joshua Wagner and Thomas Zambeck
- Best Horror Film – Charlie's Farm dir. by Christopher Sun
- Best Fantasy Film – Army of Frankensteins dir. by Ryan Bellgardt
- Best Foreign Language Film – Tombville dir. by Nikolas ListBest of Zombiepalooza

FPS - First Person Shooter dir. by Andreas Luetzelschwab

- Best Super Hero Film – Um Conto De Batman: Na Psicose Do Ventríloquo dir. by Elvis DelBagno
- Best Drama – See You Next Tuesday dir. by Drew Tobia
- Best Nevada Film – Heidi dir. by Daniel Ray

DIRECTING

- Best Director – Albert Pyun, The Interrogation of Cheryl Cooper
- Best Woman Director – Erin Davies, Fagbug Nation
- Director on the Rise – Stuart Simpson, Chocolate Strawberry Vanilla

ACTING

- Best Overall Individual Performance – Glenn Maynard, Chocolate Strawberry Vanilla
- Best Overall Cast – Charlie's Farm: Tara Reid, Nathan Jones, Bill Moseley, Kane Hodder, Allira Jaques, Genna Chanelle Hayes, Dean Kirkright, Madeleine Kennedy, David Beamish, Cameron Caulfield, Darrell Plumridge, Sam Coward, Lindsay Edgecomb, Brad Bromfield, Robert J. Mussett, Justin Gerardin, Trudi Ross, Colin Dixon, Mark E Darin, and Brad Avcin
- Best Actor – Shane Ryan, The Interrogation of Cheryl Cooper
- Best Actress – Tommie Vegas, The Interrogation of Cheryl Cooper
- Best Supporting Actor – Tomer Shechori, Scrambled
- Best Supporting Actress – Jillian Leigh, The Badger Game
- Supporting Actress - Newcomer Award – Brittany Bochart, The Interrogation of Cheryl Cooper
- Actress on the Rise – Joei Fulco, Heidi
- Best Cameo Appearance – Kane Hodder, Charlie's Farm

BEST OF CATEGORIES

- Best Screenplay – Cynthia Curnan, The Interrogation of Cheryl Cooper
- Best Cinematography –Michael Su, The Interrogation of Cheryl Cooper
- Best Visual Effects – Charlie's Farm
- Best Song – Rebel Scum
- Best Film Score – Tony Riparetti, The Interrogation of Cheryl Cooper
- Best Editing – Daniel Ray, Heidi
- Best Sound Design – Tony Riparetti, The Interrogation of Cheryl Cooper
- Best Production Design – Michael Tushaus and Kelly Schwarze, The Interrogation of Cheryl Cooper
- Best Makeup – Amanda Martinez, The Interrogation of Cheryl Cooper
- Best Poster – Chocolate Strawberry Vanilla
- Best Key Art – Glenn Cochrane, The Interrogation of Cheryl Cooper

BEST USE OF

- Best Use of Nudity/Sexuality – Chocolate Strawberry Vanilla
- Best Use of Violence/Gore – Chocolate Strawberry Vanilla
- Best Use of Music – The Beauty Strip
- Most Outrageous – Rebel Scum
- Most Creative – Memory Lane
- Most Heart – Chocolate Strawberry Vanilla
- Most Thought-Provoking Film – Love Child
- Most Cool – The Badger Game

SPECIAL POLLYGRIND AWARDS

- Bad Girl Award – Tara Reid, Charlie's Farm
- Ultimate Badass Award – Nathan Jones, Charlie's Farm
- It Came From the 90s Award – Hi-8: Horror Independent 8
- Best Title Award – Lust of the Vampire Girls
- Best Use of Inanimate Objects – Teddy Bomb

Heidi

- The Willy B – Heidi

LIFETIME ACHIEVEMENT AWARDS

- Filmmaker of a Different Breed – Ted V. Mikels

Glen Coburn

- Distributor of a Different Breed – Wild Eye Releasing
- Advocate of a Different Breed – theatre7

Weng's Chop

- Hype Man of a Different Breed – Flavor Flav

2014 POLLYGRIND ROYALTY

- Queen – Tommie Vegas
- King – Doug Farra
- Prince – David Rosen
- Princess – Joei Fulco

MEDIUM FILMS, SHORTS, TRAILERS AND PROMOS

- Best Medium Film – The Beauty Strip dir. by G. Correli
- Best Transgression Medium Film – The Sex Doll She-Bitch dir. by Jaison H. Costley
- Best Short – Cassandra dir. by Guy-Roger Duvert
- Best Shortest Short (Under 5 Minutes) – The Small Stuff dir. by Andrea Capere
- Best Foreign Language Short – O Corpo dir. by Rodrigo Lopes de Barros
- Best Horror Short – The Last Halloween dir. by Marc Roussel
- Best Drama Short – (tie) Forgive Me dir by. Nicholas Lamoreux

(tie) Go North dir. by Vanita Shastry

- Best Experimental Short – The Return dir. by Ada Athorp and Adrian Frost
- Best Dark Comedy Short – Cask of Amontillado dir. by Jeff Freeman
- Best Fantasy Short – Freak dir. by Joshua Cockfield
- Best Crime Short – Penance dir. Joe Lujan
- Best Animated Short – Theres an Octopus in Your Head dir. by Ari Grabb
- Best of Zombiepalooza – Naked Zombie Girl dir. Rickey Bird Jr.
- Best Science Fiction Short – Quintipus dir. by Victoria Angell
- Best Arthouse Short – Nayan and the Evil Eye dir. by Shaleen Sangha
- Best Exploitation Short – 32 dir. by Daren McCoy
- Best Transgression Short – No Pets Allowed dir. Nadine L'Esperance
- Best Thriller Short – Black Mask dir. by Alex Colonna
- Best Action Short – Aakra-Man dir. by Mihir Desai
- Best Film Noir Short – Pity dir. John Pata
- Best Timed Competition Film Project – Never Have I Ever dir. by Jonathan Robbins
- Best Nevada Short – The Gradations of Purgatory dir. by Douglas Farra
- Best Super Hero Short – Supergirl: Strange in A Strange Land dir. by Walter Jones
- Best of World of Death – (tie) Manscapping dir. by Mike Lenzini

(tie) Milk dir. James Chappell & Patrick Irving

- Best Documentary Short – Alternative Model dir. by Brian Lally
- Best Actor – Stephen Manley, Black Mask / The Gradations of Purgatory
- Best Actress – Sheetal Sheth, Go North
- Best Supporting Actor – William Grefe, Cask of Amontillado
- Best Supporting Actress – Hannah Waterbury, 32
- Best Director – Marc Roussel, The Last Halloween
- Best Woman Director – Vanita Shastry, Go North
- Best Director Under 21 – Nicholas Lamoreux, Forgive Me
- Best Screenplay – Daren McCoy, 32
- Best Music Video – If Only Tonight I Could Sleep by David Rosen dir. by Douglas Farra
- Best International Music Video – Violence Done Well dir. by Maida Hals
- Best Music Video Song – Shoot 4 The Sky by Doms Gauge
- Best Experimental Music Video – Gimme the Sweet and Lowdown dir. by Vira Ishchuk and Olga Ishchuk
- Music Video Honorable Mentions – Pretty In The Dark dir. by Herman Wang

Artful Dodger dir. by Felipe P. Soares

- Best Fake Trailer – Poultrygeist dir. by Lisa Jay
- Best Real Trailer – Atelophobia dir. by Joe Lujan
- Best Promo – Art Free World dir. by Sarah Lew
- Best Television Episode or Webisode – Bad Guys, Episode 2: 9:47AM dir. by Vincent McLean
- Best Television or Web Series – The Haunted World of Claire Wilmenson dir. by Dustin Austen, Emmy Johnson, Nicole Duff, and Savannah Salmons

SCREENPLAY COMPETITION

- Best Screenplay – Cop's Wife by Deirdre Patterson
- Best Screenplay Short – The Terrorist by Charlotte Lyons
- Best Television or Webseries Screenplay – Super Brains by Joseph Hedley Wilson and Ted Janet

|}

2013
- Biggest Baddest Mother of the PollyGrind — Desolate (Rob Grant)
- Best Nontraditional Film Experience — JONAS (Adam Rehmeier)
- Best Drama — Boys Cry (Mitchel A. Jones)
- Audience's Favorite Feature — Truth or Dare (Jessica Cameron)
- Best Horror Film (tie) — Nightmare Box (Jon Keeyes) and The Cemetery (Adam Ahlbrandt)
- Best Horror Short Film — Bruised (Jennifer Campbell)
- Best Found Footage Film — To Jennifer ( James Cullen Bressack)
- Best Arthouse Film — A Measure of the Sin (Jeff Wedding)
- Best Exploitation Film — The Minstrel Killer ( Michael Fredianelli)
- Best Retrosploitation Film — Legend of the Hillbilly Butcher (Joaquin Montalvan)
- Best Crime Film — Sweet Leaf (Julian Grant)
- Best Thriller — I Am Death (Paul Orehovec)
- Best Action Film — Eye of the Bennu (Paul Madariaga)
- Best Fantasy Film — Savage Witches (Clara Pais and Daniel Fawcett)
- Best Dark Comedy — Little Fucker (Mike Musical)
- Best Foreign Language Film — Benny Loves Killing (Ben Woodiwiss)
- Best of Zombiepalooza — Slaughterhouse Bride ( Zoë Rae and Luke McEwan)
- Best Experimental Film — The Synthetic Man (John R. Hand)
- Best Animated Film — Darkest Days (Danny Field)
- Best Transgression Film — Coyote (Trevor Juenger)
- Best Dramedy — What I Love About Concrete (Alanna Stewart and Katherine Dohan)
- Best Documentary — Sacrifice: In the Name of Goddess Gadhimai (Chandan Gupta)
- Best Nevada Film, Dark Comedy — Tricks (Med Jast)
- Best Nevada Film, Horror — Beast: A Monster Among Men (Mike Lenzini)
- Best Nevada Short — The Window (Alex Colonna)
- Best Director — Rob Grant (Desolate)
- Best Woman Director — Jessica Cameron (Truth or Dare)
- Best Short Film Director — Jennifer Campbell (Bruised)
- Director on the Rise — James Cullen Bressack (To Jennifer)
- Director Showcase Award — Adam Ahlbrandt (Buried in Flesh: The Cemetery / Cross Bearer)
- Best Overall Individual Performance — Johanna Stanton (Nightmare Box)
- Best Overall Cast — Brandon Galatz, Sean Patrick Leonard, Zane Byrdy, Alexis Martino and Graham Jenkins (Sweet Leaf)
- Best Actor — Bill Oberst Jr. (Coyote)
- Best Actress — Theresa Holly (Legend of the Hillbilly Butcher)
- Best Supporting Actor — Boakai Kimba (Boys Cry)
- Best Supporting Actress — Debbie Rochon (Dry Bones)
- Best Cameo Appearance — Ron Jason (Legend of the Hillbilly Butcher)
- Best Screenplay — Faceless (Jack "Saint" Hunter)
- Best Cinematography — Nightmare Box (Lorenzo Levrini)
- Best Visual Effects — Little Fucker
- Best Song — Cheeseballs
- Best Film Score — House of Forbidden Secrets
- Best Editing — JONAS (Adam Rehmeier)
- Best Sound Design — Eye of Bennu
- Best Poster — Nightmare Box
- Best Use of Nudity/Sexuality — Diet of Sex
- Best Use of Violence/Gore — The Cemetery
- Best Use of Music — What I Love About Concrete
- Most Innovative — To Jennifer
- Most Outrageous — Legend of the Hillbilly Butcher
- Most Creative — Desolate
- Most Heart — I Am Death
- Most Thought-Provoking Film — A Measure of the Sin
- Most Cool — Sweet Leaf
- Most Horrifying — Sacrifice: In the Name of Goddess Gadhimai
- Breakthrough Role, Actor — Jez Bonham (Desolate)
- Breakthrough Role, Actress — Katie Groshong (A Measure of the Sin)
- Newcomer Award — Natalie Jean (Buried In Flesh: The Cemetery / Cross Bearer)
- Super Thug Award — Sean Patrick Leonard (Sweet Leaf)
- Love to Hate Award — Blake Farris (Beast: A Monster Among Men)
- Bad Girl Award — Pauline Cousty (Benny Loves Killing)
- Ultimate Badass Award — Lew Temple (House of Forbidden Secrets)
- Filmmaker of a Different Breed — Todd Sheets
- Actress of a Different Breed — Dyanne Thorne
- Queen of PollyGrind — Jessica Cameron
- King of PollyGrind — Graham Jenkins
- Prince of PollyGrind — Elijah Kondeh
- Princess of PollyGrind — Corey Taylor
- Best Television or Web Series - Clutch (Web series)
- Audience Favorite Short Film - Trey McGriff ("Spooky Snow Day")

2012
- The Biggest Baddest Mother of the PollyGrind — Daddy's Little Girl (Chris Sun)
- Best Found Footage Film — The Video Diary of Madi O, Final Entries (Submitted by Harold Brodie)
- Best Arthouse Film — My Name is A by anonymous (Shane Ryan)
- Best Exploitation Film — Day Job (Dave O’Shea)
- Best Horror Film — (I Am a Ghost) (H.P. Mendoza)
- Best Crime Film – Bulletface (Albert Pyun)
- Best Thriller — Zero in the System (Tim McCann)
- Best Action Film — Burlesque Assassins (Jonathan Joffe)
- Best Fantasy Film — Road to Hell (Albert Pyun)
- Best Dark Comedy — Race War: The Remake (Tom Martino)
- Best Foreign Language Film — Fat Cat (Michele Fiascaris)
- Best of Zombiepalooza — After the Dawn (Mitchel A. Jones)
- Best Experimental Film — Blood for Irina (Chris Alexander)
- Best Animated Film — Blood Trail (Emerson Frakes)
- Best Science Fiction Film — Trash and Progress (Abraham Dieckman)
- Best Transgression Film — Hate Crime (James Cullen Bressack)
- Best Documentary — Nightmare Factory (Donna Davies)
- Best Horror Short — Sunday's Child (Virgile Dean)
- Best Director — Chris Sun (Daddy's Little Girl)
- Best Woman Director — Lindsay Denniberg (Video Diary of a Lost Girl)
- Best Female Short Film Director — Jennifer Campbell (Hike)
- Director on the Rise — Henry Weintraub (Killing Me)
- Director Showcase Award — Richard Griffin (The Disco Exorcist / Exhumed)
- Best Overall Individual Performance — Michael Thomson as Derek in Daddy's Little Girl
- Best Overall Cast — Debbie Rochon as Governess, Michael Reed as Chris, Evalena Marie as Rocki, Sarah Nicklin as Laura, Jocelyn Padilla as Cute College Girl, Nathaniel Sylva as Matthew. Jonathan Thomson as Nate, Rich Tretheway as Lance, & Michael Thurber as Butler in Exhumed
- Best Actor — Michael Paré as Cody in Road to Hell
- Best Actress — Clare Kramer as Caitlin in Road to Hell
- Best Actress in a short film— Erin Brown as Starlight in This Girl's Gun (Lukas Persson)
- Best Supporting Actor — Scott Paulin as Brendon Wexler in Bulletface
- Best Supporting Actress — Angela Favella as Gloria in Fat Cat
- Best Cameo Appearance — Jessica Cameron as Marilyn Monroe in The Black Dahlia Haunting
- Best Screenplay — Daddy's Little Girl (Chris Sun)
- Best Writer — Cynthia Curnan (Road to Hell / Cool Air)
- Best Cinematography — When Time Becomes a Woman (Zaid Baqaeen)
- Best Visual Effects — Road to Hell (Daniel Ray Gutierrez)
- Best Song — Streets of Fire (Road to Hell)
- Best Film Score — H.P. Lovecraft's Cool Air (Tony Riparetti)
- Best Editing — President Wolfman (Mike Davis)
- Best Sound Design — Bulletface (Tony Riparetti)
- Best Poster — Play Hooky (Frank S. Petrilli)
- Best Use of Nudity/Sexuality — The Black Dahlia Haunting (Brandon Slagle)
- Best Use of Violence/Gore — Day Job (Dave O'Shea)
- Best Use of Music — Road to Hell (Albert Pyun)
- Most Innovative — Play Hooky (Frank S. Petrilli)
- Most Outrageous — Adam Chaplin: Violent Avenger (Emanuele De Santi)
- Most Creative — President Wolfman (Mike Davis)
- Most Heart — Johnny Ghost (Donna McRae)
- Most Cool — Beyond the Grave (Davi de Oliveira Pinheiro)
- Most Horrifying — Hate Crime (James Cullen Bressack)
- Breakthrough Role — Nicole Kruex (After the Dawn)
- Newcomer Award — Roxy Gunn (Road to Hell)
- Scream Queen Award — Devanny Pinn (The Black Dahlia Haunting)
- Super Thug Award — Howard Calvert (Race War: The Remake)
- Actress in a Horror Film — Debbie Rochon (Exhumed)
- Actress in a Fantasy Film — Priscilla McEver (Video Diary of a Lost Girl)
- Supporting Actress in a Fantasy Film — Deborah Van Valkenburgh (Road To Hell)
- Supporting Actress in a Horror Film —Wendy Phillips (H.P. Lovecraft's Cool Air)
- Actor in Multiple Roles — Morgan Weisser (Bulletface / H.P. Lovecraft's Cool Air)
- Bad Girl Award — Victoria Maurette (Bulletface)
- Ultimate Badass Award — Tony Todd (The Mannsfield 12)
- Filmmaker of a Different Breed — Albert Pyun

2011
- The Biggest Baddest Mother of the PollyGrind — The Bunny Game (Adam Rehmeier)
- Best Horror Film — The Super (Evan Makrogiannis / Brian Weaver)
- Best Exploitation Film — Dear God No! (James Bickert)
- Best Experimental Film — Zooey & Adam (Sean Garrity)
- Best Action Film — 25K (Billy Chase Goforth)
- Best Crime Film — Ratline (Eric Stanze)
- Best Dark Comedy — The Gruesome Death of Tommy Pistol (Aramis Sartorio)
- Best Documentary — Run Run It's Him (Matthew Pollack)
- Best of Zombiepalooza — Ashes (Elias Matar)
- Best Sound Design — The Bunny Game (Adam Rehmeier)
- Best Director — The Super (Evan Makrogiannis / Brian Weaver)
- Best Screenplay — Butterfly (Edward E. Romero)
- Best Cinematography — The Bunny Game (Adam Rehmeier)
- Best Editing — The Bunny Game (Adam Rehmeier)
- Best Overall Individual Performance in a Film — Rodleen Getsic as Bunny in The Bunny Game
- Best Overall Cast — Demetri Kallas as George Rossi, Lynn Lowry as Maureen Rossi, Ron Braunstein as Det. Sardusky, Manoush as Olga, Ruby Larocca as Karen, Edgar Moye as Andre, Brandon Slagle as Franny the Tranny, with David Francis Calderazzo, Bill McLaughlin, Raine Brown and Kathryn Zawiski in The Super
- Best Actor — Aramis Sartorio as Tommy Pistol in The Gruesome Death of Tommy Pistol
- Best Actress — Mandi Kreisher as Laney Darrow, Butterfly
- Best Supporting Actor — Brett Hundley as Tommy Spioch in Frankie in Blunderland
- Best Supporting Actress — Manoush as Olga in The Super
- Best Cameo Appearance — Evan Stone as The Butterfly in Frankie in Blunderland
- Best Use of Nudity/Sexuality — Planet of the Vampire Women (Darin Wood)
- Best Use of Violence/Gore — Sella Turcica (Fred Vogel)
- Best Use of Music — Ratline (Eric Stanze)
- Most Outrageous — The Gruesome Death of Tommy Pistol (Aramis Sartorio)
- Most Creative — Mondo Sexxxx: The Terry Kobrah Story (Logan Myers)
- Most Innovative — The Earl Sessions (Ginnetta Correli)
- Most Heart — The Girl Who Wasn't Missing (Shane Ryan)
- Most Cool — El Monstro Del Mar (Stuart Simpson)
- Audience's Favorite Feature — Dear God No! (James Bickert)
- Bad Girl Award — Beverly Lynne as Janis Drake in The Atonement of Janis Drake
- Ultimate Badass Award — Ezra Buzzington as Hate, Breath of Hate

2010
- The Biggest Baddest Mother of the PollyGrind — Slime City Massacre (Greg Lamberson)
- Audience's Favorite Feature — Dead Hooker in a Trunk (The Soska Sisters - Jen Soska & Sylvia Soska)
- Best Actor — Kealan Patrick Burke as Cory (Slime City Massacre)
- Best Actress — Beth Winslet as The Femme Fatale (Stiletto)
- Best Director — Calvin Lee Reeder (The Rambler and The Snake Mountain Colada)
- Best Screenplay — Dead Hooker in a Trunk (Jen Soska & Sylvia Soska)
- Bad Girl Award — Jen Soska & Sylvia Soska (Dead Hooker in a Trunk)
- Ultimate Badass Award — Luke Goss (The Dead Undead)

== World premieres ==
=== 2014 ===
- Rebel Scum
- Teddy Bomb
- The Interrogation of Cheryl Cooper
- Spirits
- Heidi
- Black Mask
- World of Death: PollyGrind Edition
- The Beauty Strip

=== 2013 ===
- Jonas
- To Jennifer
- 13/13/13
- Slaughterhouse Bride
- House of Forbidden Secrets
- Buried In Flesh
- Desolate
- Darkest Days
- American Girls
- Faceless - Best Screenplay : Jack "Saint" Hunter
- Sweet Leaf
- Diet of Sex
- The Minstrel Killer
- The Synthetic Man
- The Yellow Bellies
- Sacrifice: In the Name of Goddess Gadhimai
- Tricks
- Eye of the Bennu
- Legend of the Hillbilly Butcher
- Bruised
- The Window
- Marty's House

=== 2012 ===
- After the Dawn
- Trash and Progress
- My Name Is 'A' by Anonymous
- Zero in the System
- When Time Becomes a Woman
- Planet Megadolce
- Blood for Irina
- Day Job
- The Smell of Love
- Play Hooky
- Fat Cat
- Bulletface
- Video Diary of a Lost Girl
- "A Monster Among Men"
- Sunday's Child
- REW

=== 2011 ===
- Mondo Sexxxx: The Terry Kobrah Story
- The Las Vegas Abductions
- The Gruesome Death of Tommy Pistol
- The Girl Who Wasn't Missing
- Finger Bang
- The Los Angeles Ripper
- The Atonement of Janis Drake
- The Earl Sessions

=== 2010 ===
- Vaginal Holocaust
- Caged Lesbos A-Go-Go
- Orgy of Blood
- The Dead Undead
- Scars of Youth
