= Zwolak =

Zwolak is a Polish surname. Notable people with the surname include:

- Jessica Zwolak, actress in 2015 musical horror comedy film Killer Rack
- Justyna Zwolak, Polish-American applied mathematician
- Vic Zwolak (born 1938), American middle-distance runner
