= Jason John Beebe =

American actor and filmmaker

- Occupations: Actor, filmmaker
- Years active: 2011–present

Jason John Beebe is an American actor and filmmaker. He is known for his starring role in the 2013 film Not Human. He has appeared in several low-budget horror films, including Snow Shark, Sharknado 2: The Second One, and A Grim Becoming. He is set to appear in the upcoming films Lake Effect and Fang.

== Selected filmography ==
=== As actor ===
- Snow Shark (2012)
- Battledogs (2013)
- Not Human (2013)
- Sharknado 2: The Second One (2014)
- A Grim Becoming (2014)
- Lake Effect (TBA)
- Fang (2018)
