= Snow Shark: Ancient Snow Beast =

2012 American horror film

Snow Shark
- Cover art by Sam Qualiana
- Directed by: Sam Qualiana
- Written by: Sam Qualiana
- Produced by: Richard Chizmar; Marc Makowski; Greg Lamberson
- Starring: Sam Qualiana; Michael O'Hear; Kathy Murphy; C. J. Qualiana; Jackey Hall
- Cinematography: Sam Qualiana
- Edited by: Brett Piper; Mark Polonia
- Music by: Michael Girard Paul
- Production company: Metroshia Productions
- Distributed by: Independent Entertainment
- Release dates: April 10, 2012 (Dipson's Amherst Theatre); May 12, 2012 (South Bronx Film Festival)
- Running time: 79 minutes
- Country: United States
- Language: English
- Budget: $7,000 (estimated)

Snow Shark: Ancient Snow Beast is a 2012 American horror film written and directed by Sam Qualiana, and produced by Richard Chizmar, Marc Makowski, and Greg Lamberson. The film stars Qualiana alongside Michael O'Hare, Kathy Murphy, C. J. Qualiana, Jackey Hall and Andrew Elias. The film follows the residents of a small town who are terrorized by a prehistoric man-eating shark that can swim through snow.

Production on Snow Shark began in early 2011. The film primarily uses practical effects rather than computer-generated imagery, and its budget was partially financed by a campaign on the crowdfunding website Indiegogo. The film, which was shot in Lockport, New York, premiered at Dipson's Amherst Theatre on April 10, 2012, and received mixed reviews. The film was released on DVD by Independent Entertainment.

== Plot ==
On February 6, 1999, a team of three biologists, led by Professor Jonathan Hoffman, investigate a series of supposed wildlife killings in a wooded area near a small New York town. One of the biologists, Bianca, suspects that the killings may have something to do with a recent earthquake. When Hoffman and the other biologist, Gabriel, go off to investigate the wildlife disappearances, they discover the corpse of a mutilated deer. Upon returning to the campsite, they find that Bianca has discovered a hole in the ground. From this, the group determines that a prehistoric creature that has been frozen for thousands of years was freed by the earthquake, and has been killing the wildlife. The creature appears and kills both Gabriel and Bianca, leaving Hoffman to deduce that it is a "snow shark" before it attacks him.

Twelve years later, the snow shark has become a town legend. The town's mayor, Shawn Overman, is informed when two residents are killed by the shark, and he and Sheriff Donald Chapman hold a town meeting. During the meeting, one of the residents, Mike Evans, claims that the killings were caused by the shark, despite him having said to have killed the creature seven years earlier. Against Chapman's warnings, he sets out to kill the shark once and for all. That night, Chapman and his son Ethan get into an argument. Ethan leaves to drink beer outside with his friend Doug, and is killed by the shark while urinating. The next day, with the rest of the police force already at the scene, a distraught Chapman sees Ethan's corpse and questions Doug about the incident. When Doug claims that Ethan's death was caused by a shark, Chapman believes him and becomes determined to kill it.

Cryptozoologist Lincoln Anderson, biologist Wendy Gardner, and hunter Cameron Caine visit the town and have a brief meeting with Overman to discuss capturing the shark. With six of his friends, armed with guns, Mike ventures into the forest to hunt the shark. The shark kills everyone in the party except for Mike. Following this, Chapman, Lincoln, Wendy, and Cameron make their way into the woods, armed with a miniature crossbow, a shotgun, and a motion-sensing camera. They set up the camera on a tree and depart. At the town bar, Professor Hoffman enters, having gone into hiding and now wearing an eyepatch. Later, he and a grieving Mike drink beers.

When Lincoln finds that the camera has not detected any motion, the group sets out into the forest once more. Wendy is dragged away by the shark and killed. The shark attacks Cameron, and Chapman shoots Cameron in the head. Hoffman and Mike soon join up with Chapman and Lincoln. Hoffman plans to start a large fire to attract the shark, as he surmises that the heat will confuse it, but it kills him before he can do so. The shark bites off Mike's legs, and Chapman and Lincoln flee. Mike pulls the pin on a hand grenade, causing both him and the shark to explode. After reporting the incident to the police station, Chapman and Lincoln see multiple shark fins in the snow and escape. Later, a woman named Daphne approaches Ethan's grave to lay a wreath, and a shark fin approaches her as she walks out of the graveyard.

== Cast ==
- Sam Qualiana as Mike Evans
- Michael O'Hear as Professor Jonathan Hoffman
- Kathy Thiel Murphy as Wendy Gardner
- C. J. Qualiana as Sheriff Donald Chapman
- Jackey Hall as Daphne
- Andrew Elias as Lincoln Anderson
- Andrew J. Taylor as Cameron Caine
- Robert Bozek as Mayor Shawn Overman
- Jason John Beebe as Deputy Benny Carlyle
- John Renna as Ethan

== Production ==
=== Development ===
Production on Snow Shark began in early 2011, with director Sam Qualiana having created the film's title, poster, and a teaser trailer before finalizing its script. Qualiana has stated, "I always have had a fear of sharks. Not a lot of things scare me, but sharks terrify and fascinate me at the same time." Qualiana viewed the film as a mixture of the 1975 thriller film Jaws and the 1982 science-fiction horror film The Thing.

=== Filming and post-production ===
Snow Shark began shooting in Lockport, New York, in January 2011, partially supported by an Indiegogo campaign launched by Qualiana with a fundraising goal of $3,000. Filming was met with minor weather-related difficulties, including overcoming cold temperatures and the task of preventing snow from gathering on the lens of the camera. Qualiana later stated, "The actors were troupers".

Aside from instances of blood shown onscreen, the film's visual effects were created without the use of computer-generated imagery. John Renna, who portrays the character Ethan, constructed a full-size shark head to use during filming. Effects artists Andrew Lavin and Arick Szymecki created a miniature shark head, as well as several landscapes, to be used in the film. Some of the film's scenes were shot on weekends in order to prevent the melting of snow due to the arrival of spring. Qualiana noted that "it was tough getting all the exterior shots before the snow melted. We cancelled some shoots due to warm weather and managed to do some cutaways outside with fake snow".

Production ended in Lockport in June 2011. Post-production was managed by Qualiana and producer Greg Lamberson, alongside B-movie horror screenwriter Brett Piper and low-budget filmmaker Mark Polonia.

== Release and reception ==
The film premiered at Dipson's Amherst Theater in Buffalo on April 10, 2012, and was subsequently shown at the Screening Room Cinema Café in Williamsville, New York two days later. On May 12, the film was screened at the South Bronx Film Festival. The film was released on DVD and was made available for digital download on December 11, 2012; it was distributed through Independent Entertainment.

Brett Gallmann of the website Oh, the Horror! criticized the film's "amateurism, from the acting to the hastily sloshed upon digital effects", likening it to a "no-budget Troma affair" that "excels at being mostly forgettable". John Lyle of the website Bloodbath & Beyond gave the film a score of 0.5/5, criticizing the brief overall time that the snow shark is shown onscreen.

Nathaniel Thompson of Mondo Digital wrote that, in regards to "Jaws rip-offs", it was "one of the more entertaining ones in recent years". Adrian Halen of HorrorNews.net found fault with the film's "tiring" dialogue but admired its "charming" special effects, writing that it shows "just enough shark to make us hunger for more". In a review of the film's DVD release on the website HorrorTalk, the film is referred to as "bad, real bad, but in all the most awesome ways possible".

== See also ==
- List of natural horror films
- Avalanche Sharks
- Sand Sharks
