= Debbie Rochon =

Canadian actress

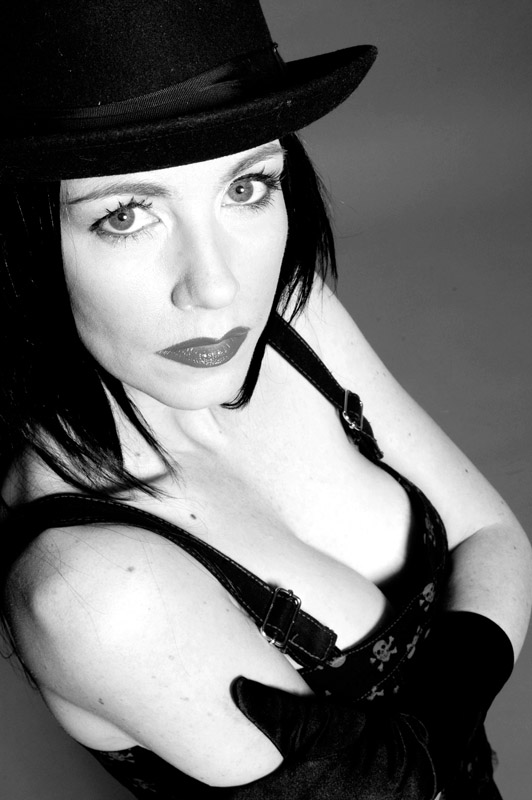
- Debbie Rochon 2004 photo taken by Gary Cook, Image Group
- Born: Vancouver, British Columbia, Canada
- Occupation: Actress
- Years active: 1982–present
- Website: debbierochon.com

Debbie Rochon is a Canadian actress and former stage performer, best known for her work in independent film and counterculture films.

== Career ==
In 1980, Rochon was cast as a punk-fan rock-concert extra in Ladies and Gentlemen, The Fabulous Stains after being alerted to an open-casting call by another homeless youth. She worked for three months and earned $300 cash a week. That experience made her fall in love with filmmaking and acting. By age 17, she had saved enough money to move to New York City. Rochon worked with off-off-Broadway theater companies, performing in over 25 stage productions. She garnered her first printed review in Backstage which read: "Debbie Rochon acquitted herself well as the cocaloony bird in Tennessee Williams' The Gnadiges Fraulein."

Rochon then focused on the cinema. Her first substantial role was in Banned, a 1989 film director by Roberta Findlay. She then went on to appear in over two hundred independent features. The Hubcap Awards founder Joe Bob Briggs crowned Rochon as runner-up Best Actress of the year in 1994 for her work on Abducted II: The Reunion. In 1995, she was recognized for her work as the conniving television producer in Broadcast Bombshells, winning the Barbarella Award.

She was a featured guest player on Fox's New York Undercover. In 2002, Rochon was crowned Scream Queen of the Decade (1990–1999) by Draculina magazine, based on reader voting. She also received Best Psychette Award 2002 (Best Female Psycho in a Movie) for her work in American Nightmare.

In 2002, while working on an unreleased film in Tennessee, Rochon suffered an accident with a machete which resulted in the near-severing of the four fingers of her right hand. After extensive surgeries and physical therapy, she regained limited use of the hand.

In 2004, Rochon won MicroCinemaFest's "Best Comedy Actress" award for her work in Dr. Horror's Erotic House of Idiots. She also co-hosted the 2005 Village Halloween Parade with Dee Snider. The following year, she and Snider began broadcasting Fangoria Radio on Sirius Satellite Radio, a weekly talk show of horror movie news and reviews. The show ran from 2006 till 2010. She appeared regularly at Fangoria's Weekend of Horrors conventions when they were being produced.

In 2008, Rochon appeared in several new horror ventures, including the Michigan-made film Dog, Savaged, The Colour from the Dark, Psychosomatika, and Beg. She can also be seen in the After Dark-released film Mulberry Street, directed by Jim Mickle, which had a theatrical run as part of the Horrorfest series in 2007.

Rochon is a character in the 2008 novel Bad Moon Rising by Jonathan Maberry. She is one of several real-world horror celebrities who are in the fictional town of Pine Deep when monsters attack. Other celebrities include Tom Savini, Jim O'Rear, Brinke Stevens, Ken Foree, Stephen Susco, Joe Bob Briggs, James Gunn, and Mem Shannon.

She appeared in a 2009 documentary Pretty Bloody: The Women of Horror. Also in 2009, she starred as Alice in Slime City Massacre, a sequel to the cult film Slime City; both films were directed by Gregory Lamberson. She presented the movie on the Premiere at 2010 Beloit International Film Festival on February 18, 2010.

Rochon appeared in a feature film by Sean Pomper Productions, Killer Hoo-Ha!.

She portrayed Madam Won Ton in the 2011 horror comedy film Won Ton Baby! by James Morgart.

She portrayed Eleanor of Aquitaine in the 2014 film Richard the Lionheart: Rebellion.

By 2015, she had been nominated four times for the Rondo Hatton Classic Horror Award for her column "Diary of the Deb" in Fangoria magazine. She won the coveted award for her column in 2014. She continues to be nominated annually for her film column "The Rochon Report" featured in Videoscope magazine.

Breaking Glass Pictures released the feature film Dollface in September 2015, in which Rochon stars as a foul-mouthed groundskeeper. She was praised for her performance in Dollface, which won numerous awards in 2014/2015 including Horror Society's "Best Indie Horror Film of 2014". Also in 2015, she made her directorial debut with the horror thriller film Model Hunger.

Rochon lived in New York City from 1984 to 2014. She worked for the horror magazine Fangoria for the last 14 years of its publication until it was bought in 2018 by Cinestate.

Entertainment Tonight listed Rochon as one of "The Top 40 Scream Queens of the Past 40 Years" on October 17, 2018.

Playboy Ranks The 50 Sexiest Scream Queens Of All Time; Debbie Rochon ranked #8.

Rochon was cast as Maureen in the cult horror film Human Hibachi 3: The Last Supper, directed by Mario Cerrito.

== Model acting ==
Rochon has appeared on many film-related magazine covers including:

- Fangoria Magazine
- Rue Morgue Magazine
- The Phantom of the Movies' Videoscope Magazine
- Vamperotica Magazine
- Vampirella Magazine
- Draculina Magazine
- Three covers for Femme Fatales magazine
- Three covers for Scream Queens Illustrated magazine
- Two covers for Sirens of Cinema Magazine
- Gotham Magazine
- Too Square Magazine
- Three covers for Alternative Cinema Magazine
- Spice Magazine
- B-movies Magazine
- The Dark Side Magazine

Rochon has written for numerous genre publications including:

- Fangoria magazine, her regular column is titled "Diary of the Deb"
- The Phantom of the Movies' VIDEOSCOPE magazine
- Steppin' Out Magazine
- The Gore Zone Magazine
- Femme Fatales magazine
- Sirens of Cinema Magazine
- Chiller Theatre Magazine
- Scars Magazine
- Masters of Kung Fu Magazine

As well as a regular column in The Joe Bob Report (published by Joe Bob Briggs)

== Selected filmography ==
- Ladies and Gentlemen, The Fabulous Stains (1980)
- Negatives (1988)
- Santa Claws (1996)
- Tromeo and Juliet (1996)
- Terror Firmer (1999)
- American Nightmare (2002)
- Bleed (2002)
- Play-mate of the Apes (2002)
- Final Examination (2003)
- Corpses Are Forever (2003)
- Something to Scream About (2004)
- Nowhere Man (2005)
- Attack of the Tromaggot (2006)
- The Deepening (2007)
- Dog (2009)
- Fearmakers (2008)
- Colour From The Dark (2008)
- October Moon 2: November Son (2008)
- Dahmer Vs. Gacy (2009)
- Dark Karma (2009)
- Hanger (2009)
- Nun of That (2009)
- Stopped Dead (2009)
- Cottonmouth (2009)
- Killer Hoo Ha (2010)
- Psychic Experiment (2010) (formally Walking Distance)
- Slime City Massacre (2010)
- Won Ton Baby! (2010)
- As Night Falls (2010)
- Demon Divas and the Lanes of Damnation (2010)
- Scream Queens (2010) - Episode 4
- Sick Boy (2011)
- Exhumed (2011)
- Solid State (2012)
- Wrath of the Crows (2013)
- Billy's Cult (2013)
- Richard the Lionheart: Rebellion (2014)
- Disciples (2014)
- The House of Covered Mirrors (2015)
- Killer Rack (2015)
- The Ungovernable Force (2016)
- Dollface (2015)
- Accidental Switch (2016)
- Model Hunger (2016)
- Death House (2017)
- Post Apocalyptic Commando Shark (2018)
- Bloody Ballet (2018)
- Cool as Hell 2 (2019)
- Killer Babes and the Frightening Film Fiasco (2020)
- Mystery Spot (2021)
- Bloody Hooker Massacre (2022)
- Exorcism of Fleete Marish (2022)
- Slumber Party Slaughter Party 2 (2023)
- The Devil's Disciples (2024)
- Special Needs Revolt! (2024)
- Axe2Grind (2025)

== Awards ==
- 1st Runner up in Joe Bob Briggs' 1996 Hubbie Award for Best Actress in "Abducted II: The Reunion" (1994).
- 1997 Barbarella Award for best actress in "Broadcast Bombshells" (1995).
- 2002 Phantom of the Movies' Videoscope award "Best Psychette" (Best Female Psycho in a movie) for her role as 'Jane Toppan' in "American Nightmare" (2002).
- 'Scream Queen of the Decade Award' (1990 to present) from Draculina Magazine (2003) reader's poll.
- Inducted into the B-Movie Hall of Fame October 2004.
- 2004 Micro Cinema Film Festival Award for "Best Actress in a Comedy" for her work in "Dr. Horror's Erotic House of Idiots".
- Won Best Supporting Actress Award for her work in the comedy sci-fi send-up "Screech of the Decapitated" at the 2005 B-Movie Awards.
- Won Best Actress at the 2011 Buffalo Screams Film Festival for her role in Bart Mastronardi's THE TELL TALE HEART - part of the TALES OF POE (2012) horror anthology.
- Was inducted into The Hell of Fame Feb. 2012.
- Won Best Actress Award at The Golden Cobs 2011 for her role in Alien Vengeance (2010).
- Won Best Actress Award at the Macabre Faire Film Festival 2012 for her role in The Tell Tale Heart.
- Served as a jury member on the first all female jury at The Oldenburg Film Festival 2012, alongside Mira Sorvino, Gabrielle Miller, Tamar Simon Hoffs and Lana Morgan.
- Won Best Actress Award at the 2012 Terror Film Festival for her work in The Tell Tale Heart.
- Won Best Actress Award at the 2012 Pollygrind Film Festival for her work in Exhumed.
- Honored with the inaugural Ingrid Pitt Award for Excellence and Perseverance in Horror on January 12, 2013.
