= As Night Falls =

- Directed by: Joe Davison
- Written by: Joe Davison
- Starring: Debbie Rochon, Julie Anne, Deneen Melody
- Cinematography: Brian Bourke
- Edited by: Joshua Long, Stu McLaughlin, Michael Seitzler
- Music by: Clint Bailly
- Production companies: FEAR FILM Motion Picture Studios, Pop Gun Pictures, Us and the Other Us Productions
- Release date: November 12, 2013
- Country: United States
- Language: English

As Night Falls (released in Germany as Die Nacht der Zombies) is a 2013 horror film directed by Joe Davison. It was created in 2010 but was not released until November 12, 2013, when it was sent straight to DVD. It stars Debbie Rochon as a mother who returns from the dead to "discipline" anyone she thinks is naughty.

== Premise ==
Sisters Holly (Lily Cardone) and Elizabeth (Deneen Melody) are living in a house of murder. Fifty years ago, a young girl named Amelia (Grace Chapman) was brutally murdered by unseen methods. Now her parents have returned from their grave to enact their own strict discipline on anyone they believe is misbehaving and staying up past nightfall.

== Cast ==
- Debbie Rochon as Nelly Trine / The Mother
- Julie Anne as Olivia
- Deneen Melody as Elizabeth
- Raine Brown as Stephanie
- Rod Grant as Principal
- Jeremy King as Tim
- Brian Kahrs as Jimmy, The Cop / Zombie
- Lily Cardone as Holly
- Ken Anthony II as Steve
- Joe Davison as Charlie
- Dwight Cenac as Otto
- Grace Chapman as Amelia
- Stacci Sastre Reed as Erica
- André Reissig as Pennywise
- Tyler Cross as Dude

== Reception ==
Critical reception for As Night Falls was negative and Bloody Disgusting panned the film's acting as particularly bad. Ain't It Cool News and HorrorNews.net also gave negative reviews, with HorrorNews.net commenting that "it ain’t the worst thing I’ve seen this month but it’s pretty disappointing all the same." DVD Verdict gave a mixed review, saying that while the film wasn't "guilty" it was also generic and that "Those looking for new scares or novel pleasures should steer clear."
