= Carl Fredrik Hill =

Swedish painter and draftsman

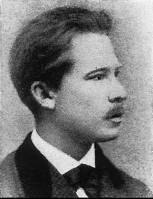
Carl Fredrik Hill as a young student

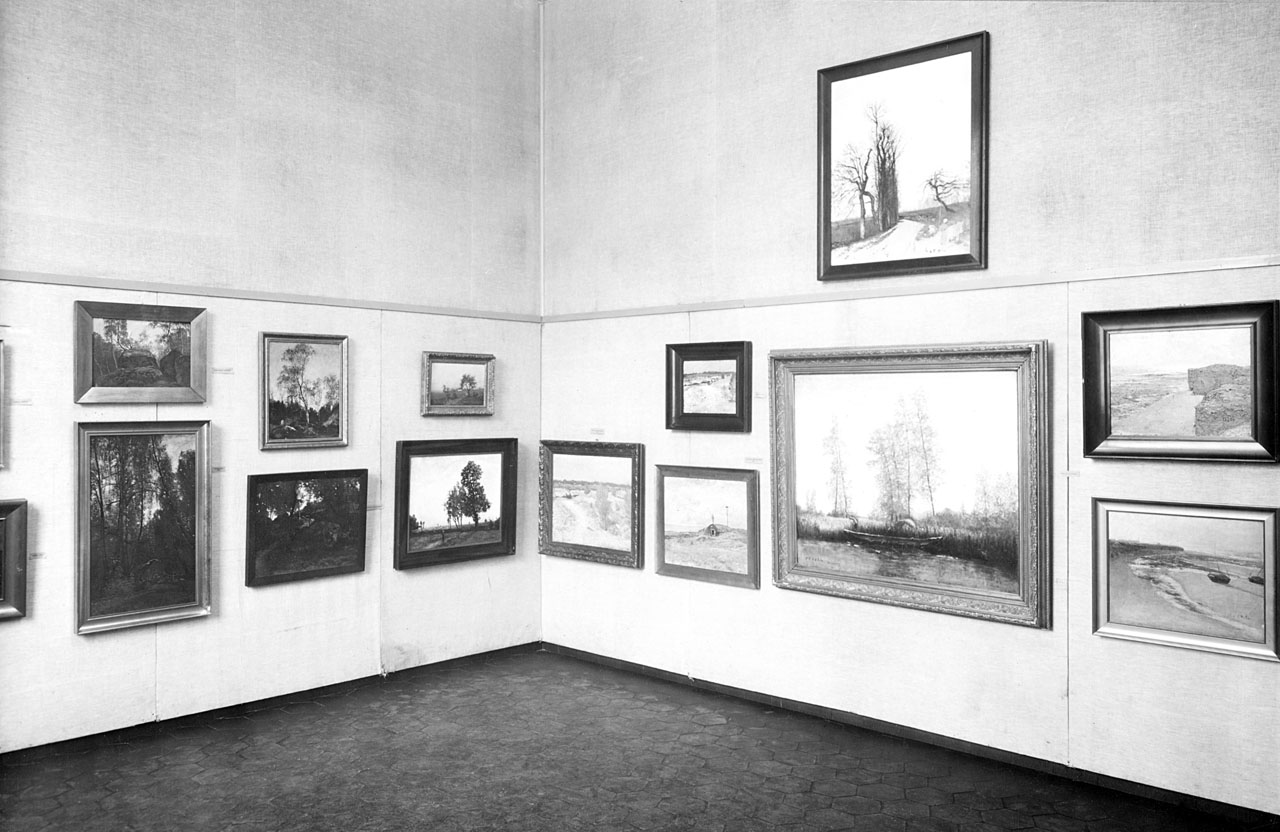
Oil and watercolour paintings by Carl Fredrik Hill in the gallery for temporary exhibits at the Gothenburg Museum of Art, 1934

Carl Fredrik Hill (31 May 1849 – 22 February 1911) was a Swedish painter and draftsman. He is known for the atmospheric landscapes he painted during the first four years of his career, and for the drawings of fantastical scenes he created after he became mentally ill in his late twenties.

== Biography ==
=== Early life and training ===
Born the son of a mathematics professor, Hill grew up in the university town of Lund in southern Sweden and had to strike out on his own as a landscape painter against his father's wishes. After studying at the Royal Swedish Academy of Fine Arts, he went to France. In the summer of 1874, he travelled to the village of Barbizon south of Paris, which was a thriving artists' colony. Both the Barbizon School and Camille Corot had a decisive influence on him.

=== Career ===
Seine landscape and Populus (1877)

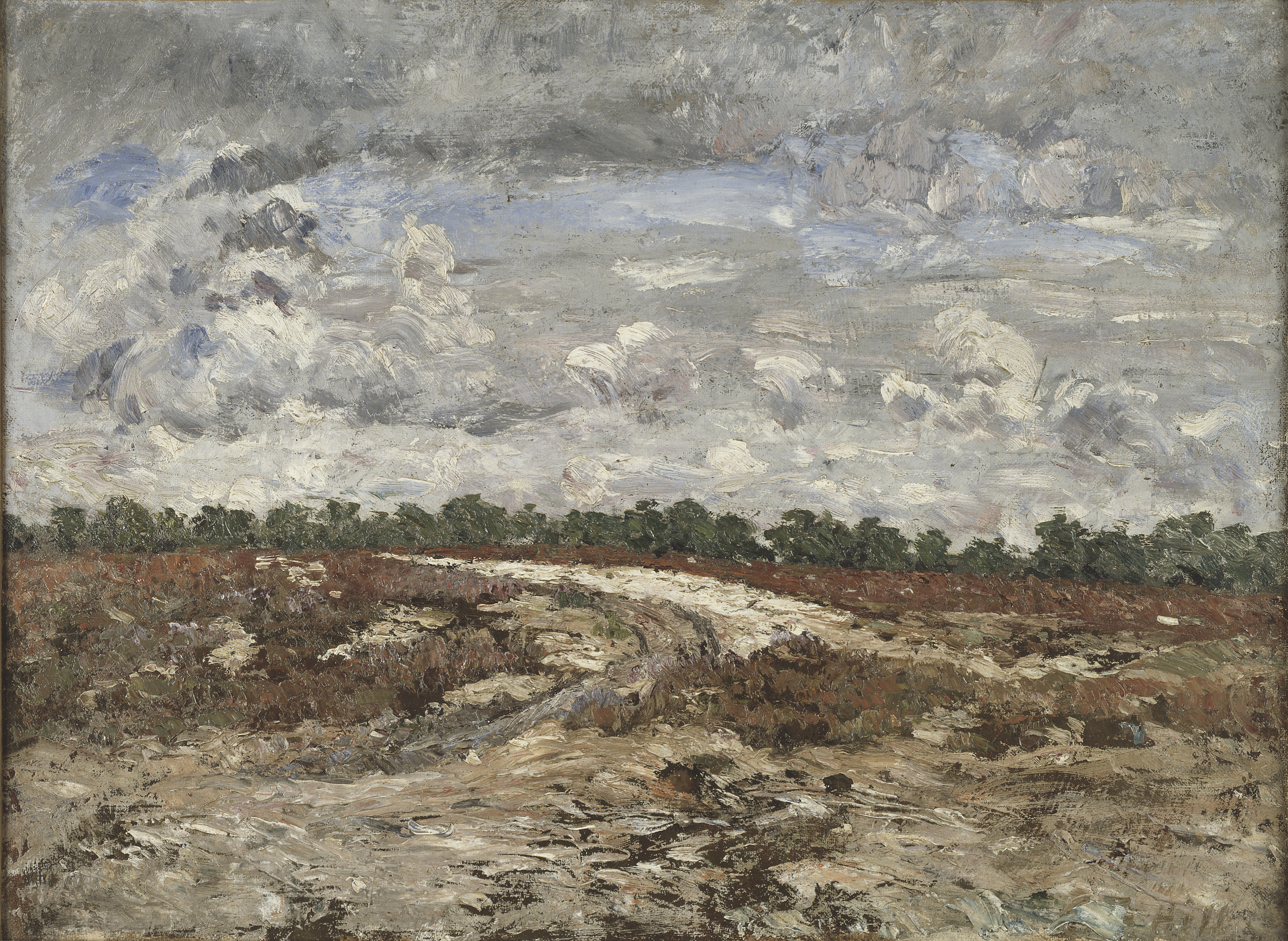
Wild Country in the Forest of Fontainebleau (1876)

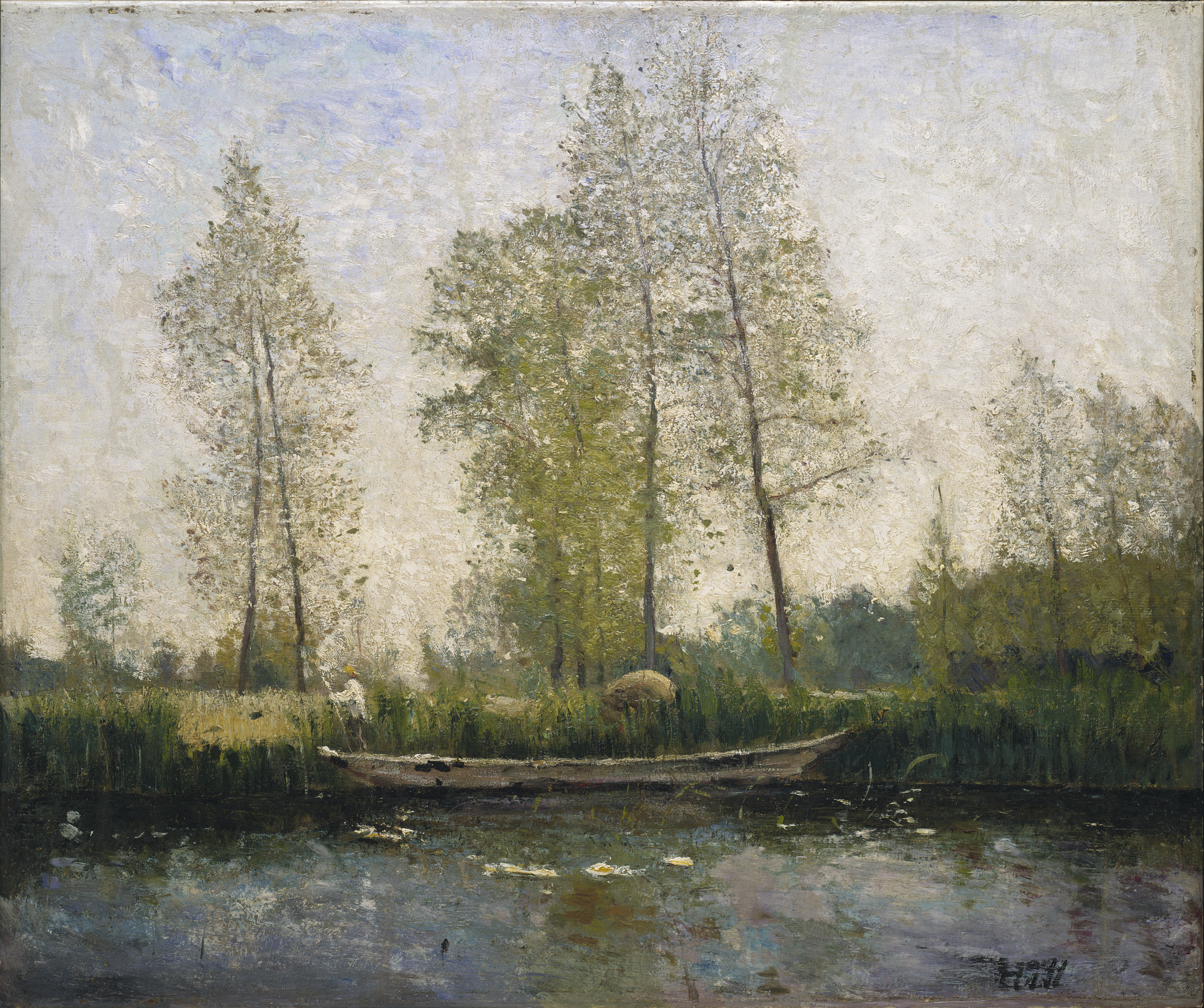
Seine. Motif from St Germain (1877)

Hill wrote: “I have become convinced that art has no other goal than the truth, le vrai. Not the tritely naturalistic, but the true heart." He sought his subjects at different sites in France; Montigny-sur-Loing, Champagne and Normandy. Influenced by Impressionism, he abandoned the dark coloration of his early paintings in 1876, and began painting in a freer style, sometimes applying impasto with a palette knife. "Ambition drives me to overexert myself and I give myself no peace" he said. Yet, Hill's endeavors were not crowned with official success; his works were rejected when he presented them at the Paris Salon. After a severe psychotic attack in January 1878 and subsequent hospitalization, his career as a landscape painter came to an end at the age of 28. He was diagnosed with hallucinations and paranoia. Friends helped him return home to Sweden where he gained sanctuary at his parental home after a short period at St. Lars mental hospital in Lund. At home he was cared for by his mother and a sister for 28 years until his death in 1911. Hill was buried at Östra churchyard in Lund.

=== Later period ===
During the 28 years before his death, Hill's creative work entered a new phase. The Swedish art historian Ragnar Josephson calls it "the second great period of his life as a painter". His artistry continued unabated; during these years he drew four drawings a day. The motifs for Hill's drawings in this period came from imagination and memory as well as from older art and illustrations. To Hill, drawing was a way to take control of the new world which had now succeeded the old one. On paper he created a world of his own. Drawing became a way to distract the evil forces that he perceived surrounding him constantly. He defended himself, using a pencil as his weapon. "The prince of whispers ... where the world glows in a blood-red struggle" writes Gunnar Ekelöf in a poem to Hill.

Hill never lived to see his recognition as an artist. He produced thousands of drawings in various techniques: crayon, pencil, ink, India ink and watercolour. Some 3,500 drawings are still thought to exist, of which more than 2,600 are part of the collections of the Malmö Art Museum, as are 23 of his oil paintings. The largest collection of all was donated to the Malmö Art Museum by Hill's heirs and have been increased with important gifts from private collections.

Hill's drawings were discovered and admired mainly by artists. Thanks to the Swedish collector Rolf de Maré (1888–1964), Hill's work become known in connection with the French avant-garde of the 1920s and 1930s. In 1949, a hundred years after Hill's birth, a travelling exhibition was shown in London, Lucerne, Basel, Geneva and Hamburg. The exhibition was a success, and in 1952 the Institut Tessin in Paris published a book about Hill with an introduction by Jacques Lassaigne. Since then several works about Hill have appeared in Sweden, and Hill exhibitions succeed one another both in Sweden and abroad. Hill is now reckoned as one of Sweden's most important landscape painters, and the drawings done during the time he was ill in Lund have made him known outside Sweden as well.

== Selected works ==
- The Cemetery (1877) Malmö Art Museum
- Quarry with wheel tracks (1877) Malmö Art Museum
- untitled (crying dear) (1883–1911) Malmö Art Museum
- untitled (landscape) (1883–1911) Malmö Art Museum
- untitled (female with demons) (1883–1911) Malmö Art Museum
- untitled (found by the Good Samaritan) (1883–1911) Malmö Art Museum

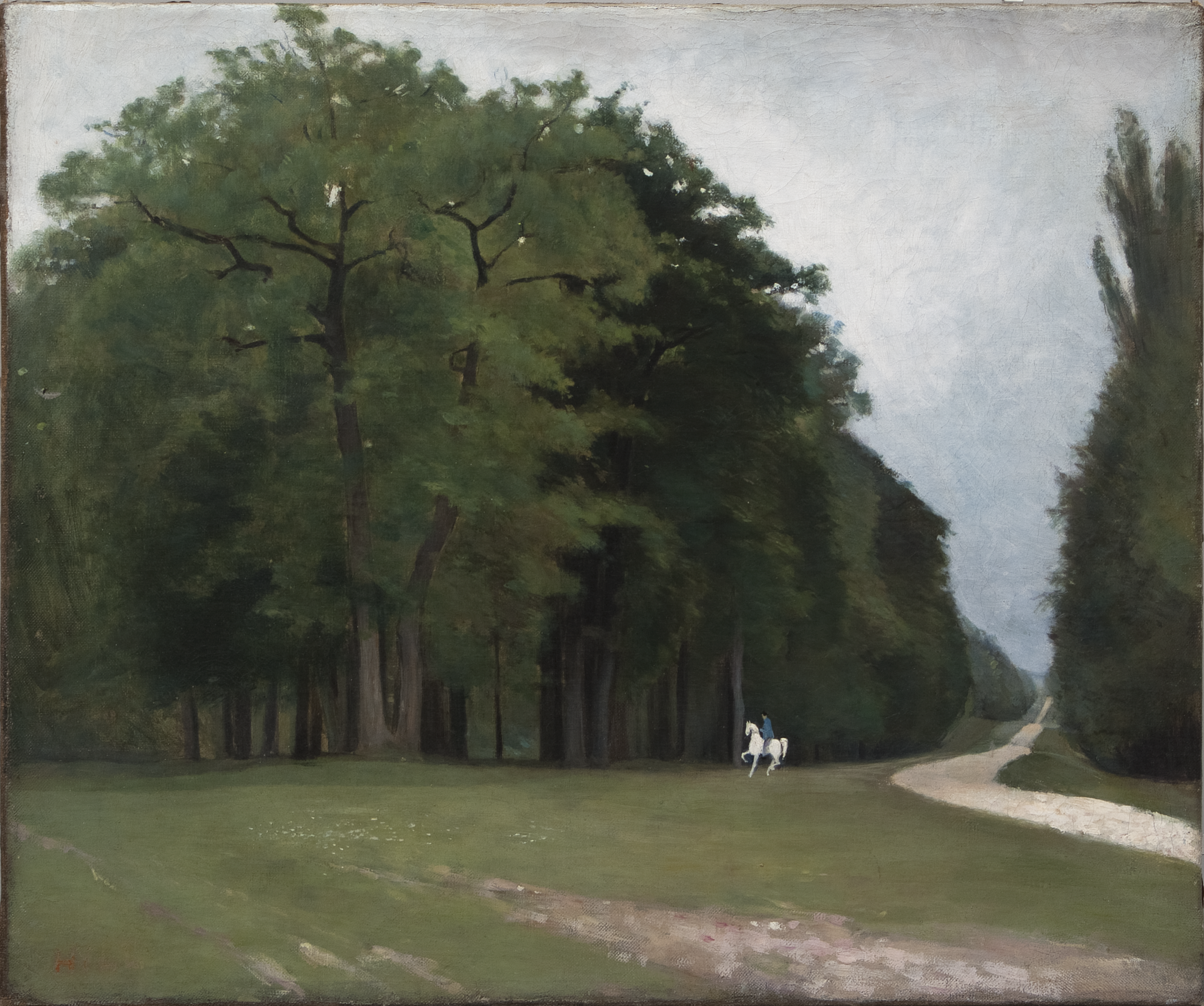
Route de Paris II (1877) The Thiel Gallery Stockholm

== Other sources ==
Media related to Carl Fredrik Hill at Wikimedia Commons

- Lindhagen, Nils (1976). Carl Fredrik Hill Sjukdomsteckningarna. (Malmö: Bernces förlag). ISBN 91-500-0274-0
- Rosdal, Anders. (2003). Hill målar (Malmö: Malmö Art Museum) ISBN 91-87336-67-7
- Christenson, Göran (2000). Carl Fredrik Hill. (Malmö: Malmö Art Museum). ISBN 91-630-9979-9
