= Fang (2018 film) =

2018 American horror film

- Film poster
- Directed by: Adam R. Steigert
- Written by: Adam R. Steigert
- Starring: Melodie Roehrig; Theo Maefs; Melantha Blackthorne; Jason John Beebe; Michael O'Hear
- Production companies: A.R.S. Films; DefTone Pictures Studios
- Release date: October 27, 2018
- Country: United States
- Language: English

Fang is a 2018 horror film written and directed by Adam R. Steigert. The film, which features a werewolf, stars Melodie Roehrig, Theo Maefs, and Melantha Blackthorne. Production for the film began in March 2017.

== Plot ==
After perpetrating a robbery that ended in murder, Chloe and Joe retreat to the home of a distant relative, where they find themselves stalked and hunted by unknown creatures.

== Cast ==
- Melodie Roehrig as Chloe
- Theo Maefs as Joe
- Gregory Blair as Harold
- Melantha Blackthorne as Doris Crowley
- Patrick Mallette as Roy Crowley
- Jason John Beebe as Chris
- Jennie Russo as Shelly
- Sean C. Sanders as Christmas Eve
- Michael O'Hear as William Sanders
- Steve Losey as Sheriff Lucas T. Dutton
- Darren Barcomb as Deputy Thomas
- Johnny Stevenson as Ash Williams
- Scott Emerling as Jason Hart
- Norman Queeno as Nate "Lone Ranger" Damien
- Leora Owens as Carol
- Christopher Burns Jr. as Eric
- Michael Zsiros as John
- Christopher Brechtel as Mick
- Kristin Spencer as Doctor Steigert
