= Bunny Levine =

American actress (1928–2026)

- Born: Bernice Utal; December 22, 1928; East Orange, New Jersey, U.S.
- Died: August 20, 2026 (aged 97); Tarzana, California, U.S.
- Occupation: Actress
- Years active: 1988–2026
- Spouse: Bernard Levine (m. 1949; died 2003)
- Children: 3

Bernice "Bunny" Levine (née Utal; December 22, 1928 – August 20, 2026) was an American actress whose career flourished late in life, with appearances in television series such as Gilmore Girls and films including La La Land and You Don't Mess With the Zohan. Before entering Hollywood, she worked for more than two decades as a school librarian, only pursuing acting seriously after retirement.

== Early life and career ==
Bernice Utal was born in East Orange, New Jersey, on December 22, 1928. She was Jewish. She showed an early interest in theatre, participating in school productions and studying drama at university.

Her first film role came in the cult horror comedy Slime City (1988), followed by a small part in Cadillac Man (1990). After the death of her husband in 2003, Levine moved to Los Angeles and began acting full-time. She quickly became a familiar face in guest roles across American television, appearing in Law & Order, Everybody Loves Raymond, Ugly Betty, Private Practice, Criminal Minds, 2 Broke Girls, Raising Hope, Southland, New Girl, Shameless, Fuller House, and The Mindy Project.

Levine's film credits include The Jimmy Show (2001), A Thousand Words (2012), La La Land (2016), and several collaborations with Adam Sandler, such as You Don't Mess With the Zohan (2008), Sandy Wexler (2017), and You Are So Not Invited to My Bat Mitzvah (2023). Even in her nineties, Levine continued working, with roles in The Invisible Raptor (2023), Sacramento (2024), and Thelma (2024).

== Personal life and death ==
Levine was married to Bernard Levine until his death in 2003. They had three children together. She was also the founder of Actors Connection, established in 1991, which provided training and networking opportunities for aspiring performers.

Bunny Levine died in her sleep at her home in Tarzana, California, on August 20, 2026, at the age of 97.

== Filmography ==
=== Film ===
- Slime City (1988) – Ruby
- Cadillac Man (1990) – Woman Customer
- Taxman (1998) – Jury Foreman
- The Jimmy Show (2001) – Fireplace Woman
- A Very Serious Person (2006) – Mrs. Nadel
- Love Comes Lately (2007) – Max's Neighbor
- You Don't Mess With the Zohan (2008) – Older Lady in Salon
- Play the Game (2009) – Claire Cranston
- In My Sleep (2010) – Rachel
- Walk a Mile in My Pradas (2011) – Sister Betty
- Let Go (2011) – Mrs. Grossman
- A Thousand Words (2012) – Woman on Pier
- La La Land (2016) – Movie Theater Cashier
- Sandy Wexler (2017) – Sandy's Grandmother
- You Are So Not Invited to My Bat Mitzvah (2023) – Bella
- Love Virtually (2023) – Viv's Grandma
- The Invisible Raptor (2023) – Dorothy
- Sacramento (2024) – Mrs. Krenshaw
- Thelma (2024) – Mona
- Omi (2026) – Omi
- The Cure (2026) – Mrs. Polanski

=== Television ===
- Law & Order (1999) – Irene Drummond
- Everybody Loves Raymond (2003) – Hilda
- Gilmore Girls (2004) – Mrs. Thompson
- Ugly Betty (2007) – Mabel
- Private Practice (2007) – Old Lady
- Criminal Minds (2009) – Martha Woodley
- 2 Broke Girls (2011) – Mrs. Cohen / Helen
- Raising Hope (2011–2012) – Old Lady / Olivia
- New Girl (2013) – Shirley
- Southland (2013) – Old Woman
- The Mindy Project (2015) – Bryant's Grandmother
- Fuller House (2018) – Old Woman
- Shameless (2021) – Mrs. McCurdy
- Sprung (2022) - Natalie
