= Slime City =

1988 American comedy horror film

- Promotional release poster
- Directed by: Greg Lamberson
- Written by: Greg Lamberson
- Produced by: Peter J. Clark; Marc Makowski
- Starring: Robert Sabin; Mary Huner; Bunny Levine; Marilyn Oran
- Music by: Robert Tomaro
- Distributed by: Camp Video (VHS); Shock-O-Rama Horror Cinema (DVD); Media Blasters (Blu-ray)
- Release date: 1988
- Running time: 85 minutes
- Country: United States
- Language: English
- Budget: $100,000 USD

Slime City is a 1988 American science fiction comedy horror film written and directed by Greg Lamberson. It stars Robert C. Sabin, Mary Huner, Bunny Levine and Marilyn Oran.

In the film, an unmarried couple moves into a rundown apartment in New York City. The man accepts an offer of wine from his new neighbors, but the "wine" turns out to be a mysterious liquid. After drinking the "wine", the man starts shapeshifting into a slime creature.

== Plot ==
Alex and his girlfriend are looking for an apartment to move into. They then move into a rundown apartment in New York City. Their neighbor seduces Alex while his girlfriend is away. His neighbors provide him with a strange drink that they call "wine" and Alex proceeds to drink it.

After the incident, Alex begins to shapeshift into a yellow killer slime creature called "Zachary". He finds that the only way he can return to normal is to commit murder. His girlfriend must learn the secret of the apartment and the brutal massacre that took place centuries ago.

== Cast ==
- Robert C. Sabin as Alex Carmichael
- Mary Huner as Lori Swan / Nicole
- T.J. Merrick as Jerry Hunter
- Dennis Embry as Roman
- Dick Biel as Detective Irish O’Bannon
- Jane Doniger Reibel as Lizzy
- Bunny Levine as Ruby
- Marilyn Oran as Selina
- T. Clay Dickinson as Derelict
- Terry Spivey as Seaman
- Eva Lee as Heather Langley (Prostitute)
- Jamie Zozzaro as Tracy
- Allen Lewis Rickman as Horace
- Ivy J. Rosovsky as Rene
- Gary Stein as Mr. Swan
- Susan McCallum as Mrs. Swan
- Daniel Frye as Zachary Devon
- David Sanchez & Lloyd “Chip” Henry as Homeboys

== Production ==
Slime City was filmed in New York City, New York, on a budget of $100,000.

== Soundtrack ==
A soundtrack album featuring 40 minutes of instrumental music by Robert Tomaro was issued in 2008, to commemorate the 20th anniversary of the film's release. It features the bonus track "The Slime City Tribute Song" by Holy Mary Motor Club.

== Release ==
=== Theatrical ===
A midnight preview screening of Slime City was held in New York City in March 1988. The film premiered in New York City later that spring, and was originally slated for a three-week theatrical run. This three-week run was later extended, which producer Marc Makowski attributed to the film performing well at box office. Midnight screenings of the film were held at the Waverly Theater in Manhattan.

=== Home media ===
Slime City was released on VHS in the United States by Camp Video in 1989. In 1993, it was released in the United Kingdom by VIPCO, under the title The Slime.

On October 11, 2005, Slime City was released on DVD by Shock-O-Rama Horror Cinema, including such bonus features as a making-of featurette, the 1999 Lamberson-directed thriller film Naked Fear, and audio commentaries by Lamberson and Sabin for both films. In July 2009, Shock-O-Rama re-released Slime City and Naked Fear on DVD as a triple feature with another Lamberson-directed film, Undying Love (1991), as "Greg Lamberson's Slime City Grindhouse Collection".

In 2016, Slime City was released on Blu-ray as a double feature with its 2010 sequel Slime City Massacre.

== Reception ==
In 2005, Bill Gibron of DVD Talk criticized Slime City for its "failure to create a believable atmosphere of dread", and wrote, "There are not many laughs (but there are quite a few groans) in this oddly moody mess." He referred to it as "a kind of cult favorite", a distinction he felt is owed to the film's lack of availability and splatter elements, and wrote of the latter: "It's not at the level of a Troma title, or something as sensational as Evil Dead or The Thing, but what we get here is still handled well, with a nice combination of nastiness and invention."

== Sequel ==
In 2009, Lamberson directed the sequel Slime City Massacre, starring Debbie Rochon.
