= Sam Qualiana =

American filmmaker and actor (born 1986)

- Born: Samuel Joseph Qualiana; April 10, 1986 (age 39); Worcester, Massachusetts, U.S.
- Occupations: Filmmaker, actor
- Years active: 1998–present

Samuel Joseph Qualiana (born April 10, 1986) is an American filmmaker and actor who has been involved in many low-budget horror film productions, most notably the 2012 film Snow Shark.

== Life and career ==
Qualiana was born in Worcester, Massachusetts as the son of C. J. Qualiana, and has become known for directing, producing, and acting in various low budget horror films since 1998. His first appearance in a major film was an uncredited role in the 2006 Troma film Poultrygeist: Night of the Chicken Dead. In 2010 and 2011, he directed and starred in several short films, including Swamp Squad of the Dead and No Road Out. At the Buffalo Screams Horror Film Festival in 2010, Qualiana won the Filmmaker to Watch Award, and the following year, won the festival's Best Western New York Horror Short award for his film Something After Midnight.

He became more well-known during the production of his debut feature film, Snow Shark, which was filmed in 2011 and released in 2012. He served as the film's director, as well as one of its main actors and editors. The film was shot in Buffalo, New York and in Lockport, and was partially funded by an Indiegogo campaign launched by Qualiana with a fundraising goal of $3,000. The film premiered at Dipson's Amherst Theater in Buffalo on April 10, 2012. On May 12, the film made its film festival premiere when it was screened at the South Bronx Film Festival.

The second feature film directed by Qualiana was The Legend of Six Fingers, which was released in 2014. His third feature, Lake Effect, which began filming in Royalton, New York in early 2015, is currently in post-production. The film's title is a reference to the weather phenomenon known as lake-effect snow. The film was partially funded by an Indiegogo campaign with a flexible goal of $2,000. Production was challenged by temperamental weather conditions. One of the film's producers, Greg Lamberson, stated that the feature "will definitely be [Qualiana's] best film. It’s a scary story, and he’s really evolved as a director and a cinematographer." The film left the production stage in early 2016, and post-production visual effects has begun. As of February 2020, there have been no new updates on the film.

== Selected filmography ==
=== As director ===
- Swamp Squad of the Dead (2010 short)
- No Road Out (2010 short)
- Something After Midnight (2011 short)
- Norm/yle (2012 short)
- Snow Shark (2012)
- The Legend of Six Fingers (2014)
- Lake Effect (2016)
- Post Apocalyptic Commando Shark (2018)

=== As actor ===
- Poultrygeist: Night of the Chicken Dead (2006)
- Swamp Squad of the Dead (2010 short)
- No Road Out (2010 short)
- Zombie Babies (2011)
- Something After Midnight (2011 short)
- Porkchop II: Rise of the Rind (2011)
- Crimson: The Motion Picture (2011)
- Black Guy on a Rampage 3: Angel of Death (2011 short)
- Norm/yle (2012 short)
- Snow Shark (2012)
- Porkchop 3D (2012)
- Return to Nuke 'Em High Volume 1 (2013)
- The Legend of Six Fingers (2014)
- Within (2014)
- Killer Rack (2015)
- Lake Effect (2016)

== Awards and nominations ==
Year	Association	Category	Nominated work	Result	Ref.
2010	Buffalo Screams Horror Film Festival	Filmmaker to Watch Award	No Road Out	Won	
2011	Buffalo Screams Horror Film Festival	Best Western New York Horror Short	Something After Midnight	Won	
