= A Grim Becoming =

- Promotional release poster
- Directed by: Adam R. Steigert
- Written by: Janeen Avery; Christopher Brechtel; Mark Mendola; T.R. Smith; Adam R. Steigert
- Starring: Bill Oberst Jr. Jessica Cameron; Brandyn T. Williams; Michael Sciabarrasi
- Cinematography: Matthew A. Nardone
- Edited by: Christopher Burns Jr. Adam R. Steigert
- Production company: DefTone Pictures Studios
- Distributed by: DefTone Pictures Studios
- Release date: October 31, 2014
- Running time: 115 minutes
- Country: United States
- Language: English

A Grim Becoming is a 2014 American horror comedy film directed by Adam R. Steigert. The film had its world premiere on October 31, 2014, and stars Brandyn T. Williams as a young businessman that finds he has become a Grim Reaper. Including writing, production for A Grim Becoming took place over a two and a half year period, with filming taking place in New York during the summer of 2013.

== Synopsis ==
Raphael (Brandyn T. Williams) is an executive on the cusp of either making it big or losing it all, depending on how a deal with a large distribution company goes. His co-worker Wayne (Britt Griffith) would love to see Raphael fail so he can himself progress within the business, a situation that is made worse when Raphael must take time off of work to go to the funeral of a family member in Metzburgh. On his way to Metzburgh, Raphael witnesses a Grim Reaper claiming a soul and ends up becoming a Grim Reaper himself. Raphael now has to find out what he's willing to do to get this status reversed and what Death (Michael Sciabarrasi) himself has planned for him.

== Cast ==
- Brandyn T. Williams as Raphael (as Brandon Williams)
- Michael Sciabarrasi as Magoo / Death
- Bill Oberst Jr. as Phill Looney
- Britt Griffith as Wayne
- Jessica Cameron as Life
- Melantha Blackthorne as Meyrl Looney
- Devanny Pinn as Jamie
- Lynn Lowry as Mother
- Jason John Beebe as Vinny Gognitti

== Reception ==
A staff member for Horror-movies.ca gave an overly favorable review for A Grim Becoming, commenting that while there were issues with sound that they overall enjoyed the film and believed that it could become a cult classic. In contrast Nerdly panned the film, criticizing it for its "childish jokes" and "technical issues as well which destroy any redeeming qualities that this film might have had."
