= The Cemetery =

1877 Painting by Carl Fredrik Hill

- Kyrkogården (Swedish)
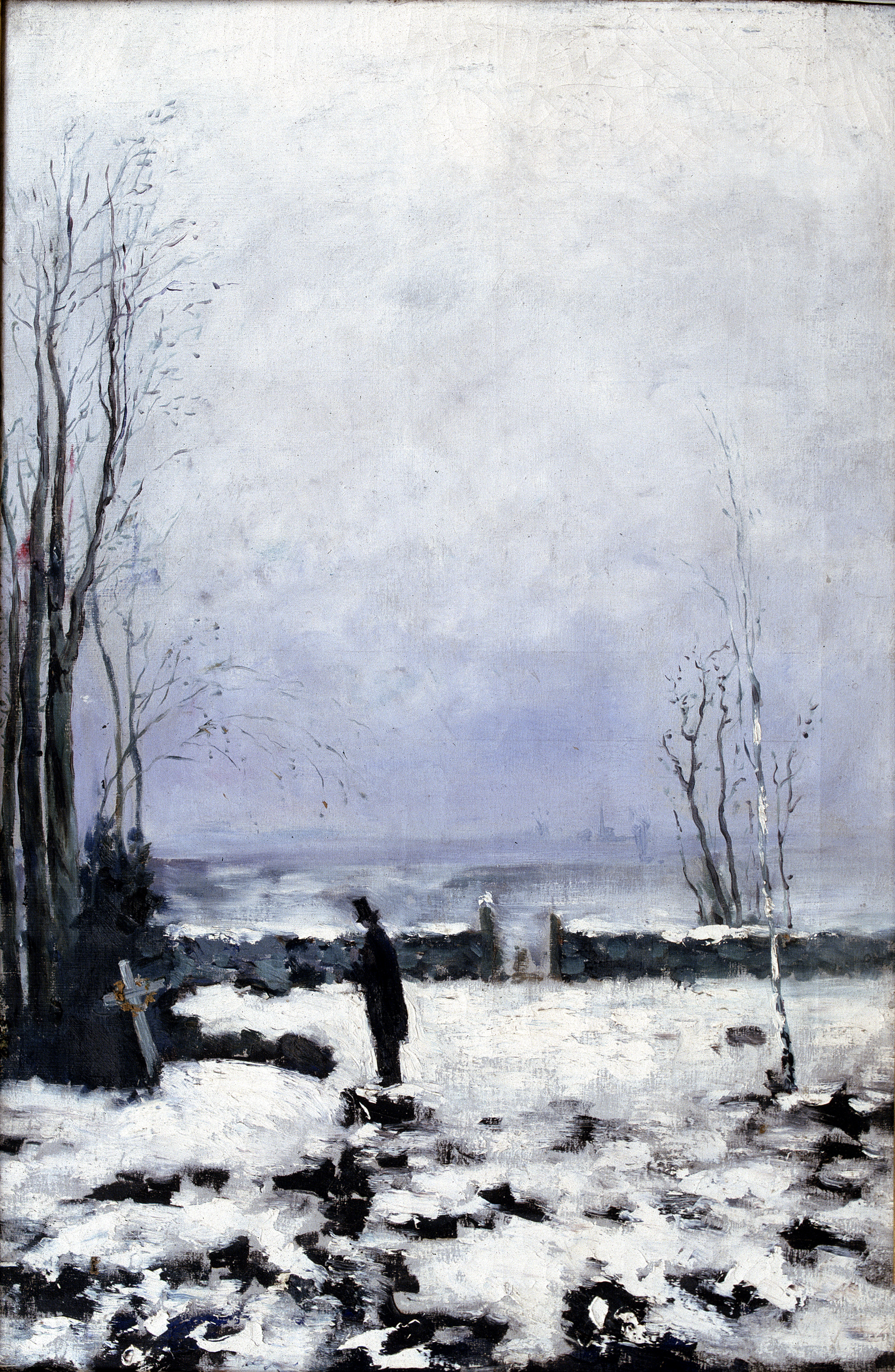
- Artist: Carl Fredrik Hill
- Year: 1877
- Location: Malmö Art Museum; Malmö

The Cemetery (in Swedish: Kyrkogården) is an 1877 painting by Swedish artist Carl Fredrik Hill. As of 2023, the painting is on display at the Malmö Art Museum in Sweden.

In the late fall of 1877 Hill suffered from a tense situation where he hovered between arrogance and deepest despair, and he suffered increasingly from schizophrenia. The contact with the outside world, with his comrades, became less and less. His studio door in Paris was shut. In his Christmas letters to his family in Sweden from 1877 Hill recounts the motifs that had occupied him, as well as those he wanted to paint in the future, including a cemetery with a man standing in front of a cross adorned with a wreath. Critic Reidar Ekner describes the figure as "extremely alone, isolated in the universe."

The painting was painted shortly before the artist's collapse and forcible hospitalization by his friends. It belonged to one of the 18 paintings that Hill wanted to show at the World exhibition in Paris in 1878.

== Impact ==
The painting reportedly inspired the poem "Portrait-Elegy 1977" by Swedish modernist poet Erik Lindegren.
