= Killer Rack =

- Promotional release poster
- Directed by: Greg Lamberson
- Written by: Paul McGinnis
- Starring: Jessica Zwolak; Debbie Rochon; Paul McGinnis; Michael Thurber; Lloyd Kaufman; Brooke Lewis; Sam Qualiana
- Cinematography: Chris Rados
- Edited by: Phil Gallo
- Music by: Armand Petri
- Production company: Slaughtered Lamb Productions
- Distributed by: Camp Motion Pictures
- Release date: September 11, 2015 (Scare-A-Con)
- Running time: 90 minutes
- Country: United States
- Language: English

Killer Rack is a 2015 American musical horror comedy film directed by Greg Lamberson and written by Paul McGinnis. The film, which was shot in Buffalo, New York, was screened at several film festivals, and profits from promotional stickers were donated to the Lynn Sage Foundation, a breast cancer organization.

== Plot ==
After insecure Betty Downer receives breast augmentation surgery from a surgeon named Cate Thulu, who worships the Elder Gods of writer H. P. Lovecraft's Cthulhu Mythos, her blood-thirsty new breasts seek world domination.

== Cast ==
- Jessica Zwolak as Betty Downer
- Debbie Rochon as Dr. Cate Thulu
- Paul McGinnis as Tim
- Michael Thurber as Mr. Raquel
- Lloyd Kaufman as Dr. Foin
- Brooke Lewis as the Killer Rack (voice)
- Sam Qualiana as "Dutch"

Roy Frumkes makes a cameo appearance.

== Production ==
The film was shot in Buffalo, New York. Make-up effects were created by Arick Szymecki and Stacey Book, while Brett Piper provided stop-motion animation, and chroma key compositing was used. Director Greg Lamberson stated that the film "is a movie for fans of practical effects, although we'll use CGI to enhance what we shot on set. Our DP, Chris Rados, had to do a lot of shooting behind plexiglass".

== Release and reception ==
The film premiered at the Scare-A-Con film festival on September 11, 2015, where it won best film, and played dozens of festivals thereafter, including many international, during which it took several awards including a Best Writer Award for Paul McGinnis. The film was released on DVD by Camp Motion Pictures on December 13, 2016.

Amy Seidman of ComingSoon.net called the film "a fun, no-brainer kind of flick". Scott Hallam of the website Dread Central wrote that "you have to overlook a lot of the low-budget pitfalls that often haunt a film like this, but it’s indeed worth looking past the blemishes of the movie to enjoy [its] humor and great spirit".
