= Legend of the Hillbilly Butcher =

- Directed by: Joaquin Montalvan
- Written by: Eunice Font; Joaquin Montalvan
- Starring: Paul E. Respass; Doreen Barnes; Allen East; S.E. Feinberg
- Cinematography: Joaquin Montalvan
- Edited by: Joaquin Montalvan
- Music by: Jay Dawg
- Production company: Sledgehammer Films
- Distributed by: Whacked Movies
- Release date: October 2013 (PollyGrind)
- Running time: 99 minutes
- Country: United States
- Language: English

Legend of the Hillbilly Butcher is a 2013 American horror film written and directed by Joaquin Montalvan. The film was released to DVD and VOD on 23 September 2014 and stars Paul E. Respass as a hillbilly with a taste for human flesh.

== Plot ==
Carl Henry Jessup is a hillbilly that has spent his days with his half sister Rae Lynn and best friend Billy Wayne. He's unhappy over the loss of his parents, who died in a murder-suicide, so he decides that he will plead with the demon Sam Bakoo to bring them back. However, as Carl has also spent much of his time indulging in cannibalism, his soul is not enough to appease Sam.

== Cast ==
- Paul E. Respass as Carl Henry Jessup
- Doreen Barnes as Mama Jessup
- Allen East as Sam Bakoo
- S.E. Feinberg as The Storyteller
- Theresa Holly as Rae Lynn
- Chris Shumway as Billy Wayne

== Reception ==
Critical reception for Legend Of The Hillbilly Butcher has been mixed. Ain't It Cool News praised the film for its "twisted imagery" and "the embrace of retro coolness by most of its cast", while DVD Talk commented that it would be a good rental film. Bloody Disgusting panned Legend Of The Hillbilly Butcher, commenting that while it "does an excellent job of establishing a Grindhouse look and feel that many low budget films fail to grasp", it "suffers with not fully embracing its concept, including its painfully slow pace."
