= Justyna Zwolak =

Polish-American applied mathematician

Justyna P. Zwolak is a Polish and American applied mathematician whose research applies machine learning to quantum computing, and particularly to the control theory, tuning, and state recognition of quantum dots. She works as a scientist at the National Institute of Standards and Technology, in its Applied and Computational Mathematics Division.

== Education and career ==
Zwolak was educated at Nicolaus Copernicus University in Toruń, where she received a master's degree in 2007 and completed her Ph.D. in 2011.

Next, she became a postdoctoral researcher in physics at Oregon State University from 2011 to 2014, in the STEM Transformation Institute of Florida International University from 2014 to 2017, and in the Institute for Advanced Computer Studies (UMIACS) Joint Center for Quantum of the University of Maryland, College Park from 2017 to 2019. In 2019 she joined the National Institute of Standards and Technology as a mathematician in its Applied and Computational Mathematics Division.

== Recognition ==
With Jacob Taylor of NIST, Zwolak received the Department of Commerce Bronze Medal in 2024 "for pioneering the field of machine learning for quantum control". She was the 2024 recipient of the Washington Academy of Sciences Excellence in Research Award, "for outstanding contributions in the application of machine learning to the control of systems at the frontiers of quantum science and technology".

She was a 2025 recipient of the Presidential Early Career Award for Scientists and Engineers, "for breakthrough research combining machine learning, computer vision, and physics-based heuristics to calibrate and control quantum systems".
