= Greg Lamberson =

American filmmaker and author (born 1964)

- Born: Gregory Lamberson; April 19, 1964 (age 62); Gowanda, New York, U.S.
- Occupations: Author, filmmaker
- Years active: 1984–present
- Spouse: Tamar Lamberson

Gregory Lamberson (born April 19, 1964) is an American filmmaker and author, and a member of the Producers Guild of America. He is known for writing novels such as Johnny Gruesome and the series The Jake Helman Files, and for directing the 1988 film Slime City. He is also the founding director of Amazing Fantasy Fest.

== Early life ==
Lamberson was born in Gowanda, New York and grew up in the nearby village of Fredonia.

== Career ==
Having studied filmmaking at the School of Visual Arts in Manhattan, his first appearance in a film was an uncredited role in the 1987 horror comedy I Was a Teenage Zombie. The next year, he directed and produced the cult film Slime City. In 1991, he wrote, directed, produced, and acted in the horror film Undying Love, and in 1999 did the same for the film Naked Fear.

Lamberson went on to produce various low-budget horror films, including several directed by Sam Qualiana, such as the 2012 film Snow Shark, the 2014 film The Legend of Six Fingers, and the horror film Lake Effect. He directed the 2013 horror film Dry Bones, as well as the 2015 horror comedy Killer Rack, both of which feature his daughter Kaelin in minor roles. In 2010, Lamberson directed Slime City Massacre, a semi-sequel to his feature directorial debut. In 2020 he wrote the screenplay for the fantasy western "Showdown in Yesteryear" and in 2023 he produced the Buffalo Bills Mafia comedy "Unbillievable".

Lamberson is also known for his novels. In 2002, he published Personal Demons the first of his series The Jake Helman Files, which features a former NYPD detective turned private investigator who encounters supernatural phenomena. He has since written and published five books in total in the series, with the most recent entry being Storm Demon in 2013. His 2007 novel Johnny Gruesome received several awards and nominations, including a nomination for the Superior Achievement in a Novel category in the 2009 Bram Stoker Awards.

== Personal life ==
On May 19, 1999, he married Tamar Lamberson, and the couple had a daughter named Kaelin.

== Selected filmography ==
=== As director ===
- Slime City (1988)
- Undying Love (1991)
- Naked Fear (1999)
- Slime City Massacre (2010)
- Dry Bones (2013)
- Killer Rack (2015)
- Johnny Gruesome (2018)
- Widow's Point (2019)
- Guns of Eden (2022)

=== As producer ===
- Slime City (1988)
- Undying Love (1991)
- West New York (1996)
- Naked Fear (1999)
- Gruesome (2007 short)
- Slime City Massacre (2010)
- Snow Shark (2012)
- Dry Bones (2013)
- Gave Up the Ghost (2014 short)
- The Legend of Six Fingers (2014)
- Killer Rack (2015)
- Model Hunger (2016)
- Lake Effect (2016)
- Model Hunger (2016)
- Unbillievable! (2023)

== Selected bibliography ==
- The Jake Helman Files
  - Personal Demons (2004)
  - Desperate Souls (2010)
  - Cosmic Forces (2011)
  - Tortured Spirits (2012)
  - Storm Demon (2013)
  - Human Monsters (2015)
- Johnny Gruesome (2007)
- The Frenzy Wolves
  - The Frenzy Way (2010)
  - The Frenzy War (2012)
- The Julian Year (2014)
- Black Creek (2016)
- Cheap Scares! Low Budget Horror Filmmakers Share Their Secrets (2008)

== Awards and nominations ==
=== Films ===
Year	Association	Category	Nominated work	Result	Ref.
2010	PollyGrind Film Festival	The Biggest Baddest Mother of the PollyGrind	Slime City Massacre	Won	
2016	Fantastic Cinema Festival	Grand Jury Award for Best Feature Film	Killer Rack	Nominated	

=== Novels ===
Year	Association	Category	Nominated work	Result	Ref.
2008	Black Quill Awards	Best Small Press Chill	Johnny Gruesome	Nominated	
2009	Independent Publisher Book Awards	IPPY Gold Medal Award for Horror	Johnny Gruesome	Won	
2009	Bram Stoker Awards	Superior Achievement in a Novel	Johnny Gruesome	Nominated	
