= Adam R. Steigert =

American filmmaker (born 1986)

Adam Richard Steigert
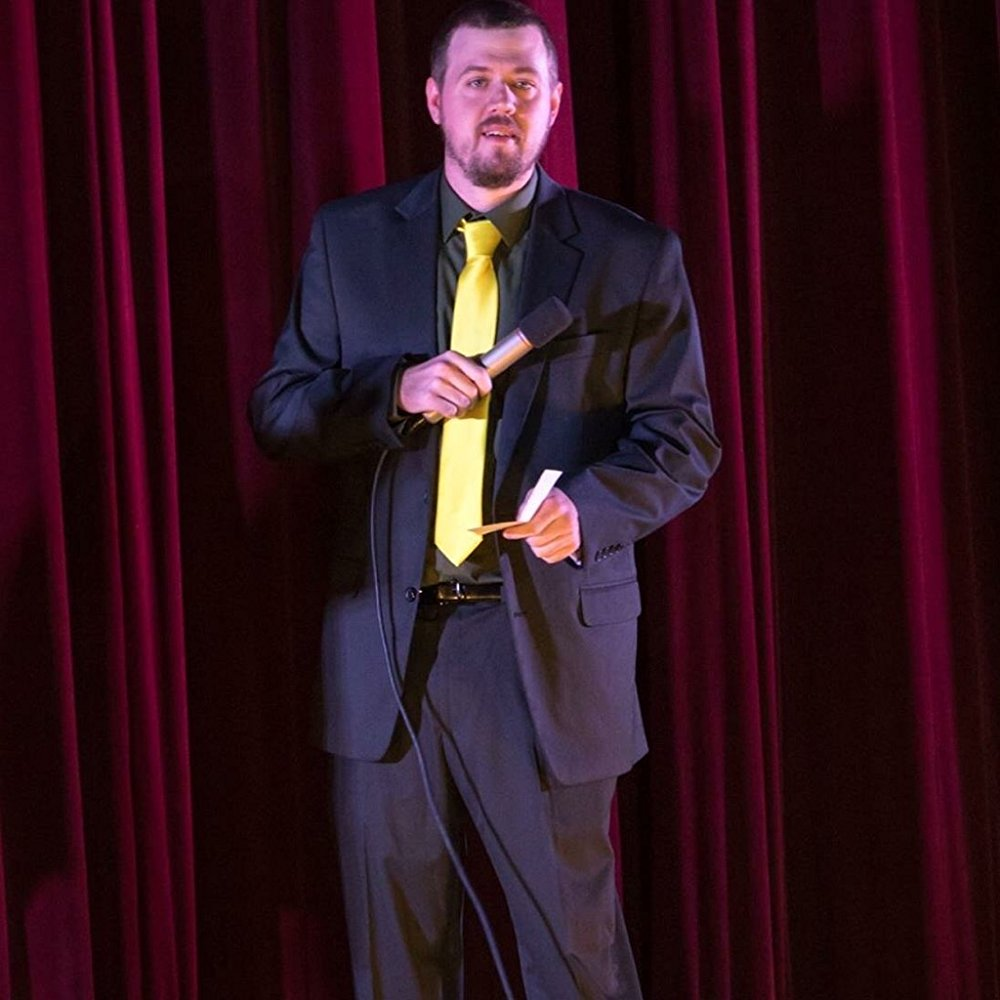
- Steigert at an event for his film STAR [Space Traveling Alien Reject] (April 2017)
- Born: December 31, 1986 (age 39); Hamburg, New York, U.S.
- Occupation: Filmmaker
- Years active: 2008–present

Adam Richard Steigert (born December 31, 1986) is an American filmmaker, known for his films OMBIS Alien Invasion, A Grim Becoming, Fang and The Horrific Evil Monsters. He co-founded the Buffalo-based production company 388 Studios in 2018.

== Life and career ==
Steigert was born in Hamburg, New York on December 31, 1986. His parents were Warren Richard Steigert and Jean M. Sanders, and he was raised by his grandparents, William and Kathleen Sanders. He formed the production company DefTone Pictures Studios with Stephanie Wlosinski, writing and directing the 2008 film Bitez and the 2009 film Gore. His most popular film involves zombies in Prisoners of the Dead. He later wrote, directed, and produced the short exploitation film Homicidal Vengeance. In 2013, Steigert wrote and directed the science fiction film Ombis: Alien Invasion, which was later re-titled in Best Buy, Walmart and Netflix as Not Human.

In 2014, Steigert directed, co-wrote, and co-edited the comedy horror film A Grim Becoming. Steigert then directed, co-wrote, and produced the 2017 film STAR [Space Traveling Alien Reject]. His next project, a werewolf-based horror film titled Fang, released in 2018. He then created a horror team up known as The Horrific Evil Monster.

After the release of The Horrific Evil Monsters, Steigert, under the direction of 388 Studios, produced and directed a spin-off series focusing on the Grim Reapers 9 to 5, entitled A Grim Mini Series: Final Fracture.

In 2021 Steigert began writing a sequel to his film OMBIS Alien Awakening.

== Selected filmography ==
- Bitez (2008), director and producer
- Gore (2009), director and producer
- Pigman vs. Gore (short) (2010), director and producer
- Prisoners of the Dead (2011), director and producer
- Ombis Alien Invasion (2013), director and producer
- To Release a Soul (short) (2013), director and producer
- Caged (short) (2013), director and producer
- A Grim Becoming (2014), director and producer
- The Making of A Grim Becoming (short) (2014), director and producer
- STAR (Space Traveling Alien Reject) (2017), director and producer
- Fang (2018), director and producer
- Homicidal Vengeance (2020), director and producer
- The Horrific Evil Monsters (2021), director and producer
- A Grim Mini Series: Final Fracture (2022), director and producer
