= Slime City Massacre =

2010 American comedy horror film

- Promotional release poster
- Directed by: Greg Lamberson
- Written by: Greg Lamberson
- Produced by: Greg Lamberson; Marc Makowski
- Starring: Jennifer Bihl; Kealan Patrick Burke; Debbie Rochon; Robert Sabin
- Music by: Mars
- Distributed by: Media Blasters (DVD/Blu-Ray)
- Release dates: February 18, 2010 (Beloit International Film Festival); March 17, 2010 (United States)
- Running time: 85 minutes
- Country: United States
- Language: English

Slime City Massacre is a 2010 American science fiction comedy horror film directed by Greg Lamberson and starring Jennifer Bihl, Kealan Patrick Burke, Debbie Rochon and Robert Sabin. It is a sequel to the 1988 film Slime City, also directed by Lamberson.Filmed at Central Terminal in Buffalo, NY.

== Plot ==
A dirty bomb has decimated New York City's financial district and reduced midtown to a post-apocalyptic nightmare. The neighborhood known as Slime City has been evacuated, except for the homeless, and in the ruins of a soup kitchen four squatters discover a supply of food that transforms them into hideous slimy creatures (like Zachary), driven to murder. Meanwhile, a greedy developer who has set his sights on Slime City hires a team of mercenaries to wipe out the creatures.

== Cast ==
- Jennifer Bihl as Alexa
- Kealan Patrick Burke as Cory
- Debbie Rochon as Alice
- Lee Perkins as Mason
- Robert C. Sabin as Zachary
- Brooke Lewis as Nicole
- Mary Bogle as Lori "Swan"
- Roy Frumkes as Ronald Crump
- Sephera Giron as Ruby
- Lloyd Kaufman as Special Disappearance

== Release ==
Slime City Massacre had its world premiere at the Beloit International Film Festival in Beloit, Wisconsin. The film was released on a special edition DVD by Media Blasters in 2011.
