= Malmö Art Museum =

Swedish art museum

- Malmö Konstmuseum (Swedish)
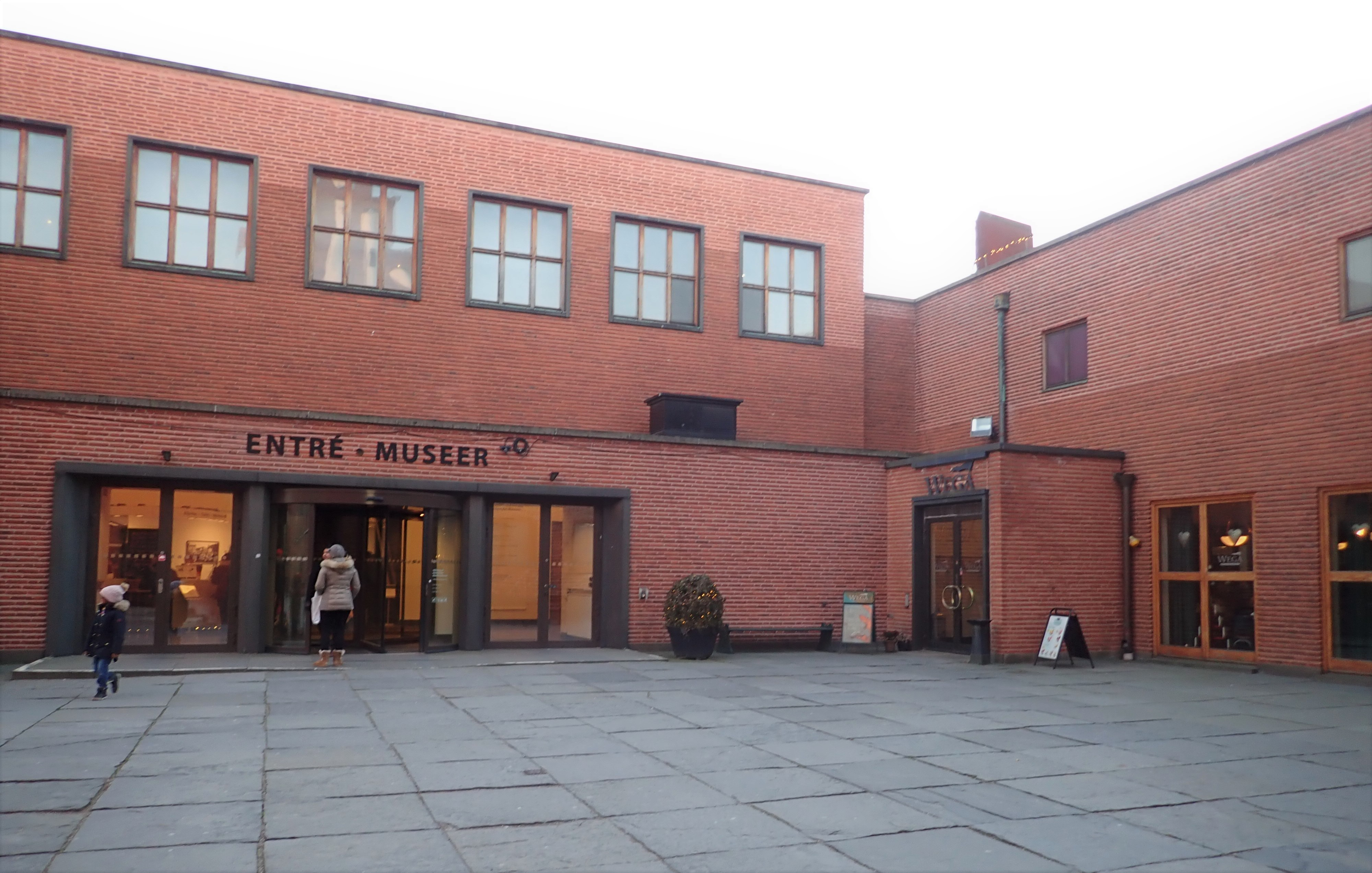
- Malmö Art Museum entrance
- Interactive fullscreen map
- Established: 1841
- Location: Malmö Castle, Malmö, Scania, Sweden
- Coordinates: 55°36′N 12°59′E
- Type: Art museum

The Malmö Art Museum (Swedish: Malmö Konstmuseum), founded in 1841 (185 years ago), is one of the leading art museums in Scandinavia. Located within the Malmö Castle complex in Malmö, Scania, southern Sweden, its current building dates to 1937. The museum is governed by the City of Malmö.

== The collections ==
The museum houses a major collections of Nordic modern and contemporary art, now containing about 40,000 works, covering the period from the 16th century to the present day.

The museum hosts several important collections and historical donations, including the works of Carl Fredrik Hill (1849–1911). The Herman Gotthardt Collection of Nordic modern 20th-century art is an important contribution to the understanding of the early production of Scandinavian modern art. Also in the museum's holdings is a unique collection of Russian fin-de-siècle paintings, acquired at the famous Baltic Exhibition in Malmö in 1914.

The museum has an extensive collection of furniture and handicraft, primarily from southern Sweden.

== Exhibitions ==
The permanent exhibition "From 1500 until Now" shows the historical development and the great variety in Sweden and north Europe of painting, sculpture and applied arts from the Renaissance through to Art Nouveau and up to the present day. It displays a selection of the finest artworks from the collection and interiors from the different periods of style.

Paintings in the collections

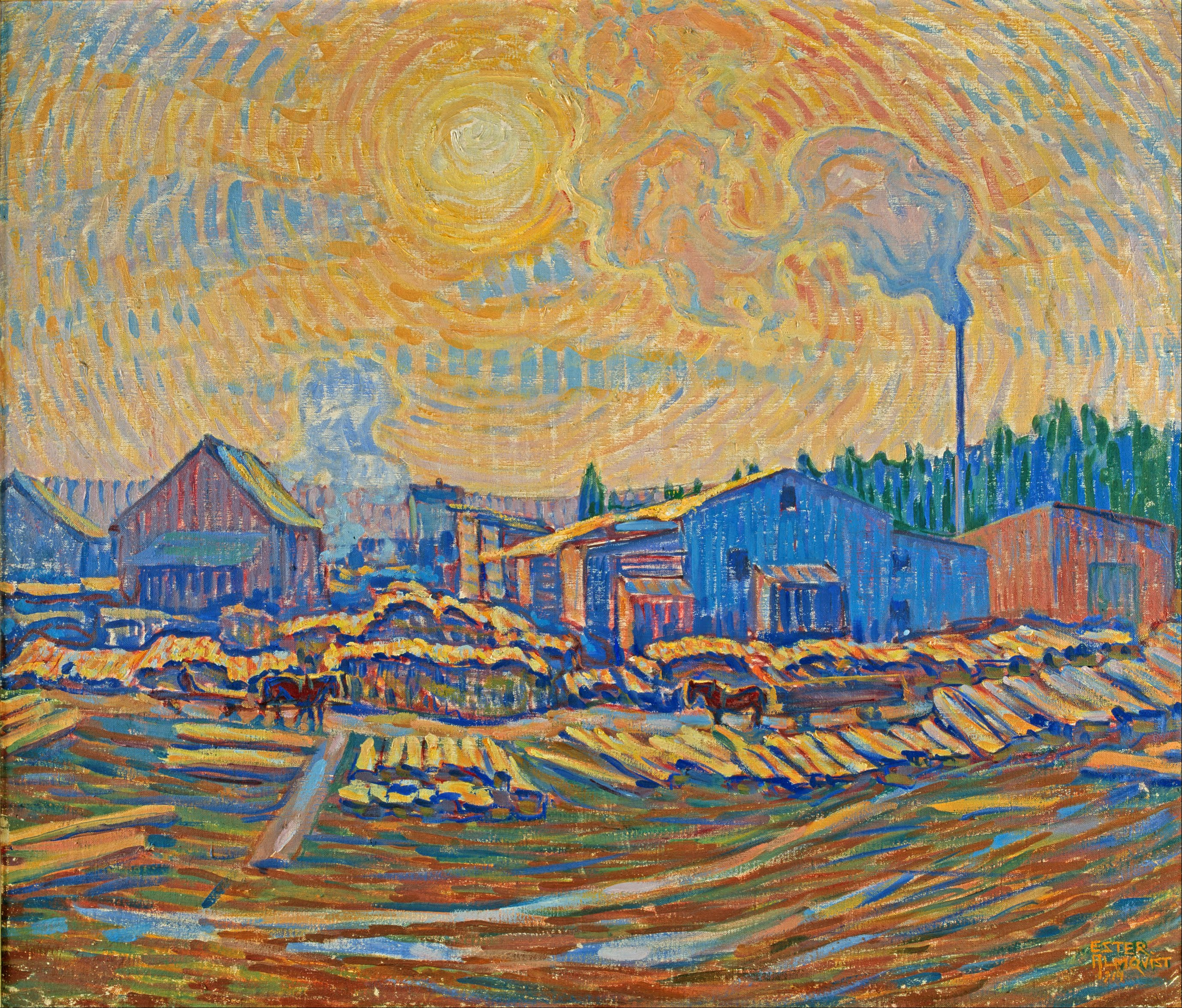
Ester Almqvist

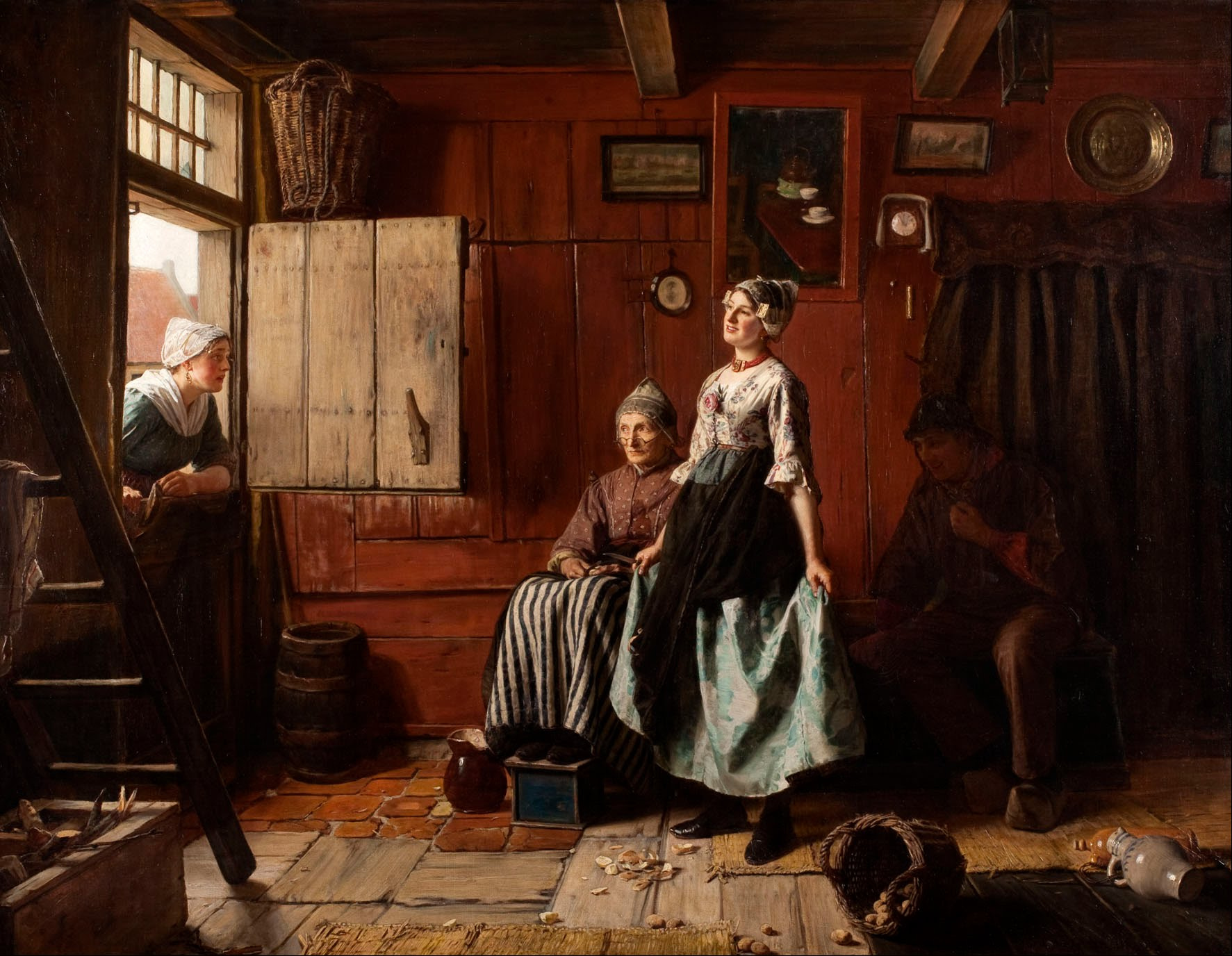
Ferdinand Fagerlin

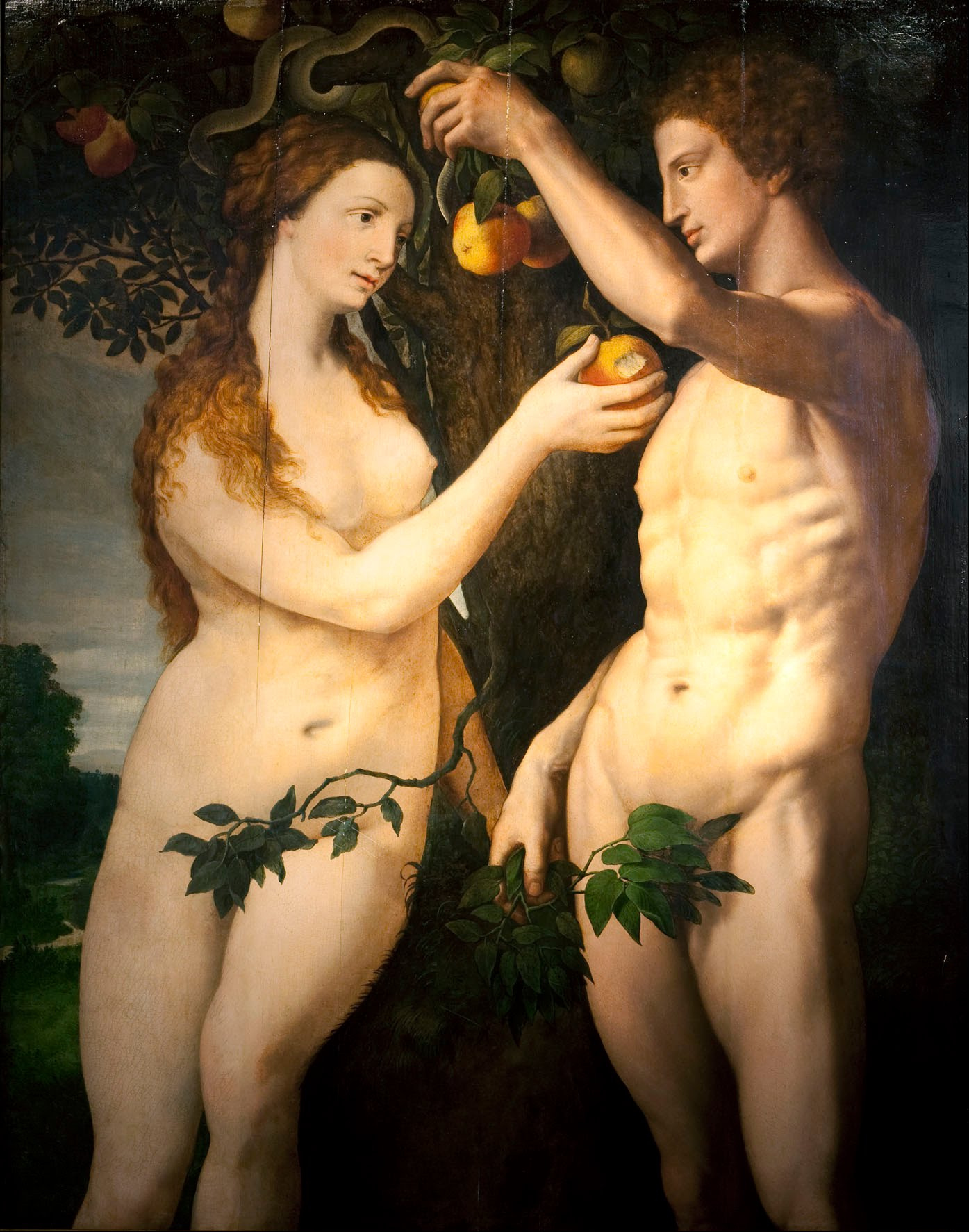
Frans Floris, The Fall of Man (circa 1560)

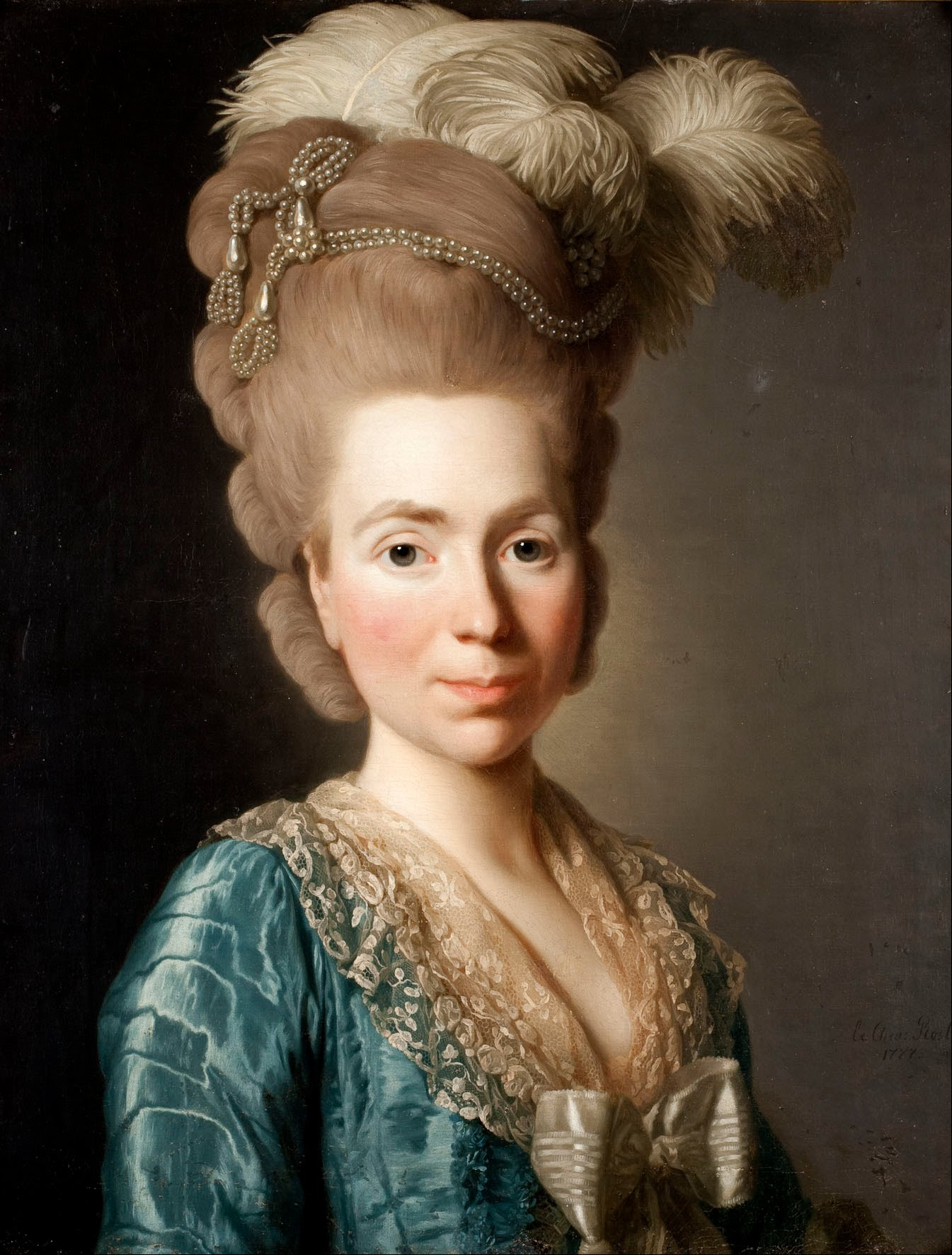
Alexander Roslin, Portrait of Princess Natalya Petrovna Galitzine (1977)

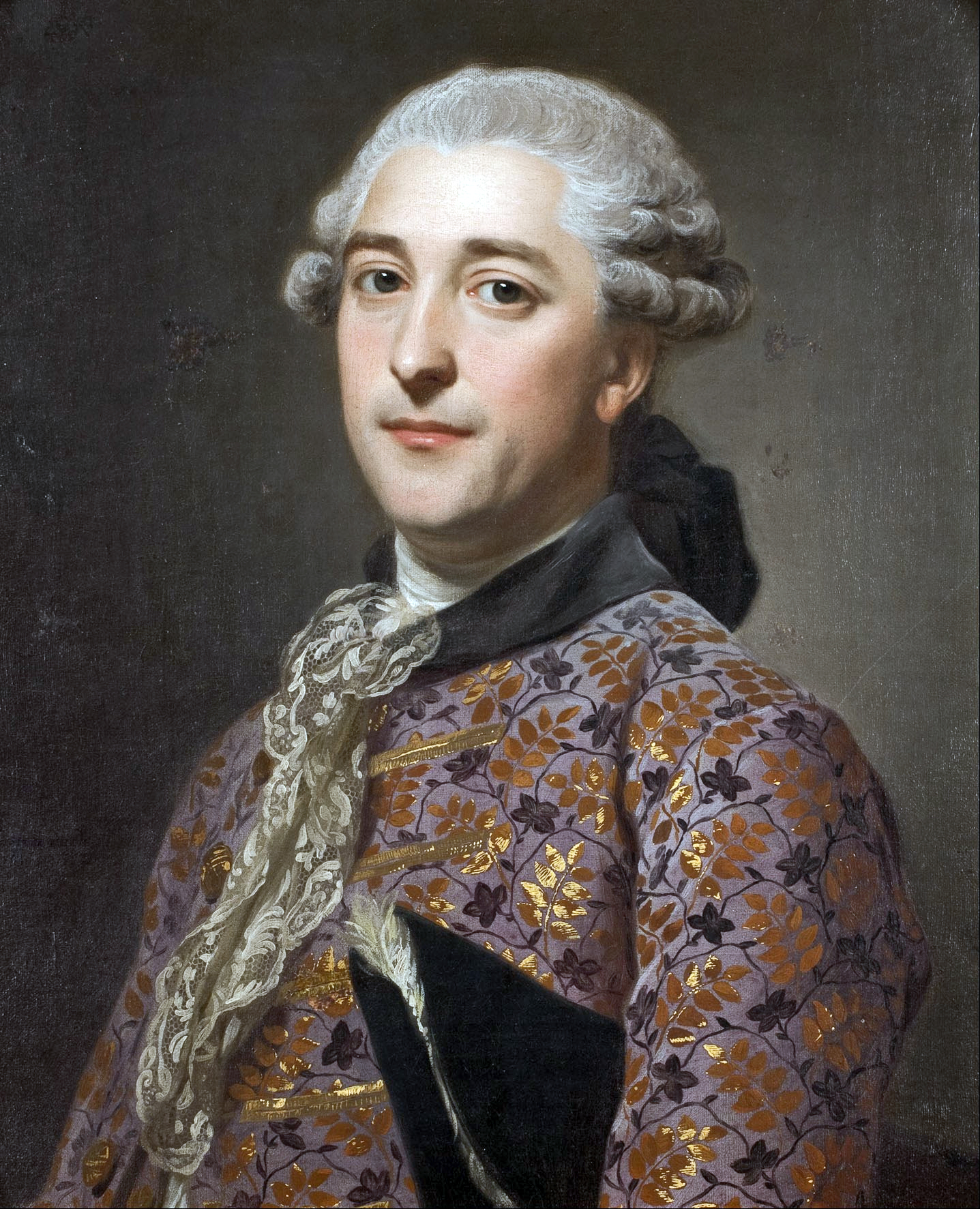
Alexander Roslin, Portrait of Prince Vladimir Golitsyn Borisovtj, 1762

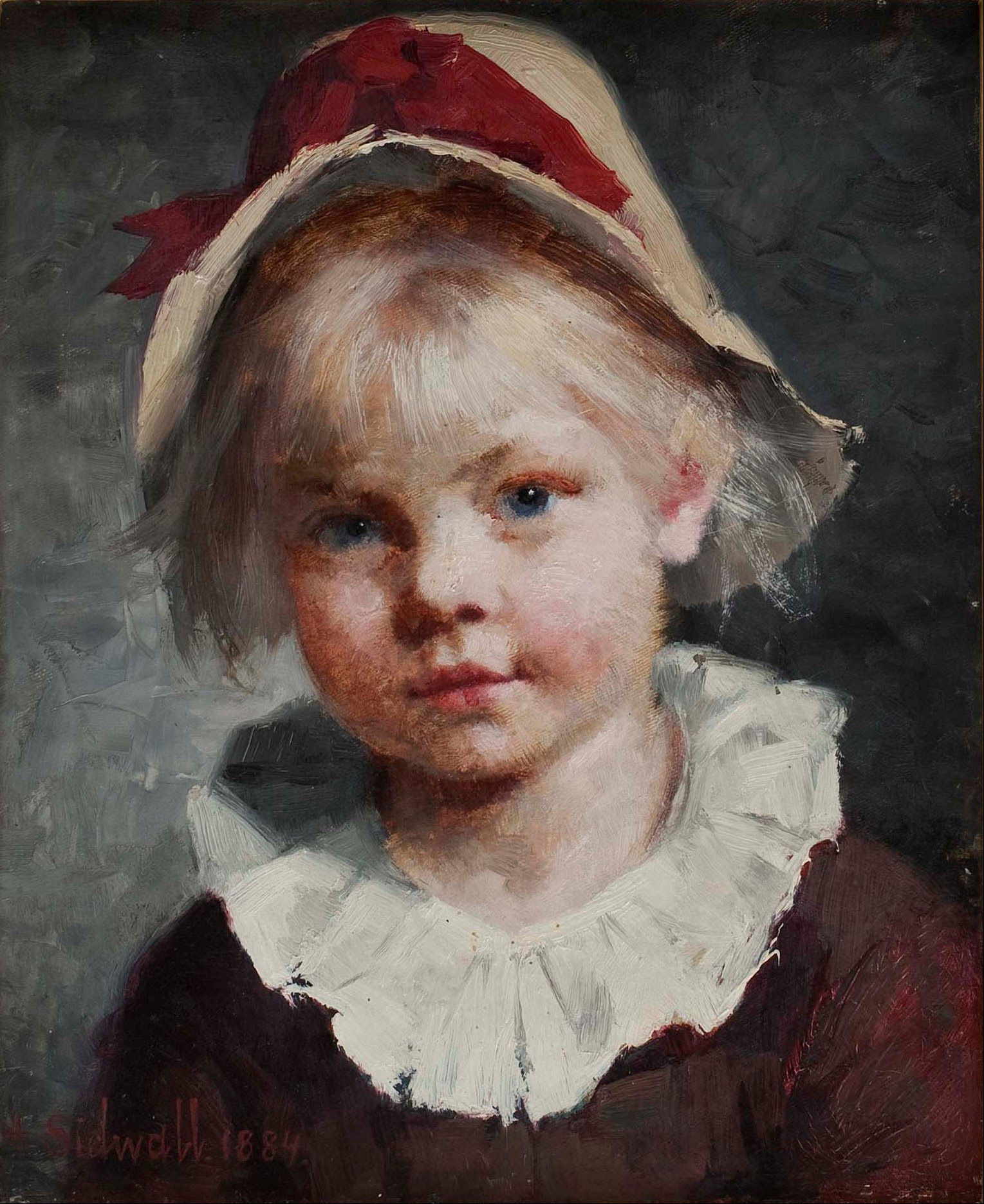
Amanda Sidvall, The thief of hearts (1884)

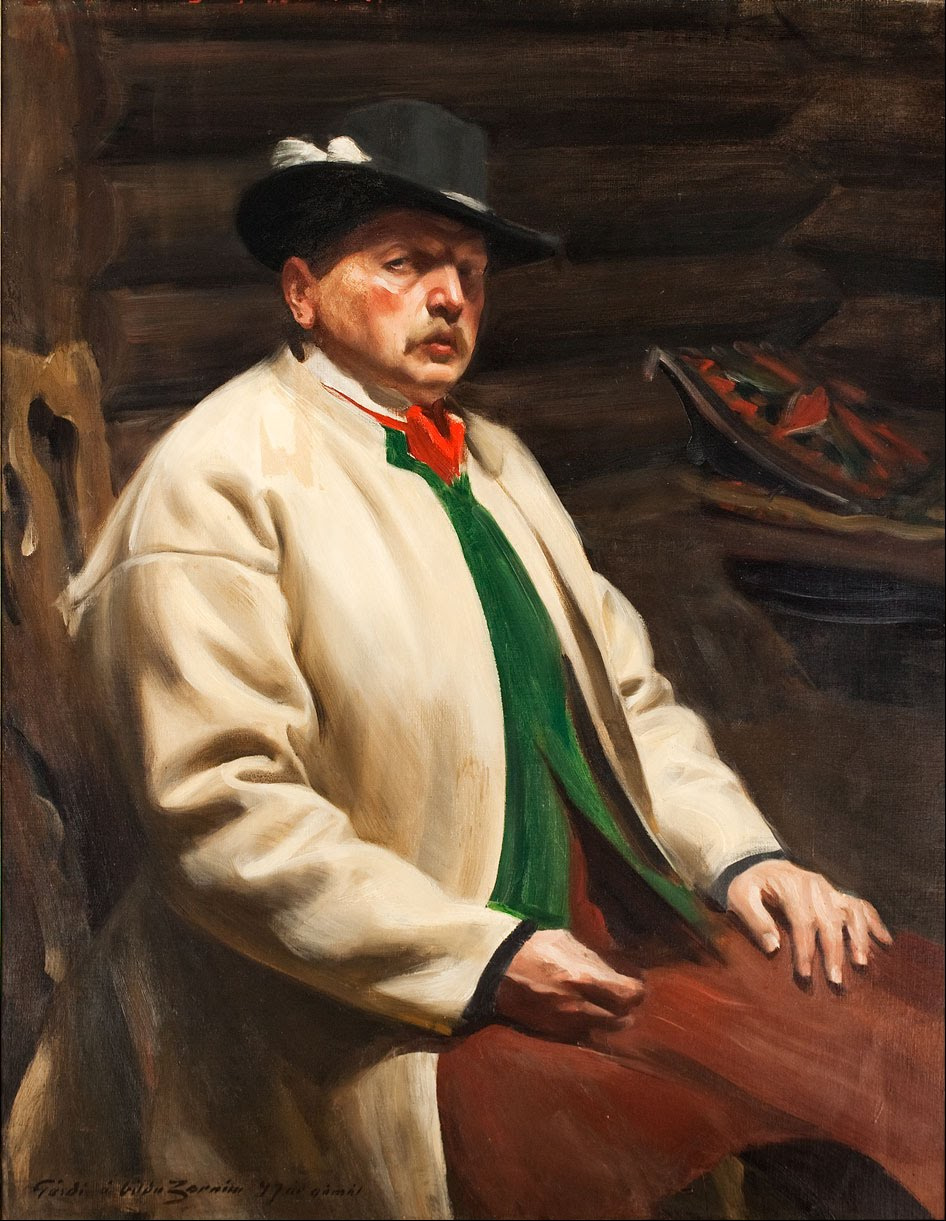
Anders Zorn, Selfportrait (1907)

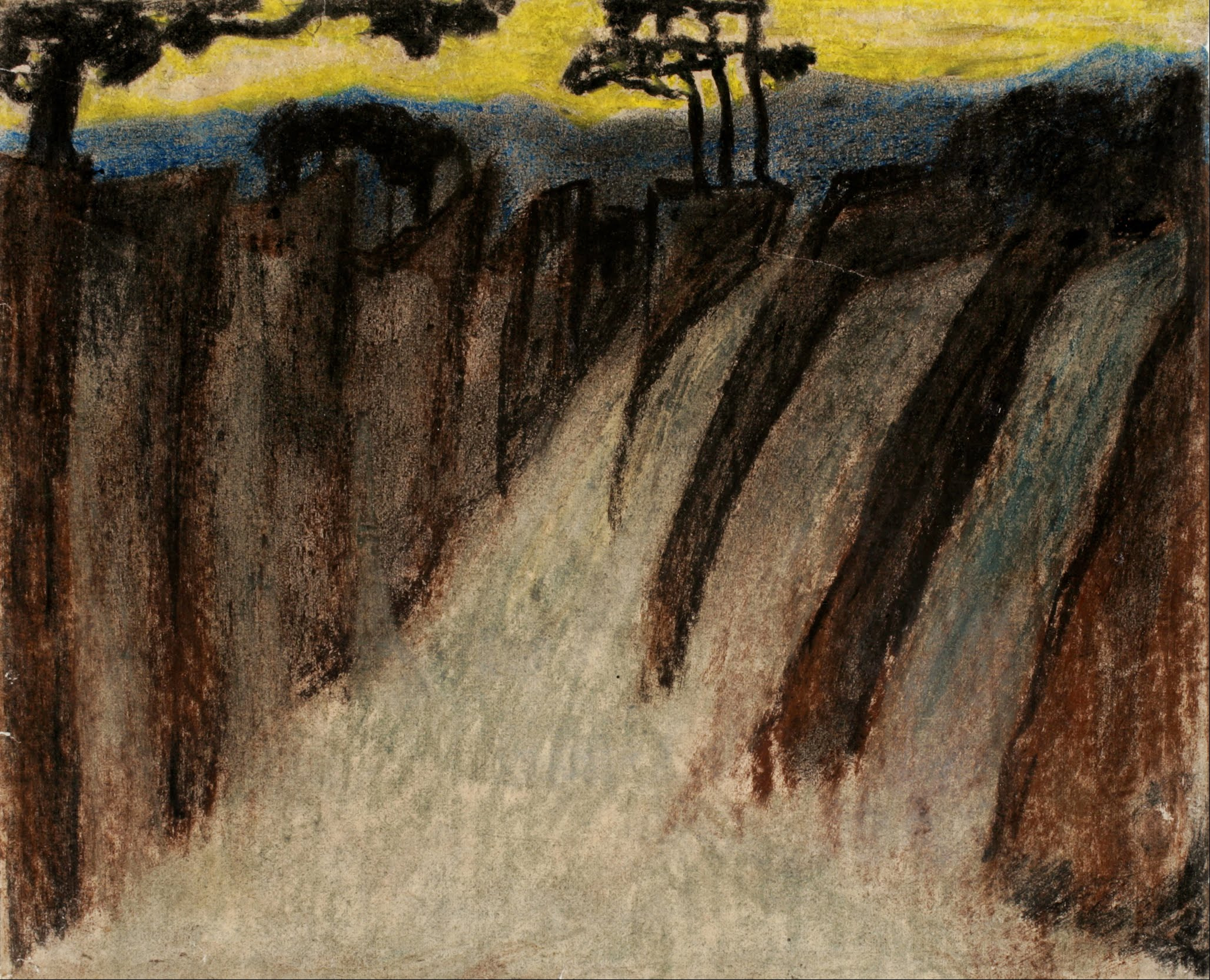
Carl Fredrik Hill, Untitled (twilight landscape)

Per Krafft the Younger, Portrait of Hedvig Sophia Runeberg

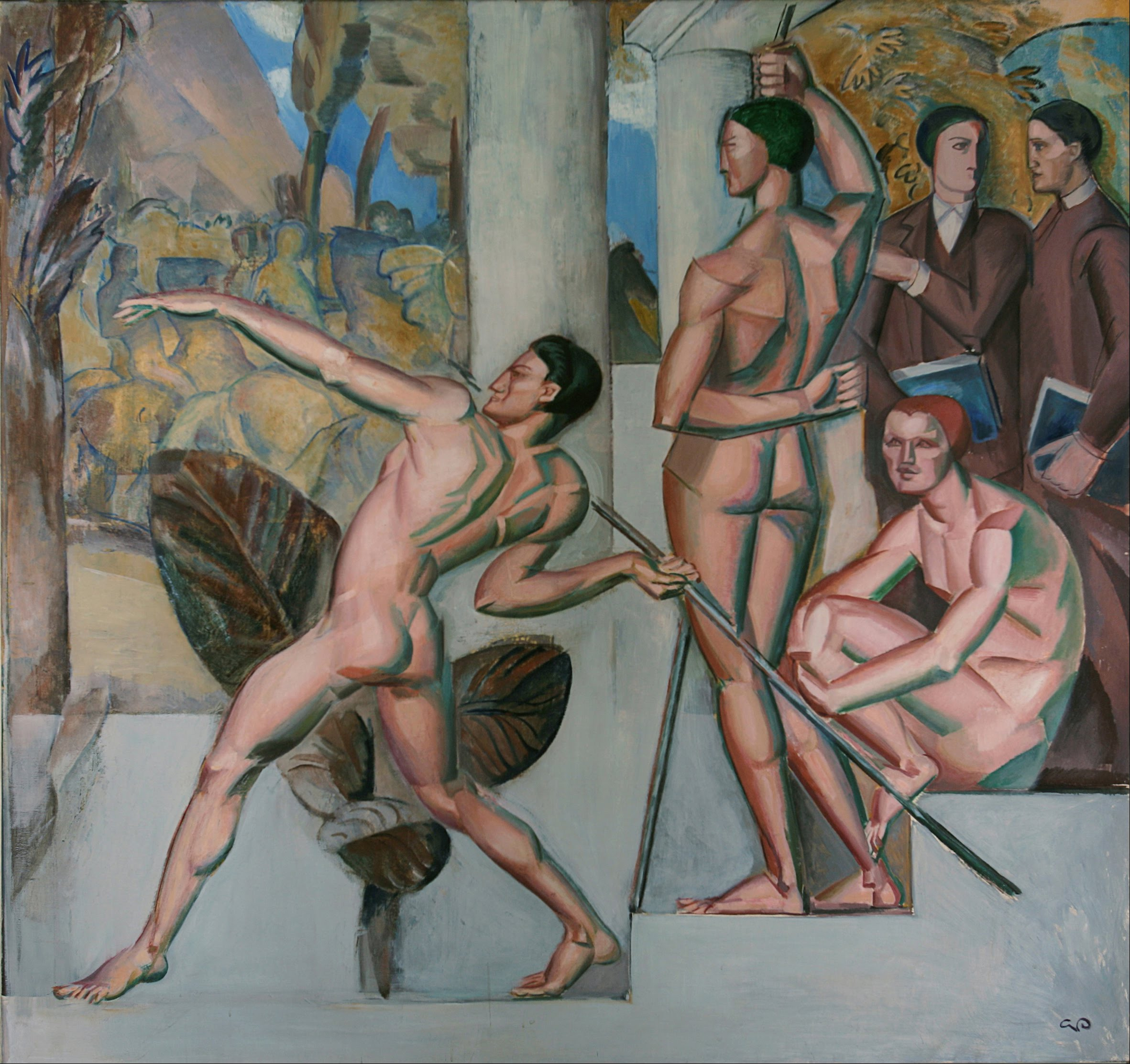
Georg Pauli, Mens sana in corpore sano (1912)
