= Dipson Theatres =

Movie theater chain based in Western New York

- Type: Private
- Founded: 1939; 87 years ago in Batavia, New York
- Founder: Nikitas Dipson
- Headquarters: Williamsville, New York, United States
- Number of locations: 8
- Key people: Michael Clement(President); Bryan Spokane(Vice President)
- Revenue: $2.93 to $5.43 million (estimated)
- Website: www.dipsontheatres.com

Dipson Theaters is an American movie theater chain based in Western New York. Dipson Theaters currently operates six theaters.

== History ==
Dipson Theatres, Inc. began in 1939 in Batavia, NY.

In 1939 Nikitas Dipson also moved into the Buffalo, NY region, acquiring three theaters Michael Shea operated but on which he had not renewed the leases: the Century, a downtown first run theater, the Bailey, a neighborhood theater, and the Riviera, a suburban theater and one on which Shea declined an offer: the Ridge, another suburban theater.

In 1946, Dipson Theatres, Inc. sued nine national film distributors (Vitagraph, Inc., Warner Bros. Pictures Distributing Corp, Loew's, Inc., Paramount Pictures, Inc., RKO Radio Pictures, Inc., Twentieth Century-Fox Film Corporation, Universal Film Exchanges, Inc., Columbia Pictures Corporation, and United Artists Corporation along with Buffalo Theatres, Inc. and its dissolved subsidiary Bison Theatres Corporation, and its president, McFaul) under an alleged violation of the Sherman Antitrust Act. The case was finally decided on July 25, 1951 by The United States Court of Appeals Second Circuit. Dipson claimed to have been conspired against, but failed to show it, except for Loew's and Paramount whom were found to legally able to favor their own theaters yet had provided adequately. The losses by Dipson were attributed mostly to poor management, unfair competition, and a decline in the neighborhood.

== Locations ==
=== Current Locations ===
- Amherst Theatre
- Capital Theatre 12
- Flix Stadium 10
- Lakewood Cinema 8
- McKinley 6 Theatres
- Transit Drive-In Theatre

=== Former Locations ===
- North Park Theatre – Lease was not renewed, June 6, 2013
- Batavia I & II – was for sale in January 2013, closed/sold in early 2013
- Jamestown, New York Dipson's Palace Theater, closed 1970s
- LeRoy, New York - operated 1940s-1975, closed 1976, now a church
- Bradfords Main Street Movie House
- Market Arcade Film & Arts Centre – since September 16, 2013
- West River Centre
- Eastern Hills Cinema - closed 2022
- Warren Mall Cinemas - sold February 2024 to Silver Star Cinemas
- Chautauqua Mall Cinema I & II - Closed 2023

Previously listed as locations but not listed on the company website (as of December 2013), may be former locations but do not appear to be:

- The Mall of America Theater – Operated by General Cinema until 2002, later AMC Theatres, now operated by the mall
- Twelve Oaks Mall Theater – demolished in 2002 for a new "Lifestyle Cafe" food court
