= Danny Lopes =

American actor and model (born 1982)

- Citizenship: American
- Occupation(s): Actor, model

Danny Lopes is an American actor and model.

He played the lead role of Bobby in Dante Tomaselli's film Desecration in 1999. Tomaselli cast Lopes for Horror, his second feature film, in 2002, which also stars Kreskin.

He earned his acting certificate from the New York Film Academy while continuing to work with Tomaselli on Satan's Playground with Ellen Sandweiss, Edwin Neal and Felissa Rose.

Lopes acted in an episode of Agents of S.H.I.E.L.D..

== Filmography ==
- Desecration (1999)
- Horror (2002)
- Satan's Playground (2006)
- Torture Chamber (2012)
- Co-Ed Confidential (2008) (as Guillermo in Season 1 Episode 11 - "I Don't")
