= 3rd Detroit Windsor International Film Festival =

Detroit Windsor International Film Festival
- Opening film: Eddie and the Alternate Universe
- Closing film: DWIFF Challenge Films
- Location: Detroit, Michigan, United States; Windsor, Ontario, Canada
- Hosted by: John Kelly, Shane Sevo
- No. of films: 80+
- Festival date: June 24, 2010 - June 24, 2010
- Language: International
- Website: www.dwiff.org

The 2010 Detroit Windsor International Film Festival was the third annual film festival held in Detroit, Michigan, United States and Windsor, Ontario, Canada. It ran from June 24, 2010 to June 27, 2010. The lineup consisted of eighty films shown as part of the DWIFF proper and many others as a part of MovingMedia. The selection included 32 shorts and 10 feature films. The festival was attended by members of the industry, press and general public. It opened with the world premiere of Eddie and the Alternate Universe, a film about a 10-year-old boy who is sent to an alternate reality by an eccentric neighborhood wizard and must fight to return to his world, and closed with the films submitted as part of the DWIFF Challenge.

== 2010 Award Winners ==
=== Best Feature ===
"Bilal's Stand" - Sultan Sharrief

=== Best Detroit Windsor Feature ===
"Annabelle and Bear" - Amy S Weber

=== Best Documentary ===
"Grown in Detroit" - Mascha & Manfred Poppenk

=== Best Detroit Windsor Documentary ===
"Regional Roots" - Carrie LeZotte

=== Best International Film ===
"Grown in Detroit" - Mascha & Manfred Poppenk

=== Best Detroit Windsor Children's Film ===
"Eddie and The Alternate Universe" - Samuel Lemberg

=== Best International Children's Film ===
"The Nickel" - Bill Reilly

=== Best Comedic Short ===
"Air Knob" Nathan Fleet

=== Best Short ===
"Qing Lou Nu" - Bryan Hopkins

=== Best Detroit Windsor Short ===
"Bare Witness" - Jeffery T. Schultz

=== DWIFF Challenge ===
==== First Place ====
Scallywag Entertainment, "The Fall of a Sparrow"

==== Second Place ====
Gillissie, "Fracture"

==== Third Place ====
Wing It, "You"

==== Honorable Mention ====
Group Therapy, "Walk Off"

==== Audience Choice ====
A&W Movies, "The Bitch is Back"

== Films Shown at the DWIFF ==
=== Animation ===
- H2oil - Animated Segments

=== Commercials ===
- NEC 'Make it happen'

=== Children's ===
- Chasing Mascots
- Eddie and the Alternate Universe
- Murphy's Short's
- The Nickel

=== Documentary ===
- Grown in Detroit
- H2oil - Animated Segments
- No Good Reason
- Regional Roots
- Resilience: Stories of Single Black Mothers
- The Mountain Music Project
- Tresor Berlin

=== Shorts ===
- 'Bare Witness'
- Across the Street
- Air Knob
- Arithmetic Lesson
- Boxed In
- Broken Fidelity
- Chickenfut
- Coping
- Council
- Deal Breaker
- Debt of the Heart
- Did You ...
- Double Talk
- Elusive Man
- Fantastic Glass Portrait
- Forbidden Fruit
- Free Lunch
- H2oil - Animated Segments
- Horst
- La Moustache
- Memoirs of a Blogger
- Osama Bin Latte
- Pink Slip
- Qing Lou Nu
- Relax Dude
- Sapsucker
- Televisnu
- Thank You, Mr. Patterson
- The Lost Food Shop
- The Window
- Thief
- too soon too late

=== Features ===
- Annabelle & Bear
- Bilal's Stand
- Blind Sided
- From A Place of Darkness
- I am Bish
- Ice Grill, USA
- Pizza With Bullets
- Starlight & Superfish
- The Art of Power
- The Crimson Mask

=== DWIFF Challenge ===
==== Teams Accepted for Judging and All Awards ====
These films met the following criteria; received on time, film could be played back / watched, all elements were present and accurate in submitted film, film was within the run-time limit, and there were not any obscene or pornographic scenes in the film. Films listed in order of team number assignment.

- 5, A&W Movies
- 9, T 130
- 11, Group Therapy
- 16, Wing it
- 17, Reel Temptations
- 18, Top Hat
- 19, Woodbridge
- 21, Reel Hood
- 22, A.G.e Industries
- 23, Gillissie
- 24, Scallywag
- 25, Motor City
- 28 LB Entertainment

==== Teams Accepted for Screening and Audience Choice Award ====
These films met the following criteria; received on time, film could be played back / watched, and there were not any obscene or pornographic scenes in the film. Films listed in order of team number assignment.

- 2, Krist10 Cartoons
- 14, Neon Complex
- 37, Independent

==== Teams Accepted for Screening ====
These films met the following criteria; film could be played back / watched, and there were not any obscene or pornographic scenes in the film.

- A-Team
- Team Channel 19
- Evolution Entertainment
- Afternoon Productions
- HFCC Film Club
- Troll Vision
- JML Productions
- Danse Paratus
- Phoenix Gilly Productions

== See also ==
- Detroit Windsor International Film Festival
- Ann Arbor Film Festival
- Toronto International Film Festival
- Windsor–Detroit International Freedom Festival
- Detroit–Windsor
