= Caesar and Otto's Deadly Xmas =

- Film poster
- Directed by: Dave Campfield
- Written by: Dave Campfield
- Produced by: Dave Campfield; Joe Randazzo
- Starring: Dave Campfield; Paul Chomicki; Felissa Rose; Deron Miller; Linnea Quigley; Lloyd Kaufman; Brinke Stevens; Joe Estevez
- Cinematography: Joey Rasool
- Edited by: Dave Campfield
- Music by: Bruce Kiesling
- Production company: Fourth Horizon Cinema
- Distributed by: Wild Eye Releasing
- Release dates: June 30, 2012 (Fright Night Film Fest); December 8, 2012 (United States)
- Running time: 84 minutes
- Country: United States
- Language: English

Caesar and Otto's Deadly Xmas is a 2012 American comedy-horror film. It stars Dave Campfield, Paul Chomicki, Felissa Rose, Deron Miller, Lloyd Kaufman, Linnea Quigley, Joe Estevez, Debbie Rochon, Brinke Stevens, Ken Macfarlane, and Avi K. Garg, as well as a cameo appearance by Robert Z'Dar. It is written and directed by Dave Campfield, the creator of the original Caesar and Otto film. The story is by Campfield and co-producer Joe Randazzo.

== Plot ==
Caesar Denovio and his half brother Otto Denovio take on duties as Santa and his elf. However, the bodies begin to pile up when a fellow store Santa develops a vendetta against them and he soon turns Caesar's list of Dinner guests into a list of Xmas-inspired victims!

== Cast ==
- Dave Campfield as Caesar Denovio
- Paul Chomicki as Otto Denovio
- Deron Miller as Demian
- Ken MacFarlane as Jerry
- Summer Ferguson as Allison
- Brinke Stevens as Sashi
- Scott Aguilar as Fred Denovio
- Avi K. Garg as Drew
- Samantha Barrios as Roberta Jenkins
- Neil Leeds as Neil
- Dawn Burdue as Babs
- Robin Ritter as Dr. Helen
- Shawn C. Phillips as Shawn
- Aaron Miller as Ozzy
- Mike Johansen as Dr. Feel
- Victoria Vertuga as Heather
- Linnea Quigley as Donna Blackstone
- Keith Bush as Chief of Police
- Joseph Orlando as Edwin Tyndale (credited as Joe Orlando)
- Ray Plumb as Stan Sullivan
- Derek Crabbe as Officer Winston
- Kevan Peterson as Charlie
- Davis Campbell as Dan Cobin
- Lauren Francesca as Lauren
- Lloyd Kaufman as Grandpa Denovio
- Joe Estevez as Joe
- Felissa Rose
- Debbie Rochon as Kara
- Devorah Lynne Dishington as Mother Superior
- Robert Z'Dar as Himself (uncredited)

== Release ==
The fifth in Campfield's Caesar and Otto series, the film premiered at the 2012 "Fright Night Film Fest" in Louisville, Kentucky on June 30, 2012. The film has gone on to receive awards and nominations at several film festivals.

The film was picked up for North American DVD distribution by "Wild Eye Releasing" and was released on November 19, 2013.

== Reception ==
Bloody Disgusting said, "it’s not bad and it’s not that great either – but for that sub sub sub sub genre it lies within, it is probably better than the majority of films it is surrounded by."

A contemporary review at HorroNews found that "This is a tiny film with a tiny budget that looks and feels like it cost much more than it actually did (there is even a nifty little animated sequence). Campfield once again wore numerous hats on the production and he too has grown as a filmmaker. His rapid fire editing technique during several sequences reminded me of the way Russ Meyer used to cut his films. The pacing is right where it needs to be and the films effects are used appropriately and humorously. "

A review at DVD talk stated " There's many callbacks to 80s horror movies, including perennial horror favorite Linnea Quigley as Caesar's agent and a flashback scene with Troma's Lloyd Kaufman as Caesar's grandfather, doing his own take on the grandfather in Silent Night, Deadly Night which explains why Caesar is still a little afraid of Santa Claus now. The production is a very low-budget affair, but those involved try to make that work for them rather than against them."

HorrorHound magazine stated in their issue 39 review of the film that "the budget is obviously low, but the filmmaking is brilliant."

== Series ==
- Caesar and Otto (2007)
- Caesar and Otto's Summer Camp Massacre (2009)
- Caesar and Otto in the House of Dracula (2009)
- Caesar and Otto meet Dracula's Lawyer (2010)
- Caesar and Otto's Deadly Christmas (2012)
- Caesar and Otto's Paranormal Halloween (2015)
