= Torture chamber (disambiguation) =

Torture chamber may refer to:

- Torture chamber, a place where torture is carried out
- Torture Chamber, a 2013 horror film by Dante Tomaselli
- "Torture Chamber," a song by Edan from his 2005 album Beauty and the Beat
