= Dark Fields (2009 film) =

- Directed by: Douglas Schulze
- Screenplay by: Kurt Eli Mayry; Douglas Schulze
- Story by: Mark C. Schwarz
- Produced by: Kurt Eli Mayry; Douglas Schulze
- Starring: David Carradine; Dee Wallace Stone; Richard Lynch; Ellen Sandweiss
- Cinematography: Lon Stratton
- Music by: David Bateman
- Distributed by: Barnholtz Entertainment; Entertainment One
- Release date: June 27, 2009 (DWIFF)
- Running time: 108 minutes
- Country: United States
- Language: English

Dark Fields (also Douglas Schulze's Dark Fields and The Rain) is a 2009 American horror film directed by Douglas Schulze, written by Kurt Eli Mayry and Douglas Schulze, and starring David Carradine, Dee Wallace Stone, Richard Lynch, Ellen Sandweiss, and Sasha Higgins.

== Plot ==
Cari Lumis, a college student, suddenly falls very ill. Panicked, she calls her parents, who tell her to return home. There, her parents reveal that her entire town has been cursed and demand that she sacrifice her younger brother to avoid an even worse curse. Cari initially goes along with her parents' wishes but rebels at the last second. The two siblings go on the run from the townspeople, who desperately try to find them. Meanwhile, flashbacks reveal intertwining tales of nineteenth century and mid-twentieth century families that attempt to deal with the same curse. Eventually, a demonic man shows up to collect on the debt owed by the town, and Cari is forced to confront him. After a series of cat and mouse games, a friendly dog appears and kills the demon.

== Cast ==
- Sasha Higgins as Cari Lumis
- David Carradine as Clive Jonis
- Richard Lynch as Karl Lumis / Mr. Jones
- Dee Wallace as Jean Applebe
- Ellen Sandweiss as Mandy

== Production ==
Dark Fields was shot in Michigan. Director Douglas Schulze was inspired by Shirley Jackson's short story "The Lottery" and Michael Cunningham's novel The Hours. David Carradine joined the film with the restriction that his scenes be filmed while he was available between shoots for other films. This was Carradine's second-to-last film before his death.

== Release ==
Dark Fields premiered at the Detroit Windsor International Film Festival on June 27, 2009. After it showed at the Hollywood Film Festival, it was picked up for distribution. Entertainment One released Dark Fields on DVD March 22, 2011.

== Reception ==
Annie Riordan of Brutal As Hell called it "a watered down version of 'The Lottery' that doesn't deserve its stars. Gordon Sullivan of DVD Verdict wrote that the film is too ambitious but is worth a rental for fans of the actors. Rod Lott of the Oklahoma Gazette called it a "fright-free horror movie".

Dark Fields won Best Michigan Film at the Detroit Windsor International Film Festival.
