= Macabre Faire Film Festival =

Film festival in Long Island, New York

Coordinates: 40.789576°N 73.134887°W

- Location: Long Island, New York, U.S.
- Language: International
- Website: http://www.twitchtwitchproductions.com/

The Macabre Faire Film Festival is a film festival held on Long Island, New York. The festival has featured judges and guests such as director Stevan Mena (Bereavement), Eileen Dietz (The Exorcist), Doug Jones (Hell Boy), Cleve Hall (Monster Man), Michael Gingold (Fangoria), Nick Nicholson (CNN Film Critic), Evan Ginzburg (Wrestler) and others.

== Awards ==
2013
Jury Award	Winner (Name/Film)		Nominee (Name/Film)	
Best Actor / Feature Film	Hector Kotsifakis	Reacciones adversas	Dave Campfield (Fourth Horizon Cinema)	Caesar and Otto's Deadly Xmas
Best Actress / Feature Film			Caitlyn Fletcher	Paranormal Captivity
Best Actress / Short Film			Tara-Nicole Azarian (Front Porch Film)	Sybling Rivalry
Best Screenplay / Feature Film	Roberto Lombardi, John Orrichio	Paranormal Captivity		
Best Cinematography / Feature Film		Sick: Survive the Night		
Audience Choice				
Best Short	Rob Dimension	No Clowning Around		
Audience Choice Award		Sick: Survive the Night		

2014
Jury Award	Winner (Name/Film)		Nominee (Name/Film)	
Best Actor / Feature Film	Ryan Kiser	Truth or Dare		
Best Actress / Short Film	Briana Rayner	Bruised	Anne Bobby	In Fear Of
Best Director / Short Film	Drew Dammron	Little Goat	Patricia Chica	Ceramic Tango
Best Director / Feature Film			Jessica Cameron	Truth or Dare
Best Screenplay / Feature Film			Jessica Cameron	Truth or Dare
Best Screenplay / Short Film	Charles Hall	Ceramic Tango		
Best Sound Design / Feature Film			Aaron M Lane	Truth or Dare
Best Editing / Feature Film			Aaron M Lane	Truth or Dare
Best Special Effects / Short Film	Amy-Leigh Poitras, Carolum Williams	Bruised		
Best Short Film	Drew Dammron	Little Goat	Patricia Chica	Ceramic Tango
Best Special Effects / Feature Film	Carrie Mercado	Truth or Dare		
Audience Choice
Best Soundtrack		Baggage		
Best Short		Baggage		
Macabreite Award
Best Actress / Feature	Tsveta Dimova	Seuls a Bord		
Best Cinematography / Short	John Honore	The Wretched Prologue		
Best Production Design	Patrick Devaney	Aemorraghe		
Honorable Mention	Patrick Devaney	Aemorraghe		
Best Horror Movie of the Year	Jon Keeyes	Nightmare Box		

2015

Best Supporting Actress - Mari Cielo Pajares - 666 Telemarketing
