= Desecration (disambiguation) =

Desecration is the act of depriving something of its sacred character.

Desecration may also refer to:

- Desecration (band), a Welsh death metal band
- Desecration (novel), the ninth book in the Left Behind series
- Desecration (film), a 1999 American horror film

== See also ==
- Desecrator (band), an English death metal band
