= Dave Campfield =

American film director

- Born: United States
- Occupations: Film director, screenwriter, producer, actor
- Notable work: Caesar and Otto's Paranormal Halloween

Dave Campfield is an American film director, producer, screenwriter, and actor. His productions include the comedy-horror film series Caesar and Otto (2009—2015). Several of his films are considered cult films.

== Life ==
Campfield is the director of several cult comedy horror films, including Caesar and Otto's Summer Camp Massacre and Caesar and Otto's Paranormal Halloween (featuring Deron Miller, Felissa Rose, Tiffany Shepis, Vernon Wells, Sean Whalen, Andre Gower, and Brinke Stevens) and horror thrillers such as Dark Chamber.

Campfield has won various awards at indie film festivals including the Outstanding Horror Comedy award at the 2015 Zed Fest Film Festival, Best Actor for Caesar and Otto's Deadly Christmas at the Horrific Film Festival of San Antonio, TX, and Best Screenplay at the Macabre Faire Film Festival of New York. He also hosted inravio.com's online program Nerdgasm from 2013 to 2014. Since 2019, he has been a regular contributor to Destinies—The Voice of Science Fiction's Film Review Team on WUSB (FM).

He is the director, writer and producer of Awaken the Reaper, which is co-produced by cinematographer Justin Paul for Fourth Horizon Cinema and Impact Media Productions and was filmed at Design Weapons Studios in New York.

== Filmography ==
=== As writer, director and actor ===
- Caesar and Otto's Paranormal Halloween (2015)
- Caesar and Otto's Deadly Xmas (2013), also actor
- Caesar and Otto meet Dracula's Lawyer (2013)
- Caesar and Otto in the House of Dracula (2011)
- Caesar and Otto's Summer Camp Massacre (2011)
- Caesar and Otto (2009)
- Dark Chamber (2006) also known as Under Surveillance, directorial debut

=== As actor only ===
- Escape from Kings Park (2014)
- The Perfect Candidate (2013)

=== As writer only ===
- Fortress of Sin
