= Corpses Are Forever =

- Directed by: Jose Prendes
- Written by: Jose Prendes
- Produced by: Jose Prendes; Alvaro Rangel; Jessica Lewis
- Starring: Richard Lynch; Brinke Stevens; Debbie Rochon; Linnea Quigley; Felissa Rose
- Cinematography: Alvaro Rangel
- Edited by: Brandon Dumlao
- Music by: Thomas Park; Jose Prendes
- Production company: C-47 Films
- Distributed by: The Asylum
- Release date: 2003
- Running time: 92 minutes
- Country: United States
- Language: English
- Budget: $200,000

Corpses Are Forever is a 2003 American horror spy film written and directed by Jose Prendes. It stars Prendes as an amnesiac spy who must recover his memories and uncover the origins of a zombie apocalypse. Alongside Prendes, the film's cast includes Richard Lynch, Brinke Stevens, Bill Perlach, Debbie Rochon, Linnea Quigley, and Don Calfa.

== Plot ==
During a zombie apocalypse, Malcolm Grant, a CIA agent, allows himself to be experimented on by a government lab run by General Morton. Morton believes the only way to stop the apocalypse is by wiping Grant's memories and injecting Grant with the experiences of Quint Barrow, the index case of the zombie plague. Through Grant's flashbacks as Barrow, they learn that the apocalypse was begun through a deal with Satan. Grant teams up with a priest, his ex-wife, and a nurse to stop doomsday.

== Cast ==
- Jose Prendes as Malcolm Grant / Quint Barrow
- Richard Lynch as General Morton
- Brinke Stevens as Dr. Emily Thesinger
- Bill Perlach as Father James Mason
- Debbie Rochon as Maguerite
- Linnea Quigley as Elli Kroger
- Don Calfa as Jack Stark

== Production ==
Corpses Are Forever was shot in Miami, Florida.

== Release ==
Prendes received a voicemail message from Lionsgate offering a distribution deal, but they unexpectedly pulled out. It was later released by The Asylum, with whom he developed a relationship.

== Reception ==
Bill Beyrer of Cinema Blend rated it 3.5/5 stars and wrote that he initially intended to write a sarcastic negative review, but the film turned out to be better than expected. Mike Watt of Film Threat rated it 3/5 stars and wrote, "It's a gutsy movie; it just doesn't work." In The Zombie Movie Encyclopedia, Volume 2, Peter Dendle wrote that the film is "unburdened by any sort of budget or clarity of vision".
