= Zombiegeddon =

- Directed by: Chris Watson
- Written by: Chris Watson; Andrew J. Rausch
- Produced by: Andrew J. Rausch; Chris Watson
- Starring: Ari Bavel; Paul Darrigo; Felissa Rose; Edwin Neal; Linnea Quigley; Tom Savini; Uwe Boll
- Cinematography: Damon Abraham; Jim Siebert
- Edited by: Damon Abraham; Sean Cain
- Distributed by: Troma Entertainment
- Release date: July 12, 2003
- Running time: 82 minutes
- Country: United States
- Language: English
- Budget: $10,000

Zombiegeddon is a 2003 American horror comedy film directed by Chris Watson. It stars Ari Bavel, Paul Darrigo, Felissa Rose, Edwin Neal, Linnea Quigley, Tom Savini, and Uwe Boll. It was distributed by Troma Entertainment, It was released to DVD on July 11, 2006.

== Plot ==
Satan has created a human-like race called zombies. When the zombies begin taking over the world, dirty cops Jeff and Cage find themselves in the unenviable position of stopping them before it's too late. Jeff soon learns that he alone has the power to defeat them if he's up to the task. As the body count piles up and internal affairs officers investigate Jeff and Cage for their prior wrongdoings, time is running out.

== Cast ==
- Felissa Rose as Melissa
- Edwin Neal as God
- Tom Savini as Jesus Christ
- Joe Estevez as Brooks
- Jeff Dylan Graham as Harper
- Linnea Quigley as Principal Russo
- Uwe Boll as Himself
- William Smith as Lord Zombie
- Brinke Stevens as Laura Reynolds
- Lloyd Kaufman as Bill
- Robert Z'Dar as Detective Bobby Romero
- Conrad Brooks as Dean Martinson
- Trent Haaga as Ted Kopafeel
- Jeff Burr as Phil (voice)
- Joe Fleishaker as Caller #1 (voice)
- Ron Jeremy as Todd (voice)
- Julie Strain as Dispatcher (voice)
- Fred Olen Ray as Fred (voice)
