= Satan's Playground =

- Theatrical film poster
- Directed by: Dante Tomaselli
- Written by: Dante Tomaselli
- Produced by: Milka Stanisic; Anthony J. Vorhies
- Starring: Felissa Rose; Ellen Sandweiss; Edwin Neal; Irma St. Paule; Danny Lopes; Christie Sanford; Salvatore Paul Piro; Danny Lopes; Ron Millkie
- Cinematography: Timothy Naylor
- Edited by: Marcus Bonilla; Egon Kirincic
- Music by: Perry Geyer; Will Grega; Bill Lacey; Kenneth Lampl; Dante Tomaselli
- Production companies: Em and Me Productions
- Distributed by: Anchor Bay Entertainment
- Release date: August 22, 2006
- Running time: 90 minutes
- Country: United States
- Language: English
- Budget: $500,000

Satan's Playground, also known as Chemistry, is a 2006 American horror film directed and written by Dante Tomaselli. The film stars Felissa Rose, Ellen Sandweiss, and Edwin Neal.

This was Sandweiss' first film appearance since 1981's The Evil Dead, and was the first time Tomaselli did not serve as the producer of his own film.

== Plot ==
Donna (Felissa Rose) and Frank (Salvatore Paul Piro) Bruno have decided to take a trip into the Pine Barrens with their autistic son Sean (Danny Lopes), new mother Paula (Ellen Sandweiss), and her baby Anthony (Marco Rose). When their car breaks down in the middle of the forest, Frank goes off to find help and comes across the house of Mrs. Leeds (Irma St. Paule), a palm reader that lives there with her mute daughter Judy (Christie Sanford) and her son. Mrs. Leeds rushes him into the house, insisting that the Jersey Devil lives in the forest. However, despite her concern, it soon becomes apparent that her family is just as dangerous when Judy murders Frank.

One by one, the people remaining in the car go out to search for their lost family members. Donna goes off in search of Frank and is assaulted and captured by the Leeds. Sean wanders off and gets lost in the woods. Paula initially tries to stay in the car and keep her baby safe, but inevitably leaves the car to investigate a police cruiser. However, rather than containing help, it contains the corpse of an officer killed by the Jersey Devil. When she returns to the car, she finds that Anthony has been taken. She goes off in search of him, which takes her to the Leeds house, where she's killed by the Leeds. Sean eventually makes it to the Leeds house, where he is given a palm reading and then sent back into the night and then sucked underground by what appears to be quicksand. This leaves only Donna alive, who manages to escape by bribing the Leeds son with diazepam. She eventually makes it to safety and wakes up in a hospital bed, where she is told that the Leeds house has been abandoned for years. Donna manages to persuade the police to check out the Leeds house in the hopes of finding Anthony, only for the Leeds to murder the police officer accompanying her. Terrified, Donna flees the house and tries to once again make it to safety, but is then killed by the Jersey Devil.

== Cast ==
- Felissa Rose as Donna Bruno
- Ellen Sandweiss as Paula
- Edwin Neal as Leeds Boy
- Irma St. Paule as Mrs. Leeds
- Danny Lopes as Sean Bruno
- Christie Sanford as Judy Leeds
- Ron Millkie as Officer Peters
- Salvatore Paul Piro as Frank Bruno
- Raine Brown as Prostitute
- Robert Zappalorti as Cop
- Marco Rose as Baby Anthony
- Maureen Tomaselli as Reporter
- Jessy Hodges as Lost Teen
- Chris Farabaugh as Stoner
- Garth Johnson as Red Hooded Man

== Reception ==
The film holds a rating of 67% on Rotten Tomatoes, based on 6 reviews, with an average rating of 6.30/10. Variety gave the film a positive review, calling it a "richly atmospheric exercise in surreal horror" and noted that while it was more accessible than some of the director's previous films, it still would not appeal to all viewers. JoBlo.com and Slant Magazine both praised the film, and JoBlo's reviewer noted that the movie was "a relentless and uber entertaining circus of horror." Dread Central's review was more mixed, praising the film's look as "polished" while criticizing the film's acting and non-linear story line.
