= Horror (2002 film) =

- DVD cover
- Directed by: Dante Tomaselli
- Written by: Dante Tomaselli
- Produced by: Dante Tomaselli
- Starring: Kreskin; Lizzy Mahon; Danny Lopes
- Cinematography: Tim Naylor
- Edited by: Marcus Bonilla
- Music by: Dante Tomaselli
- Production company: Elite Entertainment
- Release date: 2002
- Running time: 77 minutes
- Country: United States
- Language: English

Horror is a 2002 American horror film written and directed by Dante Tomaselli. The movie stars Danny Lopes as the leader of a gang of drug addicts that have made a bloody escape from a drug rehabilitation hospital, only to encounter demonic entities.

== Plot ==
A gang of teens escape a drug rehabilitation hospital after committing murder and grand theft auto, led by a man named Luck (Danny Lopes). They drive to a rendezvous point with the demented Reverend Salo (Kreskin) and his depraved wife (Christie Sanford) and their daughter Grace (Lizzy Mahon), who is a GUNWO-addicted slave. When the teens show up, they encounter demonic entities.

== Cast ==
- Kreskin as Reverend Salo
- Lizzy Mahon as Grace Salo
- Danny Lopes as Luck
- Vincent Lamberti as Reverend Salo Jr.
- Christie Sanford as Mrs. Salo
- Jessica Pagan as Marisa
- Raine Brown as Amanda
- Kevin Kenny as Kevin
- Chris Farabaugh as Fred
- Felissa Rose as Art Therapist

== Reception ==
DVD Verdict called it "a distinctive, compelling and occasionally brilliant work". Scott Weinberg commented that the movie would not likely appeal to people who predominantly viewed mainstream horror films but that "those with some patience and a taste for something small and different will certainly earn some solid creeps from this one." Film Threat also gave Horror a positive review and praised the film's pacing, as they felt that this enabled Tomaselli to build up the movie's "creepy suspense". In contrast, AMC'S FilmCritic panned the movie, commenting that "Horror has plenty of scary moments, but it’s so confusing it’s hard to be genuinely frightened."

=== Awards ===
- Best Cinematography at the New York City Horror Film Festival (2002, won)
