= The Cemetery Club =

1993 American film by Bill Duke

- Theatrical release poster
- Directed by: Bill Duke
- Written by: Ivan Menchell
- Produced by: Howard Hurst; David Brown; Sophie Hurst; Philip Rose; Bonnie Palef
- Starring: Ellen Burstyn; Olympia Dukakis; Diane Ladd; Danny Aiello; Lainie Kazan; Christina Ricci
- Cinematography: Steven Poster
- Edited by: John Carter
- Music by: Elmer Bernstein
- Production company: Touchstone Pictures
- Distributed by: Buena Vista Pictures Distribution
- Release date: February 3, 1993
- Running time: 107 minutes
- Country: United States
- Language: English
- Box office: $6,011,745

The Cemetery Club is a 1993 American comedy film directed by Bill Duke. The film stars Olympia Dukakis, Ellen Burstyn, Diane Ladd and Danny Aiello. Jerry Orbach and Lee Richardson appear in a brief prologue sequence.

== Plot ==
Based on the play by Ivan Menchell, this comedy-drama concerns three friends, Doris, Lucille, and Esther. All three live in the same Jewish community in Pittsburgh, are in their mid-to-late 50s, and have become widows within the past few years. Once a week, they gather to visit their husbands' graves and meet at a deli afterward to talk about their lives.

Doris remains fiercely devoted to her late husband and takes her responsibilities as a widow seriously. Lucille is eager to get her feet back in the waters of dating, partly as revenge against her late husband, who often cheated on her, and partly because she's very lonely by herself. Esther is also not used to being alone after 39 years of marriage, but she doesn't feel ready to start dating again, at least not until she meets Ben, a former cop turned cab driver who gradually but firmly eases his way into her life.

Doris is appalled when she discovers that Esther is dating again and loudly protests that she's being disrespectful to her late husband, while Lucille is more than a bit jealous that Esther snagged a good man before she could. All of which comes to fruition at the wedding of their friend Selma.

== Cast ==
- Ellen Burstyn as Esther Moskowitz
- Olympia Dukakis as Doris Silverman
- Diane Ladd as Lucille Rubin
- Danny Aiello as Ben Katz
- Lainie Kazan as Selma
- Jeff Howell as Paul
- Christina Ricci as Jessica
- Bernie Casey as John
- Wallace Shawn as Larry
- Stephen Pearlman as Rabbi
- Hy Anzell as Al
- Robert Costanzo as Morty
- Irma St. Paule as Theresa
- Bingo O'Malley as Judge
- Catherine Keener as Gail Moskowitz
- Jerry Orbach as Jake Rubin
- Lee Richardson as Murry Moskowitz

== Reception ==
On review aggregator website Rotten Tomatoes, the film holds an approval rating of 57% based on 7 reviews, with an average rating of 6/10.

Roger Ebert of Chicago Sun-Times said:

The movie has a serious undertone, lightened from time to time by scenes that don't quite seem to fit, as if the revisions were designed to lighten the mood of an essentially thoughtful piece. Still, I liked it, partly because of the honesty of the love story, as Aiello struggles with issues we can hardly guess about. And I enjoyed the life-affirming counterpoint of Selma, the much-married character played by Lainie Kazan, who seems to be a golddigger but comes through with some sound and sensible advice for Burstyn.
