= Camp Dread =

- Release poster
- Directed by: Harrison Smith
- Written by: Harrison Smith
- Starring: Eric Roberts; Danielle Harris
- Release date: April 15, 2014
- Country: United States
- Language: English

Camp Dread is a 2014 American horror film written and directed by Harrison Smith and starring Eric Roberts and Danielle Harris.

== Cast ==
- Eric Roberts as Julian Barrett
- Danielle Harris as Sheriff Donlyn Eldridge
- Felissa Rose as Rachel Steele
- Joe Raffa as Novak

== Release ==
The film was released on DVD on April 15, 2014.
