= Who Do I Gotta Kill? =

1992 American film by Frank Rainone

- Directed by: Frank Rainone
- Written by: James Lorinz; Frank Rainone; Rocco Simonelli
- Cinematography: Adam Kimmel
- Edited by: Michelle Gorchow
- Music by: Doug Katsaros
- Release date: 1994
- Running time: 84 minutes (UK DVD version); 86 minutes (U.S.)
- Country: United States

Who Do I Gotta Kill? (also known as Me & the Mob) is a 1994 comedy film directed and co-written by Frank Rainone with James Lorinz and Rocco Simonelli also writing. The film stars Sandra Bullock, John Costelloe, Steve Buscemi, and James Lorinz.

== Plot ==
Jimmy Corona is a struggling writer who takes a job with the mob to make ends meet. His mobster uncle, Tony, agrees to get him into the mob, but unexpected changes occur due to his inability to adapt to the mob.

== Cast ==
- Sandra Bullock as Lori
- Sandy Colosimo as Agency Receptionist
- John Costelloe as "Bink-Bink" Borelli
- Tony Darrow as Tony Bando
- Lori Rachal as Jogger
- Ted Sorel as George Stelloris
- Louis Giovannetti as Dick
- Steve Buscemi as Fred, Conspiracy Nut
- Stephen Lee as Bobby Blitzer
- Suze Trevithick as Girl At George's Bar
- Frank Aquilino as Joey "Clams" Tantillo
- John 'Cha Cha' Ciarcia as Marty "No-Neck" Scalia
- James Lorinz as Jimmy Corona
- Johnny Lorinz as Detective
- Lee Anne Linfante as Tina
- Nicholas Spina as Water Department Inspector
- Victor Triola as Exiting Patron
- Mario Cantone as Rico
- Frankie Cee as Franco
- Richard Bright as Belcher
- Michael Luciano as Leary
- Vickie Weinstein as Publisher's Secretary
- Roy Frumkes as The Publisher
- Mary Lynn Hetsko as Nurse
- Nellie Zastawna as Bingo Winner
- Irma St. Paule as Woman With Knitting Needle
- Frances Levy as Woman Negotiating
- Arthur J. Nascarella as Distraught Wiseguy
- Vincent Pastore as "Birdman" Badamo

== See also ==
- 1994 in film
