= Richard Lynch =

American actor (1940–2012)

- Born: Richard Hugh Lynch; February 12, 1940; Brooklyn, New York City, U.S.
- Died: June 19, 2012 (aged 72); Yucca Valley, California, U.S.
- Other name: Richard H. Lynch
- Education: The Actors Studio, HB Studio
- Occupation: Actor
- Years active: 1967–2012
- Spouse(s): Béatrix Lynch (divorced); Lily Lynch
- Children: 1
- Relatives: Barry Lynch (brother)
- Awards: Saturn Award for Best Supporting Actor (1982)

Richard Lynch (February 12, 1940 – June 19, 2012) was an American actor best known for portraying villains in films and television.

His film credits included Scarecrow, The Seven-Ups (both 1973), God Told Me To (1976), The Sword and the Sorcerer (1982), Invasion U.S.A. (1985), Little Nikita, Bad Dreams (both 1988), Puppet Master III: Toulon's Revenge (1991), and Halloween (2007). He appeared as Wolfe in the 1978 science fiction TV series Battlestar Galactica, and appeared again in its sequel series Galactica 1980, as Commander Xaviar. Lynch's other TV roles included Starsky & Hutch, Baretta, T. J. Hooker, Blue Thunder, Airwolf, The A-Team, The Fall Guy, Charmed, Vega$, Murder, She Wrote, and Star Trek: The Next Generation.

== Early life and career ==
Richard Hugh Lynch was born on February 12, 1940 (sometimes incorrectly cited as 1936) in Brooklyn, New York City to Catholic parents of Irish descent. Richard Lynch served in the United States Marine Corps for four years.

Lynch's distinct scarred appearance made him a popular nemesis, and he can be seen in more than 160 film and television performances. The scars came from a 1967 incident in New York's Central Park in which, under the influence of drugs, he set himself on fire, burning more than 70% of his body. He spent a year in recovery, gave up drug use and ultimately began training at The Actors Studio and at the HB Studio. In 1970, he co-starred with Robert De Niro, Sally Kirkland and Diane Ladd in the short-lived off-Broadway play One Night Stands of a Noisy Passenger, written by Shelley Winters. He often played a villain in features, including Scarecrow, which marked his film debut, The Seven-Ups, Bad Dreams, The Sword and the Sorcerer, and Little Nikita.

In 1982, Lynch won a Saturn Award for Best Supporting Actor for his performance as the evil King Cromwell in The Sword and the Sorcerer. Although Richard Lynch is best known for playing villains, he was cast as the president of the United States in the 2007 film Mil Mascaras vs. the Aztec Mummy. Lynch starred alongside Judson Scott in the 1982 short-lived science fiction TV series The Phoenix.

In addition to acting, Lynch was a musician, and he played the saxophone, guitar, piano, and flute. He held Irish citizenship through his Irish-born parents and was a frequent visitor to Ireland. He starred together with brother Barry in the films Nightforce and Total Force. Lynch's wife Lily starred with him in the film Breaking the Silence (1998) and son Christopher Lynch appeared with him in the science fiction film Trancers II. In 1977, Richard Lynch shared the stage with actor Al Pacino, a close friend, in the Broadway play The Basic Training of Pavlo Hummel. Lynch played a Vietnam veteran who used a wheelchair.

Through the years, Lynch worked with friend and colleague Don Calfa in the films Necronomicon (1993), Toughguy (1995), Corpses Are Forever (2003), and Lewisburg (2009).

== Later life and death ==
Lynch married twice — once to Béatrix Lynch (their son Christopher died in 2005 from pneumonia), and later to Lily Lynch.

Lynch's body was found in his home in Yucca Valley, California on June 19, 2012. It is not known if Lynch died on June 18 or June 19. After not having heard from Lynch for several days, friend and actress Carol Vogel went to his home to find the door open and his body in his kitchen. The cause of death was given as a heart attack. He was survived by his brother Barry and two sisters, Carole Taylor and Cathy Jones. Some news reports following his death incorrectly identified his birth year as 1936, but the obituary in the Los Angeles Times published by his family correctly listed the year as 1940.

== Filmography ==
=== Films ===
Year	Title	Role	Notes
1973	Scarecrow	Ray	
1973	The Seven-Ups	Moon	
1974	Open Season	Art	
1975	The Happy Hooker	The Cop	
1976	The Premonition	Jude	
1976	God Told Me To	Bernard Phillips	
1977	The Baron	Joey	
1977	Stunts	Pete Lustig	
1978	Deathsport	Ankar Moor	
1979	Steel	Dancer	
1979	Delta Fox	David 'Delta' Fox	
1979	Vampire	Prince Anton Voytek	
1980	The Ninth Configuration	Richard	
1980	The Formula	General Helmut Kladen/Frank Tedesco	
1981	Sizzle	Johnny O'Brien	
1982	The Sword and the Sorcerer	Titus Cromwell	
1984	Treasure: In Search of the Golden Horse	Narrator	
1985	Cut and Run	Colonel Brian Horne	
1985	Invasion U.S.A.	Mikhail Rostov	
1985	Savage Dawn	Reverend Romano	
1987	The Barbarians	Kadar	
1987	Nightforce	Bishop	
1988	Little Nikita	Scuba	
1988	Bad Dreams	Franklin Harris	
1989	High Stakes	Slim	
1990	The Forbidden Dance	Benjamin Maxwell	
1990	Aftershock	Commander Eastern	
1990	Return to Justice	Sheriff Jethro Lincoln	
1990	Invasion Force	Michael Cooper	
1990	Lockdown	James Garrett	
1991	Alligator II: The Mutation	'Hawk' Hawkins	
1991	Trancers II	Dr. E.D. Wardo	
1991	The Last Hero	Montoro	
1991	Puppet Master III: Toulon's Revenge	Major Kraus	
1992	Maximum Force	Max Tanabe	
1992	Inside Edge	Mario Gio	
1992	Double Threat	Detective Robert Fenich	
1993	Merlin	Pendragon	
1993	H.P. Lovecraft's: Necronomicon	Jethro De Lapoer	Part One
1994	Scanner Cop	Karl Glock	
1994	Cyborg 3: The Recycler	Anton Lewellyn	
1994	Midnight Confessions	Detective Harris	
1994	Dangerous Waters	Admiral	
1994	Death Match	Jimmie Fratello	
1994	Loving Deadly	Dr. Mel	
1995	Terrified	Office Worker #2	
1995	Dragon Fury	Vestor	
1995	Terminal Virus	Calloway	
1995	Warrior of Justice	Doug 'The Master'	
1995	Takedown		
1995	Destination Vegas	Richard	
1996	Werewolf	Noel	
1996	Lone Tiger	Bruce Rossner	
1996	Total Force	Dr. Edmund Wellington	
1996	Diamond Run	Sloan	
1996	Vendetta	Dr. David Wilson	
1996	The Garbage Man		
1997	Under Oath	Daniel Saltarelli	
1997	Ground Rules		
1997	Divine Lovers	Gregory	
1998	Shattered Illusions	Sal	
1998	Armstrong	Colonel Vladimir Zukov	
1998	Love and War II		
1999	Lima: Breaking the Silence	James Gallagher	
1999	Eastside	Mihalas Gabriel	
1999	Enemy Action	Dimitri	
2001	Death Game	Chief Canton	
2001	Ankle Bracelet	Jerry	
2002	Outta Time	Franco	
2002	Crime and Punishment	Peter Luzhin	
2002	Curse of the Forty-Niner	Old Man Prichard	
2003	Fabulous Shiksa in Distress	The Messenger	Uncredited
2003	Ancient Warriors	Curtis Mayhew	
2003	The Mummy's Kiss	Dr. Wallis Harwa	
2003	Final Combat		
2003	Corpses Are Forever	General Morton	
2005	The Great Wall of Magellan	Old Akillian	
2006	Wedding Slashers	Daddy	
2007	Mil Mascaras vs. the Aztec Mummy	The President of the United States	
2007	Halloween	Principal Chambers	
2009	Dark Fields	Karl Lumis/Mr. Jones	
2009	Chrome Angels	Uncle Ted	
2009	The Rain	Karl Lumis	
2010	Resurrection	The President	
2011	Gun of the Black Sun	Damian Lupescu	
2012	The Lords of Salem	Reverend Jonathan Hawthorne	

=== Television ===
Year	Title	Role	Notes
1975–1979	Starsky & Hutch	Various	3 episodes
1976	Bronk	Scorpio	Episode: "Target: Unknown"
1976	Baretta	Nick	Episode: "They Don't Make 'em Like They Used To"
1976	Serpico	Alex Demico	Episode: "Prime Evil"
1977	Police Woman	Tedesco	Episode: "Solitaire"
1977	The Streets of San Francisco	Harry Kraft	Episode: "Time Out"
1978	The Bionic Woman	Denton	Episode: "Out of Body"
1978	Battlestar Galactica	Wolfe	Episode: "Gun on Ice Planet Zero"
1979–1981	Vega$	Mr. North/Benjamin Lang	2 episodes
1979	Barnaby Jones	Terry Shaw	Episode: "Nightmare in Hawaii"
1979	Buck Rogers in the 25th Century	Morgan Velosi	Episode: "Vegas in Space"
1979	A Man Called Sloane	Jeremy Mason	Episode: "Masquerade of Terror"
1979	Charlie's Angels	Freddie Jefferson	Episode: "Angels on the Street"
1980	Galactica 1980	Commander Xaviar	Episode: "Galactica Discovers Earth"
1980	Alcatraz: The Whole Shocking Story	Sam Shockley	TV movie
1981–1982	The Phoenix	Justin Preminger	Miniseries
1982	McClain's Law	Ernie Neil	Episode: "The Sign of the Beast"
1982	Bring 'Em Back Alive	Warden Pike	Episode: "Escape from Kampoon"
1983	T. J. Hooker	Virgil Dobbs	Episode: "Carnal Express"
1983	Manimal	Zoltan Gregory	Episode: "Illusion"
1983–1984	The Fall Guy	Robert Vessman/Randolph Gresham	2 episodes
1984	Blue Thunder	P.V.C.	Episode: "Second Thunder"
1984	Automan	Sheriff Clay Horton	Episode: "Renegade Run"
1984	The A-Team	John Turian	Episode: "Hot Styles"
1984	Matt Houston	Jesse Mercer	Episode: "Apostle of Death"
1984	Cover Up	Moreneau	Episode: "Murder in Malibu"
1984	Partners in Crime	George	Episode: "Double Jeopardy"
1984	Masquerade	General Vladmimir Sirin	Episode: "Flashpoint"
1985	Riptide	Albert Trumonde/Martin Stonewall	Episode: "Curse of the Mary Aberdeen"
1985	MacGruder and Loud	Joey Dime	Episode: "Odds Favour Death"
1985	Scarecrow and Mrs. King	Craig Eiger	Episode: "You Only Die Twice"
1985	Airwolf	John Bradford Horn / Gerald Van Dorian / Neal Streep	Episode: "The Horn of Plenty"
1986	The Last Precinct	The Vampire	Episode: "Never Cross a Vampire"
1987	Once a Hero	Victor Lazarus	Episode: "The Return of Lazarus"
1987	The Law & Harry McGraw	Mr. Trent	Episode: "Mr. Chapman, I Presume?"
1987	Werewolf	Servan Domballe	
1989	CBS Summer Playhouse	Booth	Episode: "The Heat"
1989	Hunter	Frank Lassiter	Episode: "The Legion"
1990	Kojak	Sands:	Episode: "Flowers for Matty"
1990	True Blue		Episode: "Hickory, Dickory, Dock"
1991	Super Force	Dr. Lothar Presley	Episode: "The Sins of the Fathers"
1991	Dark Justice		Episode: "I Hate Mondays"
1991	Jake and the Fatman	Richard Rose	Episode: "Where or When"
1991–1992	Super Force	Dr. Lothar Presley	Episode: "Sins of the Father"
1992–1994	Murder, She Wrote	Philip de Kooning/Michael O'Connor	2 episodes
1993	The Hat Squad	Nick Ashe	Episode: "The Liquidator"
1993	Star Trek: The Next Generation	Arctus Baran	Episode: "Gambit"
1993	Cobra	Dr. Mortimer T. Anon	Episode: "Playing with Fire"
1994	Thunder in Paradise	Volcoff	Episode: "Blast Off"
1995	Highlander: The Series	Kage/John Kirin-The Messiah	Episode: "Blind Faith"
1995	Baywatch	Diederick	Episode: "Deep Trouble"
1995-1996	Phantom 2040	Graft (voice)	
1998	Mike Hammer, Private Eye	Graham Mintner	Episode: "Dead Men Talk"
1999	Air America	Glen	Episode: "Old Gold"
1999	Acapulco H.E.A.T.	Elliot Roth	Episode: "Code Name: The Stolen Leg"
1999	Battlestar Galactica: The Second Coming	Count Iblis	
2002	Six Feet Under	Commitment Ceremony Presider	Episode: "I'll Take You"
2003	Charmed	Cronyn	Episode: "The Day the Magic Died"

== Bibliography ==
- Patrick Loubatière. Richard Lynch Forever (2013).
