= Royal Starr Film Festival =

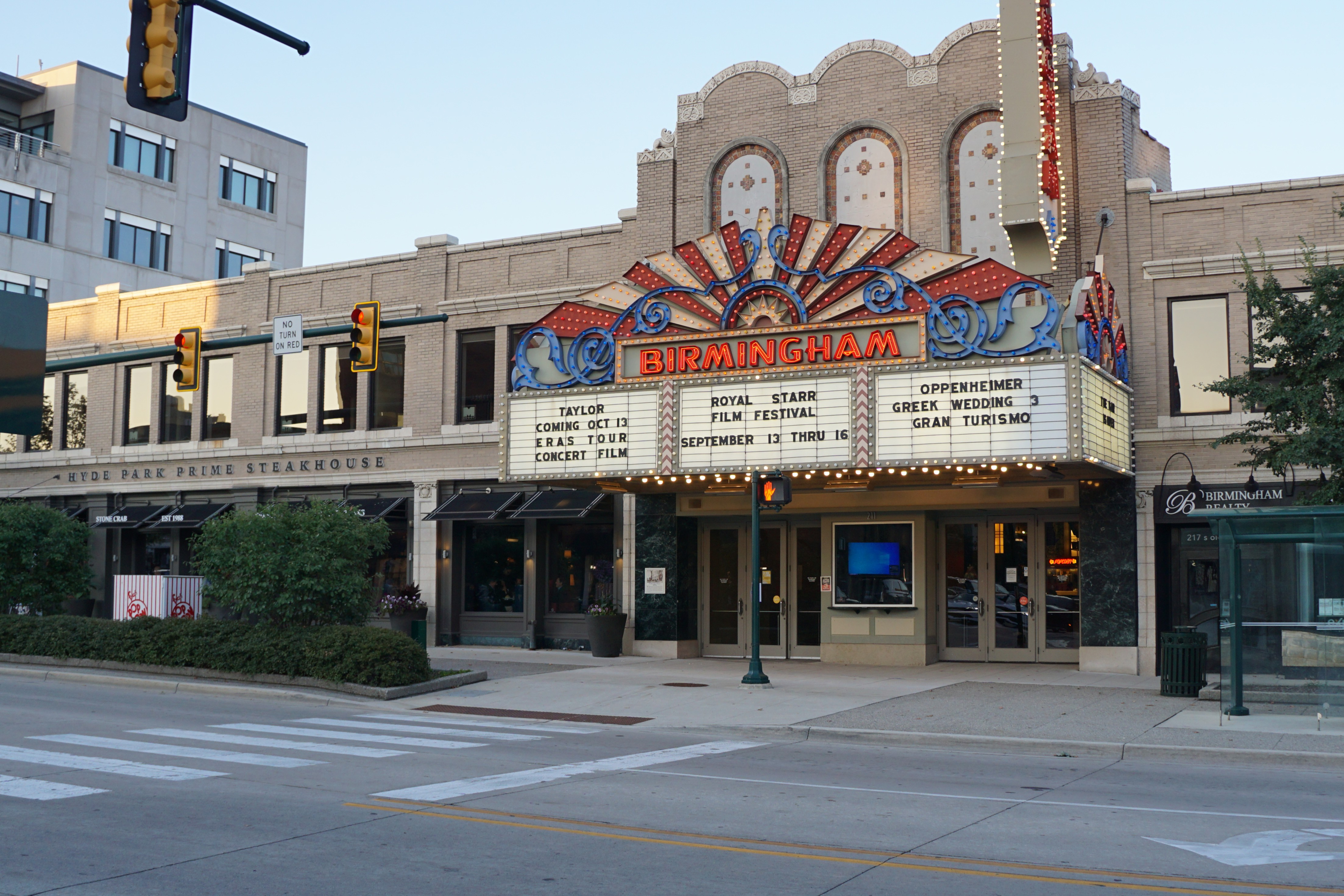
- Location: Birmingham, Michigan, United States
- Founded: 2016; 10 years ago
- Founded by: Larry Kantor, Gene Meadows, Billy Whitehouse, Luke Castle, Shane Sevo, Charlie Haviland, Scott Paul Dunham
- Hosted by: Royal Starr Arts Institute
- Language: International
- Website: royalstarrfilmfestival.com

The Royal Starr Film Festival is an international film festival held annually in Birmingham, Michigan. at the historic Birmingham 8 theatre.

== History ==
The Royal Starr Film Festival was first launched in the city of Royal Oak, Michigan by the Royal Starr Arts Institute where it would continue to operate out of Emagine Royal Oak until the 2020 COVID-19 pandemic would send the festival outdoors to the parking lot of Emagine Novi, in Novi, Michigan where the side of the multiplex was converted into a drive-in movie theatre. The festival would return to Royal Oak the following year, but two years later they would move to the historic Birmingham 8, Powered by Emagine.

In addition to the annual festival, the Royal Starr Arts Institute holds monthly mixers to provide networking opportunities and cultivate a community of independent filmmakers.

== See also ==
- Detroit Windsor International Film Festival
- Windsor International Film Festival
- Ann Arbor Film Festival
