= Irma St. Paule =

American actress (1926–2007)

- Born: March 23, 1926; Odesa, Ukrainian SSR, Soviet Union
- Died: January 9, 2007 (aged 80); New York City, U.S.
- Occupation: Actress
- Years active: 1985–2007

Irma St. Paule (March 23, 1926 – January 9, 2007) was an American character actress who appeared on stage, screen and television from 1985 to 2007. Often portraying elderly characters, she appeared in productions on Broadway and Off-Broadway, and in regional theatre productions across the United States during her career.

== Early life ==
Irma St. Paule was born on March 23, 1926, in Odesa in the Ukrainian Soviet Socialist Republic. Her mother was from Russia and her father came from Turkey. At an early age, St. Paule and her family moved to New York City. She later moved to Chicago after she was married. There, St Paule enrolled at the Goodman School of Drama (now the Theatre School at DePaul University) to study as a ballerina. After she and her husband were granted a divorce, she returned to New York City and later said of her relocation to an interviewer, "By then, my family was mostly gone so I was able to do as I wished. And I did!".

== Career ==
Later in life, St. Paule began a career in acting, appearing in several films and television shows from 1985, often playing grandmothers of Italian descent. Films in which she was credited in during the 1980s were The Oracle (1985), Walls of Glass (1985), Psychos in Love (1987) and Rain (1989). St. Paule made her debut in a television film by being cast in The Bride in Black in 1990, and portrayed Ya Ya Andros on the NBC soap opera Guiding Light from 1992 to 1994. In the meantime, she was cast in three films in 1993: St. Paule played Teresa in The Cemetery Club, Household Saints, and The Saint of Fort Washington. She later was seen in Who Do I Gotta Kill? (1994), Party Girl, Mother Teresa in Jeffrey, and 12 Monkeys (the final three films were released in 1995).

In 1995, St. Paule made her sole appearance on Broadway, portraying The Strega in a revival of The Rose Tattoo. The following year, she was cast in the films Caught, Love is All There Is, Trees Lounge, The Big Bajoor, and Thinner. For the remainder of the 1990s, St. Paule was in Better Than Ever (1997), Kiss Me, Guido (1997), Grandma Matilda in Desecration (1999), Coming Soon (1999), and Fever (1999). Throughout 2000 she appeared in the films Wirey Spindell, Things You Can Tell Just by Looking at Her, Where the Money Is, Fast Food Fast Women, Fear of Fiction, and A Piece of Eden. St. Paule continued her acting career in 2001 to 2004, when she was cast in Cat Lady (2001), Queenie in Love (2001), Errors, Errors, Freaks and Oddities (2002), Found Money (2003), Jersey Girl (2004), Second Best (2004), and The Amazing Floydini (2004).

Later career roles in films featuring St. Paule included Homecoming (2005), Duane Hopwood (2005), Bittersweet Place (2005), Life on the Edge (2005), Mrs. Leeds in Satan's Playground (2005), 9A (2006), Last Request (2006), In The Blood (2006), and Made in Brooklyn (2006). Her final show on stage was in an Off-Broadway revival of All the Way Home in late 2006, in which had a non-speaking role as an elderly secluded woman residing at a rustic, rural home. St. Paule's performance was praised by the press.

Earlier, she also had other Off-Broadway credits, such as the 1995 Classic Stage Company's production of Endgame in the part of Nell, she portrayed Maria Josefa in Another Part of the Forest, Owners, and the 2003 environmental theatre event The Angel Project. St. Paule's regional theatre credits include portraying the role of the ailing aunt in Vigil at Geva Theatre Center, 1933 at the Denver Center for the Performing Arts, Enchanted April at the Hartford Stage, Griller at Goodman Theatre, and The Dybbuk at Pittsburgh Public Theater. Her other roles in television were episodes of Kate & Allie, Sex and the City, Homicide: Life on the Street, Law & Order: Special Victims Unit, Third Watch, Wonderland, Chappelle's Show, Law & Order: Criminal Intent, and Law & Order. St. Paule died in New York City on January 9, 2007. At the time of her death, colleagues believed her to be the oldest working actress on New York City's Broadway stage.

== Selected filmography ==
- 1985 The Oracle as Mrs. Malatesta
- 1985 Walls of Glass as Unknown
- 1987 Psychos in Love as Sara
- 1989 Rain as Passenger
- 1992-1994 Guiding Light (TV Series) as Unknown
- 1993 The Cemetery Club as Theresa
- 1993 Household Saints as Mary
- 1993 The Saint of Fort Washington as Neighbor Lady
- 1994 Who Do I Gotta Kill? as Woman With Knitting Needle
- 1995 Party Girl as Mumbling Library Patron
- 1995 Jeffrey as Mother Teresa
- 1995 12 Monkeys as Poet
- 1996 Caught as Fish Store Customer
- 1996 Love Is All There Is as Mrs. Rondino
- 1996 Trees Lounge as Grandma
- 1996 Everything Relative as Aunt Sadie
- 1996 Thinner as Suzanne Lempke
- 1997 Kiss Me, Guido as Grandma
- 1997 Better Than Ever as Heather
- 1998 Paranoia as Old Woman
- 1999 Suits as Miss Volney
- 1999 Coming Soon as Blind Lady #2 (uncredited)
- 1999 Fever as Mrs. Rhula Miskiewicz
- 1999 Wirey Spindell as Angel Lady
- 1999 Desecration as Grandma Matilda
- 2000 Things You Can Tell Just by Looking at Her as Elaine's Mother (segment "This is Dr. Keener")
- 2000 A Piece of Eden as Maria At 90
- 2000 Where the Money Is as Mrs. Galer
- 2000 Fast Food Fast Women as Mary-Beth
- 2000 Fear of Fiction as Gertrude
- 2001 Queenie in Love as Mrs. Newman
- 2002 Errors, Freaks & Oddities as Agnes DeMilo
- 2003 Jersey Guy as Mrs. Rappaport
- 2004 Second Best as Beth
- 2004 The Amazing Floydini as Edith
- 2005 Duane Hopwood as Mrs. Fillipi
- 2005 Life on the Ledgeas Grandmother
- 2005 Bittersweet Place as Mrs. Windrowski
- 2005 Vieni via con me as Tuzza
- 2005 Homecoming as Juanita
- 2006 9A as Petra
- 2006 Lanchonete Olympia as Female Diner's Mother
- 2006 Last Request as Grandma
- 2006 In the Blood as Madame Maria
- 2006 Satan's Playground as Mrs. Leeds
- 2007 Body/Antibody as Woman At Bus Stop
- 2007 Made in Brooklyn as Mary
- 2007 The Last New Yorker as Pearl
