= John Costelloe (actor) =

American actor

- Costelloe in Kazaam (1996)
- Born: November 8, 1961; Brooklyn, New York, U.S.
- Died: December 16, 2008 (aged 47); Sunset Park, Brooklyn, New York, U.S.
- Occupations: Actor, firefighter

John A. Costelloe (November 8, 1961 – December 16, 2008) was an American actor best known for his role as Jim "Johnny Cakes" Witowski, the lover of Vito Spatafore, in the HBO television series The Sopranos.

Costelloe, a former FDNY firefighter, died of a self-inflicted gunshot wound on December 16, 2008, at the age of 47. His body was found two days later at his home in Sunset Park, Brooklyn.

Shortly before his death, Costelloe had been playing a hustler in the hit ensemble play Gang of Seven.

== Filmography ==
Year	Title	Role	Notes
1989	Last Exit to Brooklyn	Tommy	
1989	Black Rain	The Kid	
1990	Die Hard 2	Sergeant Oswald Cochrane	
1991	The Hard Way	Fake Dead Guy / Cop	
1991	Billy Bathgate	Lulu	
1993	Joey Breaker	Randy Jeter	
1993	Manhattan Murder Mystery	Policeman #1	
1994	Who Do I Gotta Kill?	Billy "Bink-Bink" Borelli	
1994–1996	New York Undercover	John Santucci	5 episodes
1995	Kiss of Death	Cleary	
1996	Kazaam	Travis	
2000	Law & Order	Colin Parnell	Episode: "Endurance"
2003	Crooked Lines	Manny	
2004	The Kings of Brooklyn	Miller	
2006	The Sopranos	Jim Witowski	4 episodes
2008	Doubt	Warren Hurley	
