= Detroit Windsor International Film Festival =

American film festival

Coordinates: 42°21′26.44″N 83°4′12.38″W

- Location: Detroit, Michigan, United States; Windsor, Ontario, Canada
- Founded: 2008
- Language: International

Logo for the 4th annual DWIFF

The Detroit Windsor International Film Festival (DWIFF), which ran from 2008 to 2012, was a publicly attended film festival held each June in the Detroit–Windsor region, with events taking place in both Detroit, Michigan, and Windsor, Ontario. The festival was closely associated with Wayne State University as they incorporated their own pre-existing student film festival into the DWIFF and many of the festivities were held on Wayne State's campus in Midtown Detroit.

== Events ==
Like most film festivals, the DWIFF played host to a variety of films ranging from student films to major Hollywood productions, but it was also known for special events that were held as a part of the festival since its inception.

=== DWIFF Challenge ===
Modeled after the 48 Hour Film Project contestants are assigned a genre, a character, a prop, and a line of dialogue, and had 48 hours to create a short film containing those elements. The submissions were then judged and given their own screening as a part of the festival.

=== Tech Fair ===
Held at Wayne State University the DWIFF Tech Fair provided viewers with a look at emerging technology and a variety of how-to courses on everything from personal electronics to film making.

=== MovingMedia ===
Launched in 2001, MovingMedia is Wayne State University's official film festival. Inclusion in the festival is selective, and there is a juried competition with prizes. DWIFF and MovingMedia entered in partnership in 2009. The festival was open to local, national and international students. The festival includes 6 categories: - Narrative, - Documentary, - Music Video, - Experimental, - Animation - and New Media. In 2012, the festival was open to high school students. The festival usually occurred in June.

== See also ==
- Windsor International Film Festival
- 3rd Detroit Windsor International Film Festival (2010)
- Ann Arbor Film Festival
- Toronto International Film Festival
- Royal Starr Film Festival
- Windsor–Detroit International Freedom Festival
- Detroit–Windsor
