= Desecration (film) =

- Theatrical film poster
- Directed by: Dante Tomaselli
- Written by: Dante Tomaselli
- Produced by: Tony Rullis; Jack Swain; Dante Tomaselli
- Starring: Irma St. Paule; Christie Sanford; Danny Lopes; Salvatore Paul Piro
- Cinematography: Brendan Flynt
- Edited by: Marcus Bonilla
- Music by: Dante Tomaselli; Michael Tomaselli
- Release date: 1999
- Running time: 88 minutes
- Country: United States
- Language: English
- Budget: $150,000

Desecration is a 1999 American horror film written and directed by Dante Tomaselli. The film stars Irma St. Paule and Christie Sanford, who would both return in several of Tomaselli's later films. The film originally started off as a short film that Tomaselli created in 1994 and is his feature film directorial debut.

Tomaselli drew inspiration for the film from his childhood and also heavily utilized dream sequences to impart the film's story.

== Plot ==
A 16-year-old teen named Bobby is emotionally damaged by the early death of his mother. After accidentally causing a nun's death, he unleashes a chain of supernatural events that lead him into the pits of Hell.

== Cast ==
- Irma St. Paule as Grandma Matilda
- Christie Sanford as Sister Madeline / Mary Rullo
- Danny Lopes as Bobby Rullo
- Salvatore Paul Piro as Mr. Rullo
- Vincent Lamberti as Brother Nicolas
- Maureen Tomaselli as Sister Rosemary
- Gene Burke as Father O'Leary
- Ruth Ray as Reverend Mother
- Helen Palladino as Mrs. Cannizzaro

== Reception ==
Merle Bertrant of Film Threat panned the film and gave it one and a half stars, stating, "All moody funky art-crap visuals and no cohesive narrative to speak of, the only thing desecrated in Desecration is the rapidly fading art of storytelling." In contrast, Sean McGinnis of DVD Verdict called it a cult film that it would "engender strong feelings one way or the other". McGinnis said that he "found the film entertaining and creepy in a palpable way."

== Short film ==
Tomaselli created the initial short that inspired the full-length film in 1994. The film was experimental and explored themes such as drug usage within the clergy and Catholicism in specific.
