= Caesar and Otto's Paranormal Halloween =

2015 film by Dave Campfield

- Directed by: Dave Campfield
- Written by: Dave Campfield
- Starring: Dave Campfield; Paul Chomicki
- Distributed by: Wild Eye Releasing
- Release date: 2015
- Country: United States
- Language: English

Caesar and Otto's Paranormal Halloween is a 2015 comedy horror film. It was written and directed by Dave Campfield. the film stars Campfield himself, Paul Chomicki, Beverly Randolph, Felissa Rose, and Deron Miller. The film is also the first feature film for actresses JamieLee Ackerman and Josephine Iannece. This film is the sixth film in the Caesar and Otto series.

The film had its world premiere on June 29, 2015 at the Florida Supercon, where it won for best comedy.

== Plot ==
Half-brothers Caesar and Otto live out some of horror's most terrifying scenes when they agree to house-sit a home filled with ghostly visions, levitating objects and possessions.

== Cast ==
- Dave Campfield as Caesar Denovio
- Paul Chomicki as Otto Denovio
- Scott Aguilar as Fred Denovio
- Deron Miller as Father Jason Steiger
- JamieLee Ackerman as Kyla
- Beverly Randolph as Shari Hartlin
- Brinke Stevens as Sashi
- Josephine Iannece as Gilda
- Ken Macfarlane as Jerry
- Samantha Barrios as Roberta
- Felissa Rose as Lakota
- Tiffany Shepis as Jamie Tremain
- Andre Gower as Sam Wellner
- Vernon Wells as Guy Hunsinger
- Sean Whalen as Monsignor Winston
- Debbie Rochon as Shana

== Reception ==
Bloody Disgusting found that "While it’s not Scary Movie, Caesar and Otto’s Paranormal Halloween isn’t meant to be for that audience. Rather, the film takes a far more broad selection of films, both current and classic, and brings them together in this mash-up that has a certain charm all its own. The fun use of the many cameos also reflects the effort by Campfield and company to make a fun film."

A review at HorrorNews stated "Paranormal Halloween is clearly not for everyone. But for those of us looking for an escape from the mundane, monotonous and simply want a few laughs that not at all a bad choice."

== Analysis ==
The film pays homage to various classic horror films, including The Exorcist, The Amityville Horror, Sinister and Insidious.
