= Felissa Rose =

American actress (born 1969)

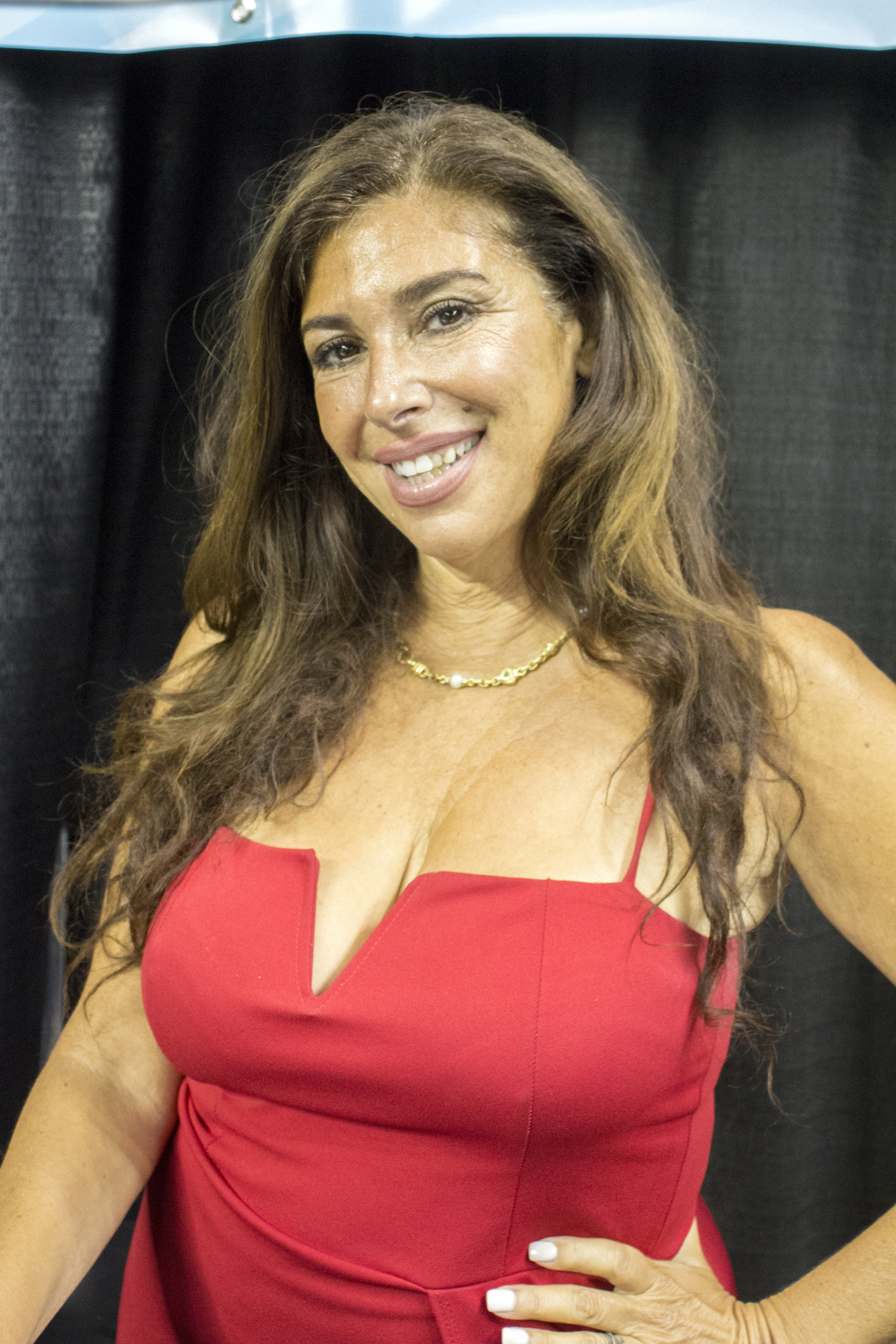
- Rose in 2023
- Born: Felissa Rose Esposito; May 23, 1969 (age 57); New York City, U.S.
- Other name: Felissa Rose Esposito Miller
- Education: New York University
- Occupation: Actress
- Years active: 1983–present
- Spouse: Deron Miller (m. 2004)
- Children: 3
- Website: felissarose.com

Felissa Rose Esposito (born May 23, 1969), better known as simply Felissa Rose, is an American actress. She has amassed over 200 film credits, and is best known for her work in the horror genre, for which she is recognized as a "scream queen."

Rose made her film debut as Angela Baker in the cult horror film Sleepaway Camp (1983), which established her as a horror icon. She reprised the role in the 2008 sequel Return to Sleepaway Camp. Her other horror roles include Elsa Lansing in Silent Night, Zombie Night (2009), Mother in The Perfect House (2012), Rachel Steele in Camp Dread (2014), Angela Freeman in Death House (2018), Kathleen in Victor Crowley (2018), Ms. Crowell in Bloody Summer Camp (2021), and Ms. Principe in Terrifier 2 (2022). She plays Donna in the film, Stream. Rose continues to make regular appearances on The Joe Bob Briggs Show, The Last Drive-In on Shudder, and appeared in The Boulet Brothers's Halfway to Halloween special in 2023.

In 2016, Rose produced a number of music videos for the metal band Slayer.

Rose toured with Peaches Christ during the summer of 2026 for a celebration of Sleepaway Camp. It showcased Peaches' live podcast with co-host Michael Varrati.

== Early life ==
Felissa Rose Esposito was born on May 23, 1969, in Greenwich Village in New York City and raised in Syosset on Long Island. Rose graduated from Syosset High School and later earned a degree from New York University.

== Career ==
Rose made her debut film appearance in the 1983 horror film Sleepaway Camp, in which she plays Angela Baker. She later said of the film, "It was such a big part of my childhood. It's really hard to look at it objectively. On opening night I went to the theater with all my friends and watched it for the first time with a public audience. It was the best feeling. The energy in the theater was intense. People were really freaked out by the ending. I felt really good about the film."

After appearing in Sleepaway Camp, she made some more sporadic appearances in a few films and television series, including the 1993 romantic comedy film The Night We Never Met and an episode of the short-lived 1998 television series Prey. In 1999, she was contacted by Jeff Hayes, who operates the official Sleepaway Camp website, via a letter in the mail asking her to do an interview for the website and gauge her interest in doing a new Sleepaway Camp sequel. Shortly thereafter, Hayes met with Rose in New York.

She has since returned to cinema and has appeared in such films as Zombiegeddon (2003), Nikos (2003), and Sludge (2005). She has also appeared in two films by New Jersey filmmaker Dante Tomaselli: Horror (2002) and Satan's Playground (2005). In addition Felissa co-hosted the 2005 Village Halloween Parade in New York City with fellow scream queens Debbie Rochon and Raine Brown. She also had a cameo role in the sequel to the 2008 Sleepaway Camp sequel Return to Sleepaway Camp. In the sequel, she reprises the role of Angela Baker. The movie had a straight-to-D.V.D. release on November 4, 2008. She also appears in Hotdog Casserole, written and directed by Chris Raab, as the mother in a dysfunctional family. Rose starred in a role as Mother in the segment "Dinner Guest" in the anthology horror film, The Perfect House. She also portrayed forensic pathologist Amy Short in the thriller Poe.

In 2016, Felissa starred in the paranormal horror film Family Possessions, written and directed by Tommy Faircloth. The film also starred Mark Patton. In May 2017, she helped produce and acted in the horror film Death House. That same year, she appeared in Victor Crowley. In November 2022, Rose worked with Shelley Duvall on the film The Forest Hills.

== Personal life ==
Rose has three children with her husband, former CKY singer/guitarist Deron Miller.

== Partial filmography ==
=== Film ===
Year	Film	Role	Notes	Ref(s)
1983	Sleepaway Camp	Angela Baker / Peter Baker		
1993	The Night We Never Met	Young Girl	Uncredited	
1995	Get with a Safe Food Attitude	2-B Mom Rapper		
2002	Horror	Art Therapist		
2003	Zombiegeddon	Melissa	Direct-to-video	
2003	Corpses Are Forever	Gina Matthews	Direct-to-video	
2003	Nikos the Impaler	Sandra Kane	Direct-to-video	
2005	Cerebral Print: The Secret Files	Carolyn the M.I.L.F. / Tiffany		
2005	Slaughter Party	Tara	Direct-to-video	
2005	Dead Serious	Susan Rosario		
2006	Evil Ever After	Neighbor	Direct-to-video	
2006	Satan's Playground	Donna Bruno		
2006	Under Surveillance	Heidi Broonen		
2007	Sludge	Sandra		
2007	Trite This Way	Narrator		
2008	Return to Sleepaway Camp	Angela Baker / Sheriff Jerry		
2008	Zombie Killers: Elephant's Graveyard	Lia		
2009	Silent Night, Zombie Night	Elsa Lansing		
2009	Caesar and Otto's Summer Camp Massacre	Angela Baker / Carrie		
2010	Dahmer vs. Gacy	Joanie Farana		
2012	Sleepaway Camp IV: The Survivor	Angela Baker	Archive footage	
2012	Caesar and Otto's Deadly Xmas			
2014	Camp Dread	Rachel Steele		
2015	Caesar and Otto's Paranormal Halloween	Lakota		
2015	The Last House	Realtor		
2015	No Solicitors	Priscilla		
2016	2 Jennifer	Jennifer Smith		
2017	Death House	Dr. Angela Freeman		
2017	Bethany	Janice the Realtor		
2018	Victor Crowley	Kathleen		
2018	Family Possessions	Susan		
2018	Rootwood	Laura Benott		
2019	Stalked by My Doctor: A Sleepwalker's Nightmare	Dr. Pamela		
2019	More Beautiful for Having Been Broken	Millicent		
2020	A Nun's Curse	Sister Monday		
2021	Bloody Summer Camp	Ms. Crowell		
2022	How to Kill Your Roommates and Get Away With It	Agent Denver		
2022	ShadowMarsh	Jill		
2022	Shriekshow	Gloria		
2022	Mike & Fred vs The Dead	Mom		
2022	The Spirit Board Sessions	Unknown		
2022	Terrifier 2	Ms. Principe		
2023	Craving	Les		
2023	The Omicron Killer	Edie Schaefer / Necromancer		
2023	The New Hands	Dr. Pretorius		
2023	The Forest Hills	Dr. Gonzalez		
2023	Go Away	Aunt Mary		
2024	Stream	Donna		
2026	Scary Movie	Bar patron	Uncredited	

=== Television ===
Year	Film	Role	Notes	Ref(s)
2005	NYC Halloween Parade	Host	Television film	
2009	His Name Was Jason: 30 Years of Friday the 13th	Herself	Documentary	
2019	The Boulet Brothers' Dragula	Herself	Guest judge	
2023	The Boulet Brothers' Halfway to Halloween TV Special	Herself		
2024	Meat the Carvers	Delores Carver		
