= Detroit–Windsor International Freedom Festival =

Canadian-American multi-day celebration

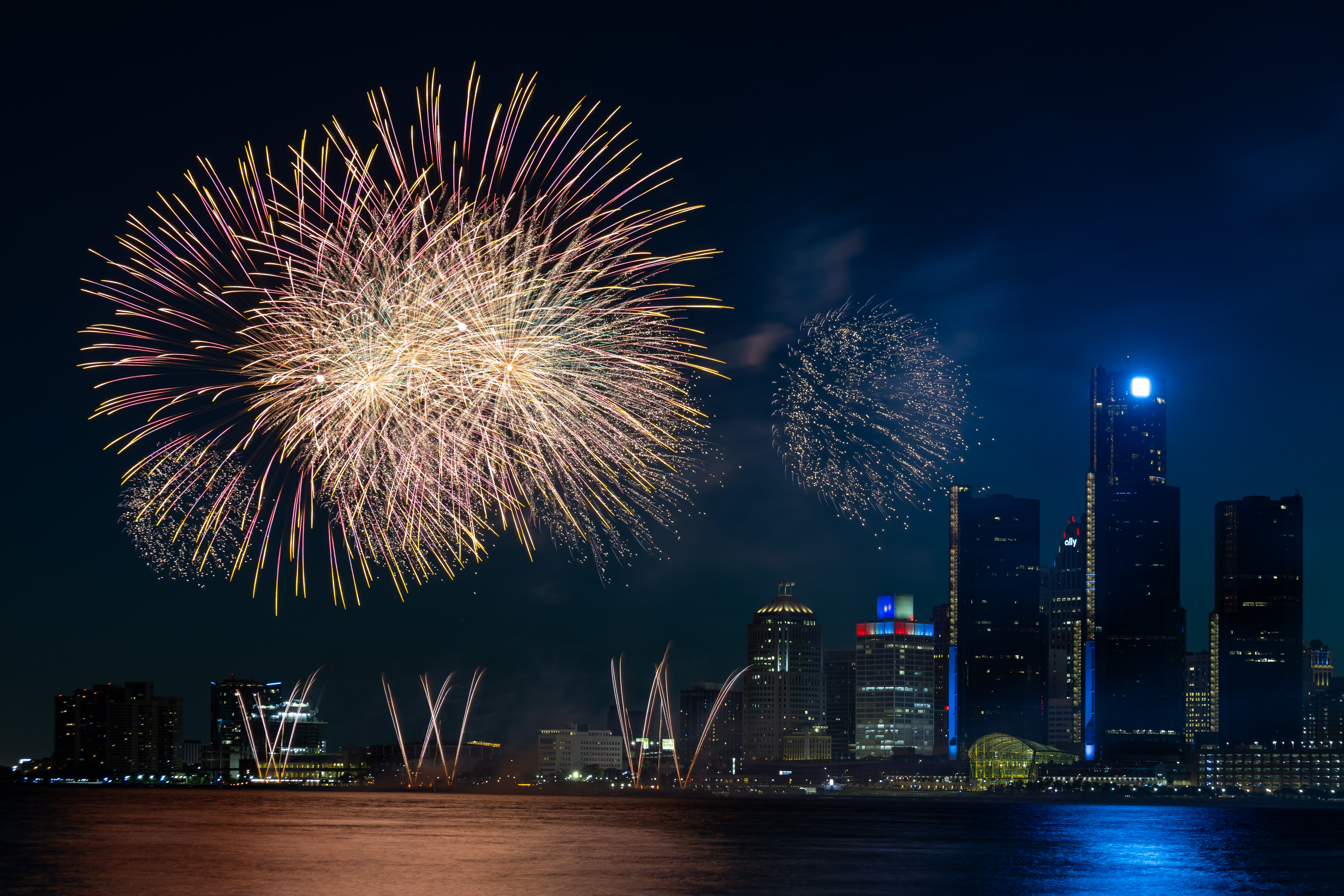
The festival's fireworks display

The International Freedom Festival is a multi-day celebration in late June marking Canada Day on July 1 and the American Independence Day on July 4. Detroit, Michigan, in the United States and Windsor, Ontario, in Canada jointly celebrate the multi-day festival which draws about 3.5 million visitors. The International Freedom Festival began in 1959.

Beginning in 2007, the Festival became two separate events, Windsor Summer Fest, and Detroit River Days.

Summer Fest is a 19-day festival, which takes place along the scenic riverfront in Windsor. More than 500,000 people attend the event each year.

The Detroit RiverFront Conservancy began the River Days festival in June 2007 to introduce the community and visitors to the transformed Detroit International Riverfront. The festival marked the opening of significant portions of the new Detroit RiverWalk and the festival has continued each year to spotlight this destination in the city of Detroit.

The highlight of both festivals is the fireworks display in celebration of Canada Day and Independence Day. It is one of the largest fireworks displays in North America, lighting up the sky over Windsor and Detroit. This annual spectacle draws more than 1,000,000 to the Windsor and Detroit riverfronts. It is usually held on the Monday shared by both festivals. Traditionally, the fireworks have been preceded by the singing of the Canadian national anthem "O Canada" followed by the American national anthem "The Star-Spangled Banner". Despite the lyric change in the Canadian national anthem in 2018, the line "in all thy sons command" has been sung instead of "in all of us command" with the exception of 2021 when the line "in all of us command" is sung. Traditionally the national anthems were sung with a backing track or an instrument.

== Events ==
Traditionally, several days of events were planned, ending with one of the world's largest fireworks displays. The event usually took place on the last Wednesday of June, every year. However, in 2010, the day was moved to a Monday. The Windsor side also contains a carnival with additional events and rides.

In 2020 and 2021, the fireworks event had to be postponed to later months and moved to designated locations within Southeast Lower Michigan and ban spectators from attending in response to COVID-19 pandemic and public health safety concerns as it was a television-only event broadcast on WDIV-TV. From 2022 onward, the event gets held once again at the riverfront with spectators attending the fireworks in person.

== Sponsors ==
For most of its existence it was sponsored by Hudson's. Its corporate successor Target took over as sponsor until 2013, when the Ford Motor Company became the primary sponsor, with the event re-branded as the Ford Fireworks presented by Target. The show is broadcast on TV by NBC affiliate WDIV-TV Local 4, while WJR airs an audio simulcast of its music. On the Windsor side, there is a midway consisting of carnival rides and concessions during the festival. The Midway operates as a stand-alone attraction at the end of June and beginning of July. It's also sponsored by Zehrs, providing free transportation for people to get to the fireworks via Transit Windsor. The Ford Fireworks is produced by The Parade Company of Detroit.

== See also ==
- Detroit International Riverfront
- Detroit–Windsor
- Detroit Windsor International Film Festival
- Windsor International Film Festival
