= Ellen Sandweiss =

American actress

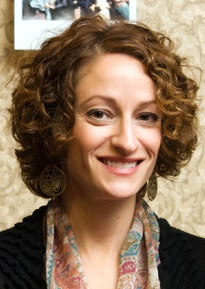
- Sandweiss in 2009
- Born: Detroit, Michigan, U.S.
- Education: University of Michigan (BFA, MA)
- Occupations: Actress; dancer; singer
- Years active: 1976–present
- Children: Jessy Hodges
- Relatives: Beck Bennett (son-in-law)

Ellen Sandweiss is an American actress. She is best known for her role as Cheryl Williams in The Evil Dead.

== Early life ==
Sandweiss was born in Detroit, Michigan, to a Jewish family. She graduated from Groves High School in 1977, where she participated in plays and later Super 8 movies with classmates Sam Raimi and Bruce Campbell. Sandweiss later earned a degree from the University of Michigan.

== Career ==
She gained notoriety in the 1981 horror cult-classic The Evil Dead, playing Ash Williams' sister Cheryl. Afterwards, she went on a hiatus from acting for over 20 years. In 2006, Sandweiss starred in Satan's Playground. The following year, she appeared in My Name Is Bruce. In 2013, Sandweiss had a cameo role in Sam Raimi's Oz the Great and Powerful. In 2016, Sandweiss reprised her role as Cheryl Williams in Ash vs. Evil Dead, the character being reborn as a Deadite after a Kandarian demon possesses a photo of her.

== Personal life ==
Sandweiss has performed in musical theatre as a dancer and pop singer, and in a one-woman show of Jewish music.

== Filmography ==
Year	Film	Role	Notes
1976	The Case of the Topanga Pearl	Sophisticated crime boss/Temptress	Short film
1978	Shemp Eats the Moon	The Snake	Short film
1979	Within the Woods	Ellen	Short film
1981	The Evil Dead	Cheryl Williams	
2006	Satan's Playground	Paula	
2007	My Name Is Bruce	Cheryl	
2007	Brutal Massacre: A Comedy	Natalie Vasquez	
2007	The Dread	Diane	
2009	Dangerous Women	Cheryl	6 episodes
2009	Dark Fields	Mandy	
2010	The Other Way	Guest #1	Short
2013	Oz the Great and Powerful	Quadling Woman	Cameo
2013	Evil Dead	Cheryl Williams	Voice cameo
2016	Ash vs Evil Dead	Cheryl Williams	2 episodes
2019	Sundowners	Dana	Short

=== Video games ===
Year	Title	Role
2022	Evil Dead: The Game	Cheryl Williams
