= Edwin Neal =

American actor (born 1945)

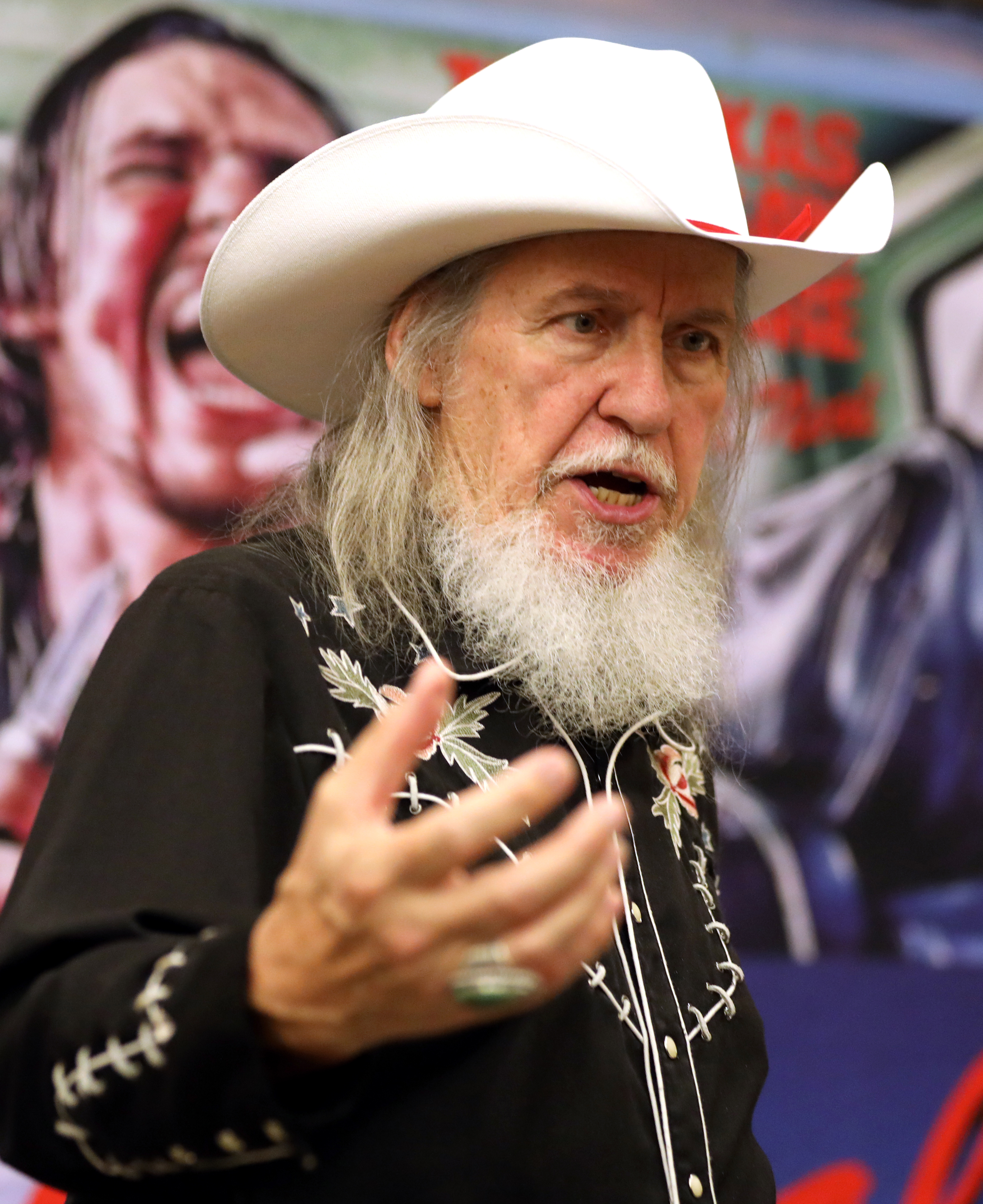
- Edwin Neal in 2024
- Born: Joseph Edwin Neal Jr. July 12, 1945 (age 81); Houston, Texas, U.S.
- Occupation: Actor
- Years active: 1972–present

Joseph Edwin Neal Jr. (born July 12, 1945) is an American actor. He is best known for his role as the hitchhiker in The Texas Chain Saw Massacre and has been a voice talent, appearing on screen and off, including Ghor in Metroid Prime 3: Corruption and Two-Face, Killer Croc, and Harvey Bullock in DC Universe Online. Neal set a record of doing 26 different voices in the only completely unedited version of all 105 episodes of Gatchaman (Battle of the Planets), which included the lead villain Berg Katse.

== Early life and career ==
Neal, after high school, studied at Lon Morris College in Jacksonville, Texas. While there, he auditioned for the role of the Hitchhiker in The Texas Chain Saw Massacre, and got it. He has said that, when auditioning, he acted as an eccentric relative of his. The film gained major popularity over the years and went on to become a cult classic.

Neal continues to act. His most notable roles since The Texas Chain Saw Massacre were playing the Mercer interrogator in JFK and one of Big Chuck's Henchmen in the 1993 film My Boyfriend's Back. He has also done voice work for films, video games, and animated series. Neal annually tours worldwide making many public appearances as the Hitchhiker character at horror conventions and related gatherings.

== Honors ==
Neal was inducted into the "Hollywood Horror Hall of Fame" in 1993 alongside Vincent Price, and owns one of the world's largest film poster collections, from the year 1900 to the present day. He received a Bronze Star for Valor during his service during the Vietnam War in 1969.

== Filmography ==
=== Film ===
- The Texas Chain Saw Massacre (1974) – Nubbins Sawyer
- Future-Kill (1985) – Splatter
- My Two Loves (1986) – Telephone Man
- Good Girl, Bad Girl (1990)
- JFK (1991) – Mercer
- My Boyfriend's Back (1993) – Big Chuck's Henchman
- The American Nightmare (2000) – self
- Mr Hell (2001) – Freemont
- The M.O. Of M.I. (2002) – Bill
- Zombiegeddon (2003) – God
- Murder-Set-Pieces (2004) – Good Samaritan
- Mr. Hell (2005) – Toxic Waste Worker
- Satan's Playground (2006) – Boy
- The Man Who Came Back (2007) – Ugly guard
- It Came from Trafalgar (2008) – Chester
- Holy Hell (2009) – Bolton
- Love Lost in a Boat – Narrator
- Dropping Evil (2012) – President Strode
- Butcher Boys (2013) – Freddy
- Kill or Be Killed (2014) – Bargsley
- The Best Laid Plans (2019) – Jimmy

=== Anime ===
- Blade of the Phantom Master
- Final Fantasy: Unlimited – Pist Shaz
- Gatchaman – Berg Katse (ADV dub)
- Gatchaman: The Movie – Berg Katse (BTVA Award for Best male supporting vocal performance in an anime movie/special)
- GetBackers - Mr. Sasakida
- Getter Robo Armageddon - Gai
- Happy Lesson - Tanuki
- Jing: King of Bandits - Emcee
- Lost Universe – Drunk, Barker, Superintendent General, Roy Glen
- Mazinger – Professor Morimori, Nuke
- Moeyo Ken TV – Nekomaru
- Nadia: The Secret of Blue Water – Jean's Uncle, Newspaper Editor
- Ninja Resurrection – Souiken Mori
- Sakura Wars – Financier, Gojii
- Sonic the Hedgehog: The Movie – Dr. Robotnik, President, Metal Robotnik
- Soul Hunter – Lisei
- Steam Detectives – Dr. Guilty
- Wedding Peach – Jamapon
- Zaion: I Wish You Were Here – Dr. Domeki

=== Video games ===
Year	Title	Role	Notes
1991	Wing Commander II: Vengeance of the Kilrathi	The Emperor (voice)	
1995	Crusader: No Remorse	Dr. Gregor Hoffman (voice)	
2000	Starlancer	Admiral Petrov	
2001	Conquest: Frontier Wars	Spinelayer, ESP Coil, Troopship	
2003	Deus Ex: Invisible War	Generic Citizen No. 5, WTO Guard #1	
2007	Metroid Prime 3: Corruption	Ghor, Trooper, Noncom	
2011	DC Universe Online	Two-Face, Killer Croc, Harvey Bullock	
2023	The Texas Chain Saw Massacre	The Hitchhiker	
