= Caesar and Otto's Summer Camp Massacre =

- Film poster
- Directed by: Dave Campfield
- Written by: Dave Campfield
- Produced by: David M. Brunsman; Dave Campfield
- Starring: Dave Campfield; Paul Chomicki; Felissa Rose; Deron Miller; Joe Estevez; Brinke Stevens
- Cinematography: Christian Voss
- Music by: Bruce Kiesling
- Distributed by: Wild Eye Releasing
- Release date: August 15, 2009 (Fright Night Film Fest)
- Running time: 76 minutes
- Country: United States
- Language: English
- Box office: $25,840

Caesar and Otto's Summer Camp Massacre is a 2009 American comedy slasher film and spoof of the Sleepaway Camp film series, starring Dave Campfield, Paul Chomicki, Felissa Rose, Deron Miller, Joe Estevez, Ken Macfarlane and Brinke Stevens and was written and directed by Dave Campfield, the creator of the original Caesar and Otto film.

Caesar and Otto's Summer Camp Massacre made its world premiere on August 15, 2009 at the Fright Night Film Fest in Louisville, Kentucky, where it received a nomination for Best Horror Comedy. It then went on to screen at the Long Island Film Festival on October 9, where it won Best Editing. It was then screened on June 4, 2010 at the Lighthouse Film Festival, and released on DVD on October 4, 2011.

Caesar and Otto's Summer Camp Massacre was the debut feature of Trai Byers who rose to fame in 2015 with the success of Fox's Empire.

== Plot ==
Caesar, an effete tough guy and his slovenly half brother, Otto, have signed up as summer camp counselors. When the mysterious Carrie shows up, the other counselors start disappearing one by one.

== Cast ==
- Dave Campfield as Caesar
- Paul Chomicki as Otto
- Felissa Rose as Carrie
- Trai Byers as Chip

== Reception ==
Corey Danna of Horror News Network called Caesar and Otto's Summer Camp Massacre "a silly little movie" that is "made to entertain and it hits the spot". Brandon Long of Pop Horror said "if Abbott and Costello were alive today, this would be their crossover with the 1983 cult classic, Sleepaway Camp."

According to Scott A. Johnson of Dread Central "Caesar and Otto's Summer Camp Massacre has some genuinely funny moments coupled with some real groaner style humor that makes it great to watch if there's plenty of alcohol."
