= Torture Chamber =

- Theatrical film poster
- Directed by: Dante Tomaselli
- Written by: Dante Tomaselli
- Produced by: Milka Stanisic; Dante Tomaselli
- Starring: Vincent Pastore; Christie Sanford; Lynn Lowry; Carmen LoPorto; Danny Lopes
- Cinematography: Timothy Naylor
- Edited by: Marcus Bonilla
- Music by: Kenneth Lampl; Allison Piccioni; Dante Tomaselli
- Release date: October 10, 2013 (Sitges Film Festival)
- Language: English

Torture Chamber is a 2013 horror film written and directed by Dante Tomaselli. The movie first released on October 10, 2013 at the Sitges Film Festival and was released onto DVD on January 28, 2014. The film stars Vincent Pastore, Christie Sanford, and Lynn Lowry, and follows a family trying to save a teen boy from demonic possession. This marks a change from Tomaselli's usual horror formula, as prior films showed adults in the role of monster.

== Synopsis ==
13-year-old burn victim Jimmy Morgan (Carmen LoPorto) isn't happy. When he starts exhibiting strange powers, he begins to use them on all of the people that he believes has looked down upon him or did him wrong. His brother Mark (Richard D. Busser) tries desperately to use his skills as a Catholic priest to save Jimmy, but is wildly unsuccessful. Not only does Jimmy manage to escape, but he also transforms the town's children into a bloodthirsty army that drags its prey to an abandoned castle. There Jimmy and the children torture their captives in extremely disturbing and horrific ways.

== Cast ==
- Vincent Pastore as Dr. Fiore
- Christie Sanford as Mrs. Morgan
- Lynn Lowry as Lisa Marino
- Carmen LoPorto as Jimmy Morgan
- Ron Millkie as Dr. Thompson
- Richard D. Busser as Father Mark Morgan
- Ellie Pettit as Heather
- Steven Lobman as Andy
- Raine Brown as Hope
- Danny Lopes as Ralph

== Reception ==
Critical reception for Torture Chamber has been mostly positive, with many reviewers stating that the film would have a limited appeal to viewers expecting a more mainstream horror film. Fearnet and Ain't It Cool News both criticized the film's acting but praised the film overall, with Fearnet calling it "a messy, scrappy, sometimes silly horror film that occasionally taps into something old-school scary." In contrast, Fangoria's Chris Alexander and AV Maniacs both praised the film's acting, with Alexander stating that the movie "traps its audience in an environment and won't let them go until it's finished with them."
