= Detroit–Windsor =

Coordinates: 42.3225°N 83.0468°W

- Transborder agglomeration
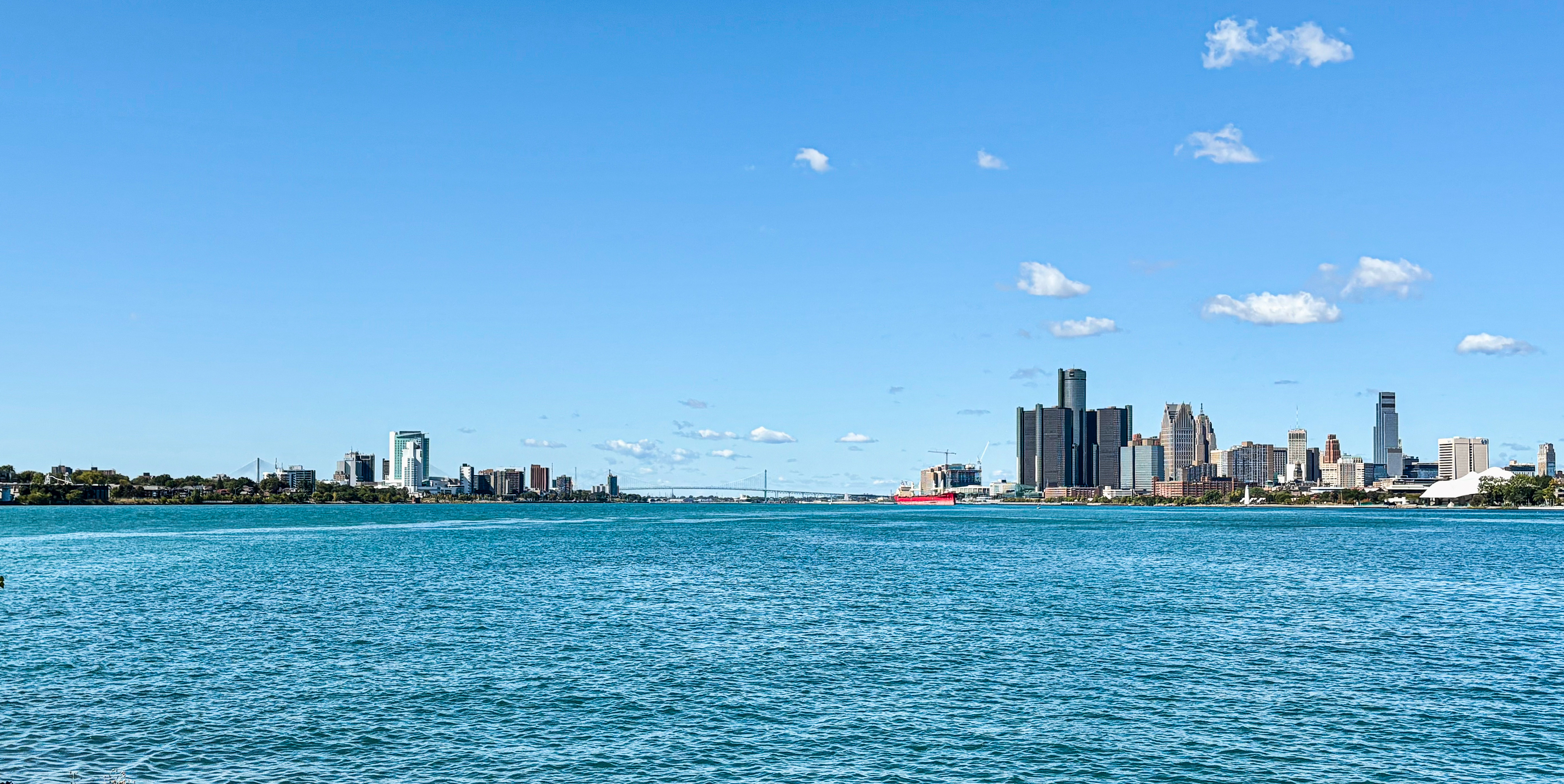
- Detroit skyline to the right and Windsor to the left of the Detroit River, with the Ambassador Bridge partially visible in the background from Belle Isle
Interactive Map of Detroit–Windsor Area
In the United States:
City of Detroit
Detroit–Dearborn–Livonia Met Division
Warren–Troy–Farmington Hills Met Division
Flint, Mich. MSA
Ann Arbor, Mich. MSA
Monroe, Mich. MSA
Adrian, Mich. µSA
In Canada:
City of Windsor
Essex County, Ont.
Lambton County, Ont.
Municipality of Chatham-Kent, Ont.
- Country: Canada; United States
- State/Province: Ontario; Michigan; Ohio
- Principal cities: Detroit, Mich. Windsor, Ont. Warren, Mich. Ann Arbor, Mich. Flint, Mich.
- Elevation: 180 m (600 ft)

Population (2019)
  - Metro: 5,976,595 (16th in the Americas)
- Time zone: UTC−5 (EST)
  - Summer (DST): UTC−4 (EDT)

The Detroit–Windsor region is an international transborder agglomeration named for the American city of Detroit, Michigan, the Canadian city of Windsor, Ontario, and the Detroit River, which separates them. The Detroit–Windsor area acts as a critical commercial link straddling the Canada–United States border and has a total population of 5,976,595. It is the largest cross-border conurbation in the western hemisphere.

The Detroit–Windsor area covers the southeastern Michigan counties of St. Clair, Macomb, Lapeer, Genesee, Livingston, Oakland, Washtenaw, Monroe and Wayne; as well as the southern Ontario counties of Essex, Lambton, Chatham-Kent, and the City of Windsor.

== Overview ==
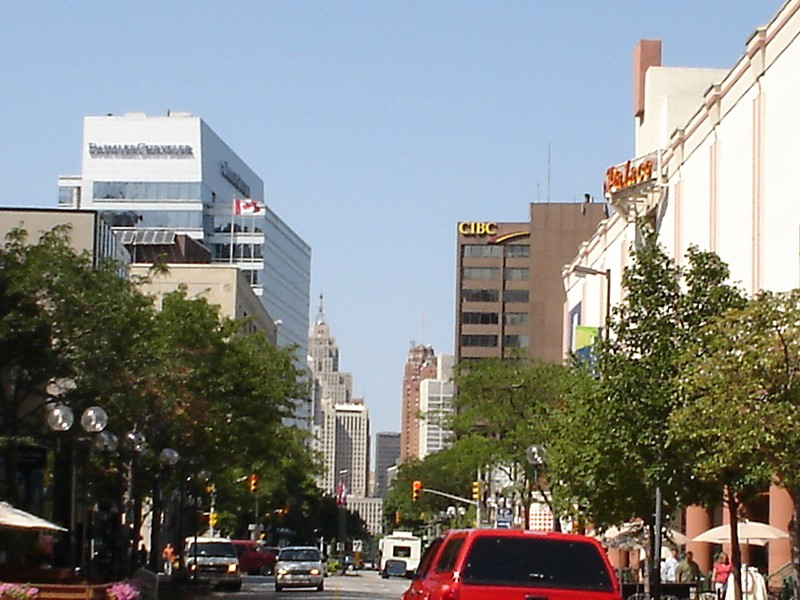
View from Ouellette Avenue in Windsor to the north across the river to Detroit's Guardian (right) and Penobscot Building (left) cityscape.

The Detroit–Windsor region is not accounted for as a single metropolitan area by the U.S. or Canadian government. If it were, the region would be the eighth most populous urban region in North America. Nevertheless, the communities have been historically tied by several partnerships and agreements, including the Detroit and Windsor Tunnel Corporation, the firm that is owned equally by the City of Detroit and City of Windsor and operates the tunnel. The cities are historically linked through the rise of the auto industry in both countries due to the U.S.-Canadian Auto Pact in the 1960s, and share geopolitical concerns affecting transportation and shared resources, such as the Detroit River. Many federal, state and provincial bi-national agreements affecting trade and border security also link the region. Today, increasing governmental co-operation is being formalized. On June 15, 2012, the construction of a new bridge between Windsor and Detroit was announced in the two cities by Canadian Prime Minister Stephen Harper, Transport Minister Denis Lebel and Michigan Governor Rick Snyder. The bridge announcement was a long-anticipated formalization of a new partnership between Canada and Michigan, with Canada paying the entire Michigan share of the new bridge, including a new interchange with Interstate 75. The joint Royal Canadian Mounted Police and U.S. Coast Guard Shiprider program of marine border security are examples. The increasing interdependence of Detroit–Windsor was recognized by U.S. regional business and government in 2007 when Windsor Mayor Eddie Francis was invited to take part in, and speak at, the annual Mackinac Policy Conference, a committee of regional business and political leaders, developed to address the economic and quality of life concerns that matter most to Southeast Michigan.

== Economy ==
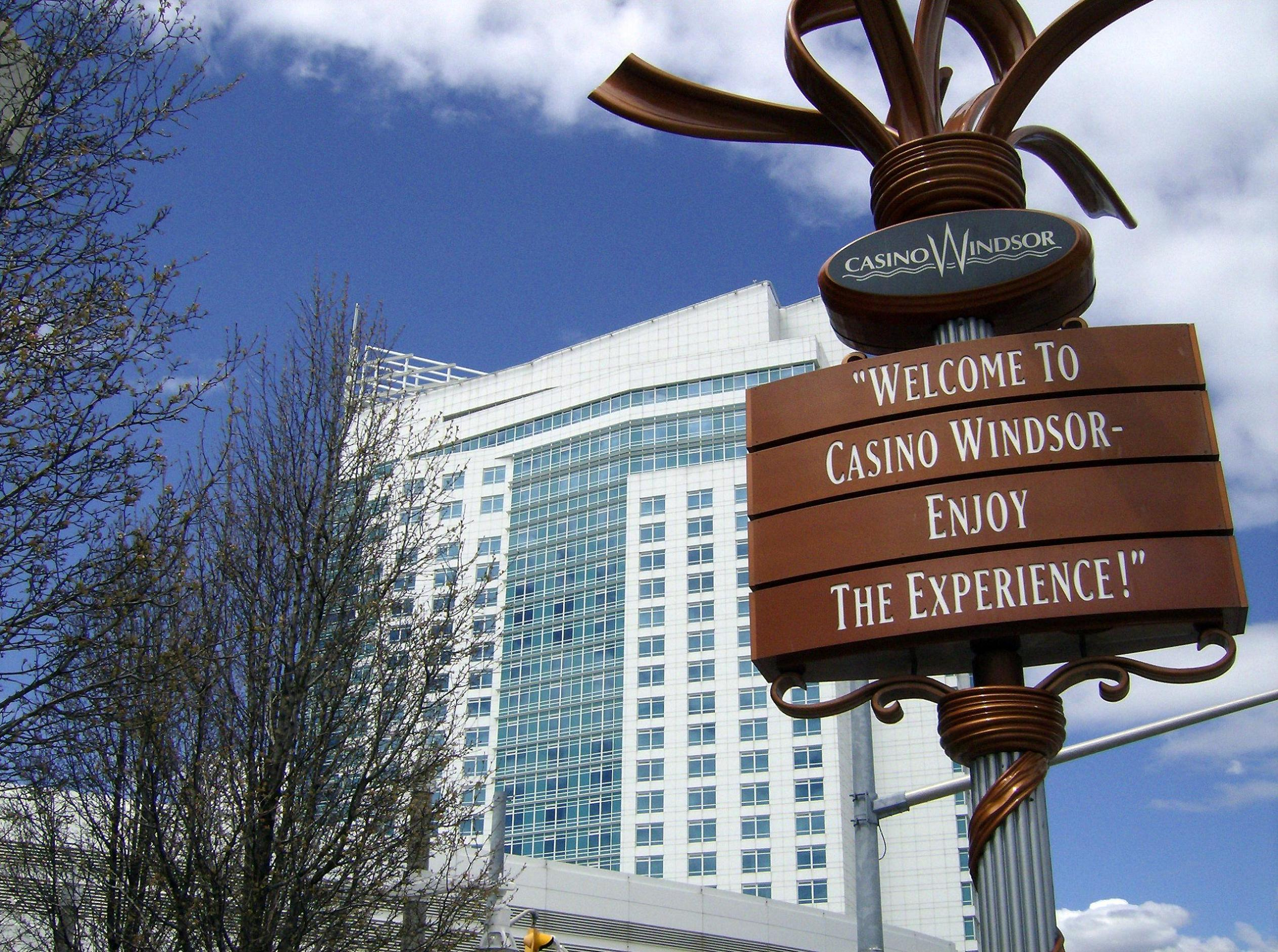
Casino Windsor (now Caesars Windsor) was a major contributing factor to Detroit's legalization of casino gaming.

Detroit is home to the Big Three automobile companies. As a result, Windsor is home to the Chrysler Canada Headquarters and car plants for two of the "Big Three". The city of Detroit has experienced severe economic difficulties over the years. Population loss has been occurring continuously since the 1950s, so that the population has declined more than 60% since its peak, poverty and crime have become significant problems, and at least 50,000 of the city's structures are abandoned. The affluent suburbs, however, are magnets for immigrants, wealth, and population growth. Windsor's economy is reliant on the automotive industry, but has diversified. As an example, Caesars Windsor casino, the largest in Canada, attracts visitors from the Metro Detroit region. In fact, Kwame Kilpatrick stated that Detroit is transitioning "from a manufacturing economy to a casino economy" in his re-election campaign.

Moreover, Windsor's economy has continued to diversify with several hundred green-energy jobs having been created as of June 2011. More capital investment in the city is expected, especially in the aerospace and air cargo industry. Windsor Airport is currently undergoing a major expansion, with an aircraft maintenance and repair hangar being constructed, as well as cargo facilities for air to rail/road transport.

Many people commute across the Detroit–Windsor International border daily. Professions identified in the 1988 Free Trade Act are permitted TN Visas for legal work in the United States and Canada. As an example, over 5,000 Windsor residents work, in the healthcare industry, and 16,000 overall in Metro Detroit as such, the industry is one of Windsor's largest indirect employers. One of the largest U.S. law firms, Miller, Canfield, Paddock and Stone P.L.C., has offices in both Windsor and Detroit.

A 2004 Border Transportation Partnership study showed that 257,000 jobs in Michigan and $13 billion in annual production depend on the Detroit–Windsor international border crossing. With many new businesses in the suburbs, the region is competitive in emerging technologies including biotechnology, nanotechnology, information technology, and hydrogen fuel cell development.

== Demographics ==
Together, the two metropolitan areas have a population of almost 6,000,000 people, with 5.4 million in the Detroit area, 375,000 people in Essex County (Windsor), 125,000 in Lambton County (Sarnia), and 110,000 in Chatham-Kent, Ontario. It is the second largest border region in the world, after Kinshasa-Brazzaville in Central Africa, with some 5,700,000 people living in its metropolitan area. The Detroit side contains over one-half of the population of Michigan, whereas Windsor and Sarnia contain only two percent of Ontario's population. An estimated 46 million people, nearly 16% of the U.S. population, live within a 480 km (300 mi) radius of the area, with other metropolitan areas within this radius, such as Toronto, Ontario; Hamilton, Ontario; Buffalo, New York; Erie, Pennsylvania; Cleveland, Ohio; Akron, Ohio; Toledo, Ohio; Columbus, Ohio; Cincinnati, Ohio; Indianapolis, Indiana; Northern Kentucky; Grand Rapids, Michigan; London, Ontario; Regional Municipality of Waterloo, Ontario; Flint, Michigan; Saginaw, Michigan; Milwaukee, Wisconsin, and Chicago, Illinois.

While about four-fifths of the population of Metro Detroit lives outside the city itself, Windsor has a balanced population between the city of Windsor itself and the rest of Essex County. The Detroit metro area comprises over 200 cities, villages and townships ranging in population from the hundreds to the hundreds of thousands. On the Canadian side there is only eight official municipalities (with Windsor being a recent separated municipality), consisting of LaSalle (pop. 30,200), Tecumseh (pop. 23,200), Amherstburg (pop. 22,000), Lakeshore (pop. 36,611) Leamington-Kingsville (pop. 49,150) and Windsor itself (pop. 229,660). Within each of these municipalities lie several smaller communities that serve as bedroom communities for Windsor's working force. Windsor has recently been given a boost by immigration. However, Detroit itself has less than half of its peak population.

== See also ==
- Ambassador Bridge
- Detroit–Windsor Tunnel
- Detroit International Riverfront
- Golden Horseshoe
- Gordie Howe International Bridge
- Great Lakes Megalopolis
- Quebec City–Windsor Corridor
- Windsor–Detroit International Freedom Festival
- Detroit Windsor International Film Festival
- Detroit River International Wildlife Refuge
