= Dante Tomaselli =

American film director

- Born: October 29, 1969 (age 56); Paterson, New Jersey, U.S.
- Education: Pratt Institute, New York School of Visual Arts
- Occupations: Director, screenwriter, score composer
- Relatives: Alfred Sole (cousin)

Dante Tomaselli (born October 29, 1969) is an Italian-American film director, screenwriter, and score composer. Known for his "unique and eccentric" work in the horror genre, he was named one of Fearnet's "Favorite Underrated Horror Directors" in 2013.

== Biography ==
Tomaselli was born on October 29, 1969, in Paterson, New Jersey. He expressed interest in becoming a horror filmmaker while he was still a child, due to his enjoyment of films such as The Exorcist and Don't Look Now, which he watched with his mother at local theaters.

Tomaselli studied filmmaking at Brooklyn's Pratt Institute and later transferred to the New York School of Visual Arts, where he achieved a BFA in Advertising. His debut feature, Desecration, which he based on a previous 23-minute short, was released in 1999.

On January 14, 2014, Tomaselli released his first CD of electronic horror music, Scream in the Dark, through Elite Entertainment and MVD Audio.

He is openly gay.

== Themes and influences ==
Tomaselli often utilizes themes of Catholicism and Christianity in his work, partly inspired by his Catholic upbringing as a child; though he is critical of the concept of religion as a whole. Other factors that have influenced his work include his familial relation to Alfred Sole and his interest in surrealism, as well as severe nightmares he had as a child. Some critics mistakenly attribute Dario Argento and Lucio Fulci as direct influences on Tomaselli, but Tomaselli has stated that he did not view those directors' films until his early twenties.

== Reception ==
Critical reception to Tomaselli's films is usually very polarized, with some criticizing the films as lacking linear plot lines; while other critics have praised them for this feature.

== Discography ==
- Scream in the Dark (2014)
- The Doll (2014)
- Nightmare (2015)
- Witches (2017)
- Out-Of-Body Experience (2019)
- Holy Terror (2025)

== Filmography ==
Year	Film	Director	Producer	Writer	Composer	Notes
1999	Desecration	Yes	Yes	Yes	Yes	
2002	Horror	Yes	Yes	Yes	Yes	
2006	Satan's Playground	Yes	No	Yes	Yes	
2012	Torture Chamber	Yes	Yes	Yes	Yes	
