= Big Gus, What's the Fuss? =

Big Gus, What's The Fuss?
- Film poster
- Directed by: Ami Artzi; Lloyd Kaufman
- Written by: Ami Artzi; Lloyd Kaufman
- Produced by: Ami Artzi; Lloyd Kaufman
- Starring: Ilan Dar; Yosef Shiloach; Dubi Gal; Sassi Keshet; Elisheva Michaeli
- Cinematography: Hassa Wollich
- Edited by: Dov Hoenig
- Music by: Beni Nagari
- Distributed by: Troma Entertainment
- Release date: 1973
- Running time: 94 minutes
- Country: Israel
- Language: Hebrew

Big Gus, What's the Fuss? (also known as Ha-Balash Ha'Amitz Shvartz, Schwartz: The Brave Detective and Fat Spy) is a 1973 Israeli comedy film written and directed by Ami Artzi and American director Lloyd Kaufman, the president of Troma Entertainment. The plot revolves around a Hebrew detective named Gus and his partner Harry who are hired by a woman to investigate a possible case of adultery.

The film was not released commercially until 2009, as an Easter egg on The Sexy Box, a DVD boxset of Squeeze Play!, Waitress!, Stuck on You! and The First Turn-On!

== Production ==
The idea of Big Gus came from producer Ami Artzi, who convinced Lloyd Kaufman and Michael Herz that making a comedy movie in Israel would be a sure-fire hit. Artzi assured Kaufman that Israel was eager to make films, enough so to give filmmakers extra funds, and that if a movie were to be released there, everyone in the country would go see it. The promise that a G-rated Hebrew family film showing in American synagogues would be successful as well also contributed to two versions being filmed: a version in Hebrew and a version in English. Kaufman, Herz, and friend Andy Slack (the future president of NBC News) wrote the script.

Kaufman and Herz flew to Tel Aviv and received from Artzi an English rewrite of their script. The Israeli co-producers insisted Artzi co-direct.

The day Big Gus opened in theatres, war broke out in Israel. Kaufman and Herz tried renting out the film for showings in American synagogues; out of thousands, only a few accepted. The film has never been released on video. However, Troma Studios, Kaufman's production company, has made the film available for digital download at its store website.

The film's editor, Dov Hoenig, went on to work in Hollywood and was nominated for an Academy Award in 1993 for editing The Fugitive.
