= Make Your Own Damn Movie! =

2005 film by Lloyd Kaufman

Make Your Own Damn Movie!: Secrets of a Renegade Director
- DVD Box Set
- Author: Lloyd Kaufman; Adam Jahnke; Trent Haaga
- Language: English
- Subject: Cinema
- Publisher: St. Martin's Press
- Publication date: 2003
- Publication place: United States
- Media type: print Paperback
- Pages: 352
- ISBN: 0-312-28864-6
- OCLC: 50072358
- Dewey Decimal: 791.43/023 21
- LC Class: PN1995.9.P7 K385 2003
- Preceded by: All I Need to Know About Filmmaking I Learned from The Toxic Avenger

Make Your Own Damn Movie! is both a book and a DVD set about Troma Entertainment and independent film in general.

== Book ==
Make Your Own Damn Movie!: Secrets of a Renegade Director is written by Lloyd Kaufman (with Adam Jahnke and Trent Haaga) published by St. Martin's, in 2003. Kaufman is the co-founder of B-movie company Troma Entertainment and the director of such films as The Toxic Avenger, Class of Nuke 'Em High, and Terror Firmer.

Kaufman and Haaga had previously collaborated on the 1999 film Terror Firmer and the 2001 film Citizen Toxie: The Toxic Avenger IV.

The A.V. Club called the book

"...mildly hilarious, not to mention full of actual useful advice for the would-be indie filmmaker struggling with a lack of experience and a nonexistent budget."

Publishers Weekly stated,

"It is to the tremendous credit of Kaufman's profane, self-deprecating, caustic but charismatic sense of humor that the book's opening, closing and everything else in between manages to make the low-budget filmmaking process seem like the most glorious and noble of life pursuits."

The foreword to the book was written by South Park co-creator Trey Parker. The introduction was penned by frequent Kaufman collaborator James Gunn. Gunn had previously co-written All I Need to Know About Filmmaking I Learned from The Toxic Avenger with Kaufman.

== DVD set ==
In 2005, Kaufman and Troma decided to expand the book into a 5 DVD set. The set, with more than 18 hours of material, includes advice and interviews with Trey Parker and Matt Stone, George A. Romero, Stan Lee, John G. Avildsen, Eli Roth, James Gunn.

The set also includes Kaufman's first major film The Battle of Love's Return. in a deconstructed version. This was the only DVD version of the film until 2009, when the film was released as an Easter Egg on The Sexy Box, a DVD boxset of Squeeze Play!, Waitress!, Stuck on You! and The First Turn-On!.

== DVD series ==
Troma also released a DVD series under the Make Your Own Damn Movie title that showcases amateur films by young filmmakers. However, the only film released to date is Pot Zombies.

== Editions ==
- ISBN 0-312-28864-6 (paperback, 2003)
- ASIN B0009E27SK (DVD 2005)
