= The Battle of Love's Return =

1971 film by Lloyd Kaufman

- Original release poster
- Directed by: Lloyd Kaufman
- Written by: Lloyd Kaufman
- Produced by: Garrard Glenn; Lloyd Kaufman; Frank Vitale
- Starring: Lloyd Kaufman; Lynn Lowry; Andy Kay; Stanley Kaufman; Oliver Stone
- Cinematography: Frank Vitale
- Edited by: Lloyd Kaufman
- Music by: André Golino; Lloyd Kaufman
- Distributed by: Troma Entertainment
- Release date: June 1971
- Running time: 82 minutes
- Language: English
- Budget: $8,000

The Battle of Love's Return is a 1971 American comedy film written, directed, produced, and starring Lloyd Kaufman, the co-founder of Troma Entertainment, his first major film after his student production The Girl Who Returned.

== Plot ==
Abacrombie is a down-on-his-luck loser. After being fired from his job, he sets out on a quest to find himself, encountering a variety of oddball characters who only make it harder for him. Sooner or later, he stumbles upon the girl of his dreams, and he is determined to overcome his stupidity and win her heart.

== Reception ==
The film was favorably reviewed by Howard Thompson of The New York Times and Judith Crist of New York Magazine, who compared Kaufman to Woody Allen and Mel Brooks.

The worst review, however, came from Kaufman's father: when asked what his favorite part was, he responded "the part where Lloyd gets killed".

== Home media ==
The film has never been released on DVD individually, but is included in its entirety (and as a deconstructed version) on Kaufman's instructional box set, Make Your Own Damn Movie!, and is included as an Easter Egg on The Sexy Box, a DVD boxset of Squeeze Play!, Waitress!, Stuck on You! and The First Turn-On!.

== Production notes ==
- Future directors Allan Moyle and Oliver Stone worked on the film as an A.D. and an actor, respectively.
- During filming of the battle scene, which was shot in a meadow in the backyard of Kaufman's mother's house, a smoke bomb ignited a large patch of grass and grew out of control, almost destroying the neighbors' house before the fire department arrived just in time. Mrs. Kaufman was not pleased.
- To promote the film, Kaufman and friends would run around New York City with a stencil of the film's logo and spraypaint it on streets and sidewalks.

== See also ==
- List of American films of 1971
