= Michael Herz (producer) =

American film producer, director and screenwriter

- Born: May 9, 1949 (age 77); New York City, U.S.
- Occupations: Film producer; director; screenwriter

Michael Herz (born May 9, 1949) is an American film producer, director and screenwriter. With the director and actor Lloyd Kaufman, the two are the co-founders of Troma Entertainment, the world's longest running independent film studio, known for their comedic horror films, including the cult Toxic Avenger series (1984–2000) and Tromeo and Juliet (1996).

== Life and career ==
Herz and Kaufman first met when both of them were attending Yale University. Initially, the two didn't get along; Kaufman has stated that the only reason the two hung out with each other was that Herz owned a pinball machine and Kaufman was the only person in their dormitory who owned a television. Regardless, he was cast in a small part in Kaufman's first feature film, The Girl Who Returned.

After graduating from Yale, Herz went on to study law at New York University. Although he was quite adept at the subject, he secretly harbored a desire to become a screenwriter. His girlfriend Maris, who was a friend of Lloyd Kaufman's, took Herz to see Cry Uncle!, a film that Kaufman served as a production manager on. Impressed, Herz contacted Kaufman and was hired for the production of the 1973 film Sugar Cookies.

In 1974, Kaufman and Herz formed Troma Entertainment. Together, they co-directed and co-produced all of Troma's original movies from 1979's Squeeze Play! to 1990's Sgt. Kabukiman N.Y.P.D., when Herz relinquished control of the director's chair to focus on the business end of Troma Studios.

Herz is known to be shy, allowing the more charismatic Kaufman to be the public face of Troma. Apart from brief appearances in the Class of Nuke 'Em High series, Herz has remained behind the scenes. Whenever a Troma promotional video called for an appearance by Herz or when Kaufman was not available, the character of 'Michael Herz' was played by Troma's iconic 500-pound actor Joe Fleishaker.

With his wife Maris, they have one daughter, Sloane.

== Filmography ==
=== As a director and producer ===
- Waitress! (1981)
- Stuck on You! (1982) (also co-writer)
- The First Turn-On! (1983) (also co-writer)
- The Toxic Avenger (1984)
- Class of Nuke 'Em High (1986) (also actor)
- Troma's War (1988)
- The Toxic Avenger Part II (1989) (also actor)
- The Toxic Avenger Part III: The Last Temptation of Toxie (1989)
- Sgt. Kabukiman N.Y.P.D. (1990)

=== As a producer ===
- Squeeze Play! (1979)
- Mother's Day (1980)
- The Dark Side of Midnight (1984)
- Igor & The Lunatics (1985)
- Screamplay (1985)
- Class of Nuke 'Em High (1986)
- Girl School Screamers (1986)
- Combat Shock (1986)
- Lust for Freedom (1987)
- Fortress of Amerikkka (1989)
- Class of Nuke 'Em High Part II: Subhumanoid Meltdown (1991) (also actor)
- Class of Nuke 'Em High 3: The Good, the Bad and the Subhumanoid (1994) (also actor)
- Blondes Have More Guns (1995)
- Tromeo and Juliet (1996)
- Sucker: The Vampire (1998)
- Terror Firmer (1999)
- The Rowdy Girls (2000)
- Citizen Toxie: The Toxic Avenger IV (2000)
- All the Love You Cannes! (2002)
- Doggie Tails: Lucky's First Sleep-Over (2003)
- Parts of the Family (2003)
- Tales from the Crapper (2004)
- Make Your Own Damn Movie! (2005)
- Slaughter Party (2005)
- Poultrygeist: Night of the Chicken Dead (2006)
- Dancing into the Future (2007)
- Kickball: The Movie! (2008)
- Return to Nuke 'Em High Volume 1 (2013)
- The Toxic Avenger (2023)
