= The Girl Who Returned =

- Directed by: Lloyd Kaufman
- Written by: Robert Schacteland; Lloyd Kaufman
- Produced by: Lloyd Kaufman
- Starring: Gretchen Herman; Beverly Galley; Tim McClean; Judith Dresh; Letha Baker
- Cinematography: Lloyd Kaufman
- Music by: Jake Thompson; Lloyd Kaufman
- Distributed by: Troma Entertainment
- Release date: 1969
- Running time: 66 minutes
- Country: United States
- Language: English
- Budget: $2,000

The Girl Who Returned is a 1969 American comedy film, notable as the directorial debut of Lloyd Kaufman, future co-founder and president of Troma Entertainment. It was made during his sophomore year at Yale University.

== Plot ==
The story is set in an alternate reality in which the world is made up of just two countries: Luxembourg and Mongolia. Luxembourg is inhabited only by women and Mongolia only by men. Every four years, the two countries hold an Olympics competition to determine the supremacy of the world.

== Overview ==
The film was shot on a Bolex camera which did not have a sound sync and could only record forty seconds at a time. The film features a rare cameo from Troma co-founder Michael Herz and his wife Maris.

What the film lacked in a coherent plot, it made up for in endless gratuitous shots of scantily clad women exercising. The film received negative reviews from campus newspapers and Lloyd Kaufman himself described the film as "boring", going so far as to say that, like the infinite monkey theorem, "if you put two monkeys in a room with movie cameras they will make The Girl Who Returned in twelve days."

Filmed on a budget of $2,000, The Girl Who Returned made a profit from dollar screenings at Yale and other colleges. Other than these showings, the film was not released commercially until 2009, as an easter egg on The Sexy Box, a DVD boxset of Squeeze Play!, Waitress!, Stuck on You!, and The First Turn-On!.

In December 2016, the film made its debut on the Troma Now streaming service.

== See also ==
- List of American films of 1969
