= Troma's War =

- Theatrical release poster
- Directed by: Michael Herz; Lloyd Kaufman
- Written by: Lloyd Kaufman
- Produced by: Michael Herz; Lloyd Kaufman
- Starring: Carolyn Beauchamp; Sean Bowen; Michael Ryder; Patrick Weathers; Jessica Dublin; Ara Romanoff
- Cinematography: James Lebovitz
- Edited by: Brian Sternkopf
- Music by: Christopher De Marco
- Production company: Troma Entertainment
- Distributed by: Troma Entertainment
- Release dates: October 1988 (Tokyo); December 9, 1988
- Running time: 104 minutes
- Country: United States
- Languages: English; German; Spanish
- Budget: $2 million

Troma's War, also known as 1,000 Ways to Die in the United States, is a 1988 American action-adventure comedy film written by Lloyd Kaufman and Mitchell Dana and directed by Michael Herz and Kaufman (credited as Samuel Weil). It began production in 1986 and was released in theaters in 1988 shortly after Class of Nuke 'Em High was done making its rounds at the box office.

== Plot ==
After a commercial airliner crashes on an uncharted island, the surviving passengers, a multi-cultural cross-section of the US population with some of them coming from Tromaville, notice armed uniformed people of various countries apparently looking for survivors. When one of passengers surrenders herself, she is brutally shot. It becomes evident that the island is a terrorist infiltration camp. When passenger Parker, a tough, slightly unstable Nam vet, manages to kill one of the attackers, he and the fellow passenger, everyman Taylor, lead the other survivors to a safe haven, only to have part of their number captured. Brought to a training base, the captured are forced to watch a neo-Nazi horrifically murder an air steward and a priest. The remaining passengers gather what weapons they can find and make a rough attempt at storming the camp in hopes of recovering their lost friends. At the camp, a musician's girlfriend is shot and killed by an obese terrorist wielding an AK-47 assault rifle. The bandleader, Sean, attacks and loses a fight with the Nazi, and the rocker's female bandmate is taken away to be attacked and raped by "Señor Sida" (Mr. AIDS), leader of the AIDS brigade who hope to begin an American AIDS epidemic.

Meanwhile, an attractive African-American woman is taken to the brains of the operation, a pair of Nazi twins conjoined at the head. Parker and Taylor lead the remaining passengers in a surprise attack on the terrorists' hideout. Sida is dispatched by his victim via a crossbow bolt in the scrotum. Having been transformed by her experience, the African-American lady hunts down the Twins and violently hacks them apart with a machete. She then goes after a terrorist who tried to have his way with her and stuffs a grenade in his mouth.

Realizing the terrorists' are prepared to invade America and spread both carnage and AIDS, the remaining survivors are motivated to take steps in attacking the terrorists' main headquarters the next morning. Later that night, the formerly hostile Taylor and Lydia share an intimate moment. The men prepare to storm the camp but refuse to let the women go with them so they don't put their lives at risk. Hardwick, a depressed widower, volunteers to drive a truck full of explosives into a cargo boat hauling the terrorists into the United States. Hardwick however is shot down, ruining their plan. The Americans do their best, eliminating mass numbers of the enemy. Running out of ammo, the group awaits their last moments when the females ride in and help kill off the terrorists. A timid, morbidly obese passenger named Cooney musters his courage and decides to fill Hardwick's role. He fights his way through the terrorists blocking his way, until he gets to the truck. Just as the boat is taking off, Cooney drives the truck off a ramp into the boat, destroying it. The unlikely heroes mourn the loss of Cooney, until he appears unharmed, having ditched the truck at the last minute.

With the terrorists defeated, America saved, and knowing rescue will soon come the heroes all let out a jubilant cry of "America!".

== Cast ==
- Carolyn Beauchamp as Lydia
- Sean Bowen as Taylor
- Michael Ryder as Parker
- Patrick Weathers as Kirkland
- Jessica Dublin as Dottie
- Ara Romanoff as Cooney
- Paolo Frassanito as Señor Sida
- Steven Crossley as Marshall
- Lorayn Lane Deluca as Maria
- Charles Kay Hune as Hardwick
- Brenda Brock as Kim
- Lisa Patruno as Jennifer
- Alex Cserhart as Sean
- Aleida Harris as Nancy
- Mary Yorio as Laurie

== Production ==
After finding success in such films as The Toxic Avenger and Class of Nuke 'Em High, Troma began production on what was intended as a criticism of President Ronald Reagan's attempt to glamorize armed conflict.

Troma's War's budget was $3 million, making it Troma's most expensive film to date.

== Release ==
The film premiered at the Tokyo International Fantastic Film Festival in October 1988 before receiving a limited release on December 9, 1988 in New York City.

The film was initially rejected by the MPAA as too violent to even receive an R rating, so several scenes were cut from to the film, including the entire AIDS subplot. Despite this, the film was rejected a second time leading to even heavier cuts. According to Lloyd Kaufman, Richard Heffner, the president of the MPAA at the time, told Michael Herz over the phone that the film was “no fucking good”.

=== Critical reception ===
A review from Comeuppance Reviews gives the film three stars, stating "Troma's War puts a spin on the wilderness shoot-em-ups we’ve become so used to, and we welcome it." Horrornews.net notes in their positive review: "A must-see for fans of trash cinema."

== Home media ==
An "Unrated Director's Cut", with a runtime of 104 minutes, was released on DVD on January 26, 2010 and was released on Blu-ray on August 18, 2015. The heavily edited cut, with a runtime of 89 minutes, was released on VHS and laserdisc.
