= Dialing for Dingbats =

- Directed by: Peter Slodczyk
- Produced by: Michael Solton; Lloyd Kaufman
- Starring: John Caponera; Marta Dargham; Michael Jeffries; Johnny Mask; Lyn Segerblom; Roger Rodd
- Distributed by: Troma Entertainment
- Release date: 1989
- Running time: 81 minutes
- Language: English

Dialing for Dingbats is a 1989 romantic comedy directed by Peter Slodczyk and distributed by Troma Entertainment. The distribution company describes the film as "light hearted".

== Plot ==
Randy, a lonely and shy man, meets a woman through a party line but communication problems complicate their date.

== Reception ==
The film was considered "the first serious examination of the world of dingbats on the phone" by the Orlando Sentinel. A retrospective very negative review states that "This film couldn’t have been made in any other time than the late 80s, and not just for the snapshot of the bygone pre-internet dating scene mechanisms. It has a colorful VHS-era kitsch and an ungodly amount of earnest but bad jokes to the point it becomes surrealistic. The film takes too many detours to fill up the slight seventy-eight minute running time, with both commercial parodies and actual footage from other Troma films shoehorned in."

All I Need to Know about Filmmaking I Learned from the Toxic Avenger (co-written by Kaufman and James Gunn) stated that "Troma tackles yet another socially important issue with the addiction of 1-900 party lines. This is the first film about phone sex."
