= A Nymphoid Barbarian in Dinosaur Hell =

1990 film directed by Brett Piper

- Promotional release poster
- Directed by: Brett Piper
- Written by: Brett Piper
- Produced by: Brett Piper; Alex Pirnie
- Starring: Linda Corwin; Paul Guzzi; Alex Pirnie; Mark Deshaies; K. Alan Hodder; Ryan Piper; Scott Ferro; Rick Stewart; Russ Greene
- Production company: Troma Entertainment
- Release date: 1990
- Running time: 90 minutes
- Country: United States
- Language: English

A Nymphoid Barbarian in Dinosaur Hell is a 1990 American science fiction film written and directed by Brett Piper and produced by Troma Entertainment. It premiered at the 1990 Cannes Film Festival.

== Plot ==
The last woman on Earth has to deal with lizard men, a tyrant, monstrous mutant animals, and a love interest.

== Production ==
A Nymphoid Barbarian in Dinosaur Hell was originally titled Dark Fortress. The film either cost US$40,000 or US$5,000. Director Brett Piper, who was also responsible for the special effects, used puppets that were about ten inches (25 cm) long. One of the puppets created by Piper is a bat-like creature that is based on the 1962 film Jack the Giant Killer. Piper said that all of the scenes with animation were completed within a few days. The jaws of a snake-like monster called the "Tromasaurus" consisted of mostly Styrofoam and the teenaged daughter of co-producer Al Pirnie operated them in a few parts.

== Release ==
Co-founder of Troma Entertainment Lloyd Kaufman said about its premiere at the 1990 Cannes Film Festival that "no one else was dumb enough to do a dinosaur movie".

=== Home media ===
The film aired on the USA Network in the early 1990s. The DVD release has film trailers, an interview with Kaufman, two Troma PSAs, Troma film clips, a dance titled Radiation March, and advertisements for Troma-related material. DVD Talk's Adam Tyner said of the DVD, "The video is full-frame, grainy, and poorly authored, with nasty artifacts throughout. The print used is awful, even warranting a complaint in the commentary, and it looks about the same as the version I saw on the USA Network around '92." It was the most viewed film on Hulu on the March 2, 2010, weekend which Kaufman attributed to its title.

== Reception ==
Tyner of DVD Talk wrote, "Although A Nymphoid Barbarian in Dinosaur Hell isn't really a Troma movie in the usual sense and the movie itself is so boring that it borders on unwatchable, the commentary really is worth paying full retail for." Author Mark F. Berry said that the film has "no quest, no goal, no story arc whatsoever".
