= All the Love You Cannes! =

2002 documentary film

- Directed by: Sean McGrath; Lloyd Kaufman; Gabriel Friedman
- Written by: Sean McGrath; Lloyd Kaufman; Gabriel Friedman
- Produced by: Gabriel Friedman; Michael Herz; Lloyd Kaufman; Sean McGrath
- Cinematography: Mark Colegrove; Lloyd Kaufman
- Edited by: Sean McGrath
- Production company: Troma Entertainment
- Distributed by: Troma Entertainment
- Release date: May 16, 2002 (Cannes)
- Running time: 83 minutes
- Country: United States
- Language: English

All the Love You Cannes! (credited onscreen as All the Love You Cannes: An Indie's Guide to the Cannes Film Festival) is a 2002 documentary comedy film co-directed by Sean McGrath, Lloyd Kaufman and Gabriel Friedman. The film documents Troma Entertainment's annual pilgrimage to the Cannes Film Festival in order to take on what they describe as "the elitist media conglomerates" and features interviews with Quentin Tarantino and Claude Chabrol.

Troma are currently working on a follow-up, entitled Occupy Cannes.
