= Lloyd Kaufman =

American film director (born 1945)

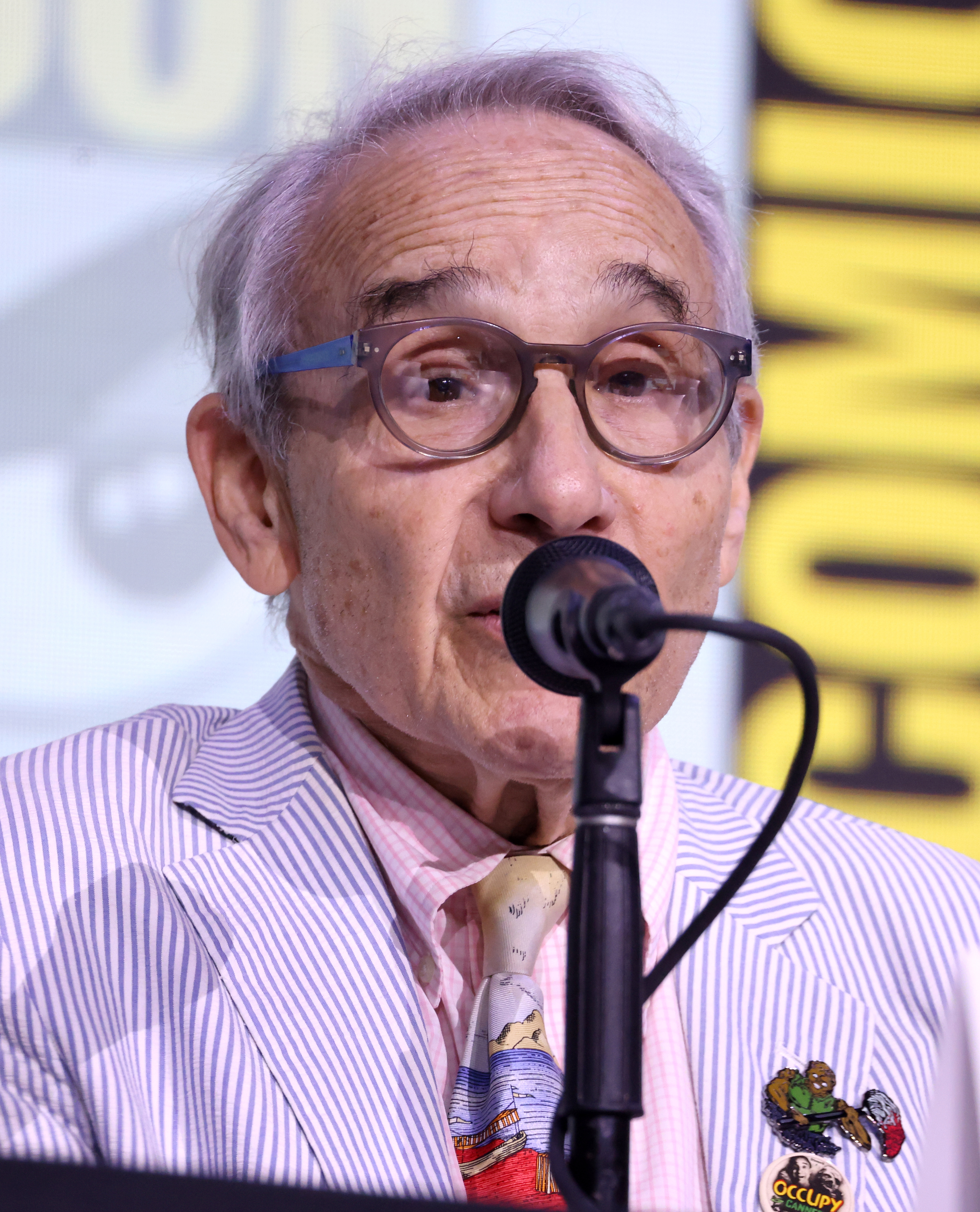
- Kaufman in 2025
- Born: Stanley Lloyd Kaufman Jr. December 30, 1945 (age 80); New York City, U.S.
- Other names: Louis Su; Samuel Weil
- Education: Yale University (BA)
- Occupations: Film director; film producer; screenwriter; actor
- Years active: 1969–present
- Style: Comedy horror
- Spouse: Pat Swinney Kaufman (m. 1974)
- Children: 3

Stanley Lloyd Kaufman Jr. (born December 30, 1945) is an American film director, screenwriter, producer and actor. Alongside producer Michael Herz, he is the co-founder of Troma Entertainment film studio, and the director of many of their feature films, such as The Toxic Avenger (1984) and Tromeo and Juliet (1996). Many of the strategies employed by him at Troma have been credited with making the film industry significantly more accessible and decentralized.

== Early life ==
Kaufman was born to a Jewish family in New York City, the son of Ruth (née Fried) and Stanley Lloyd Kaufman Sr., a lawyer.

== Career ==
=== Early career ===
Kaufman graduated from Yale University with the class of 1968, where he majored in Chinese studies. His fellow Yale classmates included Oliver Stone and George W. Bush. Originally intending to become a social worker, he became fast friends with student filmmakers Robert Edelstein and Eric Sherman (son of filmmaker Vincent Sherman), who introduced him to his future lifelong obsession: cinema. Some of Lloyd's favorite filmmakers include John Ford, Kenji Mizoguchi, Ernst Lubitsch, Stan Brakhage, and Franklin Schaffner.

In 1966, Lloyd went on a hiatus from his studies and spent a year in Chad for USAID as a pathfinder for the Peace Corps.

Returning to Yale, he produced Robert Edelstein's low-budget film Rappaccini and directed his own first feature film, an experimental black and white film titled The Girl Who Returned (1969). The film was presented at film societies at Yale, Harvard, and other east coast institutions. Following his graduation, Kaufman went on to work for Cannon Films, where he met John G. Avildsen (future Academy Award-winning director of Rocky and The Karate Kid.) The two collaborated for several years, making low-budget films including Joe (1970) and Cry Uncle! (1971). During this period, Kaufman also directed and starred in his second feature film, The Battle of Love's Return (1971), which garnered positive reviews in publications such as The New York Times; wrote and co-produced the lesbian thriller Sugar Cookies (1973) with Oliver Stone; and wrote and directed the Israeli comedy flop Big Gus, What's the Fuss? (1973). Kaufman also served as executive in charge of locations for Saturday Night Fever (1977), and was influential in choosing 2001 Odyssey as the nightclub in the film.

From 1973 to 1979, Kaufman produced and directed a handful of adult films in New York under the pseudonym "Louis Su". He directed at least three movies: The Divine Obsession, The Newcomers and Sweet & Sour, and has been credited for producing at least three more.

=== Troma Studios ===
In 1974, Kaufman and his business partner Michael Herz founded Troma Entertainment and began producing and distributing independent action and comedy films. In order to pay the bills, Kaufman did some freelance work for major Hollywood productions, including Rocky (edited on Troma's flatbed machines), Saturday Night Fever, and The Final Countdown, which he also produced (Kaufman has said that it was his experience on this film that made him never want to deal with a major studio again). From 1979 to 1981, the two wrote, produced and directed a series of profitable "sexy comedies" including Squeeze Play!, Waitress!, Stuck on You! and The First Turn-On!. On most of these early films, Kaufman is credited as "Samuel Weil." Kaufman also made a small appearance in Rocky and served as the production manager on Louis Malle's My Dinner with Andre.

In 1985, Troma experienced mainstream success with the violent, darkly comic superhero film The Toxic Avenger. Toxic went on to become Troma's most popular movie, inspiring two sequels, a fourth independent film sequel, a Saturday morning children's television show, comic books and tons of merchandise. The Toxic Avenger, or "Toxie", is now Troma's official mascot.

Kaufman's follow-up to The Toxic Avenger was Class of Nuke 'Em High, which he co-directed with Richard W. Haines. Riding on the success of the Toxic Avenger, Nuke 'Em inspired two sequels, a fourth independent film sequel, and a healthy run on late night cable shows such as USA Up All Night. At one time, Class of Nuke 'Em High was the highest-selling VHS for Troma.

Troma's popularity waned after the box office failure of Troma's War, a contributing factor to the company's collapse as a major film studio, forcing the Kaufman to eventually downsize his business into an independent film studio. Kaufman attributed the film's lack of success to cuts made to the movie after the MPAA refused to release it with an R-rating in its intended form. Troma's attempt to regain its popularity with the superhero satire Sgt. Kabukiman N.Y.P.D. was unsuccessful, failing to make an impression at the box office. From 1995 to 2000, Kaufman retrofitted the studio into an independent film company, finding success amongst cult movie fans and critics with the independent film Tromeo and Juliet (1996), a loose parody of Shakespeare's play. Other independent films that followed were the less successful and poorly reviewed. Terror Firmer (1999), a slasher film set on the set of a Troma movie (with Kaufman playing a caricature of himself), and the fourth installment, Citizen Toxie: The Toxic Avenger IV, which proved to be an ultimately unsuccessful revival of the series, both films failing to make an impression at the box office.

It was not long, however, before Troma once again experienced financial hardship, this time after the expensive botched funding of a low-budget video feature titled Tales from the Crapper, which cost $250,000 despite most of the footage being unusable. Kaufman supervised a reshoot in an attempt to salvage the film, dividing the footage into two parts, and recasting the film as a double-feature. Tales from the Crapper was released on DVD in September 2004.

Troma still produces and acquires independent films. Troma Films has distributed many films from third parties including Trey Parker's Cannibal! The Musical. Kaufman himself encourages independent filmmaking, making cameo appearances in low-budget horror films, often for free. Appearances include screen time in former collaborator James Gunn's directing debut, Slither, as well as Gunn's Super; and Mark Neveldine and Brian Taylor's Gamer.

Kaufman's long-time editor Gabriel Friedman co-directed and wrote the screenplay to his follow-up film, Poultrygeist: Night of the Chicken Dead, a musical zom-com which made its official New York premiere on May 9, 2008 (although the film had previewed numerous times on single screens for over a year). The film opened to positive reviews from Entertainment Weekly and The New York Times. Poultrygeist grossed $22,623 in the United States and Canada.

In September 2008, a staged musical version of The Toxic Avenger opened at the George Street Playhouse in New Brunswick, New Jersey. Directed by Tony Award winner John Rando, The Toxic Avenger Musical features music from Bon Jovi founding member, David Bryan. On September 17, 2009, Kaufman announced he would have a cameo in the remake of the Charles Kaufman/Troma movie Mother's Day alongside his brother Charles.

Kaufman is the subject of the book Toxic Schlock: Conversations with Lloyd Kaufman by Andrew J. Rausch and Chris Watson. An author himself, Kaufman has most recently been working on adding to his Your Own Damn Movie! series. Having completed Make Your Own Damn Movie!, Direct Your Own Damn Movie! and Produce Your Own Damn Movie!, he is now working on Sell Your Own Damn Movie!. Kaufman is the subject of the book Lloyd Kaufman: Interviews by Mathew Klickstein, an installment of the University Press of Mississippi's long-running Conversations with Filmmakers Series.

In 2010, Troma produced Father's Day, a shocking film from Canadian powerhouse Astron-6. Kaufman appeared on the Discovery Channel series, Oddities, in the tenth episode of the third season.

In 2012, Kaufman starred in the anthology horror film Horror House, playing Joe the Real Estate Agent in each of the film's five story scenarios.

On April 30, 2013, Kaufman appeared on an episode of Angry Video Game Nerd, reviewing the video game Toxic Crusaders on various consoles. Kaufman also appears in Angry Video Game Nerd: The Movie as himself, and was interviewed by James Rolfe.

In December 2013, Lloyd Kaufman revealed on the podcast Chimichanga Talk that he found lost behind-the-scenes footage of the film Rocky. Kaufman directed this footage and it was shot on Super-8. He also stated that he has completed a commentary of the footage and that it will be included in the 40th Anniversary release of Rocky on Blu-ray and DVD.

In 2013, Troma premiered Return to Class of Nuke 'Em High Vol.1 (2013) at the Cannes Film Festival. Return to Nuke 'Em High: Vol. 1 was a collaboration between Troma and Starz/Anchor Bay, it is also the first film Kaufman has directed on digital. The film has been well received premiering all over the world picking up awards and critical praise along the way. The New York Times stated "Powered by ribald bursts of bad taste and bodily fluids... The overall effect is [sic] joyous." Fangoria said "Return to Nuke 'Em High: Vol. 1 is undeniably funny, brave and so unlike anything else being put out today that it practically demands respect."

The Museum of Modern Art selected Return to Nuke 'Em High: Vol. 1 as part of its prestigious "Contenders" series - a collection of influential, innovative films made in the past 12 months that are believed will stand the test of time - honoring Kaufman along with fellow directors David Lynch, Woody Allen, the Coen Brothers and Sofia Coppola.

In 2020, Kaufman released #ShakespearesSh*tstorm, his iteration of William Shakespeare's The Tempest, a spiritual sequel to Tromeo and Juliet.

In 2021, Kaufman served as producer on Brandon Bassham's Slashening: The Final Beginning and Mercedes The Muses's Divide & Conquer.

== Filmography ==
=== As director ===
All films from Waitress to Sgt. Kabukiman N.Y.P.D. were co-directed with college friend and Troma Vice President Michael Herz

- The Girl Who Returned (1969)
- The Battle of Love's Return (1971)
- Big Gus, What's the Fuss? (1973) (co-directed by Ami Artzi)
- The New Comers (1973)
- Squeeze Play! (1979) (as Samuel Weil)
- Waitress! (1981) (as Samuel Weil)
- Stuck on You! (1982) (as Samuel Weil)
- The First Turn-On! (1983) (as Samuel Weil)
- The Toxic Avenger (1984) (as Samuel Weil)
- Class of Nuke 'Em High (1986) (as Samuel Weil; co-directed by Richard W. Haines)
- Troma's War (1988) (as Samuel Weil)
- The Toxic Avenger Part II (1989)
- The Toxic Avenger Part III: The Last Temptation of Toxie (1989)
- Sgt. Kabukiman N.Y.P.D. (1990)
- Tromeo and Juliet (1996)
- Terror Firmer (1999) (based on his book All I Need to Know About Filmmaking I Learned from The Toxic Avenger)
- Citizen Toxie: The Toxic Avenger IV (2000)
- All the Love You Cannes! (2002)
- Tales from the Crapper (2004)
- Make Your Own Damn Movie! (2005)
- Poultrygeist: Night of the Chicken Dead (2006)
- Return to Nuke 'Em High Volume 1 (2013)
- Grindsploitation: segment Untitled (2017)
- Return to Return to Nuke 'Em High AKA Volume 2 (2017)
- Shakespeare's Shitstorm (2020)
- Mr. Melvin (2025)

=== As producer only ===
- Sugar Cookies (1973)
- Silent Night, Bloody Night (1972)
- Mother's Day (1980)
- The Final Countdown (1980)
- The Dark Side of Midnight (1984)
- Screamplay (1985)
- Igor and the Lunatics (1985)
- Girls School Screamers (1986)
- Combat Shock (1986)
- Fortress of Amerikkka (1988)
- Dialing for Dingbats (1989)
- Class of Nuke 'Em High 2: Subhumanoid Meltdown (1991)
- Class of Nuke 'Em High 3: The Good, the Bad and the Subhumanoid (1994)
- DeCampitated (1998)
- Mother's Day (2010)
- Father's Day (2011)
- B.C. Butcher (2016)
- The Toxic Avenger: The Musical (2018)
- #ShakespearesShitstorm (2020)
- The Toxic Avenger (2023)

=== As actor ===
- The Battle of Love's Return (1971) - Abacrombie
- Cry Uncle! (1971) - Hippie #2
- The Love Thrill Murders (1971) - Squeegee
- Rocky (1976) - Drunk
- Slow Dancing in the Big City (1978) - Usher
- The Final Countdown (1980) - Commander Kaufman
- Rocky V (1990) - Drunk (Scenes Deleted)
- Cannes Man (1996) - Troma Chief
- Tromeo and Juliet (1996) - Bar Patron (Uncredited)
- Orgazmo (1997) - Doctor
- Terror Firmer (1999) - Larry Benjamin
- Citizen Toxie: The Toxic Avenger IV (2000) - Man in Public Service Announcement
- Tales from the Crapper (2004) - The Crap Keeper
- LolliLove (2004) - Father Lloyd
- Comic Book: The Movie (2004) - Himself (Uncredited)
- Frankenstein vs. the Creature from Blood Cove (2005) - Bar Drunk
- Pot Zombies (2005) - Pizza Delivery Dude
- Slither (2006) - Sad Drunk
- Poultrygeist: Night of the Chicken Dead (2006) - Old Arbie
- Bryan Loves You (2008) - Jonathan's Helper
- Crank: High Voltage (2009) - Maintenance Guy #2
- Gamer (2009) - Genericon
- The Uh-Oh! Show (2009) - Pimp
- Hanger (2009) - Melvina The Tranny
- Klown Kamp Massacre - Vic Vickers
- Super (2010) - 911 Man
- Hatchet II (2010) - Hunter
- Caesar and Otto's Deadly XMas (2011) - Grandpa Denovio
- The Gunstringer (2011) - Doc Lloyd
- Evil Head (2012) - Professor Raymond Knowby (Voice Only)
- LocoCycle (2013) - General Major Serje Krutsnetsoff
- Guardians of the Galaxy (2014) - Prisoner, cameo
- Angry Video Game Nerd: The Movie (2014) - Himself
- Dyke Hard (2014) - Dancer
- Ned Rifle (2014) - Zach
- The Fappening (2015) - Walter Plinge
- Milfs vs. Zombies (2015) - Melvin Brooks
- Killer Rack (2015) - Dr. Foin
- The Transfiguration (2016) - Hobo
- Spidarlings (2016) - Mr. Banner
- Blood Curse: The Haunting Of Alicia Stone (2016) - Alicia's Dad
- Iron Sky: The Coming Race (2016) - cameo
- Cell (2016) - cameo
- Graveyard Stories (2017) - The Host
- The Last Blockbuster (2020) - Himself
- The Suicide Squad (2021) - Dancing man in bar (uncredited cameo)
- Guardians of the Galaxy Vol. 3 (2023) - Gridlemop (voice, cameo)
- Vampire Zombies... from Space! (2024) - Public Masturbator
- The Gesuidouz (2025)
- Superman (2025) - Uncredited cameo

=== As narrator ===
- Human Hibachi 3: The Last Supper (2025) - Uncle Lloyd

== Books ==
- All I Need to Know about Filmmaking I Learned from The Toxic Avenger (with James Gunn)
- Make Your Own Damn Movie (with Adam Jahnke and Trent Haaga)
- The Toxic Avenger: The Novel (with Adam Jahnke)
- Direct Your Own Damn Movie (with Sara Antill and Kurly Tlapoyawa)
- Produce Your Own Damn Movie (with Ashley Wren Collins)
- Sell Your Own Damn Movie (with Sara Antill)
- Death by Umbrella! The 100 Weirdest Horror Movie Weapons (Foreword by Lloyd Kaufman)

== Bibliography ==
- All I Need to Know About Filmmaking I Learned from The Toxic Avenger with James Gunn (1998)
- Make Your Own Damn Movie: Secrets of a Renegade Director with Adam Jahnke and Trent Haaga (2003)
- The Toxic Avenger: The Novel with Adam Jahnke (2006)
