= Richard W. Haines =

American independent genre filmmaker and film historian

Richard W. Haines (born 1957) is an American independent genre filmmaker and film historian best known for his cult movies Space Avenger, Run for Cover in 3-D, and Splatter University, and the book Technicolor Movies.

== Biography ==
A 1979 graduate of the film school at NYU, Haines' first job was as an assistant editor for the low-budget 1980 exploitation film Mother's Day, directed by Charles Kaufman. This job led to a six-year association with Troma Entertainment as the company's post-production supervisor when Charles Kaufman sent Haines over to his brother Lloyd Kaufman after Haines satisfied them with his editing and sound editing work on the film.

Haines edited several films for Troma including the 1984 cult classic The Toxic Avenger.

During this period Haines also made his feature directorial debut independently with the widely known 1984 slasher film Splatter University. A testament to the cult popularity of Splatter University is the reference by the character Randy Meeks (played by Jamie Kennedy) in a phone conversation in Wes Craven's Scream 2 (1997). A slasher film with rare social and religious commentary as one of the more recent print reviews states, "Even some of the lesser ones have something interesting to offer, trying to go beyond the usual hack and slash routine. One such film surprisingly enough, is Splatter University...."

Following the commercial success of his first feature, Haines wrote a script titled Atomic High School, which he set up at Troma to direct as a work for hire under the title Class of Nuke 'Em High (1986). Following completion of Class of Nuke 'Em High, Haines left the exploitation field to form his own company, New Wave Film Distribution, Inc., which specializes in low-budget mainstream genre films. Haines retained complete creative control on all subsequent features producing, directing, writing, editing and marketing his productions.

The satirically violent sci-fi comedy Space Avenger (1989, co-written with Lynwood Sawyer) was the first film Haines made after going out on his own. The film was produced by the film restorer Robert A. Harris. Space Avenger received much attention within the film industry for being printed in the dye transfer Technicolor process, which yielded vibrant primary colors that never faded. Haines traveled to China to make prints of the film, a move which was covered by The Hollywood Reporter, Variety and Entertainment Tonight. The film was retitled Alien Space Avenger for its home video release.

Haines donated a Technicolor print to the George Eastman House and the Academy of Motion Picture Arts and Sciences archives as an example of dye transfer printing.

Haines' next project was the 1994 sci-fi thriller Head Games, followed by the action film Run for Cover (1995), which starred Adam West and featured the final film appearance of Viveca Lindfors. The film also included cameos from various well-known New York personalities such as Ed Koch and Rev. Al Sharpton. Run for Cover was shot in the Stereovision 3-D process and was the most successful film to ever play in Russia, as it had a five-year run. It was also premiered in Israel as part of a 3-D Festival Haines co-sponsored. Haines also co-sponsored a Technicolor Festival at the Paramount Center for the Arts in Peekskill, New York.

Haines is the author of two books, Technicolor Movies (1993) and The Moviegoing Experience, 1968-2001 (2003), and several articles published in Wide Gauge Film and Video Monthly and The Perfect Vision. The former is in its second printing. Haines was also the illustrator for the 2002 children's book Animal Kingdumb, written by his father, Richard D. Haines.

Haines' most recent features include the film noir Unsavory Characters (2001), the political satire Soft Money (2005), and a return to the horror genre, where he began his career, with What Really Frightens You (2008).

In 2012, Haines became a novelist. His first book, "Production Value", was released by Pigtown books. It's a thriller with a movie theme. His second novel, "Reel Danger", was released in 2013 also by Pigtown. It became part of his "24 Frames Per Second" suspense stories with continuing show biz characters based on people he worked with over the decades. The third book in the series, "The Anastasia Killer", was released in 2015.

== Filmography as director ==
- Splatter University (1984)
- Class of Nuke 'Em High (1986)
- Space Avenger (1989)
- Head Games (1994)
- Run for Cover (1995)
- Unsavory Characters (2001)
- Soft Money (2005)
- What Really Frightens You (2008)

== Books ==
- "Technicolor Movies" (1993)
- "Animal Kingdumb" by Richard D. Haines (illustrator) (2002)
- "The Moviegoing Experience, 1968-2001" (2003)
- "Production Value" (2012)
- "Reel Danger" (2013)
- "The Anastasia Killer" (2015)
- "Animal Kindumb" by Richard D. Haines (illustrator) Converted for 3D illustrations (2015)
- "What Really Frightens You Too" (2016)
- "What Really Frightens You III" (2017)
