= Shakespeare's Shitstorm =

- official movie poster
- Directed by: Lloyd Kaufman
- Screenplay by: Brandon Bassham
- Story by: Lloyd Kaufman; Gabriel Friedman; William Shakespeare
- Based on: The Tempest by William Shakespeare
- Produced by: John Patrick Brennan; Justin A. Martell
- Starring: Lloyd Kaufman; Kate McGarrigle; Amanda Flowers; Monique Dupree; Abraham Sparrow; Debbie Rochon; Erin Miller
- Cinematography: Lucas Pitassi
- Edited by: Seby X. Martinez
- Production company: Troma Entertainment
- Distributed by: Troma Entertainment
- Release date: August 29, 2020 (Fantasia)
- Running time: 94 minutes
- Country: United States
- Language: English

Shakespeare's Shitstorm (stylized as #ShakespearesShitstorm) is a 2020 American musical comedy horror film written and directed by Lloyd Kaufman. Produced by Troma Entertainment, it is a contemporary parody of William Shakespeare's The Tempest. The film had its world premiere at the 24th Fantasia International Film Festival on August 29, 2020.

== Plot ==
After being betrayed by his treacherous sister Antoinette and pharmaceutical big shot Al, scientist Prospero Duke swears revenge.

== Cast ==
- Lloyd Kaufman as Prospero Duke / Antoinette Duke
- Erin Miller as Ferdinand
- Kate McGarrigle as Miranda Duke
- Abraham Sparrow as Big Al
- Debbie Rochon as Senator Sebastian
- Amanda Flowers as Ariel
- Dylan Greenberg as Trini
- Monique Dupree as Caliban
- Dai Green as Cordelia
- Teresa Hui as Chien Wu Bang
- Zac Amico as Lindy West
- Bjarni Gautur as The Captain
- Mala Wright as Sycorax
- Vada Callisto as Puck
- Julie Anne Prescott as Hippolyta
- Frazer Brown as William Shakespeare
- Brandon Bassham as Francis Bacon
- Jakob Skrzypa as AvonBard Executive
- Luke Mitchell as AvonBard Executive
- Ming Chen as Busty AvonBard Executive

== Release ==
The film had its world premiere at the 24th Fantasia International Film Festival on August 29, 2020.

== Reception ==
A reviewer for Consequence remarked that the film delivered the cheap look, dumb jokes and gross-out imagery which appeals to those with the taste of teenagers and for which Troma is known. A reviewer for Dread Central said that the film provided horrible puns, disgusting gags and family fun.
