= Macabre Pair of Shorts =

1996 horror anthology film

- Directed by: Scott Mabbutt
- Produced by: Magick Films
- Music by: John Morgan
- Distributed by: Troma Entertainment
- Release date: 1996

Macabre Pair of Shorts is a 1996 horror anthology film directed by Scott Mabbutt. The film was produced by Magick Films and distributed by Troma Entertainment. It was the first credited film work of David Boreanaz.

== Production ==
The soundtrack was composed by John Morgan.

== Reception ==
A review on TV Guide states that with this film "Troma founders Lloyd Kaufman and Michael Herz continue to push forward into the realm of the bizarre, surreal, and campy". DVD Talk finds that "This is an appalling attempt at horror humor, degrading every aspect of the genre it wants to mimic and mock." An independent reviewer calls the film "a portmanteau within a portmanteau".
