= Sick Sock Monsters from Outer Space =

- Italian: Dolcezza Extrema
- Directed by: Alberto Genovese
- Written by: Massimo Vavassori
- Produced by: Alberto Genovese
- Starring: Marco Antonio Andolfi
- Music by: Antony Coia
- Production company: Loboarts Production
- Release date: January 2015
- Running time: 82 minutes
- Country: Italy
- Language: Italian/English

Sick Sock Monsters from Outer Space (original title: Dolcezza Extrema) is a 2015 Italian science fiction-horror film directed by Alberto Genovese. Its one live-action actor is Marco Antonio Andolfi; the remaining characters are represented by sock puppets. It was acquired for distribution in the United States by Troma Entertainment.

== Plot ==
In a galactic empire dedicated to a cult of fitness and beauty, the monarch Grigorio orders tanning showers delivered to all places of assembly on every planet in memory of the personal trainer Elfisio Masciago, who was electrocuted by a tanning lamp ten years before and has been elevated to the status of a martyr. Dolcezza Extrema, a pirate ship captained by the washed-up rock star and ex-convict Pixws and with a crew of recovering drug addicts, is assigned the mission. After their arrival on the planet Nemesis, Pixws comes to question his orders and a mutiny takes place.

== Production and distribution history ==
Genovese and his production company, Loboarts Production, produced Dolcezza Extrema in 2015 as their second full-length film after L'invasione degli AstroNazi. It was a "no-budget" production combining animation (including anime), horror and science fiction, using sock puppets made of recycled materials, but also using digital techniques. Marco Antonio Andolfi (Eddy Endolf) as the king is the only live-action protagonist; the cast also includes in voice parts Alessandro Bianchi (Bakterio Piloro), Giovanni De Giorgi (Pixws) and Paola Masciardi (Yomo). The film features violence and sexual debauchery and a fragmented plot.

In 2016 the film was acquired by Troma Entertainment for U.S. distribution on its streaming service under the title Sick Sock Monsters from Outer Space. It was released on Blu-ray in May 2018.

== Reception ==
The London International Festival of Science Fiction and Fantastic Film described Dolcezza Extrema as "quite simply insane". A reviewer for Cinema Italiano called it "an anarchic cinematic experiment, able to reach the viewer with the power of a virtual punch in the stomach". A reviewer on the Quinlan film website emphasised its "daring juxtapositions" and diversity of references (including Alien, Star Wars, Captain Harlock and The Muppet Show, and musically, science-fiction film scores and electronic music as well as grindcore and death metal) and found it "out of the box" even in the context of recent Italian independent film and "pleasantly amusing" despite the frustration of its "inevitably" loose plotting.

== Awards ==
- Official selection, Fantafestival 2015
- Best film: Weird and Wrong category, Broken Knuckle Film Festival 2015
- Official selection, London International Festival of Science Fiction and Fantastic Film 2016
- Official selection, Indie Film Festival, Switzerland
- Official selection, Lumiere Film Festival
- Best Trash Feature Film, The Optical Theatre Festival 2016
