= The Toxic Avenger (2023 film) =

American film by Macon Blair

The Toxic Avenger Unrated
- Theatrical release poster
- Directed by: Macon Blair
- Screenplay by: Macon Blair
- Based on: The Toxic Avenger by Lloyd Kaufman
- Produced by: Mary Parent; Alex Garcia; Lloyd Kaufman; Michael Herz
- Starring: Peter Dinklage; Jacob Tremblay; Taylour Paige; Julia Davis; Jonny Coyne; Elijah Wood; Kevin Bacon
- Cinematography: Dana Gonzales
- Edited by: Brett W. Bachman; James Thomas
- Music by: Will Blair; Brooke Blair
- Production companies: Legendary Pictures; Troma Entertainment, Inc.
- Distributed by: Cineverse (Note: Cineverse released with their Bloody Disgusting and Screambox labels.); Iconic Events Releasing
- Release dates: September 21, 2023 (Fantastic Fest); August 29, 2025 (United States and United Kingdom)
- Running time: 102 minutes
- Country: United States
- Language: English
- Box office: $3.5 million

The Toxic Avenger Unrated (Note: Released internationally as The Toxic Avenger Uncut, and known simply as The Toxic Avenger) is a 2023 American superhero black comedy film written and directed by Macon Blair. It is the fifth installment, a reboot of The Toxic Avenger film series, and a remake of the 1984 film. The film stars Peter Dinklage as the title character, alongside Jacob Tremblay, Taylour Paige, Julia Davis, Jonny Coyne, Elijah Wood, and Kevin Bacon.

The Toxic Avenger premiered as the opening film of Fantastic Fest on September 21, 2023, with a wider theatrical release followed by Cineverse and Iconic Events Releasing in the United States for August 29, 2025. The film received positive reviews from critics and grossed $3.5 million at the box office.

== Plot ==
When J.J. Doherty, who works at the corrupt pharmaceutical company BTH (Body Talk Healthstyle), sends secret information to an investigative reporter, they are attacked by The Killer Nutz gang working for BTH. The reporter is killed while J.J. escapes, angering the gang's manager, Fritz Garbinger.

In St. Roma's Village, BTH janitor Winston Gooze struggles to support his stepson Wade after Wade's mother dies of cancer. There is some strife as Wade is reluctant to see Winston as his father, particularly as Winston did not marry his mother. One day, Winston sees neighbour Daisy threatened by thug Spence to sell her property but does not intervene. BTH owner Bob Garbinger and assistant Kissy worry about his debts to mobster Thad Barkabus, Spence's father. When Fritz reports J.J.'s escape, Bob demands her capture.

Winston is desperate for medication to battle his brain disease and begs for help at a fundraiser hosted by Bob. He is locked out, so breaks into BTH to steal from the vault, and fashions a weapon from toxic sludge and a mop. He leaves as J.J. arrives to steal waste to expose BTH. The Killer Nutz chase J.J. into Winston and she drops a waste canister on Winston's money bag, incinerating it. The gang fatally shoot Winston and dump his body in toxic sludge. Revived as a mutant by the waste, Winston returns home and startles Wade. Spence is coercing Daisy into signing away her property when Winston falls onto Spence's car. Spence shoots him but Winston's mutated body ejects the bullet. Winston rips off his arm and Daisy retrieves the property transfer as police arrive and Winston escapes to the woods.

Winston encounters hermit Guthrie Stockins, who urges him to reveal his mutation to Wade. Winston returns and fights right-wing terrorists, The Nasty Lads, with his enchanted mop and becomes known as The Toxic Avenger. Wade, Bob and Fritz all recognize him as Winston, and Bob orders the Nutz to capture Winston to learn how to create Super Soldiers.

The Killer Nutz shoot J.J. in the stomach while kidnapping Wade. Winston heals her with his toxic blood and confronts The Killer Nutz at a concert, killing most of them. Winston and J.J. subdue the last surviving band member, who is also a victim of BTH chemical waste with a mutated, bean-sized head. They're captured in a raid on Bob's compound trying to rescue Wade and Winston is subjected to painful blood extraction to develop a serum to give Bob similar power.

Thad Barkabus demands his investment returned when the Mayor withdraws support from BTH. Bob drinks the untested serum, killing Thad and his men. Kissy, captivated by Bob's mutated form, drinks the remaining serum, mutates herself and attacks Fritz. Bob fights Winston as he tries to escape with J.J. and Bob is defeated. The mutated Kissy impales Winston and damages Fritz's throat, before she is defeated in turn by Winston.

Winston wakes in the hospital, hailed as a hero, his mutation curing his disease. Bob's crimes are exposed, Wade and J.J. are exonerated, and Fritz is arrested. The townspeople celebrate Winston, and he embraces Wade, affirming their bond as father and son.

In a post-credits scene, it is revealed that Kissy survived but is severely burned, while Winston breaks the fourth wall to teach the audience how to make a grilled cheese sandwich.

== Cast ==
Main cast of The Toxic Avenger
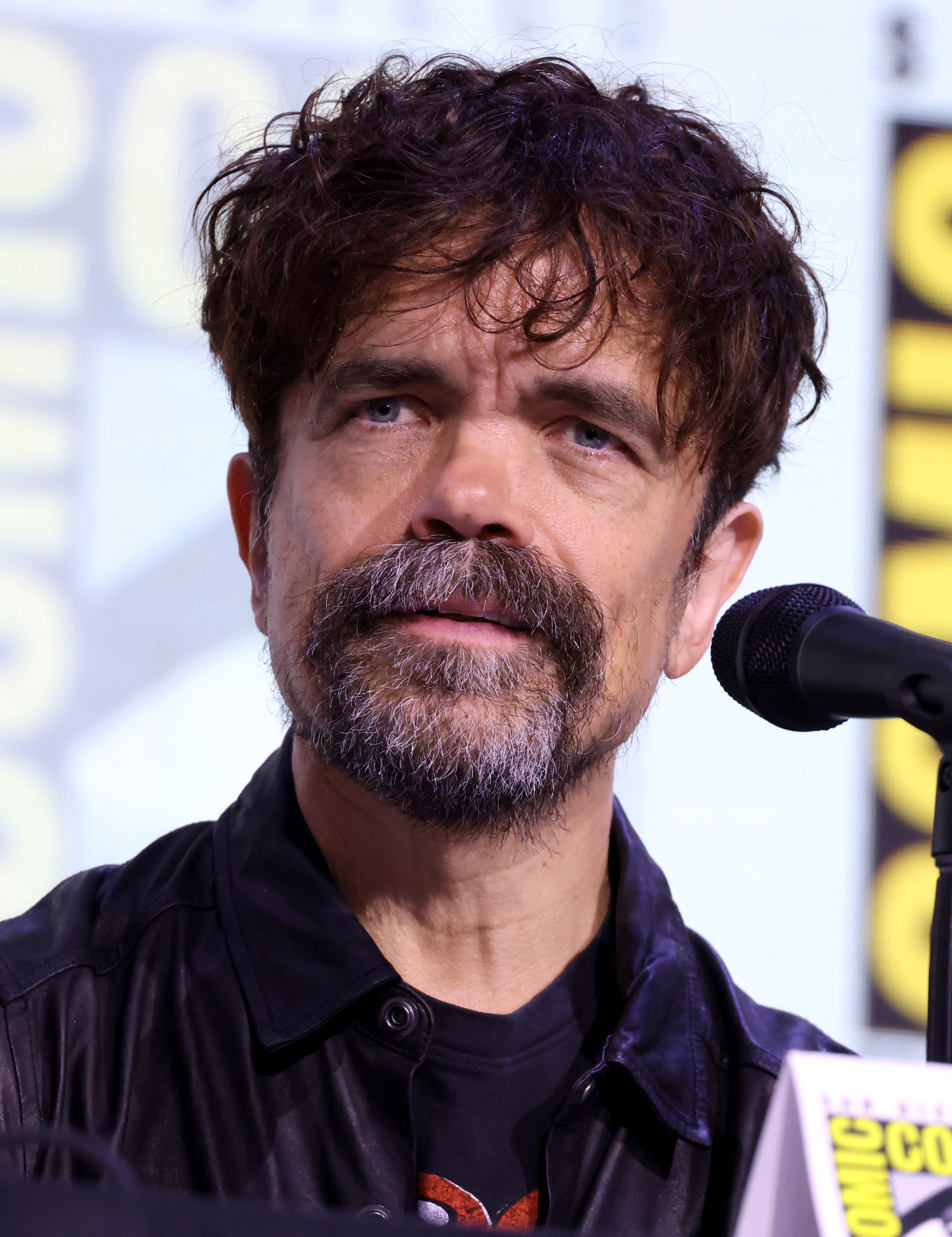
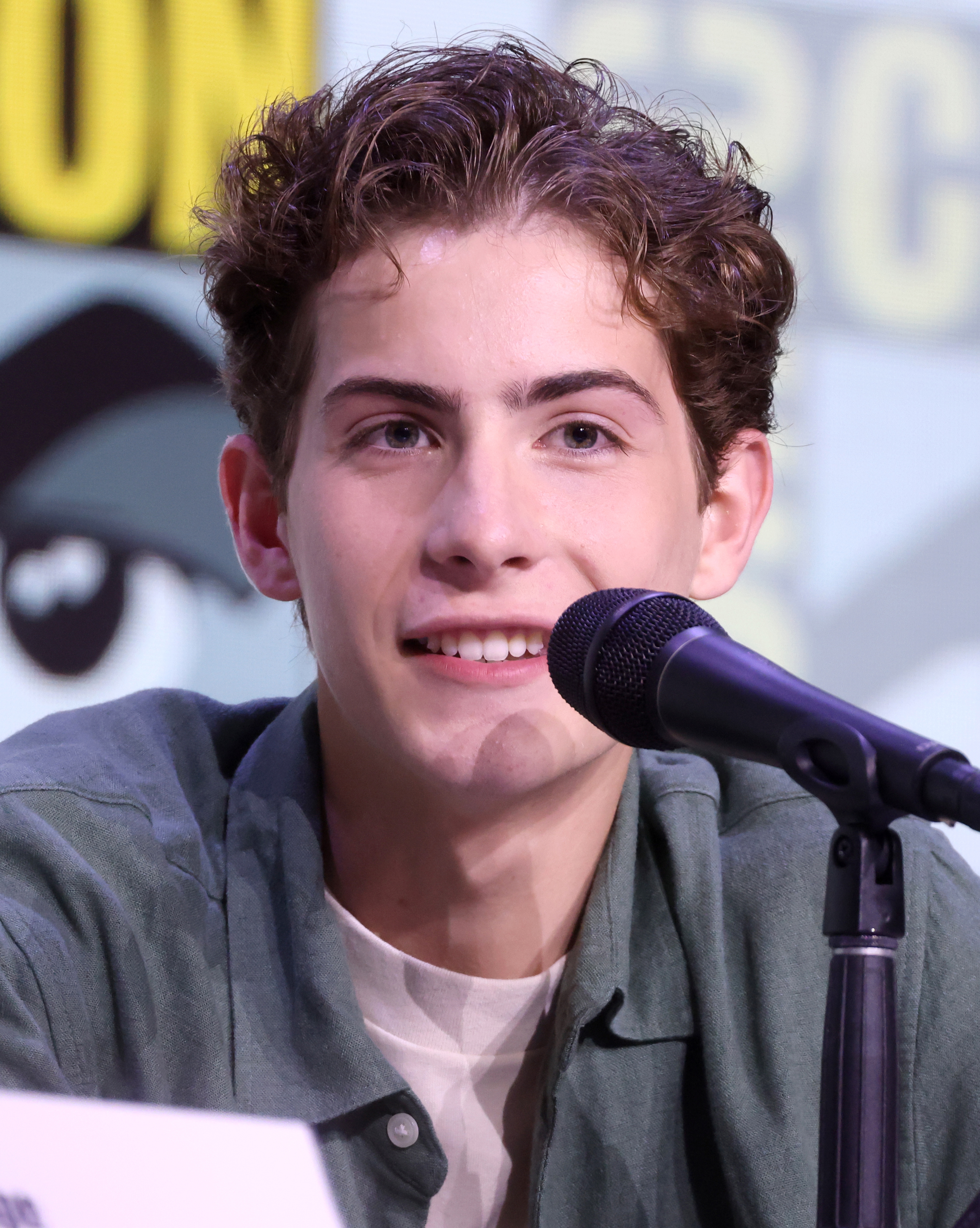
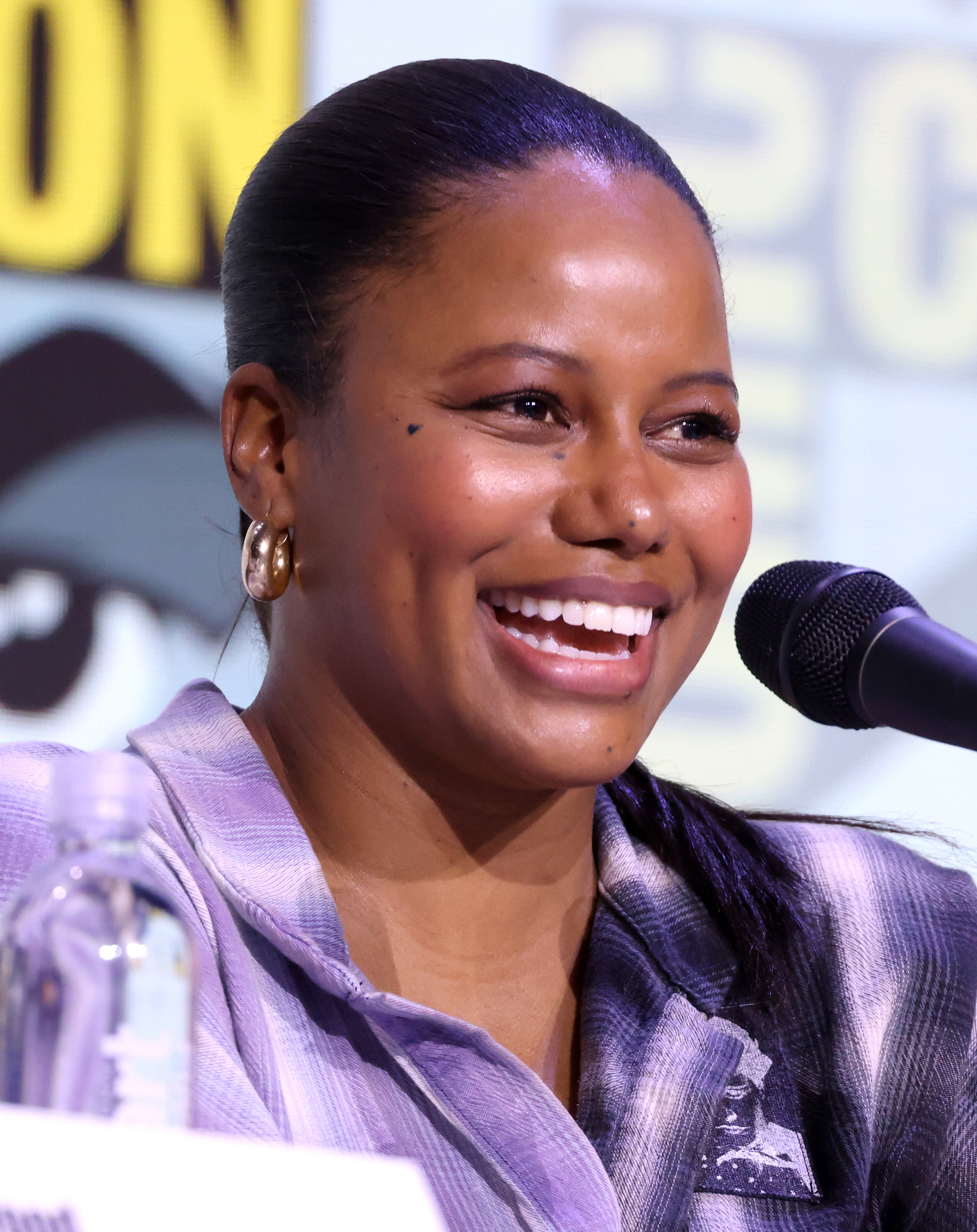
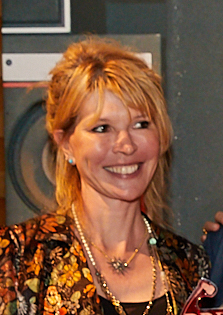
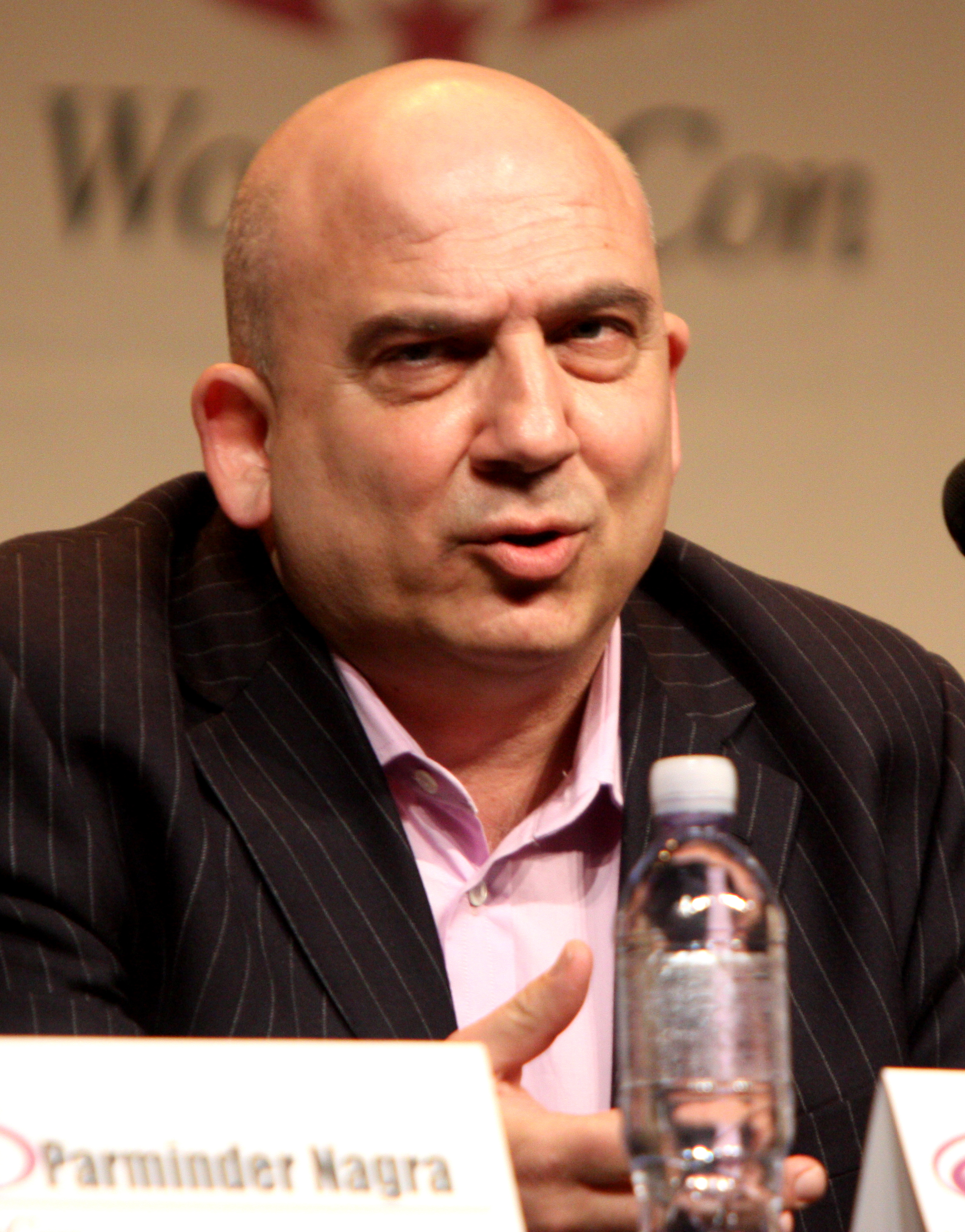
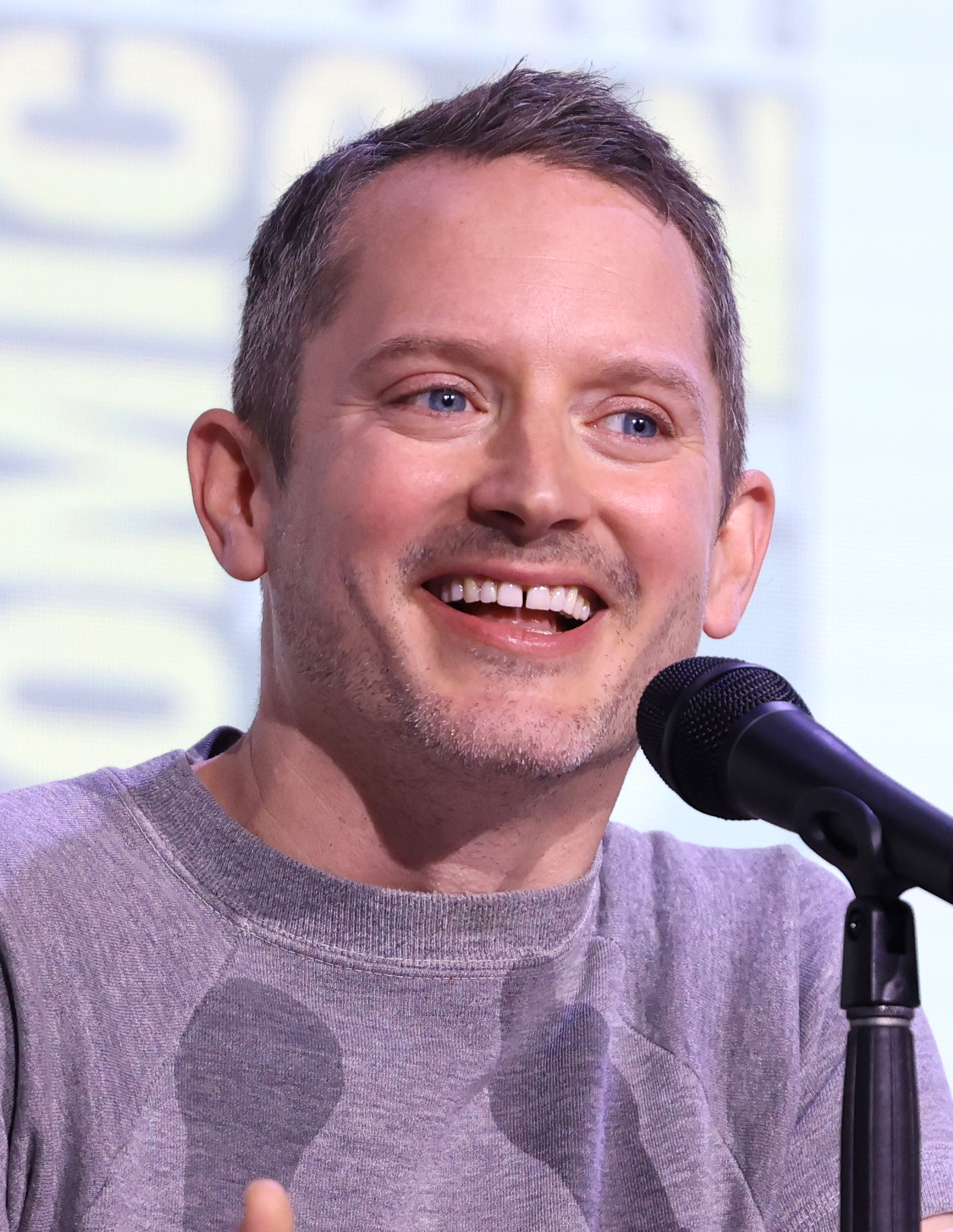
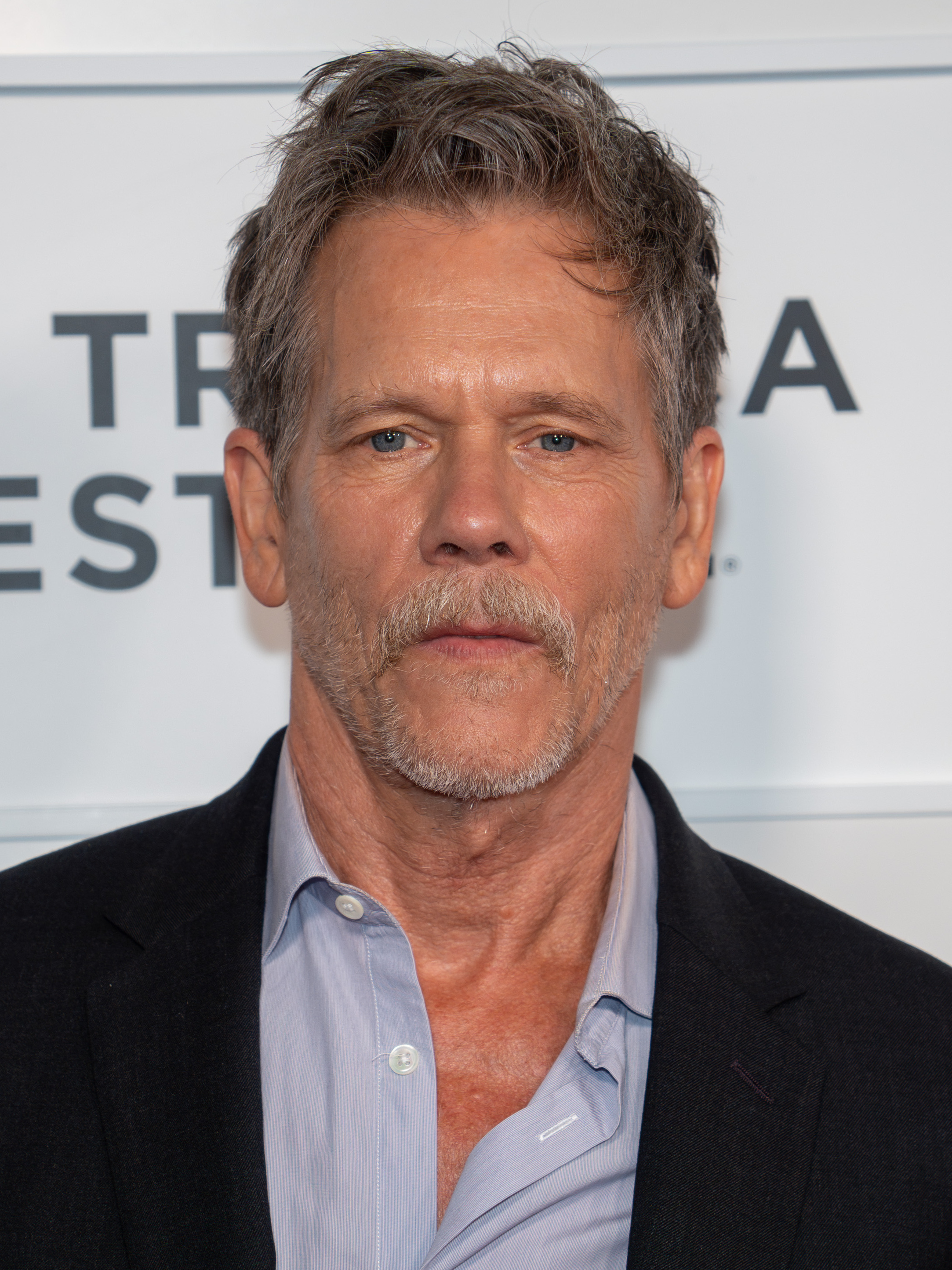
Left to right:
Peter Dinklage, Jacob Tremblay, Taylour Paige, Julia Davis, Jonny Coyne, Elijah Wood, and Kevin Bacon
- Peter Dinklage as Winston Gooze / the Toxic Avenger / Toxie (voice), a widowed man who worked as a janitor until he was mutated
  - Luisa Guerreiro as the Toxic Avenger (suit performer)
- Jacob Tremblay as Wade, Winston's stepson
- Taylour Paige as J.J. Doherty, a whistleblower
- Kevin Bacon as Bob Garbinger, a corrupt businessman
- Elijah Wood as Fritz Garbinger, Bob's younger brother and a manager of the Killer Nutz
- Sarah Niles as Mayor Togar, the corrupt mayor of St. Roma's Village
- Julia Davis as Kissy Sturnevan, Bob's assistant
- Julian Kostov as Budd Berserk, the leader of the Killer Nutz
- Jonny Coyne as Thad Barkabus, a powerful mobster
- David Yow as Guthrie Stockins, a homeless ally of Winston
- Shaun Dooley as Melvin Ferd, a muckraking reporter
- Annette Badland as Daisy, a local shop owner and Winston’s neighbor
- Rebecca O'Mara as Shelly Gooze, Winston's late wife and Wade's mother
- Jane Levy as Cheerful Insurance Representative (voice)
- Macon Blair as Dennis
- Lloyd Kaufman as Lloyd

== Production ==
In April 2010, a remake of The Toxic Avenger (1984) was announced. The remake, said to be aiming for a "family-friendly" PG-13 release similar to the animated Toxic Crusaders television series, was set to be co-written and directed by Steve Pink. In May 2013, Arnold Schwarzenegger was in talks for a role in the film. He eventually dropped out to work on Terminator Genisys (2015).

In September 2016, reports indicated that Conrad Vernon would direct the film, with Guillermo del Toro of Double Dare You, Bob Cooper and Alex Schwartz of Storyscape Entertainment, and Akiva Goldsman and Greg Lessans of Weed Road Pictures executive producing, while Mike Arnold and Chris Poole were attached to rewrite the screenplay by Pink and Daniel C. Mitchell. In December 2018, Legendary Pictures won the rights to reboot The Toxic Avenger, with the original's producers, Lloyd Kaufman and Michael Herz of Troma Entertainment, returning. In March 2019, Macon Blair was announced to write and direct. Of the script, Kaufman said, "Macon Blair knows Troma better than I do. He's seen everything. He's seen the cartoon [Toxic Crusaders], he's seen the Halloween special, he's seen everything. And he loves our movies... I've read the script and it's better than the original and I leave it to him. If I'm called upon, I'd be happy to jump in. I learned on the musical to leave the creative to the creative. I learned to let them ask so if they want me, I'm there... I hope that Legendary keeps going. If they let Macon Blair direct it, I think it will be terrific. He knows the Troma sense of humor, the combination of slapstick, and satire with the environmental theme."

In November 2020, Peter Dinklage came on board to star. Additional cast members were revealed from April to June 2021. Principal photography commenced on June 21, 2021, in Bulgaria and wrapped on August 14, 2021. In December 2021, Dinklage said the film was "not a remake". In January 2022, Blair confirmed the film will employ practical gore effects, and the time period setting will be a "little bit of both" in the past and present. Luisa Guerreiro wore the full-body suit and makeup of the Toxic Avenger with Dinklage dubbing the dialogue in post-production.

== Release ==
The Toxic Avenger premiered as the opening film of Fantastic Fest on September 21, 2023. The film also played at Beyond Fest on September 30, 2023, before having its international debut at the 56th Sitges Film Festival, as part of the Out of Competition section, on October 13, 2023. It had its UK premiere at the Midnight Madness strand of the 78th Edinburgh International Film Festival on August 19, 2025.

In January 2025, it was announced that Cineverse had acquired distribution rights, with plans to release it unrated (after initially earning an R rating) theatrically later that year; that same month, the company scheduled it for release in the United States on August 29, 2025. In March, Cineverse partnered with Iconic Events Releasing to bring the film to theaters. In July, members of the cast made appearances at San Diego Comic-Con and at Digital Gym Cinema to promote the film.

The marketing team for The Toxic Avenger and its distributor, Cineverse, partnered with the nonprofit Undue Medical Debt to buy out $5 million USD of medical debt instead of using the money for marketing. Additionally, for every $1 million the movie makes at the box office, Cineverse agreed to buy out another million in debt. Cineverse's SVP of Marketing, Lauren McCarthy, said, "We spent hours brainstorming how to close out the campaign and, while sending Toxie to the moon was appealing, no idea came close to combating unexpected medical debt for families. The Toxic Avenger had his entire life upended by crushing medical costs so, as Toxie says, 'Sometimes you have to do something'."

== Reception ==
On the review aggregator website Rotten Tomatoes, 86% of 146 critics' reviews are positive, with an average rating of 6.8/10. The website's consensus reads: "Like the original, The Toxic Avenger isn't for everyone – but viewers seeking an extremely gory, extremely silly good time won't be disappointed." Metacritic, which uses a weighted average, assigned the film a score of 65 out of 100, based on 21 critics, indicating "generally favorable" reviews.

== Graphic novel ==
A graphic novel based on the film was released on September 2, 2025, by Legendary Comics.
