= The Toxic Avenger (1984 film) =

1984 American superhero black comedy film by Michael Herz and Lloyd Kaufman

- Theatrical release poster
- Directed by: Michael Herz; Lloyd Kaufman (as Samuel Weil)
- Screenplay by: Joe Ritter
- Story by: Lloyd Kaufman
- Produced by: Lloyd Kaufman; Michael Herz
- Starring: Andree Maranda; Mitchell Cohen; Pat Ryan Jr.; Jennifer Babtist; Robert Prichard; Cindy Manion; Gary Schneider; Mark Torgl
- Cinematography: James London; Lloyd Kaufman
- Edited by: Richard W. Haines
- Production company: Troma Entertainment
- Distributed by: Troma Entertainment
- Release date: April 4, 1984
- Running time: 82 minutes
- Country: United States
- Language: English
- Budget: $500,000

The Toxic Avenger is a 1984 American independent superhero comedy film produced and directed by Michael Herz and Lloyd Kaufman (the latter credited as Samuel Weil for directing), and written by Joe Ritter. It stars Andree Maranda, Mitchell Cohen, R.L. Ryan (credited as Pat Ryan Jr.), Jennifer Babtist, Robert Prichard, Cindy Manion, Gary Schneider, and Mark Torgl.

The film follows Melvin Ferd, a scrawny and socially awkward janitor, who turns into a hideously deformed super-strong creature, after falling into a drum of toxic waste. Adopting the name "The Toxic Avenger" or "Toxie", he becomes a vigilante who begins to kill and punish the corrupt criminals, drug dealers, and thugs terrorizing Tromaville.

The Toxic Avenger was first released theatrically on April 4, 1984, by Troma Entertainment. The film was virtually ignored by film critics and audiences upon its release, but it later found success as a midnight movie at Bleecker Street Cinema in New York City in late 1985. It has since become a cult film, and spawned a franchise of the same name.

== Plot ==
Melvin Ferd is a scrawny, socially awkward janitor at a health club in the fictional town of Tromaville, New Jersey. He's regularly harassed and bullied by customers Bozo, Slug, Wanda and Julie, who also regularly engage in random, senseless acts of vehicular homicide around town, including deliberately running over the head of a preteen cyclist.

One day, as a cruel prank, the group trick Melvin into wearing a pink tutu and kissing a sheep in anticipation of having sex with Julie. He is ridiculed by a gathered crowd and chased around the health club and out of a second-story window. He falls into a drum of toxic waste on a truck parked outside, which transforms him into a hulking, hideously deformed mutant with superhuman size and strength.

That night, a group of drug dealers, led by the gangster Cigar Face, are trying to bribe a police officer. When he refuses to accept the money, Cigar Face and his gang prepare to castrate him. Melvin appears and brutally kills most of the criminals, leaving a mop on their faces as a calling card. Cigar Face escapes, promising to take revenge. When Melvin returns home, his mother is terrified of him and will not let him in the house, so he builds a makeshift home in the local junkyard.

Sometime later, a gang of three men hold up a Mexican restaurant and attack a blind woman named Sara. They kill her guide dog and attempt to rape her, but are stopped by Melvin. Melvin takes Sara back to her home, where they get to know one another and become romantically involved.

Melvin continues to vanquish local criminals such as drug dealers and pimps for underage prostitutes, becoming known as "the monster hero". At a press conference, a scientist explains that as a result of his mutation, Melvin has developed an innate sense of who is "evil" and is compelled to attack them brutally when he encounters them. Tromaville's mayor Peter Belgoody, secretly the leader of Tromaville's extensive crime ring, fears having the truth of his corruption exposed and wants Melvin gone. A group of men, led by Cigar Face, surround Melvin with guns in an alley. Just before they fire on him, he leaps up to a fire escape so they shoot each other instead.

Melvin takes revenge on the four bullies who caused his transformation. He first attacks Wanda in the health club's sauna and burns her backside on the heater. He returns to the club later, pursues Julie into the basement, and attacks her with a pair of scissors (though the aftermath is not shown onscreen). Melvin then confronts Bozo and Slug after they steal a car. They attempt to run Melvin down, but he leaps onto the roof and throws Slug out of the moving car. Melvin then gets in and pulls off the steering wheel, causing Bozo to drive off the side of a cliff. The car explodes, killing Bozo.

When Melvin kills a seemingly innocent old woman in a dry cleaning store (in fact a leader of a human trafficking ring), Belgoody calls in the United States National Guard. Melvin, seemingly unaware that he only attacks evil people, is horrified at what he has become. He and Sara move away from the city and into a tent in the nearby woods.

They are eventually discovered, and Mayor Belgoody and the National Guard come to kill him, with Belgoody reasoning that Melvin is a monster, not a person. However, the people of Tromaville step in, and Melvin's mother identifies the mutant as her son. The Mayor's evil ways are revealed, and Melvin disembowels and kills him in front of the crowd. Hailed as a hero, Melvin continues to combat crime in Tromaville, and the film's narrator announces he is now known as The Toxic Avenger.

== Cast ==
- Mitch Cohen as Melvin Ferd, a.k.a. The Toxic Avenger (referred to in dialogue as "the monster hero"), a janitor who is turned into a deformed superhero from toxic waste
  - Mark Torgl as Melvin pre-mutation
  - Kenneth Kessler as the voice of The Toxic Avenger
- Andree Maranda as Sara, a blind girl who becomes Melvin's girlfriend
- Pat Ryan Jr. as Peter Belgoody, the Mayor of Tromaville who is secretly the head of a crime ring that is plaguing it
- Sarabel Levinson as Mrs. Ferd, Melvin's mother
- Dan Snow as Cigar Face, a drug dealer usually seen with a cigar in his mouth
- Dick Martinsen as Officer O'Clancy, a police officer whom Melvin saves from Cigar Face
- Gary Schneider as Bozo, a health club patron who picks on Melvin and commits random acts of vehicular homicide
- Robert Prichard as Slug, a friend of Bozo and fellow bully
- Jennifer Babtist as Wanda, Slug's girlfriend
- Cindy Manion as Julie, the girlfriend of Bozo who lets him use her car for his hit-and-run murders
- Chris Liano as Walter Harris
- David Weiss as the Chief of Police who is loyal to Belgoody and often does a Nazi salute to him
- Doug Isbecque as "Knuckles", a minion of Cigar Face who is killed by Toxie
- Charles Lee Jr. as "Nipples", a cross-dressing minion of Cigar Face who is killed by Toxie
- Pat Kilpatrick as Leroy, a gun-toting criminal who raids a Mexican restaurant
- Larry Sulton as Frank, the knife-wielding leader of the criminal trio who raids a Mexican restaurant and has his arm ripped off by Melvin
- Michael Russo as Rico, a knife-wielding criminal and karate expert who raids a Mexican restaurant
- Al Pia as Tom Wrightson
- Dennis Souder as the drug dealer that Melvin kills at the health club
- Steven Zmed as Gaseous Maximus, the Human Trash Can
- Xavier Barquet as a man who is shot in a Mexican restaurant by Leroy
- Reuben Guss as Dr. Snodburger
- Matt Klan as Boy Hero
- Dominick Calvitto as "Skippy", a boy on a bicycle who becomes one of Bozo's victims
- Britt Martinsen, Kristen Martinsen, and Lisa Martinsen as The Hero Fan Club Members

== Production ==
The Toxic Avenger was the film that established Troma's formula and following. Previously the production company focused on sex comedies such as Cry Uncle! and Squeeze Play!. Subsequently, Troma focused almost exclusively on horror films.

In 1975, Lloyd Kaufman had the idea to shoot a horror film involving a health club while serving as the pre-production supervisor on the set of Rocky. Years later at the Cannes Film Festival, Kaufman read an article that stated monster movies were no longer popular, so he decided to produce his own take on one based on his idea. It was given the original working title of Health Club Horror, and eventually retitled.

=== Filming ===
Principal photography for The Toxic Avenger took place at various locations in New Jersey, with most of it shot in and around Boonton. The car chase scene, which ends with a car driving off a cliff and exploding, was filmed in Jersey City. The scene was inspired by the final truck scene in George Miller's film Mad Max 2. Filming was completed in 1983.

== Release ==
=== Theatrical ===
Troma Entertainment released The Toxic Avenger initially in 1984, receiving an early review from Variety in late December. During the next year, the film had a long run as the midnight movie on the single screen of the Bleecker Street Cinema in New York City. On April 4, 1986, the film opened on 45 screens and earned $140,000 for its opening weekend.

=== Home media ===
The Toxic Avenger was released by Troma on VHS and Betamax in 1986, and for the first time on DVD on March 25, 1998. It was re-released by Troma on November 20, 2000 and again on September 3, 2002, as part of a 4-disk Toxic Avenger movie pack. The film was picked up for distribution by Prism, who released the film on DVD on February 2, 2004. Troma then released its own 21st Anniversary Edition version of the film on March 29, 2005. On March 7, 2006, the film was released again on DVD by Koch Entertainment. The film would not receive another home media release until Troma released a "Japanese Cut" of the film on December 11, 2012. Troma released the film for the first time on Blu-ray on August 12, 2014. On November 18 that year, it was again released on Blu-ray by Import Vendor.

== Reception ==
=== Critical response ===
On review aggregator Rotten Tomatoes, The Toxic Avenger holds an approval rating of 73%, based on 22 reviews. Its consensus reads, "A silly and ribald superhero spoof, Toxic Avenger's uninhibited humor hits more than it misses." On Metacritic, the film has a weighted average score of 42 out of 100, based on 8 critics, indicating "mixed or average reviews".

Author and film critic Leonard Maltin awarded the film 2.5 out of 4 stars, calling the film "a funny spoof... Not without violence and gore but still entertaining." Stephen Holden of The New York Times rated the film a score of 3/5, complimenting the film for its "maniacally farcical sense of humor", while also noting that the film itself was "trash."

TV Guide gave the film a negative 1/5 stars, writing "Though it is silly, sleazy, and graphically violent, The Toxic Avenger does hold a bit of warped charm for fans of this sort of thing." Keith Phipps from The A.V. Club was highly critical of the film, writing, "As for the movie itself, it's still a piece of trash, if a marginally entertaining one: it's too self-consciously parodic to be good kitsch, and too gross to be all that fun." In his book Comedy-Horror Films: A Chronological History, 1914–2008, Bruce G. Hallenbeck described the film as "disgusting, sick, vile, poorly acted and sloppily produced." He challenged the interpretation of the film as a parody, arguing that the mean-spirited tone of its extreme gore and offensiveness makes clear that the filmmakers were simply trying to appeal to the lowest common denominator.

== Reboot ==
In 2010 a remake of The Toxic Avenger was announced, set to be co-written and directed by Steve Pink. In 2016 Variety reported that Conrad Vernon would direct the film, while Mike Arnold and Chris Poole were attached to rewrite the screenplay by Pink and Daniel C. Mitchell. In 2018 Legendary Pictures won the rights to reboot The Toxic Avenger, with the original's directors–producers, Kaufman and Herz, returning as producers. In 2019 Macon Blair was announced to write and direct the upcoming film.

In November 2020 it was announced that Peter Dinklage would star in the film. In April 2021 Jacob Tremblay and Taylour Paige were added to the cast. In June 2021, Kevin Bacon, Julia Davis, and Elijah Wood joined the cast. That month principal photography commenced in Bulgaria and wrapped on August.

The Toxic Avenger remake premiered as the opening film of Fantastic Fest on September 21, 2023, and was theatrically released by Cineverse in the United States in 2025.

== See also ==
- List of cult films
