= The Dark Side of Midnight =

- VHS cover
- Directed by: Wes Olen
- Written by: Wes Olen
- Produced by: Maryann Olsen; Wes Olsen
- Starring: James F. Moore; Wes Olsen; Sandy Schemmel; Dave Bowling; Dan Myers
- Cinematography: Wes Page
- Edited by: Wes Olsen
- Music by: Doug Holroyd
- Distributed by: Troma Entertainment
- Release date: 1984
- Running time: 89 minutes
- Country: United States
- Language: English
- Budget: $10,000

The Dark Side of Midnight (also known as The Creeper) is a 1984 thriller written and directed by Wes Olsen.

== Summary ==
The plot follows a detective on the trail of a serial killer known as 'The Creeper', whose relentless string of murders are terrorizing the residents of a small town.

== Home media ==
The film was released on VHS by Prism Home Entertainment in 1986 and on DVD by Troma Entertainment as part of Toxie's Triple Terror, Vol. 5 on Jan. 11 2005.

== See also ==
- Slasher film
- List of American independent films
