= Girls School Screamers =

- Theatrical release poster
- Directed by: John P. Finnegan
- Written by: John P. Finnegan; Katie Keating; Pierce J. Keating
- Produced by: James W. Finnegan Jr. John P. Finnegan; Pierce J. Keating
- Starring: Mollie O'Mara; Sharon Christopher; Mari Butler; Beth O'Malley; Karen Krevitz
- Cinematography: Albert R. Jordan
- Edited by: Thomas R. Rondinella
- Music by: John Hodian
- Distributed by: Troma Entertainment
- Release dates: May 23, 1986 (New York City); November 14, 1986 (Philadelphia)
- Running time: 85 minutes
- Country: United States
- Language: English
- Budget: $87,000

Girls School Screamers is a 1986 American supernatural slasher film co-written and directed by John P. Finnegan. The plot follows a group of young college girls who are taken up to an abandoned mansion to help renovate it, only to later be dispatched one by one by an unseen assailant. The film was shot independently in Philadelphia under the title The Portrait, before it was acquired by Troma Entertainment, who reshot portions of it and retitled the film.

== Plot ==
A group of seven senior students (Jackie, Elizabeth, Kate, Karen, Susan, Adelle, and Rosemary) at the all-girls Catholic Trinity College are sent to spend four days cataloging a large art collection in the now-empty Welles mansion, the contents of which have been bestowed to the college. The mansion has had a longstanding reputation for being haunted by a vengeful female ghost.

The elderly Sister Urban oversees the project, and is surprised upon arrival to be met by Dr. Robert Fisher, who presents himself as a prospective buyer of the home. On the first day in the house, Jackie finds a diary dating back to the 1930s of Jennifer Welles, a Trinity College alumnus and the niece of Tyler Welles, the home's original owner. In the diary, Jennifer makes reference to Sister Urban, and writes of her longing to become a nun herself. When Jackie brings up the name to Sister Urban during dinner, she recounts to the young women how the orphaned Jennifer was killed at the mansion in an accident.

That night, all of the girls, aside from Jackie and Adelle, propose that they hold a seance in an attempt to contact Jennifer's spirit, which ends in apparent poltergeist activity. After everyone else has gone to sleep, Jackie and Elizabeth find a large portrait of Jennifer in the parlor, which bears a striking resemblance to Jackie. Unable to sleep, Jackie continues reading Jennifer's diary, and learns that, while staying in the mansion, Jennifer was subject to sexual advances from her uncle Tyler, and that the two eventually engaged in an incestuous relationship.

The next day, an unnerved Jackie and Elizabeth attempt to conceal the portrait from the others while cataloging items in the house. Sister Urban begins feeling ill, and spends the remainder of the night bedridden. Meanwhile, Rosemary is murdered with a meat cleaver by an unseen assailant while riding in a dumbwaiter. The others assume Rosemary is playing a prank when she fails to meet them for dinner. Karen goes searching for her in the basement, and finds her body stuffed in the dumbwaiter before she too is killed. Kate is subsequently murdered outside when she is dragged into a pond by a rotting, decomposed hand.

Shortly after, Jackie's boyfriend, Paul, and his friend, Bruce, arrive at the mansion, startling Susan. While Paul locates Jackie, Bruce is run over and killed by Paul's car outside. Meanwhile, Sister Urban becomes progressively ill, and Elizabeth and Susan, who have been standing vigil at her bedside, grow worried. Susan is lured into the attic, where she is locked inside and electrocuted to death, causing her body to become incinerated. Jackie and Paul begin searching for Adelle and Bruce. While searching outside, Paul is stabbed to death with a pitchfork by the killer, posed as a sculpture donning a babydoll mask.

Jackie, unable to locate anyone, stumbles upon Sister Urban in the hallway, and finds her in a confused, feverish state. After putting Sister Urban back to bed, Jackie goes into the basement, where she finds all of her classmates' corpses (save Elizabeth, who has been kidnapped and is still alive) seated in chairs before a ceremonial altar. She is met by Dr. Robert Fisher, who is in fact Tyler Welles, seeking to marry Jackie as he believes her to be a reincarnation of his dead niece. Meanwhile, Sister Urban manages to summon Jennifer's spirit, which possesses Jackie, allowing her to enact revenge on her Satanic uncle Tyler, killing him by gouging out his eyeballs, avenging her murder by him decades prior. Jackie, Elizabeth, and Sister Urban manage to flee the house in an ambulance. As they drive away, an apparition of Jennifer looks down from an upstairs window.

== Cast ==
- Mollie O'Mara as Jackie / Jennifer Welles
- Sharon Christopher as Elizabeth
- Mari Butler as Kate
- Beth O'Malley as Karen
- Karen Krevitz as Susan
- Marcia Hinton as Adelle
- Monica Antonucci as Rosemary
- Peter Cosimano as Paul
- Vera Gallagher as Sister Mary Urban
- Charles Braun as Tyler Welles
- Tony Manzo as Dr. Robert Fisher
- John Turner as Bruce

== Production ==
Girls School Screamers was the debut feature directorial effort of Philadelphia based John P. Finnegan after previously producing television commercials and industrial films for Center City Video. Finnegan independently raised the film's $87,000 budget from family and friends and convinced a crew made up of recent NYU Film School graduates to work for deferred payment. Most of the film was shot in a mansion in Chestnut Hill, Philadelphia over a twenty-six day shoot under its original title of The Portrait.

== Release ==
Four days after sending copies of the film to prospective distributors, Lloyd Kaufman of Troma Entertainment contacted Finnegan to acquire worldwide rights to the film and changed the title from The Portrait to Girls School Screamers. The film opened theatrically in New York City on May 23, 1986 and in Philadelphia on November 14, 1986.

=== Critical response ===
Fred Beldin of AllMovie awarded the film one out of five stars, writing: "Subpar even for the Troma Team, Girls School Screamers is a hybrid slasher/ghost story that half-heartedly collects horror clichés and regurgitates them with routine indifference. The gore sequences are minimal and poorly rendered, the female cast keeps their tops on, and even the hope for amusement via amateurish performances and absurd dialogue is dashed by an overall lack of energy."
