= Waitress! =

1981 film by Michael Herz, Lloyd Kaufman

- Directed by: Lloyd Kaufman; Michael Herz
- Written by: Charles Kaufman; Michael Stone
- Produced by: Lloyd Kaufman; Michael Herz; Tony Gittleson; Ira Kanarick; Lloyd Kaufman
- Starring: Jim Harris; Carol Drake; Carol Bevar; Renata Majer; Hunt Block
- Cinematography: Lloyd Kaufman
- Edited by: Dan Lowenthal
- Distributed by: Troma Entertainment
- Release date: 1981
- Running time: 90 minutes
- Country: United States
- Language: English
- Budget: $400,000
- Box office: $5.15 million

Waitress! is a 1981 American comedy film directed by Lloyd Kaufman and Michael Herz of Troma Entertainment. It was the second in Troma's line of "sexy comedies", preceded by the 1979's Squeeze Play! and followed by 1982's Stuck on You! and 1983's The First Turn-On!

== Premise ==
The film follows an aspiring actress working as a waitress, as she deals with a variety of crazy customers, drunken chefs, and other zany hurdles.
