= Stuck on You! =

1982 film by Michael Herz, Lloyd Kaufman

- DVD cover
- Directed by: Michael Herz; Lloyd Kaufman
- Written by: Jeffrey Delman; Tony Gittleson; Michael Herz; Lloyd Kaufman; Darren Kloomok; Warren Leight; Duffy Caesar Magesis; Melanie Mintz; Don Perman; Stuart Strutin
- Produced by: Michael Herz; Lloyd Kaufman; Stuart Strutin
- Starring: Irwin Corey; Virginia Penta; Mark Mikulski; Albert Pia; Norma Pratt
- Cinematography: Lloyd Kaufman
- Edited by: Richard W. Haines; Darren Kloomok; Ralph Rosenblum
- Distributed by: Troma Entertainment
- Release date: 1982
- Running time: 90 minutes
- Country: United States
- Language: English
- Box office: $10 million (US) $1,105,000

Stuck on You! is a 1982 American comedy film directed by Lloyd Kaufman and Michael Herz of Troma Entertainment and starring Irwin Corey, Virginia Penta, Mark Mikulski, Albert Pia, and Norma Pratt.

Stuck on You! was the third in a series of four "sexy comedies" that helped establish Troma, beginning with 1979's Squeeze Play!, 1981's Waitress!, and followed by 1983's The First Turn-On! Troma claimed that the film had grossed $9.6 million in the United States in its first 90 days of release.

Lloyd Kaufman has stated that Stuck on You! is his favorite of Troma Entertainment's "sexy comedies".

== Plot ==
The film, supposedly inspired by the writings of Tom Lehrer and Stan Freberg, follows estranged couple Bill and Carol, who are in a palimony suit against each other. The zany Judge Gabriel (played by Professor Irwin Corey) is handling their suit. As Bill and Carol relate their problems to Gabriel, he demonstrates how all lovers from the beginning of time, including Adam and Eve, Queen Isabella, Christopher Columbus, and King Arthur and Lady Guinevere have all faced their exact same troubles. The judge is finally revealed to be the angel Gabriel, sent down in hopes of bringing the couple back together.

== Critical reception ==
NYT critic Janet Maslin reported that the film's "Dumb gags, food fights and bathroom jokes are accompanied, if not redeemed, by an overriding cheerfulness and a willingness to try just about anything," noted that the "humor never rises above the level of idiocy, but at least it's good-natured," and that "most of the acting is unabashedly amateurish." A review of the film on DVD Talk described it as having "a Mel Brooksian screwball style," but noted that "Some of the[] vignettes are clever, but the back-and-forth structure gets tiring, making 88 minutes feel like two hours."

== See also ==
- List of films about angels
