= Class of Nuke 'Em High =

1986 American film

- Theatrical release poster
- Directed by: Richard W. Haines; Lloyd Kaufman
- Written by: Lloyd Kaufman; Richard W. Haines; Mark Rudnitsky; Stuart Strutin
- Produced by: Michael Herz; Lloyd Kaufman; James Treadwell
- Starring: Janelle Brady; Gil Brenton; Robert Prichard; Pat Ryan
- Cinematography: Michael Mayers
- Edited by: Richard W. Haines
- Production company: Troma Entertainment
- Distributed by: Troma Entertainment
- Release date: December 12, 1986
- Running time: 83 minutes
- Country: United States
- Language: English
- Budget: $400,000

Class of Nuke 'Em High (also known as Atomic High School) is a 1986 American science-fiction horror comedy film produced and distributed by Troma Entertainment. Directed by Richard W. Haines and Lloyd Kaufman (the latter under the pseudonym "Samuel Weil"), the film follows a high school impacted by radioactive drugs obtained from a nearby nuclear power plant. New York holographer Jason Sapan created the laser effects.

== Plot ==
Tromaville High School in New Jersey is located next to a nuclear power plant. A nuclear accident at the power plant is covered up by plant owner, Mr. Paley, who does not want the facility shut down by the safety commission. The accident causes a radioactive water leak which ends up gruesomely killing a student named Dewey at the school after the tainted water reaches the drinking fountain. The gang of the school, called "The Cretins," who were originally part of the honor society, torments the school, and it is implied that they have been turned into violent psychopaths by the runoff from the plant. They pick leaves from a radioactive marijuana plant located in the yard of the nuclear plant and sell it to Eddie for $10.

At his "indoor bikini beach party" that night, Eddie pressures his friend Warren and Warren's girlfriend Chrissy into smoking the radioactive joint, but it accidentally falls on the floor and is trampled by other party-goers before anyone else can try it. The mutated drug shows itself to have potent aphrodisiac effects, leading to Warren and Chrissy having sex in Eddie's loft. However, that same night, both of them have disturbing nightmares about hideously mutating, with Warren's penis and Chrissy's stomach growing, though these effects are seemingly gone by morning.

Some time later, Chrissy discovers that she is pregnant, and spits out a small creature into a nearby toilet. The creature travels through the water pipes and lands in a barrel filled with radioactive waste. There it mutates into a bigger creature. The nuclear Plant orders a lock down of the school, and begins an investigation into Dewey's death. One of the nuclear workers begins to investigate the basement. Though his equipment shows signs of a spill, he can't find any evidence, outside of a foul odor. After hearing for a second time a sound which he had previously dismissed, he investigates. As he is observing a barrel, the monster's arm reaches out and claws his face before killing him.

Meanwhile, Warren, tired of the Cretins' constant harassment, ends up going on a radiation-fueled rampage, killing two of them, with no memory of the event once he comes to his senses. The Cretins, expelled from the school and cut off from their customer base, assault the principal and force him to use the school's Radiation Alarm to cause an evacuation, letting the Cretins bar the building and occupy it. In the process of doing this, the Cretins shoot and kill the principal's secretary, who happened to open the door just as the gang was torturing the principal. Capturing Chrissy as bait for Warren, the leader of the gang holds her hostage in the basement and plans to kill her in front of Warren, only to be interrupted by the now adult monster.

Warren goes into the school to save her and discovers the adult monster, who kills every one of the Cretins. Warren zaps the creature with a laser from the physics laboratory as he and Chrissy flee the school. Mr. Paley enters the room before the school explodes, killing him and the creature. The students celebrate as the loudspeakers announce that the school will be shut down for remodeling. While reconstruction is taking place, another small creature appears squirming through the remains of the destroyed school.

== Cast ==
- Janelle Brady as Chrissy
- Gil Brenton as Warren
- Robert Prichard as Spike
- James Nugent Vernon as Eddie
- Pat Ryan Jr. as Mr. Paley
- Brad Dunker as Gonzo
- Gary Schneider as Pete
- Theo Cohan as Muffey
- Rick Howard as Spud
- Gary Rosenblatt as Greg
- Mary Taylor as Judy
- Lauren Heather McMahon as Taru

== Music ==
Class of Nuke 'Em High (The Original Motion Picture Soundtrack)

Soundtrack album by Various Artists
- Released: December 30, 2014
- Genre: Soundtrack
- Label: Ship to Shore PhonoCo.

The soundtrack to the film remained unreleased until 2014, when Troma licensed its release on the Ship to Shore PhonoCo. label. The album was released in physical form exclusively on LP record as a limited pressing of 1,300 copies, with 700 being black, 300 of a green-colored version known as "Atomic High", and another 300 of a green/blue color known as "Dewey's Meltdown". Each copy included a card with a code that allowed for download of an expanded digital release that contained commentary on each song from Troma President and Class of Nuke 'Em High co-director Lloyd Kaufman.

All songs from the soundtrack were featured in the film except two tracks. "We Are One" by Ethan & the Coup who had previously written the song for the movie in 1986, but missed the deadline for submission for the film to be included. The theme to Class of Nuke 'Em High 2: Subhumanoid Meltdown was only heard on the film's sequel.

Original Motion Picture Soundtrack

1. "Troma Leader" – 0:15
2. "Nuke 'Em High" by Ethan & the Coup – 4:23
3. "Emotional Refugee" by David Behennah – 3:21
4. "Angel" by GMT – 3:41
5. "Rock 'n' Roll Paradise" by Stormbringer – 7:09
6. "Much Too Much" by The Smithereens – 2:22
7. "Run for Your Life" by Stratus – 4:27
8. "Class of Nuke 'Em High Part 2" – 3:20

== Reception ==
Class of Nuke 'Em High has received generally negative reviews. On review aggregator website Rotten Tomatoes, the film received an approval rating of 20% based on 5 reviews, with an average rating of 4.2/10. DVD Talk offers a more positive assessment of the film: "Class Of Nuke 'Em High isn't a film to be taken too seriously, but rather enjoyed for what it is and that's a crass, gory, trashy fun-filled eighty five minutes of Troma style high jinks. It plays off of different clichés and stereotypes really well and provides plenty of low-brow laughs and splattery set pieces." A review for Horror DNA praises various aspects of the film, including special effects and cinematography: "The film is a testament to filmmakers with high ambitions and low budgets, as the production value is at times quite impressive. The miniatures used for the nuclear plant are effective and the visual f/x do not stick out as shoddy or overtly fake. There are some nice action sequences involving motorcycles and even some gun play that are tightly edited and help the film to zip along. Michael Mayers’ cinematography adds a layer of beauty to sequences that otherwise risk appearing cheap and jokey."

The film earned $1,900,000 at the US box office.

== Sequels ==
The film spawned four sequels. Two came in the 1990s with 1991's Class of Nuke 'Em High 2: Subhumanoid Meltdown and 1994's Class of Nuke 'Em High 3: The Good, the Bad and the Subhumanoid. These two sequels were not directed by either Lloyd Kaufman or Michael Herz, but were produced by them. They were more comedic than violent and had good production values despite the low budget. The sequels marked the first appearance by Tromie the radioactive squirrel. Two sequels directed by Kaufman arrived in the 2010s. A fourth installment of the series called Return to Nuke 'Em High Volume 1 was released in January 2014. The fifth entry, Return to Return to Nuke 'Em High AKA Volume 2, premiered at 2017 Cannes Film Festival.

== Potential remake ==
In 2011, it was announced that Troma was in negotiations to sell the remake rights to Class of Nuke 'Em High.
