= Cry Uncle! =

1971 film by John G. Avildsen

- Theatrical release poster
- Directed by: John G. Avildsen
- Written by: David Odell
- Based on: Live a Little, Die a Little by Michael Brett
- Produced by: David Jay Disick
- Starring: Allen Garfield; Madeleine Le Roux; Devin Goldenberg
- Cinematography: John G. Avildsen
- Edited by: John G. Avildsen
- Music by: Harper MacKay
- Distributed by: Troma Entertainment
- Release date: August 17, 1971
- Running time: 87 min.
- Country: United States
- Language: English
- Budget: $250,000
- Box office: $1,083,000

Cry Uncle!, released in the UK as Super Dick (theatrical title) and American Oddballs (video title), is a 1971 American film in the Troma Entertainment library. It is directed by John G. Avildsen and stars Allen Garfield. The story, based on the Michael Brett novel Lie a Little, Die a Little, follows the misadventures of a slobbish private detective who is hired by a millionaire to investigate a murder. The film features one of Paul Sorvino's first screen performances, and an early appearance from TV star Debbi Morgan.

== Plot ==
Private detective Jake Masters is with his girlfriend Renee when he gets a call about a new case. The New York City Police Department is hunting for an eccentric millionaire, Jason Dominic, in connection with the murder of a cocktail waitress named Lucille Reynolds. Jason wants Jake to find the real killer. Jake goes to LaGuardia Airport to pick up Jason's bodyguard, Cora Merrill. After an initial case of mistaken identity, Jake, his trainee nephew Keith, and Cora meet up and visit Jason's yacht. Jason tells them the police believe he killed Lucille because she had filmed an orgy featuring him with three prostitutes, who then blackmailed him out of $50,000.

Jake, Keith, and Cora go back to Jake's apartment. Cora rebuffs Jake's advances and instead has sex with Keith. The three start working through their list of prostitutes and other unsavory suspects one by one. While questioning a man, Cora becomes violent, leading Jake to exclude her from questioning others afterward. During one encounter, two prostitutes and a male suspect tie up Jake, but the male suspect goes outside and is killed by an unknown person. Jake then follows one of the prostitutes to an apartment and rapes her before realizing that she is dead.

By chance, Jake finds out that Cora's story does not make sense. He realizes that she is actually working on the orders of Jason to kill the blackmailers after Jake has located them. Jake notifies the police of this. He then goes back to his apartment and has sex with Cora. Afterward, he confronts her, and she admits to killing all of the suspects. A struggle ensues, and Cora is killed by the police. Renee then surprises Jake at his apartment, and the two are happy to be reunited.

== Cast ==
- Allen Garfield – Jake Masters
- Madeleine Le Roux – Cora Merrill
- Devin Goldenberg – Keith
- David Kirk – Jason Dominic
- Pamela Gruen – Renee
- Sean Walsh – Gene Sprigg
- Debbi Morgan – Olga Winter
- Maureen Byrnes – Lena Right
- Nancy Salmon – Connie Landfield
- Bruce Pecheur – Larry Caulk
- Paul Sorvino – Coughing Cop
- Ray Barron – Bald Cop
- Mel Stewart – Fowler
- Jackson Beck – Narrator

Lloyd Kaufman, co-founder of Troma, has a cameo appearance as a hippie. When the original distributor, Cambist Film, went out of business, Kaufman acquired the rights and it is now part of the Troma library.

== Reception ==
The film features a great deal of nudity, sex, and drug use. The film was banned in Finland for the year following its release, and in Norway until 2003. In addition to becoming a cult classic, the film launched a string of Troma films that appeared in the 1970s, 1980s, and 1990s, many of them becoming cult films that ran on cable TV.

During an interview featured in the Special Edition of the film's DVD, Allen Garfield says that Cry Uncle! is Oliver Stone's favorite comedy.

== See also ==
- List of American films of 1971
- List of Troma films
