= Screamplay =

- DVD cover
- Directed by: Rufus Butler Seder
- Written by: Ed Greenberg; Rufus Butler Seder
- Produced by: Dennis M. Piana
- Starring: George Kuchar; Katy Bolger; Rufus Butler Seder; Basil J. Bova; Ed Callahan
- Edited by: Rufus Butler Seder
- Music by: Basil J. Bova; George Cordeiro
- Distributed by: Troma Entertainment
- Release date: 1984
- Running time: 91 minutes
- Country: United States
- Language: English
- Budget: $50,000

Screamplay is a 1984 American horror film directed by Rufus Butler Seder.

== Plot ==
Aspiring screenwriter, Edgar Allen (Rufus B. Seder), arrives in Hollywood carrying his most valuable possessions: a battered suitcase and a typewriter. Edgar Allen's best attribute is his wild imagination. He imagines scenes so vividly for the murder mystery he is writing that they seem to come to life...and they do! As mysterious, gruesome murders pile up, Edgar Allen must confront aging actresses, rock stars, and the police in a bleak setting of broken dreams and hideously mangled bodies in Hollywood. As the line between reality and imagination becomes more blurred, Edgar Allen, convinced the only way to be a real writer is to suffer, is driven slowly mad.

== Cast ==
- Rufus Butler Seder as Edgar Allan
- George Kuchar as Martin
- Katy Bolger as Holly
- Basil J. Bova as Tony Cassano
- Ed Callahan as Keven Kleindorf
- George Cordeiro as Sgt. Joe Blatz
- M. Lynda Robinson (credited as "Linda Robinson") as Nina Ray
- Eugene Seder as Al Weiner
- Bob White as Lot
- James M. Connor as Nicky Blair

== Production ==
Screamplay was filmed between August and September 1983 in and around Boston, Massachusetts.

== Release ==
After a theatrical and video release, Troma released the film on DVD in 2005. This release is currently out of print.

== 2026 4K Restoration ==
Over the 40+ years that followed production, the film developed a cult following and in 2025 it was licensed to Muscle Distribution (NYC) and Matchbox Cine (Scotland) to be restored in 4K. As of this writing, the restoration is almost complete and video interviews with surviving cast and crew have been completed for inclusion on the restoration DVD along with other related materials including video and photos by underground film legend George Kuchar who co-starred in the film. Both the restoration and DVD are scheduled for release in 2026. The digital restoration was shown from September 25 to October 1, 2026 at the Anthology Film Archives in New York City. See External Links for a link to the Film Notes for this showing. On September 23, 2026, The New York Times reviewed the film in advance of the Anthology Film Archives series.

== Legacy ==
The director of the film, Rufus Butler Seder, would later be most famous for his Scanimation children’s books sold around the world in 16 languages, his LIFETILES animated murals and his optically animated toy inventions.
