= The First Turn-On! =

1983 film by Michael Herz, Lloyd Kaufman

- Theatrical poster for 'The First Turn-On!'
- Directed by: Lloyd Kaufman; Michael Herz
- Written by: Georgia Harrell; Michael Herz; Lloyd Kaufman; Stuart Strutin; Mark Torgl
- Produced by: Michael Herz; Lloyd Kaufman; William Kirksey; Stuart Strutin; Spencer A. Tandy
- Starring: Georgia Harrell; Michael Sanville; Googy Gress; John Flood; Heidi Miller; Sheila Kennedy; Vincent D'Onofrio; Rondell Sheridan; Ted Henning
- Cinematography: Lloyd Kaufman
- Edited by: Adam Fredericks; Richard King
- Distributed by: Troma Entertainment
- Release date: May 10, 1983
- Running time: 90 minutes
- Country: United States
- Language: English

The First Turn-On! is a 1983 American comedy film directed by Lloyd Kaufman and Michael Herz of Troma Entertainment. It was the last in a series of four "sexy comedies" that helped establish Troma as a film studio, starting with 1979's Squeeze Play!, 1981's Waitress! and 1982's Stuck on You!. The First Turn-On! was Vincent D'Onofrio's film debut.

== Plot ==
On the last day of summer at Camp Big-Tee-Pee, all the teenage campers are hormonal and eager to go home. While on a nature walk with ditzy hippie camp counselor Michelle Farmer, four students - self-proclaimed stud Mitch, his girlfriend Annie, Henry, and Danny - break off from the rest of the group to indulge in some cannabis. They take refuge in a nearby cave, only to be caught in the act by Michelle some time later. While being shooed out, Henry's flatulence causes a landslide, trapping the five of them inside. To pass the time until their eventual rescue, the group shares stories of how each lost their virginity.

In Mitch's story, Lucy, an elegant prostitute, picks him up while he is hitchhiking and invites him to her fancy hotel room. Feeling nervous and inexperienced, he asks his ultra-cool yet dim-witted friend Jeff for pointers (which include "when in doubt, whip it out"). However, upon meeting Lucy, Jeff attempts to seduce her but fails, almost injuring her. When Mitch saves her and kicks Jeff out, Lucy repays him with mind-blowing sex.

Henry is forced to tell his story next. In preparation for a big Halloween party, he dresses as a ghost. Unfortunately, in addition to being unable to see out of the eyeholes, the costume looks identical to a Klan robe. Blinded, he accidentally stumbles upon a group of (flamboyantly gay) African-American thugs about to kill a young white woman. The thugs turn their attention to Henry, beat him senseless, and then skip off, singing and holding hands. The girl, convinced that Henry has just saved her life, instantly falls for him, and the two make passionate love later that night beside a giant pile of donuts.

Meanwhile, the camp's staff, in fear of a potentially expensive lawsuit, desperately search for the missing campers.

In Annie's story, she discusses her first time, back when she was working on her family's farm. One night, she discovers an attractive drifter who had broken into her house in search of food. Overwhelmed by her hormones, she gives him a lot more than cookies in the back of the barn, much to the dismay of the sheep.

Danny goes next: His flashback reveals that he was a pornography-addicted loser. While visiting the beach one day, he thinks he sees Penthouse Pet Sheila Kennedy smiling and winking at him, but quickly dismisses it as a mirage. Later that night, after being rejected from a double date with his brother, Danny returns to his room to find Kennedy waiting for him. While the two engage in lengthy foreplay, they are later joined by his brother's girlfriend, and they all participate in an orgy, which Danny mispronounces.

Finally, Miss Farmer tells her story: Back in high school, she was deeply in love with her psychotic, nerd boyfriend Dwayne. However, when Dwayne dumps her for another girl at the junior prom, she sucks up her pride and picks up two new boyfriends. The three of them proceed to have sex on a bowling alley lane.

As more time passes and oxygen levels in the cave diminish, the gang becomes convinced they will all asphyxiate. In a moment of truth, everyone admits that their stories were false. They are all still virgins. Determined not to die as virgins, they all participate in an orgy. The symphony of thrusts and moans triggers another landslide, opening the cave entrance and freeing everyone.

As the group returns to camp, a narrator reveals the characters' futures: Danny became a pornographic actor under the name "Dicky Long". Mitch became a priest and a staunch advocate of gay rights. Henry now works for the National Cheese Commissioners Board. After eight marriages, Annie had a nervous breakdown and became a vegetable. Miss Farmer runs the government's Wildlife Preservation program. The film's final shot shows her trying to make a large trout "fly away" by tossing it into the air.

== Production ==
According to Femmes Fatales, ”When an unknown Madonna was desperately seeking a film role, she auditioned for Troma’s 1983 T&A epic. THE FIRST TURN-ON! However, Heidi Bassett bagged the part.”

== Home media ==
The film was released on DVD in late 2009, with new interviews with Lloyd Kaufman and Michael Herz as well as new special features and an old Kaufman/Herz movie as an easter egg.

== Reception ==
A retrospective review finds that "The First Turn-On! appears like a calculated move from Troma to ride the wave of teen horndog cinema, blending summer camp shenanigans with Penthouse Letter fantasies, looking to reach adolescent audiences without the use of slapstick comedy from the 1930s. It's not a creative leap forward for the company, but The First Turn-On! is almost a complete idea from co-directors Lloyd Kaufman and Michael Herz, and that's an impressive achievement for the duo." Stephen Holden wrote in The New York Times that "The First Turn-On! is the kind of movie that looks so cheap even the rocks seem made out of cardboard."
