= Troma Entertainment =

American film production and distribution company

Troma Inc.
- Type: Private
- Industry: Films
- Founded: 1974; 52 years ago
- Headquarters: Long Island City, New York, United States
- Key people: Lloyd Kaufman; Michael Herz
- Website: www.troma.com

Troma Entertainment is an American independent film production and distribution company founded by Lloyd Kaufman and Michael Herz in 1974. It is the longest running independent film studio in the world. The company produces low-budget independent films, or "B movies", primarily of the horror comedy genre, all geared exclusively to mature audiences. Many of them play on 1950s horror with elements of farce, parody, gore, and splatter. The company is known for the cult film The Toxic Avenger (1984).

Troma has produced, acquired, and distributed over 1,000 independent films since its creation. Films produced and distributed by Troma include The Toxic Avenger and its sequels; Class of Nuke 'Em High (1986) and its sequels; Sgt. Kabukiman N.Y.P.D. (1990); Tromeo and Juliet (1996); Terror Firmer (1999); and Poultrygeist: Night of the Chicken Dead (2006).

In 2012, the company officially released many of its films on YouTube. However, its YouTube channel was eventually terminated for not meeting community standards.

As of 2023, Troma's slogan was "50 Years of Disrupting Media". Its slogan in 2014 was "40 Years of Disrupting Media". Before that, the slogan was "30 Years of Reel Independent Cinema". Another slogan the company has used is "Movies of the Future". The company also has its own streaming service called Troma Now.

== Company information ==
Troma films are B-movies known for their surrealistic or automatistic nature, along with their use of shocking imagery; some would categorize them as "shock exploitation films". They are known for overt sexuality, nudity, and intentionally sadistic, gory, and blatant graphic violence.

Troma reuses the same props, actors, and scenes repeatedly, sometimes to save money. At a certain point, however, this became yet another hallmark of Troma. Examples include a severed leg, a penis monster, and the flipping and exploding car filmed for the movie Sgt. Kabukiman N.Y.P.D., which is used in place of any other car that needs to crash and explode.

Troma has produced or acquired early films featuring several rising talents, before they were discovered, including:

- Oliver Stone in The Battle of Love's Return (1971), in which the future Academy Award-winning director made his debut as an actor
- Paul Sorvino in Cry Uncle! (1971)
- Vanna White in Graduation Day (1981)
- Kevin Costner in Sizzle Beach, U.S.A. (1981)
- J. J. Abrams in Nightbeast (1982)
- Vincent D'Onofrio in The First Turn-On! (1983)
- Michael Jai White in The Toxic Avenger Part II (1989)
- Billy Bob Thornton in Chopper Chicks in Zombietown (1989)
- Samuel L. Jackson in Def by Temptation (1990)
- Trey Parker and Matt Stone in Cannibal! The Musical (1993)
- David Boreanaz in Macabre Pair of Shorts (1996)
- James Gunn in Tromeo and Juliet (1996)
- Carmen Electra in The Chosen One (1998)

The studio prides itself on its self-imposed "Rules of Production":

1. Safety to humans
2. Safety to property
3. Make a good movie! (written in a smaller typeface than the first two)

== History ==
According to Kaufman, Herz came up with "Troma" as he tried to "think of the most ugly sounding word ever uttered by man" when they struggled to find a company name that hadn't yet been registered. In the mid-1970s, Kaufman and Herz began producing, directing, and distributing raunchy sex comedies such as The First Turn-On! and Squeeze Play!. Troma provided production support for Louis Malle's My Dinner with Andre, for which Kaufman served as a production manager.

In 1984, Troma had a hit with the violent comedy superhero film The Toxic Avenger. The film went on to become Troma's most popular, spawning sequels and an animated television program. However, following the financial demise of the company Troma itself, the sequels to the film were box office bombs, and the cartoon adaptation quickly ended. The Toxic Avenger character is now Troma's official mascot.

Kaufman's follow-up film to The Toxic Avenger was Class of Nuke 'Em High, co-directed with Richard W. Haines. The film was a hit nearly as successful, though it inspired two unsuccessful sequels, both following the financial demise of Troma. At one time, it was the highest-selling VHS release for Troma.

The Toxic Avenger was turned into a musical which debuted at the George Street Playhouse in New Brunswick, New Jersey, and opened in New York in the fall of 2008. The Toxic Avenger Musical book by Joe DiPietro, the author of the long-running I Love You, You're Perfect, Now Change and All Shook Up, was released the same year. The music is by David Bryan, keyboardist of the rock band Bon Jovi.

Soon after Class of Nuke 'Em High was completed and distributed, Kaufman directed Troma's War. Intended as a criticism of what it saw as Ronald Reagan's attempt to glamorize war, the story concerns a group of everyday people who crash land on a remote island, only to find it populated by an isolationist militia that intends to overthrow the US government. Troma's War was a box office bomb. In the aftermath of the film's poor performance, despite another stab at the superhero genre with Sgt. Kabukiman N.Y.P.D., Troma experienced financial hardship and tried to reestablish itself as a smaller company mostly out of necessity.

== Work since 1995 ==
From 1995 to 2000, Troma had a period of creativity and produced some of its greatest work. Kaufman directed three independent films, all distributed in limited theatrical releases: Tromeo and Juliet, a loose parody of Shakespeare's play; Terror Firmer, a slasher film loosely based on Kaufman's book All I Need to Know About Filmmaking I Learned from The Toxic Avenger, and an independent film sequel to The Toxic Avenger trilogy titled Citizen Toxie: The Toxic Avenger IV.

Troma's financial hardship worsened after the botched funding of a low-budget video feature titled Tales from the Crapper, which cost $250,000 despite most of the footage being completely unusable. India Allen, one of the producers, backed out of the film halfway through, and sued Troma, citing breach of contract, slander, sexual harassment, trade slander, and intentional infliction of emotional distress. Kaufman supervised a reshoot in an attempt to salvage the film, dividing the footage into two parts and recasting the film as a double feature. Tales from the Crapper was released on DVD in September 2004.

Currently, Troma produces and acquires independent films, despite financial hardships and limitations. Troma Films has distributed many films from third parties including Trey Parker's Cannibal! The Musical. Lloyd encourages independent filmmaking, making cameo appearances in many low-budget horror films, occasionally without fee. Among his more recent appearances is in former collaborator James Gunn's directing debut, Slither, and Guardians of the Galaxy.

Kaufman's long-time editor Gabriel Friedman co-directed and wrote the screenplay to his follow-up film, Poultrygeist: Night of the Chicken Dead, a musical zom-com which made its official New York premiere on May 9, 2008 (although the film had previewed numerous times on single screens for over a year). The film opened to positive reviews from Entertainment Weekly and The New York Times and was released in 2006 in theaters and in 2008 on DVD.

During the winter of 2010/2011, Troma produced a feature-length film Father's Day, which Kaufman calls "a response film to Mother's Day". The film was written and directed by the Canadian filmmaking team Astron-6, debuting October 21, 2011, at the Toronto After Dark Film Festival where it took home the top prize of BEST FILM, as well as five other awards. In 2012 Father's Day was featured on the cover of Rue Morgue magazine and won Best Feature Film, Best Director, Best Male Performance, and Best Special Effects at The Fantastic Planet/A Night of Horror International film festival. This is rare for a film that cost only ten thousand dollars to make. On October 31, 2012, Father's Day was refused classification in Australia, which makes it effectively illegal to sell or exhibit the film. A second censored version was eventually passed with an R18+ rating.

In August 2012, Troma released over 100 of its back catalog films on YouTube, many for free, some for 48-hour paid viewing. Its YouTube channel was terminated in 2020 and 2023 for not meeting community standards, but was later reinstated.

== Hollywood ==
On April 7, 2010, Kaufman confirmed that a PG-13 remake of The Toxic Avenger had been greenlit and was to be produced by Akiva Goldsman. It actually has not been the first attempt at a general audience-friendly version of the franchise, as Make Your Own Damn Movie! identified a previous deal with New Line in the early 1990s for a live-action take on the Toxic Crusaders.

Another 1980s Troma classic, Mother's Day (1980), was also to receive a remake, expected to be directed by Darren Lynn Bousman and produced by Brett Ratner. At the time, Kaufman also said that he was negotiating a deal for a remake of Class of Nuke 'Em High. Shortly thereafter, Troma and Starz Entertainment entered into an agreement for the production of Return to Nuke Em High as a two-volume title. The first volume was released in theaters and on home video. The second volume, delayed due to funding issues, was stated on its Kickstarter website in January 2017 to be nearing completion.

== Troma Now ==
In 2015, Troma launched a streaming service called Troma Now, which offers many of the films distributed by Troma to subscribers. The service offers subscribers a free trial month, after which they need to pay a monthly fee of US$4.99.

== Other work ==
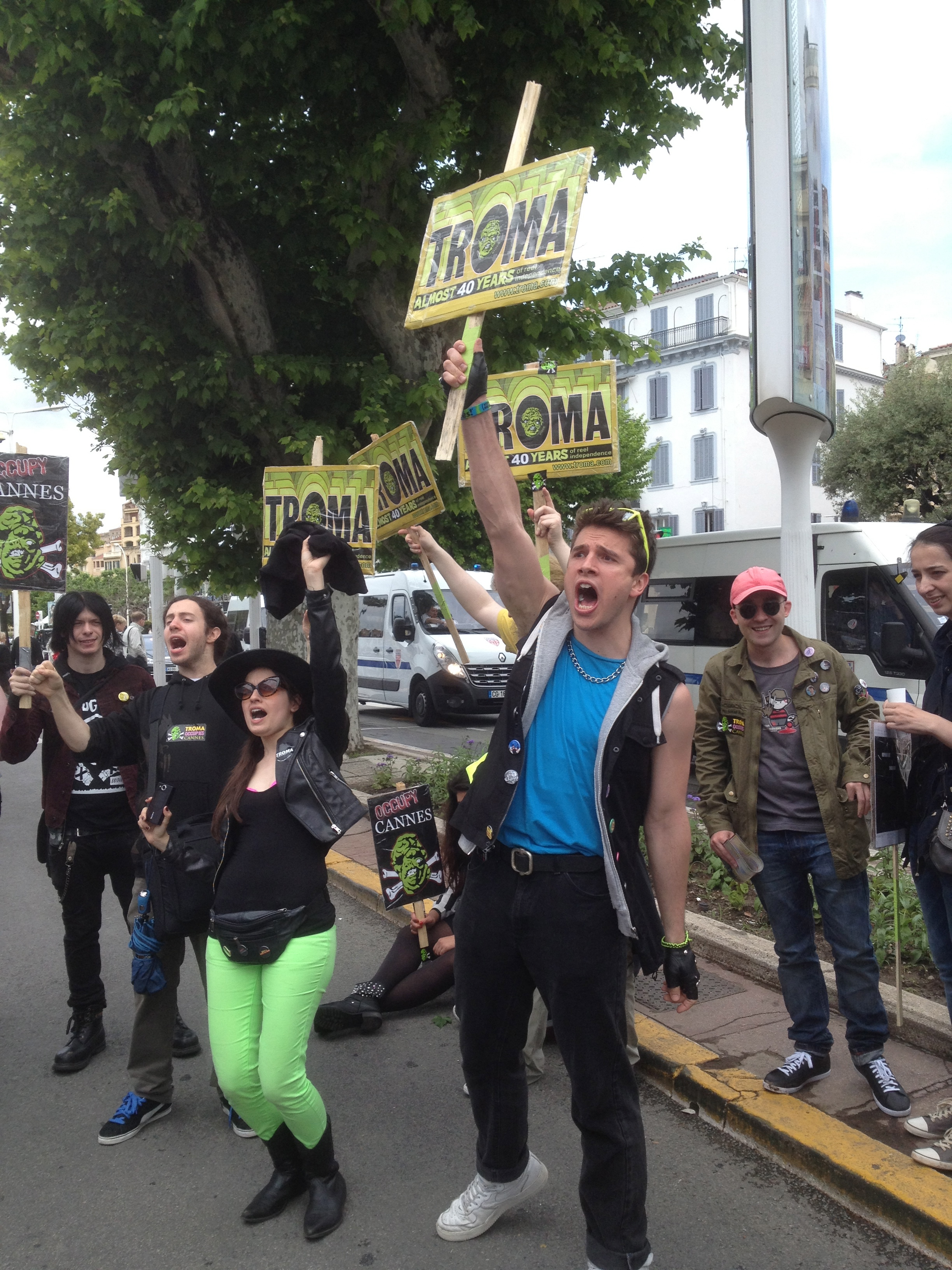
Protesters outside the 2013 Cannes Film Festival, demanding an award for Troma

=== TromaDance ===
Troma holds an annual Tromadance Festival, originally taking place in Park City, Utah at the same time as the Sundance Festival to accentuate their true independence from the mainstream. The festival screens submitted movies from independent filmmakers from around the world, the best of which are usually released on DVD by Troma or compiled in the Best of Tromadance series. In parallel, Troma acts as adviser to aspiring filmmakers with Kaufman teaching classes, contributing cameos and often releasing the finished films on DVD.

2009 marked the last time Tromadance was held in Utah; the festival was subsequently relocated to Asbury Park, New Jersey. In 2014, the festival moved to New York City, and since 2020 has been held at The Mahoning Drive-In Theater.

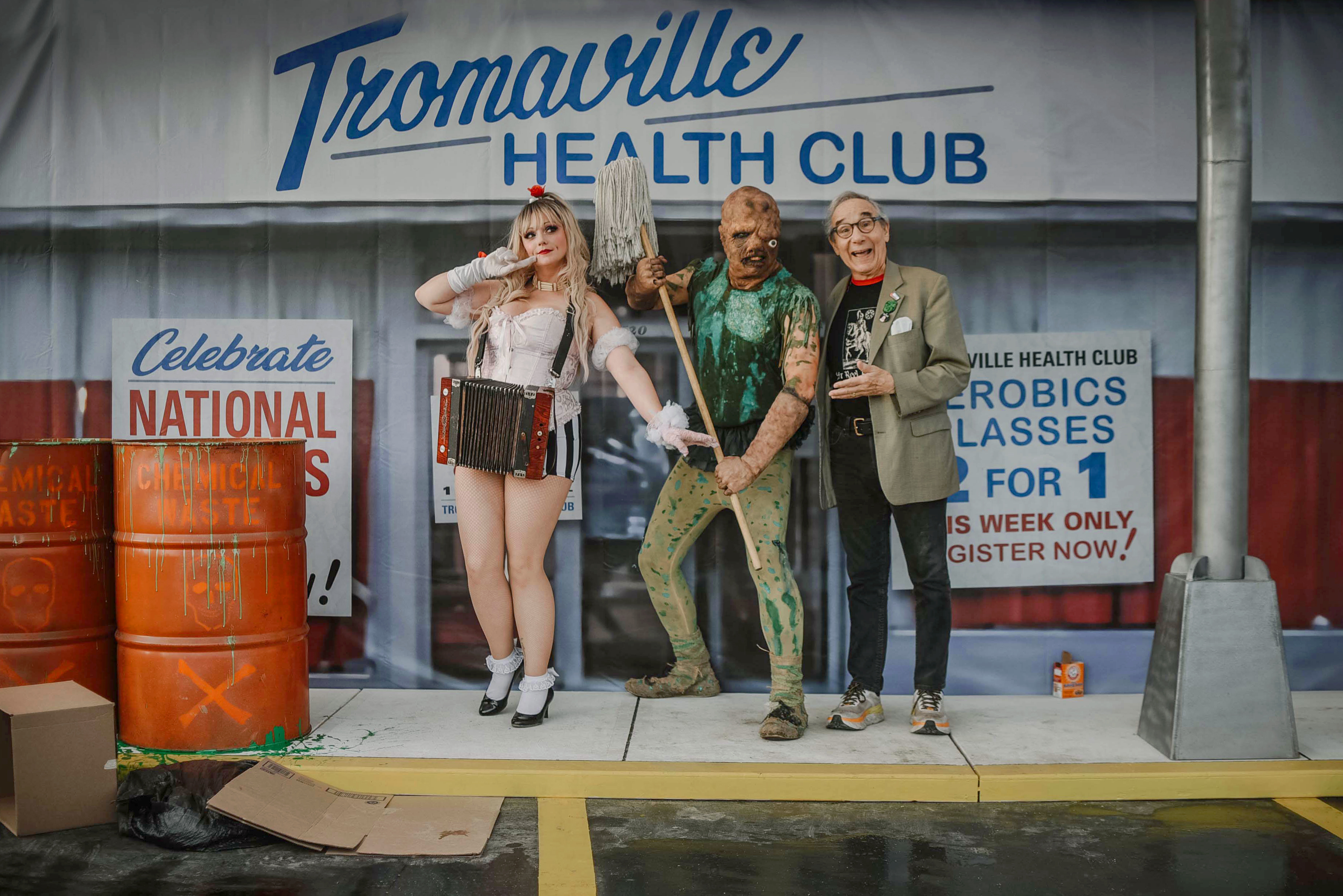
Lloyd Kaufman, Toxie, and Sara at Troma-Thon ‘22

=== Kaufman's books ===
Kaufman has also had some success with several non-fiction books and a novelization of The Toxic Avenger. Released in 1998, All I Need to Know About Filmmaking I Learned from The Toxic Avenger is an autobiography of sorts co-written with James Gunn. This book chronicles the history of the company, its films, and its iconic figurehead. Kaufman continued to draw on his experiences as Troma chief in the "how-to" filmmaking books Make Your Own Damn Movie!, Direct Your Own Damn Movie!, Produce Your Own Damn Movie! and Sell Your Own Damn Movie!. A DVD box set has been released to coincide with release of each of the first three books. In the video series, Kaufman interviews famous and infamous filmmakers about various filmmaking subjects.

In 2006, a novelization of The Toxic Avenger was released. It was co-written by Kaufman and long-time Troma employee Adam Jahnke.

Mathew Klickstein's 2025 book Lloyd Kaufman: Interviews, published as part of the University Press of Mississippi's long-running Conversations with Filmmakers series, collects more than five decades of Kaufman interviews and chronicles the intimate details of the story of Troma.

== Films distributed ==
Also see List of Troma Team Video titles for a complete list of films distributed by Troma Entertainment. Below is a list of some Troma-distributed films.

- A Nymphoid Barbarian in Dinosaur Hell
- B.C. Butcher
- Beware! Children at Play
- Blood Junkie
- Blood Sucking Freaks
- Cannibal! The Musical
- The Class of Nuke 'Em High series
  - Class of Nuke 'Em High
  - Class of Nuke 'Em High 2: Subhumanoid Meltdown
  - Class of Nuke 'Em High 3: The Good, the Bad and the Subhumanoid
  - Return to Nuke 'Em High Volume 1
  - Return to Return to Nuke 'Em High AKA Volume 2
- The Children
- Combat Shock
- Crazy Animal
- Def by Temptation
- Dumpster Baby
- Escape from Hell
- Father's Day
- Ferocious Female Freedom Fighters
- The First Turn-On!
- Friend of the World
- Hanging Woman
- Heavy Mental: A Rock-N-Roll Bloodbath
- Hectic Knife
- The Human Hibachi series
  - Human Hibachi
  - Human Hibachi 2
  - Human Hibachi: The Beginning
  - Human Hibachi 3: The Last Supper
- Homeless Joe
- Jefftowne
- Killer Condom
- The Last Horror Film
- Lust for Freedom
- Mad Dog Morgan
- Maniac Nurses Find Ecstasy
- The Middle Finger
- Monster in the Closet
- Moose Jaws
- Mother's Day
- Mr. Bricks: A Heavy Metal Murder Musical
- Nightbeast
- Pigs
- Poultrygeist: Night of the Chicken Dead
- Rabid Grannies
- Rednecks
- Redneck Zombies
- Scarlett Cross: Agents Of D.E.A.T.H.
- Screamplay
- Sgt. Kabukiman N.Y.P.D.
- Shakespeare's Shitstorm
- Sick Sock Monsters from Outer Space
- Sizzle Beach, U.S.A.
- Space Daze
- Surf Nazis Must Die
- Tale of Two Sisters
- Terror Firmer
- There's Nothing Out There
- The Toxic Avenger series
  - The Toxic Avenger (1984)
  - The Toxic Avenger Part II
  - The Toxic Avenger Part III: The Last Temptation of Toxie
  - Citizen Toxie: The Toxic Avenger IV
  - The Toxic Avenger (2023)
- Tony Trombo's Hick Trek 2
- Troma's Monster Kill
- Troma's War
- Tromeo and Juliet
- Vegas in Space
- The VHS Massacre series
  - VHS Massacre
  - VHS Massacre Too
- Victor Goodview
- When Nature Calls
- Yeti: A Love Story
- Zombiegeddon

== Films formerly distributed ==
Some titles formerly distributed by Troma Inc. have left the catalog. For instance, My Neighbor Totoro was originally released by Troma's subsidiary 50th Street Films, but only for a short time, and only for U.S. theatrical release. Others were briefly licensed for distribution on VHS such as Femme Fontaine Killer Babe for the C.I.A., which was one of Troma Team Video's original launch titles along with Sgt. Kabukiman N.Y.P.D. and Class of Nuke 'em High Part III: The Good, The Bad, and The Subhumanoid. Some titles, such as Maniac Nurses Find Ecstasy, are included on this list because they were previously listed but no longer appear in Troma's catalog.

- Angels' Wild Women
- The Astro-Zombies (as Astro Zombies)
- Baby Doll Murders
- Blood of Ghastly Horror
- Breakin' in the USA (breakdancing instructional video)
- Canadian Ballet
- Chopper Chicks in Zombietown
- Christmas Evil
- Club Life
- The Dark Side of Midnight
- Dracula vs. Frankenstein
- Dragon Gate
- Femme Fontaine Killer Babe For the CIA
- Fist of Fear, Touch of Death
- Ghost Ship (a children's feature film, not the horror film)
- Girls School Screamers
- Hi Mom!
- Hungry Young Woman
- I Spit on Your Corpse
- Invasion for Flesh and Blood
- Jakarta
- The Mommy series
  - Mommy
  - Mommy 2: Mommy's Day
- The Nick of Time
- Psycho A-Go-Go
- Pterodactyl Woman from Beverly Hills
- The Puppetoon Movie
- Recorded Live
- Rockin' Road Trip
- Romeo: Love Master of the Wild Women's Dorm
- Satan's Sadists
- Schlock (as Banana Monster)
- Space Freaks from Planet Mutoid
- Splatter University
- The Stendhal Syndrome
- Student Confidential
- That's My Baby!
- Together and Alone
- White Elephant: The Battle of the African Ghosts
- Wildrose

== Sub-divisions ==
Troma has also created/acquired specialty distributors for its films.

- 50th Street Films: distributes independent films aimed at a mainstream audience; distributed My Neighbor Totoro in theaters
- TromaDance: distributes films from Troma's film festival
- Roan Films:
  - Roan Archival Group Entertainment: distributes digitally remastered releases of classic films
- EG Sports: distributes golf instructional films by Michael Jacobs

== Tromaville ==
Most of the films made by Troma Entertainment take place in the fictional New Jersey city of Tromaville, known as the "Toxic Chemical Capital of the World." Examples include the Toxic Avenger films and the Class of Nuke 'Em High films. Another film worth mentioning takes place in a post-apocalyptic Tromaville titled A Nymphoid Barbarian in Dinosaur Hell. The following is a list of films that either take place in, or mention, Tromaville.

- The Toxic Avenger
- Class of Nuke 'Em High
- Troma's War
- The Toxic Avenger Part II
- The Toxic Avenger Part III: The Last Temptation of Toxie
- A Nymphoid Barbarian in Dinosaur Hell
- Sgt. Kabukiman N.Y.P.D.
- Class of Nuke 'Em High 2: Subhumanoid Meltdown
- Class of Nuke 'Em High 3: The Good, the Bad and the Subhumanoid
- Tromeo and Juliet
- Citizen Toxie: The Toxic Avenger IV
- Poultrygeist: Night of the Chicken Dead
- Father's Day
- Return to Nuke 'Em High Volume 1
- The Return of Dolphinman (short film)
- Dolphinman vs Turkeyman (short film)
- Dolphinman Battles the Sex Lobsters (short film)
- Return to Return to Nuke 'Em High AKA Volume 2
- Shakespeare's Shitstorm
- Toxie Goes to the Drive-In (short film)
