= Squeeze Play! =

1979 film by Michael Herz, Lloyd Kaufman

- DVD cover
- Directed by: Lloyd Kaufman
- Written by: Lloyd Kaufman; Charles Kaufman; Haim Pekelis
- Produced by: Michael Herz; Lloyd Kaufman
- Starring: Jim Harris; Jennifer Hetrick; Rick Gitlin; Helen Campitelli; Al Corley; Kaye Bramblett (as Sharon Kyle Bramblett); Mike Starr
- Distributed by: Troma Entertainment
- Release date: September 24, 1979
- Running time: 88 minutes
- Country: United States
- Language: English
- Budget: $300,000 or $150,000
- Box office: $4.65 million

Squeeze Play! is a 1979 American comedy film directed by Lloyd Kaufman.

== Plot ==
A group of New Jersey women, upset over their boyfriends' tendency to pay more attention to softball than to their love lives, decide to beat them at their own game... literally. The girls form their own softball team and challenge the men to a match out on the field. The men initially scoff at the idea but soon grow nervous, fearing they will lose face if they refuse to play.

== Cast ==
- Jim Harris as Wes
- Jennifer Hetrick as Samantha (credited as Jenni Hetrick)
- Richard Gitlin as Fred (credited as Rick Gitlin)
- Helen Campitelli as Jamie
- Rick Khan as Tom (credited as Rick Kahn)
- Diana Valentien as Maureen
- Al Corley as Buddy (credited as Alford Corley)
- Melissa Michaels as Mary Lou
- Michael P. Moran as "Bozo"
- Sonya Jennings as Maxine "Max"
- Kaye Bramblett as Midge (credited as Sharon Kyle Bramblett)
- Zachary as Pop
- Tony Hoty as Koch
- Lisa Beth Wolf as Rose
- Brenda K. Starr as Brenda (credited as Brenda Kaplan)
- Steven Kaman as Russ (credited as Steven W. Kaman)
- Kenneth Raskin as Mr. Beasley
- Edward D. Phillips as Chester Whatley
- Rosemary Joyce as Wanda
- Precious Colquitt as Maureen's Mother
- Joyce Anne Finney as Maureen's Baby
- Vic Hammer as Godfrey
- Stanley Kaufman as Mr. Van Hooten (credited as S. Lloyd Kaufman Sr.)
- Irwin Keyes as Bouncer
- Deborah Jean Templin as The Clown
- Norman Greenhut as The Wet T-Shirt M.C.
- George H. Beane as The Chic Bartender (credited as George Beane)
- Jon Palino as Mike
- Elizabeth Reisner as Belly Dancer In Bar / Leopard Bikini Girl On Beach / Face Slapper
- Mike Starr as Salon Proprietor

== Production ==
The idea of Squeeze Play! came from a suggestion that Kaufman and Herz should make a movie about a women's softball team and their amorous adventures. Kaufman added the comedy element, and, along with his brother Charles and screenwriter Haim Pekelis, he worked out a 75-page screenplay; the Kaufmans provided ideas for sight gags and jokes, and Pekelis developed the plot.

Partly filmed in Leonia, New Jersey, including scenes at Leonia High School and Sylvan Park.

== Reception ==
Once Squeeze Play! was completed, the reactions were almost unanimously negative. Major studios refused to distribute it, and two of the film's executive producers demanded to have their names taken off of it.

Squeeze Play! finally made its theatrical debut as a double feature with The In-Laws in Norfolk, Virginia to tremendous success. The film built up a steady following in Virginia before being widely distributed nationwide. The film was constantly in Variety’s top 50 list.

Janet Maslin of NYT called it "a zesty movie of its kind, though its kind is bound to seem stupid to some and objectionable to others ... the actors are fresh and likable, and at least they don't stand still long enough to wear out their welcome." Variety wrote that the film "does to softball what 'Animal House' and 'Meatballs' did to college and summer camp. But if they rated tastelessness, this battle of the sexes on the diamond would handily outscore the other bawdy pics hands down." Gene Siskel of the Chicago Tribune gave the film 0/4 stars and called it "not much more professional than a home movie." He revealed that he walked out on the film, "which is something I rarely do more than once or twice a year. But when one of the male characters reached into his nose and pulled out some snot and placed it in the beard of a bully, I had enough."

== See also ==
- List of baseball films
- Women in baseball
