= Poultrygeist: Night of the Chicken Dead =

2007 parody film by Lloyd Kaufman

- Theatrical release poster
- Directed by: Lloyd Kaufman; Gabriel Friedman (uncredited)
- Written by: Daniel Bova; Gabriel Friedman; Lloyd Kaufman
- Produced by: Andy Deemer; Michael Herz; Lloyd Kaufman; Pat Swinney Kaufman; Kiel Walker
- Starring: Jason Yachanin; Kate Graham; Allyson Sereboff; Robin Watkins
- Cinematography: Brendan C. Flynt
- Edited by: Gabriel Friedman
- Music by: Duggie Banas
- Distributed by: Troma Entertainment
- Release date: December 29, 2007 (New York)
- Running time: 103 minutes
- Country: United States
- Language: English
- Budget: $500,000
- Box office: $22,623

Poultrygeist: Night of the Chicken Dead is a 2007 black comedy musical horror film directed by Lloyd Kaufman and co-directed by Gabriel Friedman from a screenplay by Friedman and Daniel Bova. The film centers around the takeover of a New Jersey fried chicken fast food restaurant by possessed zombie chickens after it is built on top of a sacred Native American burial ground. The film premiered in April 2007, and was released in 2008 on DVD by Troma Entertainment.

== Plot ==
High school sweethearts Arbie (Jason Yachanin) and Wendy (Kate Graham) attempt to consummate their relationship in the Tromahawk Native American burial ground. Arbie is upset because Wendy is going off to college without him, but Wendy promises to him that she will always stay faithful to him. The two leave in disgust when they see a gravedigger watching and masturbating to them, but he is killed by zombie hands spouting from the ground.

One college semester later, when Arbie returns to the spot of his one and only sexual encounter, he is shocked to discover two unsettling realities: not only has the burial ground been bulldozed and replaced by an American Chicken Bunker, a mega-conglomerate fast food franchise, but college has turned his dear Wendy into a "left-wing, lipstick lesbo liberal", protesting the construction of the building with her activist girlfriend Micki (Allyson Sereboff). Disillusioned and out for revenge, Arbie decides to get a job at the American Chicken Bunker. Under the supervision of paranoid manager Denny, Arbie is thrust into the monotony of minimum wage with a variety of colorful people: the effeminate Mexican Paco Bell (Khalid Rivera), the animal-loving redneck Carl Jr. (Caleb Emerson), the burqa-clad Muslim Hummus (Rose Ghavami) and a mysterious 60-year-old man in the restaurant's basement who has worked as their costumed mascot all his life and has a virtually identical background to Arbie.

While grinding meat, Paco is pushed into the meat grinder by an uncooked chicken. General Lee Roy decides to let Paco get turned into a sloppy joe sandwich. Arbie begins to unravel a sinister plot involving the spirits of disenfranchised Native Americans and the billions of slaughtered chickens sent to the "concentration coops" who plan on exacting their revenge in the most gruesome ways possible, after being told so by Paco, now reanimated as a sandwich. Carl Jr, who is having intercourse with an uncooked chicken in the storage room, fights the chicken when it starts biting his penis. Hummus manages to kill it by shoving a broom up Carl's backside, though it tears off his penis. General Lee Roy insists not to take him to a hospital and to give the chicken (which has been sprayed with blood and green ichor from earlier) to the protesters outside. Carl Jr. is killed when Arbie gives him alcohol to drink. When Mickie declares the chicken to be delicious, the protesters go inside the restaurant to eat it. Wendy later discovers Mickie was paid by General Lee Roy to endorse it, to which breaks up with her and returns to Arbie. The poisoned chicken sickens customers, and Lee Roy, forced to try it, enjoys it briefly before succumbing to diarrhea. General Lee Roy lays an egg in the bathroom and is attacked by the chicken that hatches from the egg, before biting its head off and is sprayed with green blood. He becomes a giant egg and hatches into a chicken zombie. Denny leads everyone to the kitchen's back and, as he recounts his first chicken encounter (like 1975's Jaws (film)), is decapitated by the General.

The customers, workers, and protesters then all turn into zombie chickens, and proceed to mangle and kill everyone. The mascot (Lloyd Kaufman) shoots all of them with an M-16 machine gun. The General Lee Roy zombie returns, but is shot down by the mascot. Just before he can go for the death shot, he gets interrupted and has his nose ripped off by a now zombie chicken Denny. Arbie then shoots and kills Denny. Wendy turns the open/closed sign to "closed", which keeps the chicken zombies at bay to ensure an epidemic be for naught. The mascot, who is still alive, tells Arbie that he is his future self. He then turns into a chicken zombie. Mickie, who attempts to escape, is turned into a zombie chicken. She and the Mascot chicken zombie chase after Arbie and Wendy. Hummus drinks meat steroid in an attempt to save them and accidentally kills herself in the process. Arbie and Wendy soon figure out that beer kills the chicken zombies and manage to kill the Mickie and mascot zombie. They run out of beer and are saved by Hummus (who is still alive, despite having exploded a few minutes earlier). They find a child hiding in the storage room and are attacked once again by the General Lee Roy chicken. It is then killed by the Paco sandwich. Hummus is then shown to have explosives strapped to her body and tells them that she will sacrifice herself. Wendy, Arbie, and the little girl escape as the building explodes. While being driven home in a car, the child experiences stomach cramps after drinking a can of beer and begins to cluck like a chicken before laying an egg, frightening her, Arbie, and Wendy. Arbie loses control of the car and crashes, resulting in the car back-flipping before landing on the ground and exploding, thus killing all inside.

During the credits, various chicken zombies dance to a reprise of the movie's theme.

== Cast ==
- Jason Yachanin as Arbie, the film's dimwitted protagonist who joins the American Chicken Bunker in an act of spite against his ex-girlfriend, though he is still deeply in love with her.
- Kate Graham as Wendy, Arbie's bisexual ex-girlfriend reluctantly participating in a protest rally against the ACB.
- Allyson Sereboff as Micki, Wendy's girlfriend who leads the protest. She is actually one of Gen. Lee Roy's accomplices who is not only faking her vegetarianism but also her lesbianism.
- Robin Watkins as Gen. Lee Roy, the antagonistic villainous founder of the American Chicken Bunker, modeled after Colonel Sanders. He apparently has a diaper fetish.
- Joshua Olatunde as Denny, the paranoid manager of American Chicken Bunker.
- Rose Ghavami as Hummus, a Burqa-wearing Muslim line cook.
- Caleb Emerson as Carl Jr, a redneck fry cook with a sexual fetish for uncooked chicken carcasses.
- Lloyd Kaufman as Old Arbie, Arbie's future self.
- Khalid Rivera as Paco Bell, a gay Mexican ACB employee.
- Joe Fleishaker as Jared (credited as "Mega Herz"), a beloved national spokesman for a submarine sandwich diet.
- Gregory Paul Smith as Citizen of Tromaville turned Chicken Zombie
- Brian Cheverie as Father O'Houlihan, an Irish priest patron of the ACB who helps fight against the zombies.
- Ron Jeremy as Crazy Ron, a local eccentric who warns the ACB employees that they're all "doomed". He is a parody of Crazy Ralph from Friday the 13th.
- Debbie Rochon as Famous Actress Hit by Beer
- Keith White as Citizen of Tromaville
- Ruth Phelps as Red Lobster

== Production ==
Poultrygeist first began as a spec script of the same title submitted to Troma Entertainment by Daniel Bova around 2002. After a number of re-writes at the hands of several Troma employees, the script reached a final draft in 2004, completed by long-time Troma editor Gabriel Friedman. Then given the title Poultrygeist: Attack of the Chicken Zombies, Troma heavily promoted the film in the mid-2000s in an attempt to gain funding, though ultimately failed to secure adequate financing.

The crew of Poultrygeist stands before the "American Chicken Bunker". Director Lloyd Kaufman is on the far left.

The budget for Poultrygeist was roughly around $500,000, a typical budget for a Troma film. A large part of the film's financing came out-of-pocket from Lloyd Kaufman and Michael Herz, while Kaufman and his wife, Patricia Swinney Kaufman, dipped into their personal retirement savings to help fund the film.

Much of Poultrygeist's crew was made up entirely of volunteers who had answered advertisements posted by producer Andy Deemer and Troma on such websites as Craigslist and horror-based message boards looking for available crew members. According to Fangoria, hundreds of people applied, and volunteers traveled from as far as Sweden, Germany, Australia and numerous parts of the United States to work on the film, serving in various crew positions or as production assistants. Duggie Banas, who composed the movie's musical numbers, became attached to the film after answering an online ad looking for composers who'd be willing to work on a film for free. Many of the props and masks featured in the film were donations from special effects studios from around the world.

Shot on 35mm film by long-time Troma cinematographer Brendan C. Flynt, principal photography for Poultrygeist took place during the summer of 2005 at an abandoned McDonald's in the Bailey-Kensington neighborhood of Buffalo, New York. Over 80 crew members and 300 unpaid extras worked on the film. A nearby abandoned church was rented out by Troma, where over 70 cast and crew members resided for the duration of the shoot, despite only housing one working bathroom. Because the contract with the McDonald's location explicitly banned any nude scenes, all nude scenes were shot in the basement of the church, decorated to look like the McDonald's. The church did not have any similar clauses.

As chronicled in Poultrygeist's making-of documentary Poultry in Motion: Truth Is Stranger Than Chicken, the production was plagued with numerous problems, including malfunctioning special effects, delayed and over-scheduled filming, pay disputes with the actors and even the restaurant set being prematurely deconstructed on the last day of shooting. Despite the production hardships, Poultrygeist managed to successfully complete its principal photography by August 2005.

=== Connections with previous Troma films ===
In contrast to Kaufman's previous films, Terror Firmer and Citizen Toxie: The Toxic Avenger IV, which heavily referenced and relied on the audience's familiarity of Troma films, Poultrygeist is only loosely connected with the "Tromaverse" yet makes numerous background references to their previous films. Arbie can be seen wearing an "I Love the Monster Hero" shirt from The Toxic Avenger in an early scene, posters of Tromeo and Juliet and When Nature Calls adorn the walls of Wendy's bedroom, and DVD copies of Tales from the Crapper can be seen stuffed in a dumpster. Most notably, Poultrygeist features the infamous car flip stunt that was originally filmed in 1991 for Sgt. Kabukiman N.Y.P.D. and has been recycled for comic effect in every Kaufman-directed film since.

== Release ==
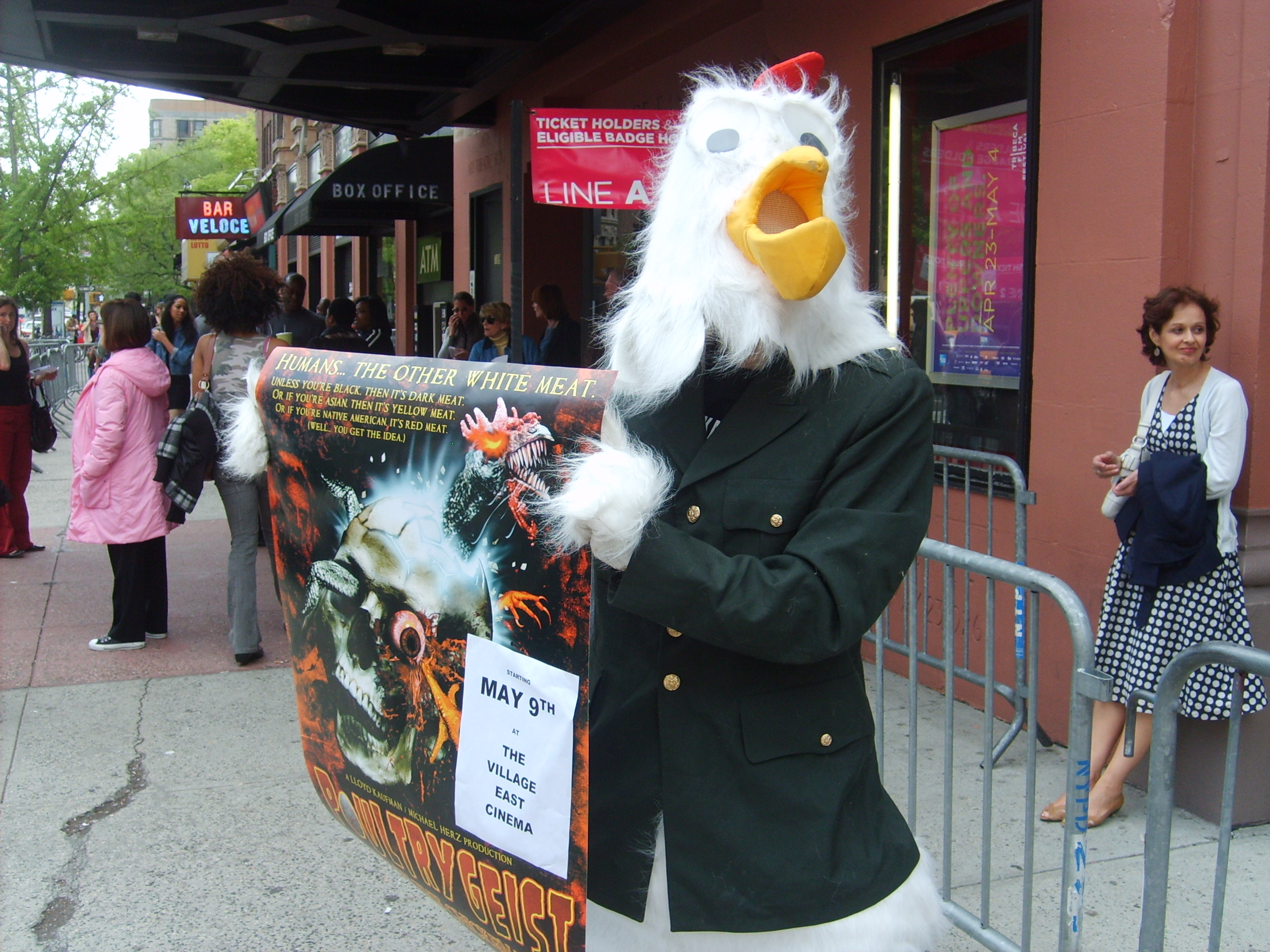
"Colonel Kluck" protests on behalf of Poultrygeist at the 2008 Tribeca Film Festival.

Press coverage of Poultrygeist began even in the earliest stages of the film's production. British publication Hotdog Magazine covered the film in 2005 while filming was still in progress, while Ain't It Cool News, Attack of the Show and Fangoria reported on the film throughout the stages of its post-production, with the latter giving Poultrygeist a full four-page feature in mid-2007.

Poultrygeist grossed $22,623. The film made its first premiere at the Brussels International Festival of Fantasy Film on April 14, 2007, and spent the remainder of 2007 playing international engagements in Amsterdam, Tel Aviv, Spain, and film festivals including the Toronto After Dark Film Festival, the Puchon International Fantastic Film Festival and the Calgary International Film Festival. The film began playing throughout the United States in early 2008, making its official cast and crew-attended premiere in New York City on May 9, 2008.

Poultrygeist played in New York through July 3, followed by two-week long run at the Laemmle Sunset in Los Angeles on June 14.

The film continued to make sporadic theatrical engagements throughout the United States up to and even after its official DVD release. On April 17, 2009, Poultrygeist had a wide release in the Midwest, opening simultaneously in 11 theaters in eight states, including two screens each in Wisconsin and Indiana.

== Reception ==
=== Critical response ===
On Rotten Tomatoes, the film has a rating of 64% based on reviews from 25 critics. The site's general consensus states that it "may be relentlessly tasteless and juvenile, but it's also a lively slice of schlocky fun".

Owen Gleiberman of Entertainment Weekly awarded the film a B+ rating, calling it "an exploitation movie with soul" and noting "it's genuine sick fun, and there isn't a boring moment in it". Nathan Lee of The New York Times spoke of the film as being "as perfect as a film predicated on the joys of projectile vomiting and explosive diarrhea can be", describing it as "liberating" in a "lowbrow way".

On the negative end of the critical spectrum, Roger Moore of the Orlando Sentinel felt the film "wears out its joke, like all Troma films, long before that last 50-gallon keg of fake blood is tapped...it's a 40-minute short struggling to escape a 103-minute feature", giving it a rating of two out of five stars. Time Out New York gave the film two out of six stars, claiming its "half-funny" "trashiness" only appeals to horror fans, while Slant Magazine was considerably harsher, rating the film half a star out of four, calling it "superficially turgid" and that its "strangely impressive originality doesn't even come close to compensating for its everything-plus-the-kitchen-sink midnight-movie awfulness".

== Home media ==
Poultrygeist was released on DVD on October 28, 2008, in an "Eggs-clusive 3-Disc Collector's Edition", which included a feature-length behind-the-scenes documentary on the film's production, directed by producer Andy Deemer and line producer Jason Foulke, deleted scenes, including an alternate ending with Ron Jeremy, an audio commentary from Kaufman and Friedman, footage of the NYC premiere, and seven behind-the-scenes featurettes.

The third disc was a "Kara-Yolk-E" supplement, featuring all of the musical numbers with an optional karaoke track added on.

On March 31, 2009, a two-disc "Special Egg-Dition" was released, omitting the karaoke disc. On February 23, 2010, the film was issued on Blu-ray.

=== DVD switch controversy ===
Poultrygeist made national news on January 7, 2011, when Sidney Klawitter from Orland, California, purchased a DVD cleaning kit from a local retailer, only to later discover the cleaner disc was a disguised copy of Poultrygeist. Klawitter was deeply offended by the film's content, noting "it was horrifying", calling it "a Triple-X rated movie". According to the owner of the store the cleaner kit was purchased from, the item had come pre-packaged from a warehouse distributor in Oakland, California. No charges were filed.

== Soundtrack ==
The soundtrack album for Poultrygeist was released on October 3, 2006, through Troma Entertainment, featuring the film's musical segments composed by Duggie Banas, snippets of film dialogue and a selection of punk rock songs from bands including The Dwarves, Zombina and the Skeletones, Scatterbox and Potshot. All copies of the soundtrack came with a bonus DVD featuring numerous special features including trailers and the first five minutes of the movie.

== Related media ==
=== Video Game ===
A video game titled Troma Presents: Poultrygeist was released on june 10th 2024, developed by Big Weasel Lil Weasel and Mike Fallek. Despite the games title and Troma's involvement, the game does not contain any elements or characters from the film.

=== Sequel ===
In 2025, a sequel titled Poultrygeist 2: Dawn of the Chicken Dead was announced, set to be written and directed by Mercedes the Muse and executive produced by Lloyd Kaufman and Michael Herz. The film premiered in August 2026, but later that month, Mercedes revealed that Kaufman and Herz had shelved the film due to its explicit content.
