= Tiffany Shepis =

American actress from New York City (born 1979)

- Born: September 11, 1979 (age 47); New York City, United States
- Occupation: Actress
- Years active: 1996–present
- Spouse: Sean Tretta (m. 2010)
- Children: 2

Tiffany Shepis is an American actress from New York City, who has been involved in film-making since the age of 16. She is popularly known as a "scream queen," having acted in several horror films.

== Career ==
Shepis got her start playing the part of Peter in James Gunn's first film Tromeo and Juliet. Shepis continued working in the genre she loved most, horror. Making several horror films a year, Shepis quickly became a fan favorite within the horror community in films such as Scarecrow, Syfy's Abominable the Sundance horror flick The Violent Kind and cult classic, The Hazing. Shepis was also a part of the record breaking Sharknado 2, the horror comedy The Night Watchmen, the anthology Tales of Halloween and has provided voice work for the Adult Swim TV show Robot Chicken. Shepis made the jump to Lifetime networks Christmas special The Holiday Proposal Plan, hosts popular genre podcast, Casualty Friday, and had a reoccurring role of Dr. Ohk on Star Trek: Picard.

Shepis married writer/director Sean Tretta in 2010. They have two children and currently reside in California.

== Filmography ==
=== Film ===
Year	Title	Role	Notes
1996	Tromeo and Juliet	Peter	
1998	Shampoo Horns	Amy	
1999	Terror Firmer	Beautiful Headcrushing Witness	
1999	Chickboxin' Underground	Xerxes	Video
2000	Emmanuelle 2000: Emmanuelle's Intimate Encounters	Biker Chick / Janice	(2 episodes)
2000	Citizen Toxie: The Toxic Avenger IV	Beautiful Interpretative Dancer	
2000	Everything for a Reason	Joanne	
2002	Ted Bundy	Tina Gabler	
2002	Embrace the Darkness 3	Anna	Video
2002	Death Factory	Alexa	Video
2002	Vinyl Dolls	Finola	Video
2002	Scarecrow	Judy Patterson	Video
2002	Smoke Pot Till You Fucking Die	Maya	Video
2003	Bloody Murder 2: Closing Camp	Angela	Video
2003	Delta Delta Die!	Patrice	Video
2003	The Ghouls	Ghoul Victim	Video
2003	Detour	Tiffany	Video
2004	The Hazing	Marsha	Alternate title: Dead Scared
2004	The Deviants	Marina	
2004	Corpses	Rhonda Winston	Video
2004	Devils Moon	Zelda	Video
2005	The Basement	Stephanie "Steph"	
2006	Abominable	Tracy	
2006	Dorm of the Dead	Amy	Video
2006	Nightmare Man	Mia	
2006	Hoodoo for Voodoo	Ayida	
2006	They Know	Cat	
2006	Revenge Live	Mrs. Repka	
2007	Nymph	Sarah	
2007	Pretty Cool Too	Tracy	
2007	Home Sick	Candice	
2007	Blood Oath	Janet	Video
2008	Chainsaw Cheerleaders	Lucinda	
2008	Promise	Bethany	
2008	Rule of 3	Dana	
2008	Dark Reel	Cassie Blue	
2008	Zombies! Zombies! Zombies!	Tiffany	Video
2008	Bryan Loves You	Cindy	
2008	Bonnie & Clyde vs. Dracula	Bonnie	
2008	12-24	Kate Preston	
2009	Good Boy	Daisy	
2009	Night of the Demons	Diana	
2009	Live Evil	"Spider"	
2009	Trade In	Crystal	
2009	The Queen of Screams	Naomi Stewart	
2009	Happy in the Valley	Courtney	
2010	The Violent Kind	Michelle	
2010	Do Not Disturb	Ava Collins	
2010	Godkiller: Walk Among Us	Angelfuck (voice)	
2010	Cyrus	Jill Danser	
2010	The Prometheus Project	Elizabeth	
2011	Insignificant Celluloid	Tiffany Shepis	
2011	Psycho Street	Leyla Barker	Segment: "Come on Down"
2011	Beg	Alice Monroe	
2011	Dirty Little Trick	Kelly	
2011	Bleed 4 Me	Lady Black	
2011	Outtake Reel	Sarah Donovan	
2011	Monsterpiece Theatre Volume 1	Jordan	Segment: "Moonlighting"
2011	Blocked	Julie Cruz	
2012	Paranoia	Sherry	
2012	The Frankenstein Brothers	Jane	
2012	Season of Darkness	Hope	
2012	Mountain Mafia	Tara	
2012	Dropping Evil	Dionysia	
2013	Axeman	Denise	
2013	Wrath of the Crows	"Princess"	
2013	Milwood	Katherine Rizzo	
2013	The Maladjusted	Fiona	
2013	Hallows' Eve	Sarah	
2013	Exit to Hell	Jenna	
2014	Attack of the Morningside Monster	Klara Austin	
2014	The Ark of the Witch	Sheri	
2014	The Pick-Axe Murders Part III: The Final Chapter	Adrienne	
2014	The Dance	Lisa	
2015	Chasing Yesterday	Miss Mackey	
2015	Caesar and Otto's Paranormal Halloween	Jamie Tremain	
2015	Tales of Halloween	Maria	Segment: "Trick"
2015	Doctor Spine	Darla	
2016	She Wolf Rising	Gina Skylar	
2016	Model Hunger	Debbie Lombardo	
2016	Uploaded	Cathy	
2017	The Night Watchmen	Stacy	
2017	The Black Room	Monica	
2017	Victor Crowley	Casey	
2017	Clawed	Donna	
2017	Psychotronic Fiction The Movie	Jennifer	
2018	Ouija House	Claire	
2018	Extremity	Betty	
2018	Strange Nature	Tina Stevens	
2018	Killer Kate!	Christine	
2018	Texas Cotton	Alexa Boozer	
2018	Tar	Marigold	Post-production
2019	Intrusion: Disconnected	Laura Braden	
2020	Star Light	Dorothy	Post-production
20??	Don't Let Them In	Rae	Segment: "Campfire Tales", pre-production
20??	Dawn of 5 Evils	TBA	Pre-production

=== Television ===
Year	Title	Role	Notes
1997	The Tromaville Cafe	Bulimia / Dementia	TV series
2000–2001	Troma's Edge TV	Bulimia	TV series
2008	The Last Doorway Show with Miss Misery	Tiffany Shepis	Episode: "Fangoria LA: Part Two"
2008	James Gunn's PG Porn	Sally	Episodes: "Peanus", "A Very Peanus Christmas"
2014	Sharknado 2: The Second One	Chrissie	TV film
2016	12 Monkeys	Sergeant Stavros	Episode: "Lullaby"
2023	Star Trek: Picard	Commander Ohk	Season 3 Episodes: "Disengage", "Seventeen Seconds", "No Win Scenario", "Imposters", "The Last Generation"
