= All I Need to Know About Filmmaking I Learned from The Toxic Avenger =

Semi-fictional autobiography of Lloyd Kaufman

All I Need to Know about Filmmaking I Learned from the Toxic Avenger
- Author: Lloyd Kaufman and James Gunn
- Language: English
- Genre: Autobiography
- Publisher: Berkley Boulevard
- Publication date: 1998
- Publication place: United States

All I Need to Know About Filmmaking I Learned from the Toxic Avenger is the biography of Lloyd Kaufman, co-written by Kaufman himself and James Gunn. The book was published by Berkley Boulevard (a subsidiary of Penguin Putnam) in 1998.

Kaufman is the co-founder of B-movie company Troma Entertainment and the director of such films as The Toxic Avenger, Class of Nuke 'Em High, and Terror Firmer. The book was written by both Kaufman and screenwriter James Gunn; they had previously collaborated on the 1996 film Tromeo and Juliet. Gunn went on to more mainstream prominence as the writer of Dawn of the Dead (2004) and the writer-director of Slither (2006) and the Marvel Studios film Guardians of the Galaxy (2014).

== Content ==
The book has an introduction by B-movie producer Roger Corman.

The book was written by Gunn after having numerous long interviews with Kaufman about his life and the history of Troma. It is written in a darkly humorous style, and is an unusual mish-mash of personal memories, how-to-make-movies advice, and pure flights of fantasy, such as the fictional ongoing struggles with the book's editor, Barry Neville.

Gunn explained:

Most of the scenes are real, though the dialogue had to be recreated. Some scenes, however, are pretty much fantasies – for instance, the fight scenes between Lloyd and Pat, and most of the stuff between Lloyd and the editor, Barry (who loved being our villain). In non-fiction, veracity is only important with people who might sue you. In a lot of ways the book was practice for melding fiction and fact, as I did in a more shadowy manner in The Toy Collector. Still, Lloyd's hyperactive voice was so clearly in my head that I think the book is an accurate representation of who he is.

== Editions ==
- ISBN 978-0-425-16357-3 (paperback, 1998)
