= The Toxic Avenger =

The Toxic Avenger may refer to:

- The Toxic Avenger (franchise)
  - The Toxic Avenger (1984 film), a 1984 American superhero comedy film
    - The Toxic Avenger (musical), based on the 1984 film
  - The Toxic Avenger (2023 film), a 2023 American superhero comedy film
- The Toxic Avenger (musician) (Simon Delacroix, born 1982), French DJ and producer

== See also ==
- Toxic Crusaders, an animated TV series based on the films
- All I Need to Know About Filmmaking I Learned from The Toxic Avenger, the 1998 autobiography of Lloyd Kaufman
