= Sgt. Kabukiman N.Y.P.D. =

1990 film produced by Troma Entertainment

- Promotional release poster
- Directed by: Lloyd Kaufman; Michael Herz
- Written by: Lloyd Kaufman; Andrew Osborne; Jeffery W. Sass
- Produced by: Michael Herz; Lloyd Kaufman
- Starring: Rick Gianasi; Susan Byun; Bill Weeden; Thomas Crnkovich; Noble Lee Lester; Brick Bronsky; Larry Robinson; Pamela Alster; Shaler McClure; Fumio Furuya
- Cinematography: Robert Paone
- Edited by: Peter Novak; Ian Slater
- Music by: Bob Mithoff
- Production companies: Namco Limited; Gaga Communications Inc.; Troma Entertainment
- Distributed by: Troma Entertainment
- Release date: 1990 (Tokyo International Fantastic Film Festival)
- Running time: 105 minutes
- Country: United States
- Language: English

Sgt. Kabukiman N.Y.P.D. is a 1990 American superhero comedy film directed by Lloyd Kaufman and Michael Herz, and produced and distributed by Troma Entertainment.

== Plot ==
The film follows Sergeant Detective Harry Griswold, a clumsy N.Y.P.D. cop investigating a string of murders involving kabuki actors and their families. While attending an amateur kabuki play, he witnesses thugs gunning down the entire cast. During his fight with the murderers, Griswold is forcibly kissed by one of the dying actors, unknowingly becoming blessed with the powers of kabuki. Before he knows it, Griswold finds out that he has the ability to transform into Kabukiman, a colorfully dressed slapstick superhero who has the ability to fly and access to such unique weapons as heat-seeking chopsticks, soba noodle restraints and a flame-throwing fan.

The murders were motivated by a prophecy which foretells the rise of a destructive entity known as The Evil One, who seeks to conquer Earth every thousand years, when mankind's inherent corruption has gone unchecked and the stars are in the right position. His nemesis is the Kabukiman, whose spirit is passed on until it emerges in the body of a chosen person at the time of that fateful conjunction. Maniacal billionaire Reginald Stuart is the Evil One's latest incarnation and responsible for the kabuki actor murders, an effort to prevent the Kabukiman's return. He also uses his influence to have the police investigation on the theater massacre dropped, and Griswold's superior Captain Bender takes him off the case despite his status as a direct eyewitness.

Confused, Griswold is confronted by Lotus, the beautiful granddaughter of the kabuki actor who passed the Kabukiman's spirit to him and who is resentful of Griswold because she expected to receive the Kabukiman's spirit herself. Later, Griswold transforms into Kabukiman and battles a group of Stuart's thugs assaulting his colleague Connie LaRosa, who was investigating the corrupt Reverend Snipes, who is in cahoots with Stuart. Enraged, Stuart has his chief thug Rembrandt murder LaRosa in the hospital. When Griswold insists on investigating the case and Captain Bender refuses him, he confronts Snipes on his own, who in turn calls Stuart's goons on him. Griswold tries to transform, but instead of Kabukiman he turns into a clown and is forced to retreat. After a chaotic street chase and the resulting public humiliation, Griswold is forced to turn in his badge. At the end of his wit, he seeks out Lotus, who helps him control his new powers, and he begins ridding New York's street of its criminal elements, gaining fame as a superhero. He successfully arrests Snipes and wrings a taped confession from him, and he and Lotus become romantically involved.

As the night of the conjunction approaches, Stuart has Lotus kidnapped to serve as a sacrifice for the Evil One's return. Rembrandt assaults Griswold at his home and strips him off his kabuki powers, but is in turn shot dead. With the aid of Lotus' pet monkey Toyota and an apologetic Bender, Griswold attacks Stuart and his men at the summoning site and frees Lotus, but the conjunction comes to pass anyway and Stuart transforms into the Evil One. Lotus helps Griswold turn back into Kabukiman, and while Griswold battles the Evil One, she disrupts the final stage of the summoning ritual, causing the Evil One to explode. Now rehabilitated, Griswold continues his life as New York's resident superhero with Lotus by his side.

== Cast ==
- Rick Gianasi as Harry Griswold / Sgt. Kabukiman
- Susan Byun as Lotus
- Bill Weeden as Reginald Stuart
- Thomas Crnkovich as Rembrandt
- Larry Robinson as Rev. Snipes
- Noble Lee Lester as Capt. Bender
- Pamela Alster as Connie LaRosa
- Shaler McClure as Felicia
- Fumio Furuya as Sato
- Jeff Wineshmutz as Hernandez
- Joe Fleishaker as Joseph
- Brick Bronsky as Jughead

== Production ==
While filming The Toxic Avenger Part II in Japan, where the first Toxic Avenger film had been a major hit, Kaufman and Herz were approached by Tetsu Fujimura and Masaya Nakamura of Namco to create a kabuki-themed superhero film, supposedly based on an idea by Kaufman. Namco became a producer, giving Troma a $1.5 million dollar budget to begin preproduction. The film was partially underwritten by the Japanese company Gaga Communications Inc.

At a total of $4 million, Sgt. Kabukiman N.Y.P.D. was Troma's most expensive film at the time of its production. A kabuki theater was constructed at Stevens Institute in Hoboken, New Jersey, for the film. Shooting took place in Hoboken, as well as in Manhattan and Brooklyn, New York.

Creative differences troubled production from the start; both Namco and Herz wanted a mainstream-accessible film geared towards teenagers, whereas Kaufman wanted the usual Troma-esque sex and violence style. The film was eventually cut into both PG-13 and R-rated versions.

== Release ==
Sgt. Kabukiman N.Y.P.D. premiered at the American Film Institute in 1990. Although Kaufman screened Kabukiman at the Cannes Film Festival for several years, the film did not see theatrical distribution until 1996, when the PG-13 cut was exhibited.

== Reception ==
Stephen Holden, writing for The New York Times, called the film "funny in a Mad Magazine-manque sort of way", and concluded: "Is Sergeant Kabukiman a movie that bashes the Japanese? Of course it is. But the punishment it metes out is about as vicious as administering 40 lashes with a wet sesame noodle." A reviewer for the New York Daily News gave the film a score of two-and-a-half stars, writing that, "Amid the effluvia-driven slapstick, gross-out gags, fat jokes and cheerfully cheesy FX, Sgt. Kabukiman offer some legitimately funny sequences. And it benefits from Gianasi's likeable, physically adept performance."

In 2010, Sgt. Kabukiman was included in the book 150 Movies You Should Die Before You See by Steve Miller, who wrote that, "although it's technically one of Lloyd Kaufman's best pictures — he actually had a budget for special effects this time — his attempt to be both mild and spicy means it ends up being mostly bland." Gene Siskel and Roger Ebert reviewed it on their TV show in 1996, though it's not clear whether they had seen the R-rated or PG-13 versions (the recap at the end of the episode did not list any rating for the film). They gave it two thumbs down, with Roger liking it more than Gene, but both men agreeing it was a poorly-made exploitation film that was mildly amusing but not something they'd recommend to viewers.

== Legacy ==
Since the film's video debut in 1990, Sgt. Kabukiman has gone on to make several appearances in the "Tromaverse", becoming one of the company's most well-known mascots next to The Toxic Avenger. Kabukiman (played by Paul Krymse in a simpler costume) can be seen in a number of Troma commercials and video introductions throughout the 1990s. Most notably, Kabukiman was one of the prominent figures on Troma's Edge TV, where he appeared in a short parody of old public service announcement films, entitled Sgt. Kabukiman Public Service Announcement, directed by former Troma employee James Gunn.

Plans for a Sgt. Kabukiman N.Y.P.D. animated series also went into the works, however the series never went to production. An animated teaser was completed and has since been made available as a bonus feature on the Sgt. Kabukiman N.Y.P.D. DVD. The cartoon was to feature the Kabukiman character, and a number of Japanese themed super-heroes fighting crime in New York, with similar parallels to Troma's other animated spin-off, Toxic Crusaders.

Kabukiman makes an appearance in 2001's Citizen Toxie: The Toxic Avenger IV, played once again by Paul Kyrmse. In Citizen Toxie, Kabukiman has gone "from a serious superhero to a pathetic, drunken has-been who is looked upon with disdain by the citizens of Tromaville", states film critic Chris Gore. This change in character persona is attributed to fan backlash from the original film. Kabukiman is also portrayed as "Evil Kabukiman" in an alternate universe: a less wacky, more threatening villain.

Since 2000, there have been rumors that a sequel, Sgt. Kabukiman L.A.P.D., would be made, but as of 2010, there are no plans to revive the series. A sequel/spin-off called Sgt. Kabukiman and the Lesbians of Bonejack High started production in early 2006, but was ultimately never finished.

Kabukiman makes an appearance in the upcoming Return to the Class of Nuke 'Em High alongside the Toxic Avenger in a party scene as a tribute to his similar cameo in Tromeo & Juliet from 1996.

Kabukiman appeared in the "We Are All Made of Stars" music video by Moby in 2002 with the Toxic Avenger, signing an autograph for Leelee Sobieski.

Most recently, in 2015 the character has returned to host a talk show for the TromaMovies YouTube channel called "Kabukiman's Cocktail Corner" where he interviews and interacts with a variety of performance artists including musicians (Unicorn Smack, The Cowmen, Circus Life) comedians (Dave Hill, Zac Amico, Brian Quinn), authors (Frank Casesse), tattoo artists (Paul Booth) and more. A first season has been completed and a second series is in production. The character is played by Doug Sakmann, who was passed the Kabuki-mantle from Paul Kyrmse in 2001.

=== The car flip ===
Footage of the car chase scene in Sgt. Kabukiman N.Y.P.D., which ends with a car flipping and exploding, was re-used in the 1997 Troma film Tromeo and Juliet. This was done not only for cost-effective reasons, but also because Kabukiman had yet to be widely distributed on video (and thus brought some confusion as to which film the footage originated).

Despite obvious continuity flaws, Troma has managed to fit the same footage into each of their films as a tongue-in-cheek homage, including Terror Firmer, Citizen Toxie: The Toxic Avenger IV, Poultrygeist: Night of the Chicken Dead, Return to Nuke 'Em High Volume 1 and #Shakespeare'sShitstorm. It also appeared at the end (along with a cameo by Lloyd Kaufman) of the 2011 Xbox Kinect video game The Gunstringer.
