= Bill Weeden =

American film and stage actor (born 1940)

- Born: August 8, 1940 (age 86); Melbourne, Florida, U.S.
- Education: Yale University
- Years active: 1965–present
- Spouse: Dolores McDougal (m. 1995)

Bill Weeden (born August 8, 1940) is an American film and stage actor, comedy writer, and songwriter.

== Early life ==
Weeden was born on August 8, 1940, in Melbourne, Florida He graduated from Yale University in 1962.

== Film and television career ==
Weeden is known for his work in genre film, starring in a number of Troma productions and other indie films, including playing the lead villain, Reginald Stuart, in Sgt. Kabukiman N.Y.P.D. (1990). He was called the "Troma Olivier" by the New York Post for the performance.

Weeden starred in Rachel Mason's rock-opera The Lives of Hamilton Fish (2013) as the serial killer Hamilton Fish, whose life is contrasted with the lawmaker with the same name.

Weeden is the only actor in the "slow cinema" film Byron Jones.

In 2020, Weeden starred as the protagonist, Dr. ZOOmis, alongside Kansas Bowling in the parody film Psycho Ape!. He reprised his role in the 2024 sequel, Psycho Ape: Part II - The Wrath of Kong.

In 2021, Weeden received a Best Actor award for his leading performance as a conflicted war veteran in the suspense-drama short film RedSin.

Weeden stars in the mockumentary film The Once and Future Smash, which premiered at FrightFest in London in August 2022 and at Screamfest in Los Angeles in October 2022.

Weeden starred in the 2024 film Special Needs Revolt as the villain, President Kruger. The film premiered at Amazing Fantasy Fest in Buffalo, NY in September 2024.

== Stage career ==
Weeden is the composer of the Broadway show Hurry, Harry (opened 1972) and composed additional material for the Broadway show I'm Solomon (opened 1968).

Weeden played Hucklebee in the final cast of the original Sullivan Street production of The Fantasticks, which closed in 2002. He was also featured in Try to Remember: The Fantasticks, a documentary examining the history of the show.

He created two original musical revues with performing and writing partners David Finkle and Sally Fay (as Weeden, Finkle & Fay) for the New York production company Playwrights Horizons and a children's musical, Babar's Birthday, for Theatreworks/USA. The trio also toured as major market performers for a show organized by Fortune Magazine specifically to entertain and court potential advertisers, even receiving front-page coverage for the act in the Wall Street Journal. The trio also wrote the musical Move It and It’s Yours, which has been performed numerous times in regional theater.

The musical revue Into the Weeds: Selections from the Bill Weeden Songbook features Weeden's songs, including his various collaborations.

Weeden has also performed in a number of off-Broadway and touring shows, including an East Village outdoor production of As You Like It, George Bataille's Bathrobe, The Magnificent Ambersons, an Atlantic City production of Little Shop of Horrors, The Rocky Horror Show, The Wizard of Oz, and Damn Yankees.

Weeden (with Finkle and Fay) contributed several songs to The No-Frills Revue, the 1987 off-Broadway musical conceived by Martin Charnin.

== Comedy ==
Weeden has written comedy material, often with writing partner David Finkle, for Lily Tomlin, Carol Channing, Stiller & Meara, Dick Shawn, Madeline Kahn, and others.

Weeden, Finkle & Fay's "Part of the Problem (The Inflation Song)" was released on 7" on MCA Records in 1980.

Weeden has often collaborated with Upright Citizens Brigade, including the comedy video "Author Wrote a F***ing Book," a parody of James Patterson's commercials, written by Achilles Stamatelaky and directed by Ryan Hunter.

Weeden played the father of correspondent/comedian Jordan Klepper on a 2015 episode of The Daily Show.

== Other work ==
He has narrated a number of audio books, often paired with his wife Dolores McDougal.

The song "One Big Team" was written and performed by Weeden for the 1988 New York Yankees' Old Timer's Day, and in 2006 by Tony-winning Broadway star James Naughton on the YES Network's Yankees Magazine.

Weeden joins other horror filmmakers and performers, such as Larry Fessenden and Amy Seimetz, voicing the horror "radio" series Tales from Beyond the Pale.

Weeden appeared on episode 706 of SubwayTakes.

== Select filmography ==
- Sgt. Kabukiman N.Y.P.D. (1990) - Reginald Stuart
- Citizen Toxie: The Toxic Avenger IV (2000) - Abortion Doctor
- Never Again (2001) - Mr. Speedy
- Try to Remember: The Fantasticks (2003) - Self
- Bill W. (2012) - Financier
- The Lives of Hamilton Fish (2013) - Hamilton 'Albert' Fish
- Applesauce (2015) - Kate's Father
- The Ungovernable Force (2015) - Kevin
- Are We Not Cats (2016) - Diner Dad
- #ShakespearesShitstorm (2020) - Singing Executive
- Psycho Ape (2020) - Dr. ZOOmis
- Ramekins: Ramekin II (2021) - Jared
- RedSin (2021) - Gregg Schulls/Jack Polaski
- The Once and Future Smash (2022) - William Mouth
- Special Needs Revolt (2024) - President Kruger
- Psycho Ape: Part II - The Wrath of Kong (2024) - Dr. ZOOmis
