= Zombies! Zombies! Zombies! =

- Promotional poster
- Directed by: Jason M. Murphy
- Written by: Tony Giordano; Zack Kennedy
- Produced by: Jason M. Murphy; Tony Giordano
- Cinematography: Kenny Beaumont
- Edited by: Tony Giordano; Brad Tremaroli
- Music by: Chris Lott
- Distributed by: In The Dark Entertainment
- Release date: September 9, 2008
- Running time: 79 minutes
- Country: United States
- Language: English
- Budget: $500,000

Zombies! Zombies! Zombies! (also known as Strippers vs Zombies and released under this title in Japan and Germany) is a 2008 American zombie comedy film directed by Jason M. Murphy. It stars Jessica Barton, Tiffany Shepis, Hollie Winnard and Jay Laga'aia. It was filmed during 2007 and was released direct-to-video in 2008.

== Plot ==
Searching for the cure for cancer, a scientist creates a chemical that promotes cell growth. After being visited by a drug addict, the drugs and the cure are mixed up and misused by him and several prostitutes. They become zombified and begin biting people nearby. A small group of exotic dancers team up with the prostitutes' former pimp to defend their strip club, the Grindhouse, against a horde of blood-thirsty zombies.

Four strippers in a nightclub, after their dance routines are over and the club is closing for the night, walk over to a nearby cafeteria for breakfast, when some hookers turn into zombies and attack them. Except for one stripper Pandora, played by Juliet Reeves, who couldn't make it till the end, the other 3 ladies manage to fight and decimate all the zombies and survive through it all.

The prettiest and tallest of the 3 surviving strippers is Dakota, played by Playboy playmate Jessica Barton. She is the most popular (and most tipped) stripper of the club, but that comes with quite some attitude. During the course of the movie, she gives a lap dance to one of her lovers, but then he gets bitten and turns into a zombie. Dakota has to blow this lover-turned-zombie (as well as her boyfriend cop-turned-zombie) with her gun.

The second stripper is Dallas, played by Miss Oahu Lyanna Tumaneng. She is clearly the most courageous of the trio, as she braved zombie attacks to get the zombie antidote from the laboratory. The male lead Chris, played by Sean Harriman, was on the same mission alongside Dallas and managed to inject himself with the zombie antidote that they found in the lab. Eventually, Chris falls in love with her.

The third stripper is Chris' sister Harley, played by Playboy playmate Hollie Winnard. She is a single mom of a little daughter and they stay with Chris and their grandmother. This was Harley's very first night at the club, where she plays a nervous rookie and she performs a quick but funny tease.

During the beginning of the film the strippers have a difficult time identifying themselves to each other. They awkwardly introduce each other by their stage name, and their real names. Their indecisiveness in their career lead to differences in how strippers should be treated by themselves, others, and of course zombies.

As the battle between the zombies and the remaining survivors heats up, the zombies start to get the upper hand. Though the survivors are locked inside a safe room, the buxom hooker-turned-zombie named Pamela, as played by Stephanie Miller, manages to get inside. In the skirmish, Chris loses to her strength, as Pamela bites him and takes a chunk off his forehead. But thanks to the zombie antidote in his blood, Pamela is soon blown to smithereens. Harley and Dakota do not understand what happened, so Dallas explains that exposing Chris' blood to the zombies is a sure way to destroy them all. To test the idea, Chris offers his right hand to a zombie outside the door, and upon biting Chris, that zombie is blown apart as well.

Seeing the plan work so well, Dakota suggests that they should let 2 zombies into the room. The plan works well for the first couple of times, as 2 zombies are let into the room at a time, and after biting the shoulders of Chris, they are blown apart. But soon, a very weakened Chris collapses on the floor. Hell breaks loose, as all the remaining zombies manage to break into the room and attack them. With no other option to save the 3 girls, Chris gets up for his final action. He requests his sister Harley to take care of her daughter Jenna, whom Chris used to babysit back at home. He then gives a farewell kiss to his love interest Dallas. Chris offers himself to the pack of zombies, with the girls making no effort at all to stop him from doing so. At the outset, the zombies cut through Chris' ribs and eat up his heart, as the girls look on. Within a very short time, the zombies finish him off and then blow themselves apart as expected. The devouring of Chris by the zombies happens at a pretty high speed, instead of his arms, legs, torso, etc. being chomped step-by-step. Finally, all that is left of Chris are just some blood and flesh splattered on the club floor, along with that of the exploded zombies.

With all zombies finally eliminated, the 3 girls wipe the goo off their hair and walk out of the nightclub in supermodel catwalk style, smiles of victory writ large on their face. Their outfits are still smeared with flesh and blood of zombies and Chris alike. Out in the open daylight, Dallas smilingly comments to Harley that they had a rough last night. Harley replies that it wasn't as much fun as she had hoped.

== Cast ==
- Jessica Barton as Dakota
- Michael Clinkenbeard as Dr. Stewart
- Krystal Davis as Lou Ann
- Sean Harriman as Chris
- Anthony Headen as Johnny "BackHand" Vegas
- Juliet Reeves as Pandora
- Tiffany Shepis as Tiffany
- Valensky Sylvain as Clive
- Lyanna Tumaneng as Dallas
- Hollie Winnard as Harley
- Jay Laga'aia as The Carpark Victim

== Release ==
Zombies! Zombies! Zombies! had its world premiere on October 11, 2007 at the Universal Studios Cineplex in Orlando, Florida.

=== Home media ===
The DVD release was made available in the United States on September 9, 2008.
