= The Tromaville Café =

Original release
- Network: BBC
- Release: 1997 – 2000

The Tromaville Café is a television programme broadcast by the BBC in the United Kingdom from 1997 to 2000 that ran Troma films.

The show featured Lloyd Kaufman as himself, different actors portraying Toxie, Paul Kyrmse as Sgt. Kabukiman N.Y.P.D., Stephen Blackehart as Felix the French Trickster, and scantily clad Tromettes (Debbie Rochon, Stephanie Stokes, Tiffany Shepis, etc.) playing waitress/action news reporters. Another regular on the show was Joe Fleishaker, who portrayed Troma VP and co-founder Michael Herz.

== Cast ==
- Lloyd Kaufman as Self
- Jane Jensen as Self
- Paul Kyrmse as Sgt. Kabukiman N.Y.P.D.
- Stephen Blackehart as Felix the French Trickster
- Steve Loniewski as Steve / Beowulf
- Debbie Rochon as Host / Hypothermia
- Stephanie Stokes as Host
- Tiffany Shepis as Bulimia / Dementia
- James Gunn as Self / Mike the Crazy Boom Guy
- Joe Fleishaker as Michael Herz / God
- Jim Grindle as The Chupacabra.
- Tracy Mann
- Mike Shapiro as Baby / Billy / Lloyd's son
- Mandy Leigh as Melvina
- Jessica Dublin as Crazy Lady / Mrs Junko
- John Russo-Zirkel as Aiiiighhh
