= Jason Yachanin =

American actor

- Born: 1980 or 1981 (age 43–44); Brunswick, Ohio, US
- Occupation: Actor

Jason Yachanin is an American actor most known for playing Arbie in the comedy horror film Poultrygeist: Night of the Chicken Dead. He also appeared in the film Friends (With Benefits) and a segment of the film V/H/S.

== Filmography ==
- 2006: Poultrygeist: Night of the Chicken Dead - Arbie
- 2007: Kid Fitness (TV Series)
- 2008: Friends (With Benefits)
- 2010: Short Sighted (TV Series)
- 2012: V/H/S (Segment: "Tuesday the 17th") - "Spider"
- 2012: Supernaturalz: Weird, Creepy & Random
- 2012: Gerald (Short Film)
- 2015: Blue Bloods (TV Series) Season 5, Episode 20: "Payback" - "Sound Tech Guy"
