= James Gunn =

American filmmaker (born 1966)

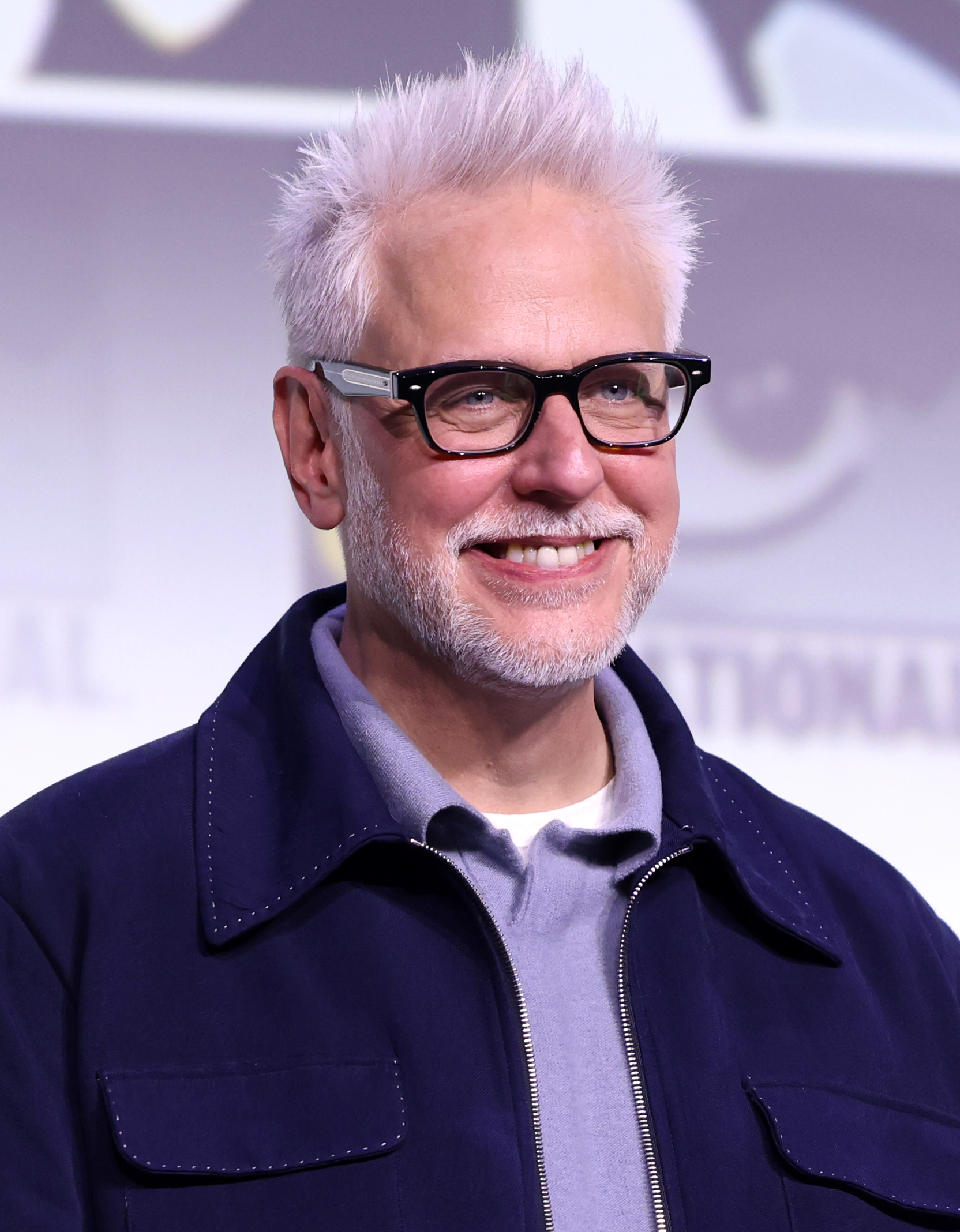
- Gunn at the 2025 San Diego Comic-Con
- Born: James Francis Gunn Jr. August 5, 1966 (age 60) (Note: While some sources give a birth year of 1970, Gunn graduated from St. Louis University High School in 1984, and other sources give his birth year as 1966.); St. Louis, Missouri, U.S.
- Education: Loyola Marymount University; Saint Louis University (BA); Columbia University (MFA)
- Occupations: Screenwriter; director; producer; studio executive
- Years active: 1989–present
- Title: Co-chairman and co-CEO of DC Studios (2022–present)
- Spouses: Jenna Fischer (m. 2000; div. 2008) Jennifer Holland (m. 2022)
- Relatives: Sean Gunn (brother); Matt Gunn (brother); Brian Gunn (brother); Mark Gunn (cousin)
- Website: Official website

James Francis Gunn Jr. (born August 5, 1966) is an American filmmaker and studio executive. He is known for his work as a screenwriter and director in the comedy, horror, and superhero genres, particularly for character studies with unconventional storytelling combining absurd humor, intense action sequences or violence, and emotional weight that often popularize lesser-known, misfit characters and feature themes of humanity, family, belonging, and redemption. His accolades include three Saturn Awards, an Emmy Award, and a Critics Choice Award, as well as a nomination for the Bram Stoker Award. Gunn became the co-chairman and co-chief executive officer (CEO) of DC Studios alongside Peter Safran in October 2022, with the duo set to be succeeded by Jeremy Latcham in December 2026.

Gunn developed an early interest in storytelling, making low-budget horror films, and initially pursued a music career. After studying writing at Saint Louis University and the Columbia University School of the Arts in New York, Gunn started his film career in the mid-1990s by working as a screenwriter for Lloyd Kaufman at his independent film studio Troma Entertainment, where he wrote Tromeo and Juliet (1996), a dark comedy B movie. He began collaborating with Safran on the superhero comedy The Specials (2000). Gunn began working with the major Hollywood studios when he wrote the films Scooby-Doo (2002), its sequel Scooby-Doo 2: Monsters Unleashed, and the Dawn of the Dead remake (both 2004). He subsequently made his feature film directorial debut with the body horror-comedy Slither (2006), followed by the dark comedy superhero film Super (2010), before transitioning to the mainstream superhero genre and receiving worldwide recognition with the Guardians of the Galaxy film trilogy (2014–2023) for Marvel Studios and its franchise, the Marvel Cinematic Universe (MCU).

Gunn continued working predominantly within the superhero genre with The Suicide Squad (2021) and its HBO Max spin-off series Peacemaker (2022–2025), the first of which he developed for the competing DC Extended Universe (DCEU) franchise after he was temporarily fired in July 2018 by Marvel owner Disney from directing Guardians of the Galaxy Vol. 3 (2023) over the resurfacing of controversial jokes he had made online. Warner Bros. Discovery subsequently hired Gunn and Safran in October 2022 to lead the newly formed DC Studios, creating its flagship franchise, the DC Universe (DCU). The decision to have a high-profile director like Gunn transition to a top executive position at a film studio was considered shocking and unprecedented. He particularly created DC Studios's and the DCU's first series, the adult animated Creature Commandos (2024–present), and wrote and directed the first DCU film, Superman (2025), a reboot of the Superman film franchise. He wrote and directed Superman's follow-up Man of Tomorrow (2027), which finished filming before his DC Studios exit.

His other contributions to creative works include writing and producing the action horror film The Belko Experiment (2016), producing the superhero horror film Brightburn (2019), and producing and conceiving the story for the live-action animation legal comedy film Coyote vs. Acme (2026), as well as writing and directing a segment in the anthology comedy film Movie 43 (2013), the parody web series James Gunn's PG Porn (2008–2009), and The Guardians of the Galaxy Holiday Special (2022) for Disney+. Gunn also co-wrote Kaufman's biography All I Need to Know About Filmmaking I Learned from The Toxic Avenger (1998) and wrote the novel The Toy Collector (2000) and the video game Lollipop Chainsaw (2012). Gunn has frequently collaborated with select actors who recur in his works.

== Early life ==
James Francis Gunn Jr. was born on August 5, 1966, in St. Louis, Missouri, to parents James F. Gunn, an attorney, and Leota "Lee" (Hynek). He was raised Catholic in the St. Louis suburb of Manchester, Missouri. He has five siblings – actor Sean, actor and political writer Matt, screenwriter Brian, Patrick, and Beth. Gunn is of Irish descent and Jewish descent. Gunn has stated that his family's surname was originally the Irish name MacGilgunn and that it means "sons to the servants of the god of the dead." (Note: However, other sources indicate that its literal meaning is "son of the brown youth.")

Growing up, Gunn was influenced by low-budget films such as Night of the Living Dead and Friday the 13th. He read magazines like Fangoria and attended genre movie screenings, including the original Dawn of the Dead at the Tivoli Theatre in St. Louis. At the age of 12, he began making 8 mm zombie films with his brothers in the woods near their home.

Gunn and his brothers all attended the Jesuit St. Louis University High School, where he graduated in 1984. He went on to earn a Bachelor of Arts from Saint Louis University. While at Saint Louis University, Gunn created political cartoons for the school's student weekly, The University News. Gunn said that, at an unspecified time in his college education, "I went to two years undergraduate film school at Loyola Marymount in Los Angeles. But I was pretty screwed up at the time, and had to leave. Years later I went to graduate school at the Columbia University School of Fine Arts but I studied prose writing, not film writing." He earned a Master of Fine Arts from Columbia University in 1995.

== Career ==
=== Music ===
While living in St. Louis, Gunn founded a band, The Icons, in 1989, serving as lead vocalist. The group released the album Mom, We Like It Here on Earth in 1994, and its songs "Sunday" and "Walking Naked" were featured in the film Tromeo and Juliet. The Icons disbanded in the mid-1990s. Gunn has continued to work in music, composing songs for Scooby-Doo, Scooby-Doo 2: Monsters Unleashed, and Movie 43.

=== Film and television ===
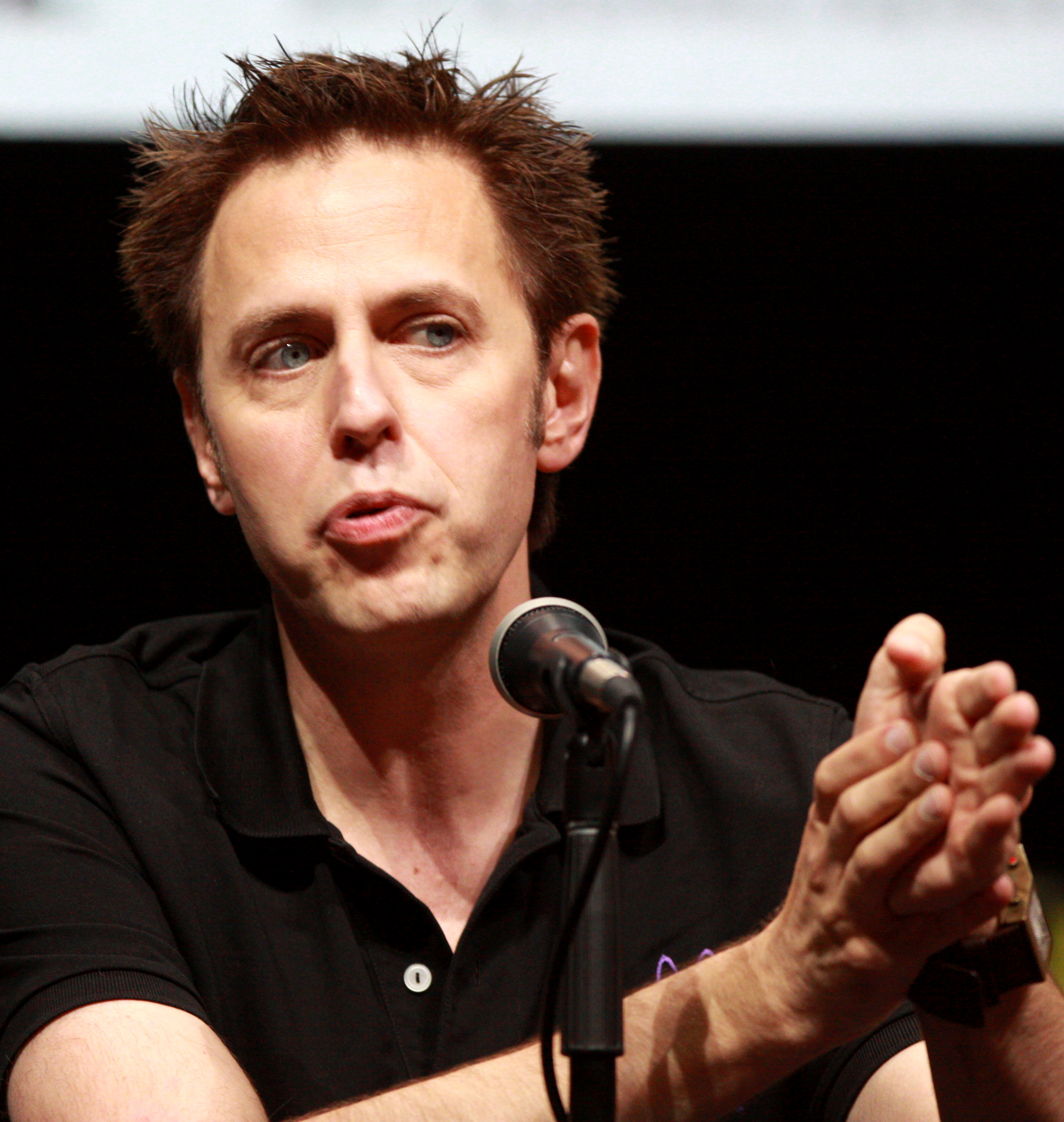
Gunn in 2013

Gunn began his career in filmmaking with Troma Entertainment in 1996, for which he co-wrote the independent film Tromeo and Juliet. Working alongside his mentor Lloyd Kaufman, the co-founder of Troma, Gunn learned how to write screenplays, produce films, scout locations, direct actors, distribute films, and create his own poster art. After contributing to several other Troma films, Gunn in 2000 wrote, produced and performed in the superhero comedy The Specials, directed by Craig Mazin and featuring Rob Lowe, Thomas Haden Church, Paget Brewster, Judy Greer and Jamie Kennedy.

Gunn's first major Hollywood screenplay was for the 2002 film Scooby-Doo. He wrote the screenplays for the remake of Dawn of the Dead and the sequel Scooby-Doo 2: Monsters Unleashed, both released in 2004. With these films, Gunn became the first screenwriter to have two films top the box office in consecutive weeks. That same year, he executive produced and starred in the mockumentary LolliLove, directed by and starring his then-wife Jenna Fischer. His film directorial debut was the 2006 horror-comedy Slither, which was included on Rotten Tomatoes' list of the 50 Best Ever Reviewed Horror Movies.

Gunn's next projects included the comedy short film "Humanzee!" which was originally intended exclusively for Xbox Live's Horror Meets Comedy series of short comedy films by horror directors; it was replaced with "Sparky and Mikaela", which debuted on Xbox Live on December 31, 2008. In an April 2009 interview on The Jace Hall Show, Gunn described "Sparky and Mikaela" as being "about a human [and] racoon crime fighting team and they fight crime in both the forest world, among the furry animals, and in the human world". Gunn also has a short-form web series for Spike.com titled James Gunn's PG Porn.

In 2008, Gunn was a judge on the VH1 reality television show Scream Queens, where 10 unknown actresses compete for a role in the film Saw VI.

In 2009, Gunn announced he was going to write and direct Pets, a comedy about a man who is abducted by aliens who want to turn him into a household pet, with Ben Stiller, Stuart Cornfeld and Jeremy Kramer producing. However, by March 2009, Gunn announced, "Pets unfortunately, is done. I'm gone. I left the project for various reasons. I hope it sees the light of day somehow, but it won't be with me attached as director."

In 2010, Gunn released Super, a dark comedy and superhero satire starring Rainn Wilson and Elliot Page. He also directed a segment of the 2013 comedy anthology film Movie 43 (2013); the segment starred Elizabeth Banks and Josh Duhamel. The film was critically panned.

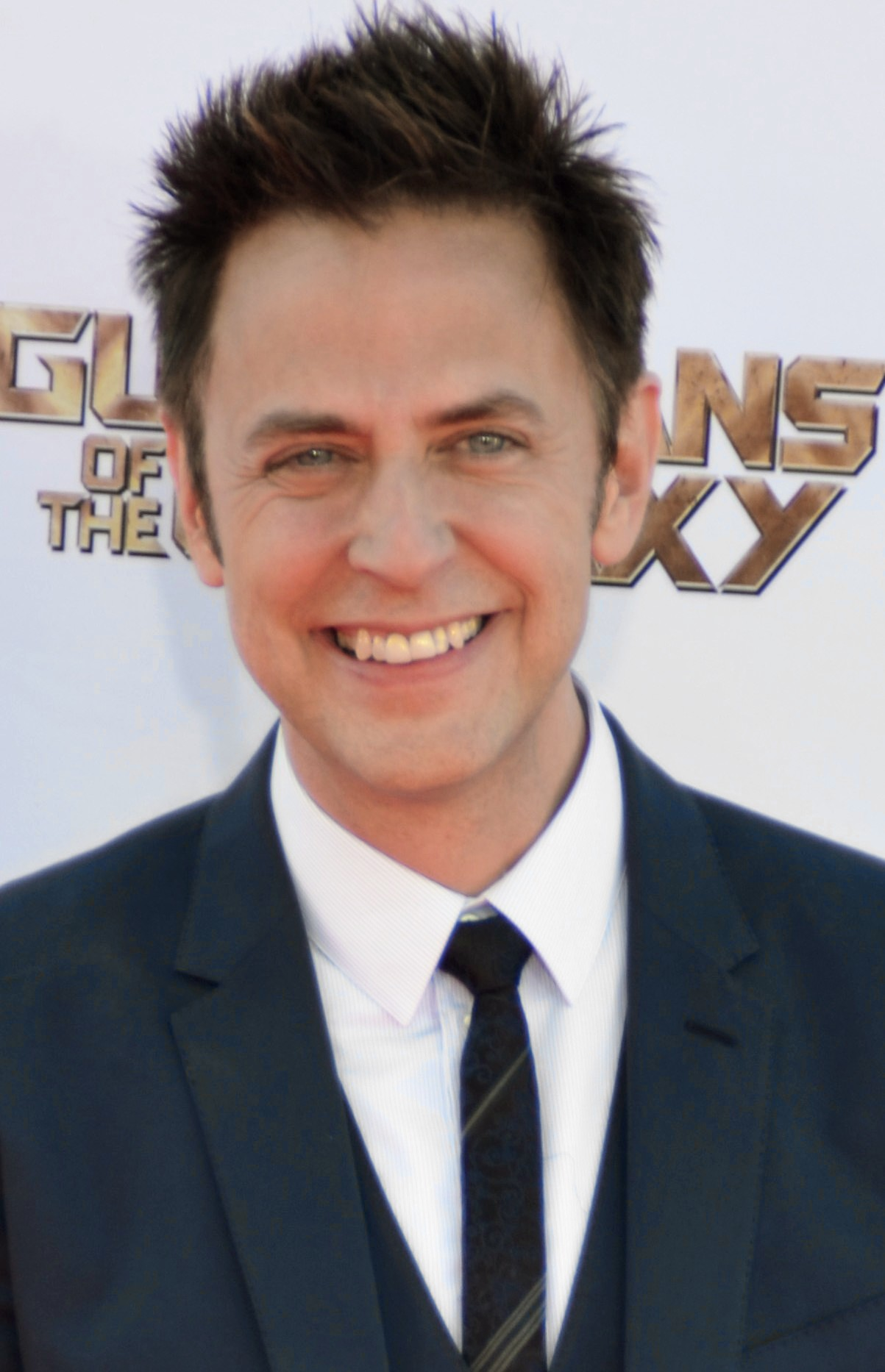
Gunn in 2014

Gunn co-wrote and directed the Marvel Studios adaptation of Guardians of the Galaxy, which was released on August 1, 2014. His brother, Sean, has a role in the film. Gunn has appeared as an actor, mostly in smaller roles or uncredited appearances in his own projects. After Dan Gilroy and Jack Black separately lamented the proliferation of superhero films, Gunn responded in a Facebook post, saying in part:

Popular fare in any medium has always been snubbed by the self-appointed elite. ... What bothers me slightly is that many people assume because you make big films that you put less love, care, and thought into them than people do who make independent films or who make what are considered more serious Hollywood films. ... If you think people who make superhero movies are dumb, come out and say we're dumb. But if you, as an independent filmmaker or a 'serious' filmmaker, think you put more love into your characters than the Russo Brothers do Captain America, or Joss Whedon does the Hulk, or I do a talking raccoon, you are simply mistaken.

Gunn wrote and produced the horror film The Belko Experiment, which was released in 2017. In 2016, he directed three Stan Lee cameo scenes in one day, for the film Doctor Strange and two unrevealed projects.

Gunn wrote and directed Guardians of the Galaxy Vol. 2 (2017). Gunn was slated to direct Guardians of the Galaxy Vol. 3 in July 2018, but before the project started, Disney severed ties with Gunn as the director amid controversy over off-color jokes he had tweeted. Gunn was rehired in March 2019 after a mass public appeal, many saying he was the reason of the previous movies' successes.

In October 2018, Gunn was hired to write a completely new script for the DC Extended Universe film The Suicide Squad, with the intention of also serving as director, after its original director Gavin O'Connor left due to scheduling issues. In January 2019, he was officially confirmed to direct The Suicide Squad. He also wrote, primarily directed, and produced the HBO Max spin-off show Peacemaker centered on The Suicide Squad character Peacemaker played by John Cena. Gunn also co-wrote and co-produced a live-action/animated film titled Coyote vs. Acme, based on the Looney Tunes character Wile E. Coyote, for Warner Animation Group.

=== Other media ===
Gunn wrote a novel in 2000, The Toy Collector, a story of a hospital orderly who steals drugs from the hospital which he sells to help keep his toy collection habit alive. In 1998, he and Troma's President Lloyd Kaufman co-wrote All I Need to Know About Filmmaking I Learned from The Toxic Avenger, about his experiences with Kaufman while working at Troma.

He wrote the story for Grasshopper Manufacture's video game Lollipop Chainsaw, working with game designer Suda 51.

=== Firing from Disney and reinstatement ===
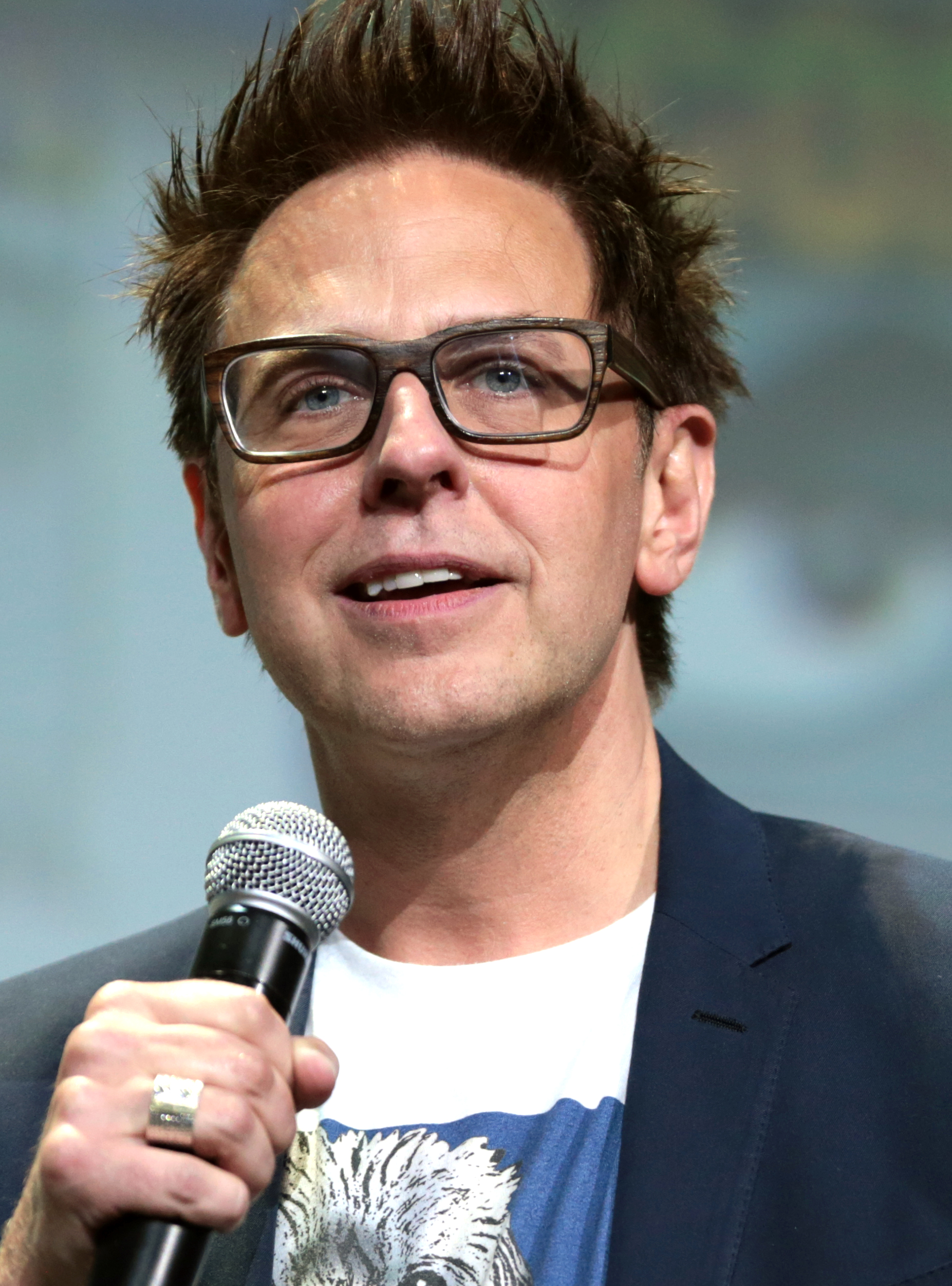
Gunn at the 2016 San Diego Comic-Con

In July 2018, amidst criticism of Gunn's past controversial jokes posted on social media between 2008 and 2012—topics included child sexual abuse, rape, and the Holocaust—Disney severed its ties with him as the director of the upcoming Guardians of the Galaxy Vol. 3 film.

Gunn responded, describing the jokes as "stupid, not at all funny, wildly insensitive, and certainly not provocative like I had hoped". He continued apologetically, "Even these many years later, I take full responsibility for the way I conducted myself then. All I can do now, beyond offering my sincere and heartfelt regret, is to be the best human being I can be: accepting, understanding, committed to equality, and far more thoughtful about my public statements and my obligations to our public discourse."

Walt Disney Studios's decision received criticism from many entertainers and journalists, including actors Dave Bautista, Selma Blair, Patton Oswalt, David Dastmalchian, Michael Ian Black, Mikaela Hoover, Mike Colter, Alex Winter, David Hasselhoff, directors Joe Carnahan and Fede Álvarez, comics artist Jim Starlin, musician Rhett Miller, comedian Jim Jefferies, journalist David A. French, and Troma Entertainment founder Lloyd Kaufman. (Note: Attributed to multiple references:) Bobcat Goldthwait asked Disney to remove his voice from an upcoming park attraction based on their film Hercules.

A number of media outlets criticized Disney's decision, including Collider, Cartoon Brew, The Daily Dot, The Independent, National Review, MovieWeb, and Vulture. An online petition urging Disney to re-hire Gunn received over 400,000 signatures. On July 30, Guardians of the Galaxy cast members Chris Pratt, Zoe Saldaña, Dave Bautista, Bradley Cooper, Vin Diesel, Sean Gunn, Karen Gillan, Pom Klementieff, and Michael Rooker released a joint statement expressing their support for Gunn, emphasizing that he had disavowed and apologized for the jokes years previously.

Because of the situation, Sony Pictures did not promote the horror film Brightburn, which Gunn had produced, at the 2018 San Diego Comic-Con, which took place in the days after Gunn's dismissal. However, when the first trailer for the film was released on December 8, Gunn's name was prominently featured, and the film opened in May 2019.

In March 2019, Gunn was reinstated by Disney as director of the film after meeting with Alan Horn, chairman of Walt Disney Studios. Gunn started production on Guardians of the Galaxy Vol. 3 in October 2021, after The Suicide Squad had been completed.

=== DC Studios ===
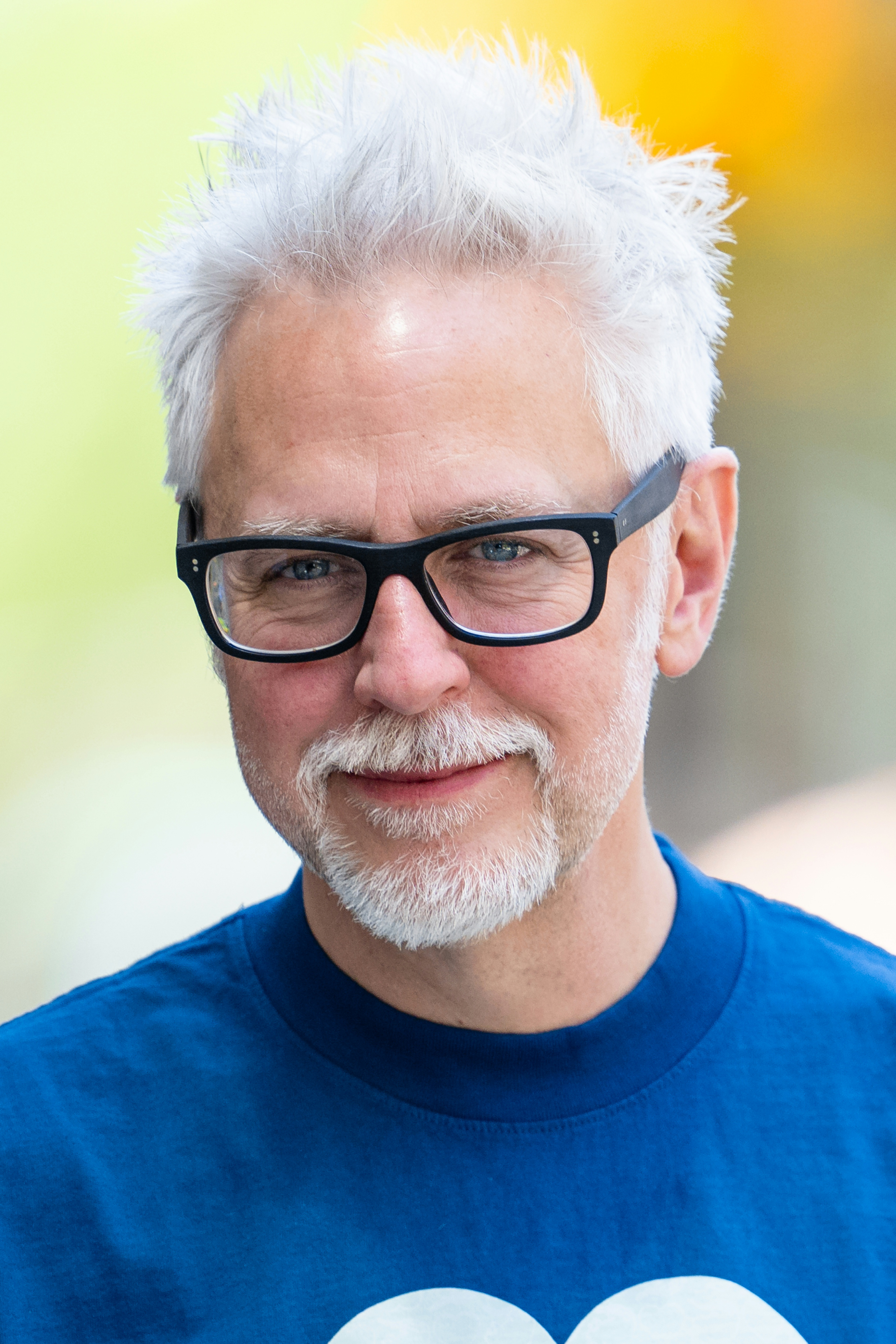
Gunn on the set of Superman in 2024

Gunn and frequent producing partner Peter Safran had advised David Zaslav, the CEO of Warner Bros. Discovery, during Zaslav's search for a new head of DC Films. The duo impressed Zaslav, who decided to appoint them as the co-chairpersons and CEOs of DC Films, rebranded as DC Studios. The two were given control over films, animation and television projects based on characters from DC Comics. Gunn was to oversee the creative aspects and exclusive to Warner Bros. Discovery during his tenure, except for his prior commitments to Disney. The two first worked together on the 2000 superhero comedy film The Specials written by Gunn with Safran as co-executive producer, with subsequent collaborations including Gunn's 2008 short films Sparky & Mikaela and Humanzee!, the television series James Gunn's PG Porn (2008–2009), The Belko Experiment (2016) and the DCEU film The Suicide Squad (2021). The two assumed their positions on November 1, 2022.

In December 2022, Gunn announced that he was writing a film about a young Superman during his early years in Metropolis, later revealed to be titled Superman and released in July 2025; in March 2023 it was confirmed Gunn would also direct the project. In January 2023, Gunn and Safran revealed their plans for future DCU films, with the first chapter being titled "Gods and Monsters". Gunn also wrote a seven-episode animated series titled Creature Commandos, based on the comic book team of the same name, and released ahead of Superman in December 2024, and also worked on the HBO Max series Waller, a spin-off of Peacemaker focusing on the character of Amanda Waller, with Christal Henry writing and Viola Davis reprising her role from previous DCEU projects. Gunn is also involved in multiple other DC projects, including producing Supergirl released on June 26, 2026.

Following the success of Superman, Gunn announced a follow-up film in September 2025, titled Man of Tomorrow, using new artwork from Jim Lee. The film wrapped filming in August 2026, and is set to be released in 2027, with David Corenswet and Nicholas Hoult reappearing as Superman and Lex Luthor. The second season of Peacemaker was also produced by the Gunn and Safran-led DC Studios. Most of the first season is canon to the DCU, but only the second season, written in 2023 and aired in August–October 2025, is part of the Gods and Monsters chapter.

Gunn and Safran were initially set to continue in their roles at DC Studios after Warner Bros. Discovery and Paramount Skydance were merged into Skydance in October 2026. However, in November 2026, Skydance hired former Marvel Studios executive Jeremy Latcham to replace the duo as their successor, effective December 1. Gunn described his tenure running DC as "trying" and stated that he had grown to "dislike the at-times corporate nature of the job". He added that he was relieved that he could now focus his full attention on writing and directing projects, and would continue working with DC on projects beyond Man of Tomorrow. The Hollywood Reporter and TheWrap attributed the ousting to tensions over power between Skydance CEO David Ellison's team and the Gunn–Safran duo, with Ellison reportedly unhappy with them reporting directly to him as opposed to Skydance Motion Picture Group co-chairs Dana Goldberg and Josh Greenstein, as well as the conglomerate's dissatisfaction with Superman and Supergirl's box-office performances and Ellison's desire to appeal to a more general audience over the focus on lesser-known characters that Gunn had been prioritizing. Ellison and his co-CEO Ynon Kreiz had personally delivered the news to Gunn and Safran, who were described as "blindsided", after more than a month of private deliberations. Matthew Belloni from Puck News reported that many of Gunn and Safran's future plans beyond Man of Tomorrow would be "dismantle[d]", with the franchise going "back into reboot mode".

== Political views ==
In December 2017, Gunn publicly shifted from his previous apolitical stance on social media to openly criticize the Donald Trump administration. In one of his tweets, he described the situation as a "national crisis" and compared the president's approach to facts and journalism to the tactics employed by Adolf Hitler and Vladimir Putin. In July 2018, after Mark Duplass posted and deleted a tweet endorsing conservative commentator Ben Shapiro, Gunn came in defense of him by referring to Shapiro as an "asshole" and stating that "There are a lot of traitors and racists in the country today. Perhaps save the outrage for them." This led to right-wing personality Mike Cernovich and conservative website The Daily Caller to highlight some of Gunn's past controversial tweets.

Some critics have interpreted the film Superman (2025) as an allegory for the Israeli–Palestinian conflict, particularly referencing the 2018–2019 Gaza border protests and the 2023 Gaza war. However, James Gunn stated that the script was written prior to the outbreak of the war and was not intended as an allegory. Filming began on February 29, 2024.

== Personal life ==
Gunn married actress Jenna Fischer on October 7, 2000. After seven years of marriage, Gunn and Fischer announced their separation in a joint statement on September 5, 2007, divorcing in 2008. The two remained friends. In 2010, Fischer persuaded Gunn to cast Rainn Wilson, her co-star on The Office, in Gunn's film Super.

Gunn has been in a relationship with actress Jennifer Holland since 2015. In February 2022, Holland and Gunn became engaged, and were married at the end of September 2022.

He has a dog named Ozu, adopted from a shelter in 2022. Gunn has regularly shared photos of the dog and promoted the hashtag #AdoptDontShop. For that reason as well as his CGI work on Guardians of the Galaxy Vol. 3, PETA declared Gunn to be their 2023 Person of the Year. Ozu served as the inspiration for the redesigned, CGI-animated Krypto the Superdog in Gunn's 2025 adaptation of Superman.

Gunn was raised in a Catholic family. He has mentioned how prayer continues to play an important role in his life; he has also said that he is, "in some ways, anti-religion".

== Filmography ==
=== Film ===
Year	Title	Director	Writer	Producer	Notes
1996	Tromeo and Juliet	Associate	Yes	No	Co-written with Lloyd Kaufman; Executive in charge of production
2000	The Specials	No	Yes	Associate	
2002	Scooby-Doo	No	Yes	No	Story co-written with Craig Titley
2004	Dawn of the Dead	No	Yes	No	
2004	Scooby-Doo 2: Monsters Unleashed	No	Yes	Co-producer	
2006	Slither	Yes	Yes	No	
2010	Super	Yes	Yes	No	
2014	Guardians of the Galaxy	Yes	Yes	No	Co-written with Nicole Perlman
2016	The Belko Experiment	No	Yes	Yes	
2017	Guardians of the Galaxy Vol. 2	Yes	Yes	No	
2021	The Suicide Squad	Yes	Yes	No	
2023	Guardians of the Galaxy Vol. 3	Yes	Yes	No	
2025	Superman	Yes	Yes	Yes	
2026	Coyote vs. Acme	No	Story	Yes	
2027	Man of Tomorrow †	Yes	Yes	Yes	Post-production

Producer only

Year	Title	Director
2019	Brightburn	David Yarovesky
2026	Supergirl	Craig Gillespie
2026	Clayface	James Watkins
2028	The Batman: Part II †	Matt Reeves

Executive producer

Year	Title	Notes
2004	LolliLove	Also uncredited writer
2018	Avengers: Infinity War	Also wrote additional dialogue
2019	Avengers: Endgame	

Other roles

Year	Title	Role
1999	Terror Firmer	Uncredited writer Based on the book All I Need to Know About Filmmaking I Learned from The Toxic Avenger by Gunn and Lloyd Kaufman
2001	Thirteen Ghosts	Uncredited additional writing
2013	Thor: The Dark World	Second unit Director: mid-credit sequence
2016	Doctor Strange	Uncredited director: Stan Lee's cameo scene
2017	Spider-Man: Homecoming	Uncredited director: Stan Lee's cameo scene
2017	Thor: Ragnarok	Uncredited director: Stan Lee's cameo scene

Short films

Year	Title	Director	Writer	Producer	Notes
1997	Hamster PSA	Yes	Yes	No	
2004	Tube	No	Yes	No	
2008	Sparky & Mikaela	Yes	Yes	Yes	Web short
2008	Humanzee!	Yes	Yes	Yes	Web short
2013	Beezel	Yes	Yes	No	Segment of Movie 43

Acting roles

Year	Title	Role	Notes
1996	Tromeo and Juliet	"Found a peanut" father	
2000	The Specials	Minute Man	
2000	Citizen Toxie: The Toxic Avenger IV	Doctor Flem Hocking	
2003	Doggie Tails, Vol. 1: Lucky's First Sleep-Over	Riley	Direct-to-video
2003	The Ghouls	Detective Cotton	
2003	Melvin Goes to Dinner	Scott	
2004	LolliLove	James	
2006	Slither	Hank	Uncredited
2008	Humanzee!	James	Web short
2010	Super	Demonswill	
2014	Guardians of the Galaxy	Maskless Sakaaran, Baby Groot	Also CGI actor in end-credits scene
2017	Guardians of the Galaxy Vol. 2	Baby Groot	
2023	Guardians of the Galaxy Vol. 3	Lambshank	Voice cameo

=== Television ===
Year	Title	Director	Writer	Executive producer	Creator	Notes
1997–2000	The Tromaville Café	Yes	Yes	No	Yes	
2008–2009	James Gunn's PG Porn	Yes	Yes	Yes	Yes	Web series
2022–2025	Peacemaker	Yes	Yes	Yes	Yes	Directed 8 episodes
2022–2023	I Am Groot	No	No	Season 1	No	Shorts series Special thanks; Season 2
2022	The Guardians of the Galaxy Holiday Special	Yes	Yes	Yes	Yes	Television special
2024	Beast Boy: Lone Wolf	No	No	Yes	No	Shorts series
2024	DC Metal Force	No	No	Yes	No	Web series
2024–present	Creature Commandos	No	Yes	Yes	Yes	
2025–present	Krypto Saves the Day!	No	No	Yes	No	Shorts series
2026	My Adventures with Superman	No	No	Yes	No	Season 3
2026	Lanterns	No	No	Yes	No	
2027	The People v. Gorilla Grodd	No	No	Yes	No	Post-production

Acting roles

Year	Title	Role
1997	Sgt. Kabukiman Public Service Announcement	Insane Masturbator
1997–2000	The Tromaville Café	Mike the Crazy Boom Guy
2008	Scream Queens	Himself
2008–2009	James Gunn's PG Porn	Various roles
2013	Holliston	John Anguish
2015	Con Man	Raaker 2.0
2022	Harley Quinn	Himself (voice)
2022	I Am Groot	Wrist Watch (voice)
2025	Rick and Morty	Himself (voice)

=== Video games ===
Year	Title	Role
2012	Lollipop Chainsaw	Writer
2013	LocoCycle	Actor: Big Arms Chairman

=== Theme parks ===
Year	Title	Director	Writer	Show scenes
2017	Guardians of the Galaxy – Mission: Breakout!	Yes	Yes	Yes
2022	Guardians of the Galaxy: Cosmic Rewind	Yes	Yes	Yes

== Frequent collaborators ==
Gunn is known for his recurring collaborations with certain actors.

Recurring actor collaborators
Work Actor	The Tromaville Café (1997–2000)	Slither (2006)	James Gunn's PG Porn (2008–2009)	Super (2010)	Movie 43 "Beezel" segment (2013)	Guardians of the Galaxy (2014)	Guardians of the Galaxy Vol. 2 (2017)	The Suicide Squad (2021)	Peacemaker (2022–2025)	The Guardians of the Galaxy Holiday Special (2022)	Guardians of the Galaxy Vol. 3 (2023)	Creature Commandos (2024–present)	Superman (2025)	Man of Tomorrow (2027)	Total No.
Steve Agee				Yes			Yes					Yes			5
Maria Bakalova										Yes					3
Dave Bautista						Yes				Yes					4
Stephen Blackehart	Yes		Yes			Yes							Yes		11
Linda Cardellini				Yes							Yes				3
John Cena								Yes					Yes		3
Bradley Cooper						Yes				Yes			Yes		5
Viola Davis								Yes				Yes			3
Vin Diesel						Yes				Yes					4
Nathan Fillion		Yes				Yes		Yes			Yes		Yes		9
Karen Gillan						Yes				Yes					4
Seth Green						Yes					Yes				3
Frank Grillo									Yes			Yes			4
Sean Gunn			Yes			Yes									10
Gregg Henry		Yes		Yes		Yes					Yes				6
Jennifer Holland								Yes			Yes		Yes		4
Mikaela Hoover			Yes			Yes		Yes			Yes		Yes		6
Nicholas Hoult									Yes				Yes		3
Lloyd Kaufman	Yes			Yes		Yes		Yes			Yes				6
Pom Klementieff							Yes			Yes			Yes		5
Isabela Merced									Yes				Yes		3
Chris Pratt						Yes				Yes					4
Michael Rooker		Yes		Yes		Yes									10
Michael Rosenbaum			Yes				Yes				Yes		Yes		4
Zoe Saldaña						Yes					Yes				3
Sylvester Stallone							Yes				Yes				3
Alan Tudyk			Yes									Yes			3
Rob Zombie		Yes		Yes			Yes								3

== Unrealized projects ==
- Gilligan's Island: In the late 1990s, Gunn and Charlie Kaufman attempted to make a film adaptation of the 1960s television series Gilligan's Island, but as a cannibal film. Although the project was supported by Warner Bros., the film was never made because Sherwood Schwartz, who created the show, disapproved.
- Silver Surfer: In 1999, an executive from 20th Century Fox offered to hire Gunn to write and direct a film about the Marvel Comics superhero Silver Surfer.
- Spy vs. Spy: Also in 1999, Gunn wrote an unproduced screenplay adaptation of Spy vs. Spy. According to Gunn, Jay Roach was to have directed and Nicolas Cage and Eddie Murphy were to have starred.
- Plastic Man: While much is not known about this project or how far it got, Gunn pitched a basic idea back in the early 2000s where Matthew Lillard would have starred as the titular, wisecracking hero.
- The Newlyweds: In a 2002 interview with IGN, Gunn revealed that one of his next projects was a script called The Newlyweds for Warner Bros., which ultimately was not produced.
- Pure stage musical: Gunn also revealed that he and Tromeo and Juliet composer Willie Wisely were working on a stage musical called Pure. Gunn described said project as "a love story revolving around a guy who kills and tortures people because he thinks it helps him write and draw better children's books."
- Scooby-Doo 3: Gunn was to have helmed Scooby-Doo 3, which would have been the third film of Scooby-Doo (2002). However, due to the critical and financial failure of Scooby-Doo 2: Monsters Unleashed (2004), Warner Bros. cancelled the project.
- Creature from the Black Lagoon remake: In 2004, Gunn pitched to Universal Pictures his screenplay that was intended to be a remake of the 1954 film Creature from the Black Lagoon, but the studio turned down the pitch.
- Untitled Satan film: While promoting his film Slither (2006), Gunn revealed to IGN that he was in the process of writing a "much darker" movie about Satan. "I feel good about it," he said of the project at the time. "I think it's something special. [Slither] is really a call back to the '80s films and I think what I'm doing now, it's kind of its own thing."
- Pets: In 2007, it was reported that Gunn was to write and direct a comedy film for New Regency titled Pets, with Ben Stiller serving as one of the producers. Gunn left the project due to creative differences.
- It's Alive remake: Larry Cohen said in a 2017 interview that Gunn had approached him for permission to make a remake of his 1974 film It's Alive. According to Cohen, Gunn "couldn't raise enough money to buy the rights. I'm sorry today I didn't give them to him."
- Starsky & Hutch TV continuation: On August 31, 2017, Gunn was set to direct and co-write a dramatic continuation of Starsky & Hutch with his brother Brian & cousin Mark Gunn as co-writers for Prime Video. On July 24, 2018, an Amazon Studios spokesperson revealed on Yahoo! Finance that the series was cancelled months before Gunn's firing from Guardians of the Galaxy Vol. 3.

== Awards and nominations ==
Year	Award	Category	Recipient(s)	Result	Ref.
2005	Bram Stoker Award	Best Screenplay	Dawn of the Dead	Nominated	
2006	Chainsaw Award	Highest Body Count	Slither	Won	
2007	Saturn Awards	The Filmmakers Showcase Award	Slither	Won	
2014	Golden Raspberry Award	Worst Screenplay (shared with co-writers)	Movie 43	Won	
2014	Golden Raspberry Award	Worst Director (shared with co-directors)	Movie 43	Won	
2015	Critics' Choice Awards	Best Action Film	Guardians of the Galaxy	Won	
2015	Grammy Awards	Best Compilation Soundtrack for Visual Media	Guardians of the Galaxy: Awesome Mix Vol. 1	Nominated	
2015	Hollywood Film Awards	Blockbuster of the Year	Guardians of the Galaxy	Won	
2015	Hugo Awards	Best Dramatic Presentation, Long Form	Guardians of the Galaxy	Won	
2015	Nebula Awards	Ray Bradbury Nebula Award for Outstanding Dramatic Presentation	Guardians of the Galaxy	Won	
2015	Saturn Awards	Best Comic-to-Film Motion Picture	Guardians of the Galaxy	Won	
2015	Saturn Awards	Best Director	Guardians of the Galaxy	Won	
2015	Saturn Awards	Best Writing	Guardians of the Galaxy	Nominated	
2015	Writers Guild of America Awards	Best Adapted Screenplay (shared with Nicole Perlman)	Guardians of the Galaxy	Nominated	
2018	Grammy Awards	Best Compilation Soundtrack for Visual Media	Guardians of the Galaxy Vol. 2: Awesome Mix Vol. 2	Nominated	
2018	Saturn Awards	Best Comic-to-Film Motion Picture	Guardians of the Galaxy Vol. 2	Nominated	
2022	Hollywood Critics Association TV Awards	Best Writing in a Streaming Series, Comedy	Peacemaker	Nominated	
2022	Georgia Film Critics Association Awards	Oglethorpe Award for Excellence in Georgia Cinema	The Suicide Squad	Nominated	
2022	Hollywood Critics Association	Best Action Film	The Suicide Squad	Nominated	
2022	Critics' Choice Super Awards	Best Superhero Movie	The Suicide Squad	Nominated	
2022	Saturn Awards	Best Superhero Film	The Suicide Squad	Nominated	
2023	Children's and Family Emmy Awards	Outstanding Fiction Special	The Guardians of the Galaxy Holiday Special	Won	
2023	Children's and Family Emmy Awards	Outstanding Directing for a Single Camera Program	The Guardians of the Galaxy Holiday Special	Nominated	
2023	Children's and Family Emmy Awards	Outstanding Short Form Program	I Am Groot	Won	
2024	Georgia Film Critics Association Awards	Oglethorpe Award for Excellence in Georgia Cinema	Guardians of the Galaxy Vol. 3	Nominated	
2024	Saturn Awards	Best Superhero Film	Guardians of the Galaxy Vol. 3	Won	
2024	Saturn Awards	Best Director	Guardians of the Galaxy Vol. 3	Nominated	

== Bibliography ==
Year	Title	Notes
1998	All I Need to Know About Filmmaking I Learned from The Toxic Avenger	with Lloyd Kaufman
2000	The Toy Collector	
2003	Make Your Own Damn Movie: Secrets of a Renegade Director	Introduction only
