= Joe Fleishaker =

American character actor

- Born: Joseph Isaac Fleishaker; November 25, 1953; Brooklyn, New York, U.S.
- Died: May 23, 2016 (aged 62); The Bronx, New York, U.S.
- Occupation: Actor

Joseph Isaac Fleishaker (November 25, 1953 – May 23, 2016) was an American character actor who is known for his appearances in low-budget cult and horror comedy movies, in particular those produced by New York-based independent film company Troma Entertainment, who have billed Fleishaker as "Troma's biggest action star", humorously alluding to his morbid obesity which surpassed five hundred pounds.

== Biography ==
Fleishaker was first cast in Troma's 1988 action-comedy Troma's War as an extra, where he played a member of a violent terrorist sect. Lloyd Kaufman, the film's director, was amused by Fleishaker's screen presence as an obese guerrilla soldier and ended up giving him more screen time throughout the film. Following Troma's War, Fleishaker struck up an ongoing partnership with Troma, having acted in every Kaufman-directed film from 1989 to 2006. These parts have ranged from background parts and short cameos to much larger supporting roles, such as The Toxic Avenger's sidekick Lardass in Citizen Toxie: The Toxic Avenger IV.

Outside of their films, Fleishaker became well-known to Troma fans for his numerous appearances in the company's many promotional videos and shorts, where he assumed the role of Troma co-president Michael Herz, who typically prefers to stay out of the public eye. Fleishaker's appearances as Herz were so frequent that many fans have continued to mistake him for the real Michael Herz.

In addition to his work with Troma, Fleishaker appeared at least twelve times as a bit player on Late Night/Late Show with David Letterman during the 1990s, acting in various comedy sketches.

In July 2012, Fleishaker was rushed to the hospital where he was diagnosed as suffering from kidney, heart and lung failure, weighing nearly 525 pounds (238 kg). He was later transferred to a physical rehabilitation center where he eventually lost 160 pounds though he still could not retain the ability to walk. On June 3, 2014, a GoFundMe account was opened in Fleishaker's name, aiming to raise $50,000 to help cover his ongoing medical costs and continued treatment. The fundraiser failed, raising only $961 since the fundraiser opened.

Fleishaker died on May 25, 2016, at Montefiore Medical Center in the Bronx of a possible heart attack.

== Filmography ==
- Mr. Melvin (2025) as Apocalypse Inc. Executive (Posthumous release)
- Lloyd-K (2022) (Posthumous release)
- 2 Girls, 1 Duck (2019) as Himself (Posthumous release)
- Return to Return to Nuke 'Em High AKA Volume 2 (2017) as Lauren 6 months later (Posthumous release)
- Sharknado 3 (2015) as movie patron who was decapitated by shark
- Trashtastic (2013) as Joe
- I Spill Your Guts (2012) as Dave the Landlord
- Troma Digital Studios: A Lesson in BrownRay (2010) as Michael Herz
- Poultry in Motion: Truth is Stranger Than Chicken (2008) as Himself
- Poultrygeist: Night of the Chicken Dead (2006) as Jared (credited as Mega Herz)
- Make Your Own Damn Movie! (2005) as Himself
- Tales from the Crapper (2004) as Michael Herz/500 Pound Candygramm
- UnConventional (2004) as Himself
- Parts of the Family (2003) as Fat Guy Watching Television (uncredited)
- Zombiegeddon (2003) as Caller #1 (voice only)
- Apocalypse Soon: The Making of 'Citizen Toxie' (2002) as Himself
- Captain Bill and the Rockin' Buccaneers (2001) as Mr. McDoohan
- Farts of Darkness: The Making of Terror Firmer (2001) as Himself
- Citizen Toxie: The Toxic Avenger IV (2000) as Chester/Lardass
- Terror Firmer (1999) as Jacob Gelman
- Tromeo and Juliet (1996) as 1-900-HOT-HUNK
- The Troma System (1993) as Himself
- Sgt. Kabukiman N.Y.P.D. (1991) as Josephs
- The Toxic Avenger Part III: The Last Temptation of Toxie (1989) as Apocalypse Inc. Executive
- The Toxic Avenger Part II (1989) as Apocalypse Inc. Executive
- Troma's War (1988) as Specially Trained Terrorist

== TV shows ==
- Troma's Edge TV (2000) as Michael Herz/Lord Fartacus
- Late Night/Late Show with David Letterman - Himself/Various characters
- The Tromaville Café (1997) as Michael Herz/God
- Up All Night (1994) as Troma Actor Whose Arm Is Ripped Off
- Beyond Vaudeville (1989-1992) as Himself - Guest
