= Dorm of the Dead =

- Directed by: Donald Farmer
- Written by: Donald Farmer
- Produced by: Jackie Napoli
- Starring: Jackey Hall; Andrea Brooke Ownbey; Tiffany Shepis; Ciara Richards; Adrianna Eder
- Cinematography: Donald Farmer; Chris Watson
- Edited by: Allan McCall
- Distributed by: Under the Bed Films
- Release date: September 18, 2007
- Running time: 75 minutes
- Country: United States
- Language: English

Dorm of the Dead is a 2007 American horror film directed and written by Donald Farmer. It stars Jackey Hall, Ciara Richards and Adrianna Eder as college students who must survive a zombie attack.

== Plot ==
A professor returns to Arkham University with the blood of a zombie. As he tests it on the students, Amy accidentally initiates a zombie attack. During the confusion, bully Clare targets goths Sarah and Allison for involuntary conversion into zombies.

== Cast ==
- Jackey Hall as Clare
- Andrea Brooke Ownbey as Julie
- Ciara Richards as Sarah
- Adrianna Eder as Allison
- Tiffany Shepis as Amy
- Dukey Flyswatter as Alf

== Release ==
Dorm of the Dead was released on home video September 18, 2007.

== Reception ==
Melissa Bostaph of Dread Central rated the film 1.5/5 stars and called it a "bullshit film" that had no effort put into it". Brandon Ciampaglia of IGN rated the film 0/10 stars and wrote: "It is in our professional opinion that this catastrophe never be watched by anyone – ever". Nick Lyons of DVD Talk rated the film 0.5/5 and called it an insult to the word film. Mac McEntire of DVD Verdict described the film as "amateur hour" and technically incompetent. Peter Dendle called it a "boring, amateurish production".
