= The Toy Collector =

2000 novel by James Gunn

- Author: James Gunn
- Language: English
- Genre: Fiction
- Published: 2000
- Publisher: Bloomsbury Publishing
- Pages: 276
- ISBN: 1-58234-081-1
- OCLC: 43940209

The Toy Collector is a novel written by James Gunn, published by Bloomsbury Publishing in 2000. It is the story of a hospital orderly who steals drugs from the hospital which he sells to help keep his toy collection habit alive. Although the work is fictional, the name of the protagonist is James Gunn.

== Content ==
The novel flashes back and forth between the character Gunn's drug-addled, sexually abusive adult life, and his life among his childhood friends. Furthermore, we see the lives of Gunn's childhood toys—from Rom, Spaceknight to the Fisher-Price Little People, who seem to have lives and thoughts of their own outside Gunn's world.

== Reception ==
A positive review in The Austin Chronicle states that The Toy Collector "satirizes both Seventies melodrama and Nineties cynicism as Gunn barrels through life looking for beauty and love. But every page in this novel has something to laugh at and something sad to remember, and it's better than anything you'll see on TV."

== Background ==
Although Gunn started as a novelist after he began working in the film industry, he became much more successful as a screenwriter with films such as Dawn of the Dead (2004), and as writer-director, in particular with Slither and the Guardians of the Galaxy films.

== Editions ==
- ISBN 1-58234-081-1 (hardcover, 2000)
- ISBN 1-58234-149-4 (paperback, 2001)
- ISBN 3-442-45221-X (German edition, 2004)
