= Michael Herz =

Michael Herz may refer to:

- Michael Herz (businessman) (born 1943), owner of Tchibo Holding
- Michael Herz (producer), filmmaker and co-founder of Troma Entertainment
