= Pat Swinney Kaufman =

American state government official

Patricia Swinney Kaufman (born 1948) is the executive director of the New York State Governor's Office for Motion Picture and Television Development and the deputy commissioner of Empire State Development. Kaufman is the former president of the Association of Film Commissioners International, where she still serves on the board of directors. She is the secretary for the Hamptons International Film Festival and has also acted in some films directed by her husband, Lloyd Kaufman, the co-founder of Troma Entertainment.

== Personal life ==
Kaufman was born in North Carolina. She graduated from Sweet Briar College in Virginia in 1970 and earned a Masters from Columbia University in New York City. She and her husband, who live in New York City, have three daughters, Charlotte, Lily Hayes and Lisbeth.

== Professional life ==
As executive director of the New York State Governor’s Office for Motion Picture and Television Development and as deputy commissioner of Empire State Development, Kaufman is responsible for making available and marketing the State of New York as a location for film, television and commercial production. To foster the growth of these industries throughout the state, Kaufman’s office facilitates production by identifying and clearing locations and providing a statewide network of federal, state and local contacts. In addition, the office monitors legislative, regulatory and tax initiatives that will affect the industry. Kaufman also oversees the new Empire State Film Production Credit incentive program, which is designed to offer incentives to qualified productions choosing to film in New York. The program was signed into law in August 2004 and has already had a significant impact on film and television production in New York.
