= Citizen Toxie: The Toxic Avenger IV =

2000 American superhero comedy film by Lloyd Kaufman

- Theatrical release poster by Joe Paradise
- Directed by: Lloyd Kaufman
- Written by: Lloyd Kaufman; Michael Herz; Patrick Cassidy; Trent Haaga; Gabriel Friedman
- Produced by: Lloyd Kaufman; Michael Herz
- Starring: David Mattey; Clyde Lewis; Heidi Sjursen; Paul Kyrmse; Joe Fleishaker; Debbie Rochon; Ron Jeremy
- Cinematography: Brendan Flynt
- Edited by: Gabriel Friedman
- Music by: Wes Nagy
- Production company: Troma Entertainment
- Distributed by: Troma Entertainment
- Release dates: October 8, 2000 (Sitges); May 15, 2001 (Cannes); November 2, 2001 (New York)
- Running time: 109 minutes
- Country: United States
- Language: English
- Budget: $500,000

Citizen Toxie: The Toxic Avenger IV is a 2000 American superhero comedy film directed by Lloyd Kaufman and written by Trent Haaga. It is the fourth installment of The Toxic Avenger franchise. Despite being the third sequel to The Toxic Avenger, Stan Lee's opening narration claims that Citizen Toxie is, in fact, the official sequel to the first film, disacknowledging the events of the first two sequels.

== Plot ==
The Diaper Mafia (criminals dressed as infants) break into the Tromaville School for the Very Special and commit a mass shooting. The Toxic Avenger ("Toxie" for short) shows up, under the guise of a bikini news model, alongside his morbidly obese sidekick Lardass. They kill the gang members in grotesque fashion with Toxie eviscerating the leader, Tex. Before he dies, Tex reveals an explosive device has been implanted in his body. Toxie runs home to impregnate his wife, Sarah, leaving Lardass to disarm the bomb by smearing peanut butter over it, eating it and draining it in his stomach through flatulence. Upon returning, Toxie rescues the pregnant teacher and two students, Tito and Sweetie Honey. The urgency of the situation forces them to leave Lardass behind, which results in his demise when a Diaper Mafia member and a student, in a moment of intimacy, unknowingly trigger the explosive by lighting a cigarette.

The explosion transports Toxie and the students to Amortville, a mirror version of Tromaville in an alternate universe. The police shoot at Toxie. Evil Kabukiman (an evil version of Sgt. Kabukiman) helps him escape the police. Amortville's version of Toxie, The Noxious Offender (Noxie), appears in Tromaville and starts murdering the citizens. Both supers are confused by the surroundings. Noxie finds the Nazi Sgt. Kazinski to be an ally. Mayor Goldberg introduces four new superheroes to Tromaville, including a washed up Sgt. Kabukiman. Searching for answers, Toxie comes across a man named Pompey who, after being dragged along the back of a truck by rednecks, is decapitated but is a still-living head. He also finds Amortville's version of Lardass (named Chester) who is a scientist broke on the streets. Chester's former wife, Claire, is Noxie's lover. Toxie offers to bring her back to Chester but gets into a fight with Evil Kabukiman. Noxie becomes Mayor of Tromaville after killing Mayor Goldberg, reverting the place into Amortville, and impregnates Sarah. Toxie wanders into the factory of an evilized superhero, Mad Cowboy, where he finds Tito, Pompey and Sweetie Honey held captive. Toxie throws Mad Cowboy into a meat grinder and the three escape.

The Tromaville Superheroes attempt to take down Noxie and Kazinski, but are all killed, except for Sgt. Kabukiman who drunkenly wanders into Toxie's home and impregnates a sleeping Sarah. Claire finds Chester and the two become a couple again. Sarah visits her gynecologist, who tells her that she is pregnant with two babies from two different fathers. Toxie and Chester find the way back to Tromaville: clicking red shoes together and saying "There's no place like Tromaville." Tito stays behind and dedicates himself to making Amortville safe with Pompey as his sidekick. Toxie and Sweetie Honey arrive in Tromaville to discover Sarah is in labour. At the hospital, Toxie brutally slays the Nazi soldiers and Kazinski. He finds Sarah's room with Noxie inside and the two fight alongside their babies within Sarah's uterus. Toxie kills Noxie by ripping his organs out. Melvin (the Amortville version of Melvin Ferd, Toxie's true identity) emerges from Noxie's stomach and attacks Toxie, who throws him out the window into a barrel of toxic waste. He runs away in flames laughing.

Surrounded by witnesses of the Tromaville School for the Very Special, who express their gratitude to Toxie for his heroism, Sarah gives birth to her and Toxie's child as well as Sgt. Kabukiman's. An enraged Toxie chases Sgt. Kabukiman as everyone else laughs.

== Cast ==
- David Mattey as The Toxic Avenger/Melvin Ferd, a janitor that got mutated into a deformed superhero.
  - David Mattey also performs The Noxious Offender, an evil version of The Toxic Avenger from an alternate reality.
  - David Mattey also portrays a customer of Chester's.
  - Clyde Lewis as The Voice of The Toxic Avenger and The Noxious Offender
    - Mark Torgl as Melvin "Evil Melvin" and Melvin Ferd III
- Heidi Sjursen as Sarah/Claire, the blind girlfriend of The Toxic Avenger.
- Joe Fleishaker as Chester/Lardass, the obese sidekick of The Toxic Avenger.
- Paul Kyrmse as Sergeant Kabukiman, a superhero who has become a pathetic has-been.
  - Paul Kyrmse also portrays Evil Kabukiman, a more-threatening version of Sgt. Kabukiman from an alternate reality.
- Ron Jeremy as Mayor Goldberg, the Mayor of Tromaville.
- Dan Snow as Sergeant Kazinski
- Michael Budinger as Tito
- Lisa Terezakis as "Sweetie Honey"
- Barry Brisco as Pompey
- Trent Haaga as Tex Diaper, a member of the Diaper Mafia.
- Caleb Emerson as Rex Diaper, a member of the Diaper Mafia.
- Yaniv Sharon as Lex Diaper, a member of the Diaper Mafia.
- Stan Lee as The Narrator
- James Gunn as Dr. Flem Hocking
- Hank the Angry Drunken Dwarf as God
- Corey Feldman as "Kinky" Finkelstein, Sarah's gynecologist.
- Debbie Rochon as Ms. Weiner
- Jason Sklar as Jason Diaz
- Randy Sklar as Jason Gonzales
- Al Goldstein as The Mayor Goldberg's press secretary
- Tom Fulp as New Wave Painter
- Kevin Eastman as Biker, who gets killed by Noxie.
- Julie Strain as Tromadu, model who gets killed by Noxie.
- Lemmy as Lemmy
  - Lemmy also portrays the alternate reality Lemmy
- Eli Roth as Frightened Tromaville Citizen
- Bill Weeden as Abortion Doctor
- Will Keenan as Man, Getting Hit by Car on the News.
- Mitch Collins as Racist Truck Driver, The Original Toxic Avenger.
- Rick Collins as Police Chief, the unnamed chief of police. (N.B. Collins is the only actor except for Dan Snow that has appeared in all 4 Toxic Avenger films.)
- Gil Brenton as Warren. (N.B. Brenton reprises his role from Class of Nuke 'Em High (1986).)
- Charlotte Haug as Mrs. Ferd, Toxie's mom.
- Tromelissa Saytar as Lesbian Art Student
- Bella Compagna as Diaper Mafia Temptress
- Terri Firmer as Wet Lesbian
  - Terri Firmer also portrays a Topless Deaf Translator
- Stacy Burke as Additional Contest Winner
- Tiffany Shepis as Beautiful Interpretative Dancer
- Celeste Octavia as Glamorous Gyno-American
  - Celeste Octavia also portrays a Naked Nurse
- Devin DeVasquez as Glamorous Gyno-American
- Neriah Davis as Glamorous Gyno-American
- Masuimi Max as Glamorous Gyno-American
- Lenora Claire as Herself
- Hugh Hefner as the President of the United States
- Lloyd Kaufman also shows up in the end of the film during a PSA about traveling accidentally to other dimensions.

== Release ==
=== Home media ===
The film was released on DVD on March 18, 2003. The DVD includes deleted scenes; three commentary tracks from the director, actors and crew; “around the world” footage; and a more than two-hour documentary dubbed as a real look at filmmaking.

== Reception ==
=== Critical response ===
Unlike The Toxic Avenger's first two sequels, The Toxic Avenger Part II and The Toxic Avenger Part III: The Last Temptation of Toxie, which both received negative reviews, Citizen Toxie: The Toxic Avenger IV received mixed reviews and as of 2024 has a 60% "fresh" rating on Rotten Tomatoes. Stephen Holden of The New York Times opined, "If the take-no-prisoners humor of Citizen Toxie is very funny, the movie's relentless comic excess is ultimately a little exhausting." Reviewing the 2015 Blu-ray release, the website Den of the Geek found that "It's a real shame, then, that the ridiculously enjoyable silliness turns nasty for Citizen Toxie, representing the studio's more recent trend towards plain horribleness, irritatingly pointless celebrity cameos (here, we get Corey Feldman, Lemmy from Motorhead and porn-star Ron Jeremy) and over-the-top (even by Troma standards) bad acting."

== Future ==
Shortly after the release of the fourth entry, director Lloyd Kaufman announced a fifth entry titled Toxic Twins: The Toxic Avenger V, which would revolve around Toxie and Sarah's twins. In 2010, a press release announced that Collyn McCoy would serve as the screenwriter. Kaufman initiated promotional filming for the movie in 2013 and 2016; however, official production had not yet commenced. It wasn't until March 2018 that Kaufman declared, in an interview with SFX Magazine, that a script had been finalized and cited it as being “the best one yet." Despite this, the production faced delays attributed to Kaufman's involvement on his latest film, #ShakespearesShitstorm, impacting both the progress and financial support for the Toxic Avenger sequel. As of 2025, Troma has not begun official production on the sequel, and it is unknown if the project will still happen with the release of the Toxic Avenger reboot in August 2025.
