= Tromeo and Juliet =

Tromeo & Juliet
- Theatrical release poster
- Directed by: Lloyd Kaufman
- Screenplay by: James Gunn; Lloyd Kaufman
- Based on: Romeo and Juliet by William Shakespeare
- Produced by: Michael Herz; Lloyd Kaufman
- Starring: Jane Jensen; Will Keenan; Valentine Miele; Maximillian Shaun; Steve Gibbons; Sean Gunn; Debbie Rochon; Lemmy; Stephen Blackehart; Tiffany Shepis
- Cinematography: Brendan Flynt
- Edited by: Frank Reynolds
- Music by: Willie Wisely
- Production company: Troma Entertainment
- Distributed by: Troma Entertainment
- Release dates: May 13, 1996 (Cannes); February 28, 1997 (United States)
- Running time: 107 minutes; 137 minutes (Unrated Directors Cut)
- Country: United States
- Language: English
- Budget: $350,000

Tromeo and Juliet is a 1996 American independent transgressive romantic black comedy film and a loose adaptation of the play Romeo and Juliet by William Shakespeare from Troma Entertainment. The film was directed by Lloyd Kaufman from a screenplay he co-wrote with James Gunn, who also served as associate director.

The film is a loose adaptation of the play, as it includes the extreme amounts of sexuality and violence characteristic of Troma, as well as a revised ending. The film's title is a blend of "Troma" and "Romeo and Juliet".

== Plot ==
Set in modern-day Manhattan, the film begins with the narrator (Lemmy of Motörhead) introducing two families: the rich Capulets and the poor Ques.

At the center of these families are Tromeo Que and Juliet Capulet. Tromeo lives in squalor with his poor, alcoholic father Monty and works at a tattoo parlor with his cousin Benny and friend Murray. Juliet is sequestered in her family's mansion, watched over by her abusive father Cappy, passive mother Ingrid, and overprotective cousin Tyrone, all the while being sexually satisfied by family servant Ness (Debbie Rochon).

Both Tromeo and Juliet are trapped in cases of unrequited love: Tromeo lusts for the big-bosomed, promiscuous Rosie; Juliet is subjected into marrying wealthy meat tycoon London Arbuckle by her father who hopes of completing his mafia family tree.

In the meantime, an intense duel between Murray and Sammy Capulet catches the attention of Detective Ernie Scalus, who gathers the heads of the two families together and declares that they will be held personally accountable for any further breaches of the peace. Almost immediately afterward, Monty and Cappy start threatening each other with weapons. Sammy, on the other hand, gets caught in the window of Monty's speeding car, where he is thrown head-first into a fire hydrant and gradually dies.

On the insistence of Murray and Benny, Tromeo attends the Capulets' masquerade ball in the hopes of meeting Rosie, only to find another man performing cunnilingus on her. Tromeo staggers around the party in disillusion until he locks eyes with Juliet. The two instantly fall for each other and share a dance until an angry Tyrone chases him out of the house.

Tromeo and Juliet continue to be enamored by one another from afar. Cappy, disgusted at his daughter's active libido, forcefully imprisons her in a plastic cage as punishment. Eventually, Tromeo sneaks into the house of Capulet and the two meet once again. After proclaiming their love for each other both verbally and physically, they agree to be married. Juliet breaks her engagement with Arbuckle and, with the help of Father Lawrence, the two are married in secrecy the next day.

Tyrone, upon discovering Juliet's secret affair, gathers his gang together to find Tromeo in his family's parlor and accuse him of bridenapping. Now a kinsman to the Capulets, Tromeo reassures Tyrone that Juliet doesn't want Arbuckle as her husband anymore hence announcing a truce to both families. However, Tyrone refuses to believe him. Eventually, Murray stands by Tromeo's side to try and defend his honor but is fatally wounded by Tyrone's club as an example for anyone, besides Arbuckle, who dares to seduce Juliet. Tromeo, enraged by his friend's death, pursues Tyrone and slays him (through a series of car crashes that dismember him). As punishment for the murder of Tyrone in addition to ruining Arbuckle's wedding with Juliet, Detective Scalus evicts the Ques from Manhattan to ensure that his sacrifice won't be in vain on behalf of the Capulet family while Cappy savagely beats Juliet into reconciling with Arbuckle after learning from the late Tyrone that Juliet has already become Tromeo's wife, threatening to disown her if she doesn't. With the help of Cappy, Arbuckle accepts her re-proposal and the wedding date is set.

Eventually, Juliet goes into hiding with Father Lawrence, whom she recruited along with Tromeo, who was recently evicted from his home by Scalus along with the rest of his family. Together, the three devise a plan to clear the Que family name and end the Capulet/Que feud for good, enlisting the help of Fu Chang, the apothecary, who sells Juliet a special potion which will aid her predicament.

On the day of her wedding, Juliet drinks the apothecary's potion, transforming her into a hideous cow monster (complete with a three-foot penis). The mere sight of her causes Arbuckle to leap out of Juliet's window in fright, committing suicide in the process. Enraged over the loss of his would-be son-in-law and meat inheritance, Cappy deems Juliet a disgrace to the Capulet family and sentences her to death, but Tromeo arrives just in time to chase Cappy out of her room before he can rape her to death and bring Juliet's appearance back to normal by a single kiss. Meanwhile, Cappy was forced to retreat into the parlor to get his crossbow, and then returns to Juliet's room, ready to execute the newlyweds. Eventually, Juliet performs one last act of defiance against her father by electrocuting him to death with a computer monitor. After the Capulets' residence is successfully overtaken, Detective Scalus becomes impressed by Tromeo and Juliet's teamwork of ending Cappy's criminal empire, pardoning Tromeo of murder while ordering for Cappy's corpse to be transported by an ambulance to the morgue for cremation.

With Cappy's criminal empire finally defeated, Tromeo and Juliet embrace victoriously until they are stopped short by Ingrid and Monty, who reveals to them the real reason behind the Capulet/Que feud: Long ago, Cappy and Monty were the owners of the successful Silky Films pornographic production company. Ingrid, married to Monty at the time, struck up an affair with Cappy, eventually birthing a son which Monty raised as his own. Faced with a divorce from Ingrid and the threat of having his son taken away from him, Monty was forced to sign over all the rights of Silky Films to the Capulets in exchange for his son. After the initial shock at the revelation that they are siblings, Tromeo and Juliet brush it off as they are determined not to let their whole ordeal be for naught; they passionately embrace and drive off into the sunset.

The film picks up six years later in Tromaville, New Jersey, where Tromeo and Juliet, now married, have become suburban yuppies with a house and (birth defected/deformed) children of their own.

The film ends with the narrator's brief poem for the lovers: "And all of our hearts free to let all things base go/As taught by Juliet and her Tromeo". A brief shot of William Shakespeare laughing uproariously is shown before the end credits.

== Cast ==
Actor	Character in Tromeo and Juliet	Character in Romeo and Juliet
Will Keenan	Tromeo Que	Romeo Montague
Jane Jensen	Juliet Capulet	Juliet Capulet
Maximillian Shaun	Cappy Capulet	Lord Capulet
Valentine Miele	Murray Martini	Mercutio
Earl McKoy	Monty Que	Lord Montague
Stephen Blackehart	Benny Que	Benvolio
Patrick Connor	Tyrone Capulet	Tybalt
Tamara Craig Thomas	Georgie Capulet	Gregory
Wendy Adams	Ingrid Capulet	Lady Capulet
Steve Gibbons	London Arbuckle	Count Paris
Debbie Rochon	Ness	Nurse
Tiffany Shepis	Peter	Capulet Servant
Flip Brown	Father Lawrence	Friar Lawrence
Gene Terinoni	Detective Ernie Scalus	Prince Escalus
Jacqueline Tavarez	Rosie	Rosaline
Garon Peterson	Fu Chang	The Apothecary
Sean Gunn	Sammy Capulet	Sampson
Joe Fleishaker	1-900-HOT-HUNK	—N/a
James Gunn	The "Found a Peanut" Father	—N/a
Brian Fox	Bill Shakespeare	—N/a
Lemmy Kilmister	The Narrator	—N/a
Charis Michelsen	Person of the Female Persuasion with Very Good Hearing	—N/a

Lloyd Kaufman, Merle Allin, and Ami James have non-speaking cameos in the film. A scene featuring Ron Jeremy as a homeless man was filmed but ultimately deleted from the final cut of the movie.

== Production ==
The first draft of Tromeo & Juliet surfaced in 1992, written by Kaufman and Troma employees Andy Deemer and Phil Rivo, written entirely in Shakespearean verse and supposedly featuring The Toxic Avenger as a side character. The feedback from other Troma employees and Michael Herz was unanimously negative, so the idea was scrapped.

In 1995, another shot was taken at the concept, this time by newbie screenwriter James Gunn. Gunn completely rewrote the script, again in Shakespearean verse, making it darker and far more obscene; the original version had Juliet as a stripper and Tromeo as a crack dealer. Another revision, with additional material by Kaufman, was crafted into what the film eventually became: the verse was trimmed down and more comical elements were added.

Tromeo and Juliet was shot in the summer of 1995 for $350,000, one of the most expensive films in Troma history.

Director Lloyd Kaufman said that, in preparation for their sex scene, he gave Will Keenan and Jane Jensen time during pre-production to block the scene themselves. "I wanted them to develop a very intense relationship and indeed they did. But they decided that they shouldn't actually have off-screen intercourse until after the movie. I don't remember whether they ever did but this gave their on-screen scenes together terrific sexual tension and was something a sex-crazed pervert like me would never have thought of in a zillion years," Kaufman said.

== Release ==
Tromeo & Juliet had its world premiere at the Cannes Film Festival on May 13, 1996. In addition, it played at the Mar del Plata Film Festival and the Italian Fantafestival, where it won the award for Best Film of 1997.

Tromeo screened at New York arthouse theaters on February 14, 1997. It expanded to select theaters in the United States on February 28, 1997.

== Reception ==
In The New York Times, Stephen Holden said "Tromeo & Juliet is to Hollywood B-movies what Mad magazine is to comic books. Although many times more explicit than what Hollywood is permitted to show, there is something goofily exhilarating in the spectacle of all the staple images of teen-age sex and slasher movies transformed into farce." In a review for Entertainment Weekly, J.R. Taylor gave the film a grade of B and wrote, "While this comedy about star-crossed idiots (Jane Jensen and Will Keenan) has all the kinky sex and ultraviolence expected of the Troma studio, which built its reputation on chimichangas like The Toxic Avenger, Shakespeare's dewy tragedy still glistens amid the deep-fried glop. Which is all the more incredible considering that Tromeo & Juliet changes the Bard's ending and throws out most of his words. Some stories just adapt more readily than others."

Daniel Rosenthal described Tromeo and Juliet as "the nadir of screen Shakespeare...[it] takes every major character and incident from Romeo and Juliet and systematically drains them of humanity in a tedious, appallingly acted feast of mutilation and softcore sex." Tony Howard summarized it as a film "in which Juliet and the Nurse have lesbian sex, Romeo masturbates, various body parts are removed, the feud is between rival porn czars and incest rules".

== Home media ==
Tromeo & Juliet was released on DVD as a 10th Anniversary Collector’s Addition on August 22, 2006.

== Attempted follow-ups ==
After the success of Tromeo, Troma had plans to develop a spiritual sequel entitled Schlock and Schlockability (a play on Sense and Sensibility), in which Jane Austen is reincarnated as a well-endowed female who takes revenge on all of the Hollywood movie producers who have bastardized her novels. At one point, Troma announced that the film would head into production, but since then, there are no plans to follow up on the film.

== Soundtrack ==
Tromeo and Juliet: The Original Soundtrack

Soundtrack album by Various artists
- Released: May 6, 1997
- Label: Oglio Records

Tromeo and Juliet is also notable for its soundtrack, which is composed of alternative rock, pop punk and heavy metal music. The CD soundtrack was released on Oglio Records on May 5, 1997, and included the following tracks:

1. "Tromeo and Juliet Theme" by Willie Wisely
2. "Sacrifice" by Motörhead
3. "Pope on a Rope" by The Meatmen
4. "Sunday" by The Icons
5. "The Capulet Song (My Name Is Capulet)" by Stephen Blackehart & Valentine Miele
6. "Drink That Whiskey" by The Wesley Willis Fiasco
7. "Hyper Enough" by Superchunk
8. "La Migra (Cruza La Frontera II)" by Brujeria
9. "Gizzards, Scrapple and Tripe" by The New Duncan Imperials
10. "Mr. Superlove" by Ass Ponys
11. "Math" by Supernova
12. "Romeo" by Sublime
13. "TV Show Theme" by Willie Wisely
14. "Monster Island" by Booterella w/ Jane Jensen
15. "Yes, We'll Gather at the River" by Willie Wisely, Sean Gunn, Valentine Miele, Patrick Connor
16. "Alleged" by Unsane
