= Terror Firmer =

1999 American comedy horror film

- Theatrical release poster
- Directed by: Lloyd Kaufman
- Written by: Douglas Buck; Patrick Cassidy; Lloyd Kaufman
- Produced by: Michael Herz; Lloyd Kaufman
- Starring: Will Keenan; Alyce LaTourelle; Lloyd Kaufman; Trent Haaga; Debbie Rochon; Ron Jeremy
- Cinematography: Brendan Flynt
- Edited by: Gabriel Friedman
- Music by: Nobuhiko Morino
- Production company: Troma Entertainment
- Distributed by: Troma Entertainment
- Release date: October 29, 1998
- Running time: 98 minutes; 114 minutes (Extended cut); 123 minutes (Even More Extended cut)
- Country: United States
- Language: English
- Budget: $500,000

Terror Firmer is a 1998 American comedy horror film directed by Lloyd Kaufman, written by Douglas Buck, Patrick Cassidy, and Kaufman, and starring Will Keenan, Alyce LaTourelle, and Kaufman. The film was produced by the Troma Entertainment company, known for distributing campy exploitation films.

The film features several direct references to the previous Troma films, such as The Toxic Avenger, and includes famous Troma props, like the 'Penis Monster' (referred to in the film as "Thor, the God of Love") and a severed leg. It was loosely based, in that respect, on Kaufman and James Gunn's book All I Need to Know About Filmmaking I Learned from The Toxic Avenger.

== Plot ==
The film is the story of a New York low-budget film crew, led by their insane and egotistical blind film director, Larry Benjamin, who is trying to create a work of art. In addition to the typical trials and travails of a Troma set, the crew is preyed upon by a sexually conflicted, bomb-toting serial killer.

Among the large and poorly-paid film crew, the movie centers mostly on production assistant Jennifer. She struggles to do her job while deciding between the two men in her life; the strait-laced boom operator Casey, and the rebellious special effects operator Jerry. The love triangle intensifies as the dead bodies mount with increasing brutality. At the climax, the entire film crew bands together (both physically and sexually) against the mortal threat in their midst.

== Cast ==
- Will Keenan as Casey
- Alyce LaTourelle as Jennifer
- Lloyd Kaufman as Larry Benjamin
- Trent Haaga as Jerry
- Debbie Rochon as Christine
- Ron Jeremy as Casey's Father
- Charlotte Kaufman as Audrey Benjamin
- Sheri Wenden as The Mysterious Woman
- Darko Malesh as Nikolai
- Yaniv Sharon as Yeager, The P.A.
- Gary Hrbek as Toddster
- Greg 'G-Spot' Siebel as Ward
- Mario Díaz as D.J.
- Joe Fleishaker as Jacob Gelman
- Mo Fischer as Andy
- Reverend Jen Miller as Tina, The Script Girl
- Trace Burroughs as Edgar Allan
- Sean Pierce as "Moose"
- Barry Brisco as Stephen
- Kerri Kenney as Woman With Eyeball In Her Cleavage
- Theo Kogan as Theodora
- Eli Roth as a Shocked Onlooker
- Lemmy Kilmister as Himself
- Joe Lynch as Clothespin Boy
- Edouard Baer and Joseph Malerba as French Cool Cats
- Trey Parker and Matt Stone as The Hermaphrodites

== Production ==
Terror Firmer is the first Troma release to be edited digitally on Avid.

The 'Morton Springer Show' sequence was based on the experience Lloyd Kaufman had on the Morton Downey Jr. Show.

The end credits states, "A VERY SPECIAL THANK YOU TO: The New York City Police Department, for their unstinting cooperation and invaluable help throughout every part of this production." The documentary The Making of Terror Firmer shows the police clashing with the production on several instances (one of which involved the police revoking the crew's filming permit).

The movie includes songs from notable punk bands, including NOFX (Stranger than Fishin'), the Vandals (Idea for a Movie), Bouncing Souls (Argyle), Blood for Blood (My Time is Yet to Come), Anti-Flag (Someone's Gonna Die Tonight), and The Melvins (Horn Bearer). A soundtrack for the movie was released by Go Kart records in October 2000.

== Alternate versions ==
- The 2-Disc Special Edition gives the viewer a choice to watch the Director's Unrated Cut or to watch the Director's Unrated Cut with even more deleted scenes put back into the film. This makes the film's running time 123 minutes.
- The 98-minute release R-rated version features several boxes that contain the words "CENSORED", covering various body parts (whether nude or dismembered). Additionally, for the heavier cut scenes, the movie freezes and a window appears on the screen with Kaufman explaining or comically re-enacting what was supposed to go on in the scene. The voices of characters uttering profanity at some moments are replaced by an obviously mismatched voice that says the accepted version of the word. Finally, some body parts are replaced by images of animals (e.g. a pussy cat).
- The unrated director's cut runs 114 minutes. The heavily edited R-rated version runs 98 min.
