= List of Troma Team Video titles =

Troma Entertainment was founded out of the rubble of Lloyd Kaufman's Armor Films in 1974 as a production company. In 1995, Kaufman and vice president Michael Herz formed Troma Team Video who would handle all of their distribution instead of going through a third party. Since 1995, they have been releasing Troma titles (including titles the company has bought since being formed and a large collection of older classics with The Roan Group) on DVD and virally. They started re-releasing their films on Blu-ray in 2010 and in the 2020s, they started their own streaming service.

This is a list of films currently being distributed by Troma Team Video.

== 1920s ==
- The Vagabond Lover

== 1930s ==
- White Zombie
- Revolt of the Zombies
- The Gorilla
- The Milky Way
- Billy the Kid Returns
- Days of Jesse James
- Zorro's Fighting Legion
- Zorro Rides Again
- Tarzan's Revenge
- The New Adventures of Tarzan
- The Legion of Missing Men
- The Broken Melody
- His Private Secretary
- The Sins of the Children
- The Mysterious Mr. Wong
- Illegal
- Hell Town
- The Fighting Westerner
- The Last Frontier
- West of the Divide
- The Secret of Dr. Kildare
- Of Human Bondage
- They Made Me a Criminal
- Sins of the Children
- Blue Steel
- The Lucky Texan
- Where Trails Divide
- Behind Office Doors
- Kept Husbands
- Lonely Wives
- Millie
- Paradise Canyon
- Silver Horde
- Undersea Kingdom
- Tarzan the Fearless
- Way Down South

== 1940s ==
- Angel and the Badman
- The Devil Bat
- The Ape
- Dick Tracy, Detective
- Dick Tracy Meets Gruesome
- Dick Tracy vs. Cueball
- Dick Tracy's Dilemma
- Africa Screams
- The Corpse Vanishes
- Flash Gordon Conquers the Universe
- Lady of Burlesque
- The Monster Maker
- Underground
- Invisible Ghost
- Bowery at Midnight
- Zorro's Black Whip
- Bluebeard
- Captain Kidd
- Roll on Texas Moon
- That Uncertain Feeling
- Angel on My Shoulder
- Dead Men Walk
- King of the Cowboys
- British Intelligence
- Adventure in Iraq
- Lady Gangster
- Black Dragons
- Chamber of Horrors
- The Black Raven
- Helldorado
- Enemy of Women
- Apache Rose
- Kid Dynamite
- Hands Across the Border
- The Perils of Paulie

== 1950s ==
- Plan 9 from Outer Space
- Bride of the Monster
- Glen or Glenda
- The Bat
- Patterns
- Radar Men from the Moon
- Suddenly
- Quicksand
- D.O.A.
- The Hitch-Hiker
- Indestructible Man
- Carnival Story
- Cause For Alarm!
- Jack and the Beanstalk
- The Painted Hills
- Three Guys Named Mike
- Albert Schweitzer
- Last Time I Saw Paris

== 1960s ==
- Scream, Baby, Scream
- The Amazing Transparent Man
- Madigan's Millions
- The Wedding Party
- Seven Vengeful Women
- The Fat Spy
- The Girl Who Returned
- Horror Hotel
- Bang Bang Kid
- Pyro - The Phantom of the Ferris Wheel

== 1970s ==
- Blood Sucking Freaks
- Pigs
- Demented Death Farm Massacre
- Sizzle Beach, U.S.A.
- Cry Uncle!
- Squeeze Play!
- Video Vixens
- The Butchers
- East End Hustle
- Preacherman
- Hot Summer in Barefoot County
- The Battle of Love's Return
- Sugar Cookies
- The G.I. Executioner
- The Capture of Bigfoot
- Big Gus, What's the Fuss?
- Croaked: Frog Monster from Hell
- Garden of the Dead
- Crazed
- Covert Action
- Supercock
- Cycle Psycho
- Dynamite Chicken
- Acting Out
- No Substitute for Victory
- Seduction of a Nerd

== 1980s ==
=== 1980 ===
- Mother's Day
- The Children
- Beyond Evil
- The Exterminator
- Escape From Hell
- Nightmare Never Ends

=== 1981 ===
- Waitress!
- Graduation Day
- Croaked: Frog Monster from Hell

=== 1982 ===
- The Last Horror Film
- Nightbeast
- When Nature Calls
- Stuck on You!
- Curse of the Cannibal Confederates
- Ferocious Female Freedom Fighters
- Ferocious Female Freedom Fighters 2
- Dreams Come True

=== 1983 ===
- The First Turn-On!
- Monster in the Closet
- Frightmare
- Endgame

=== 1984 ===
- The Toxic Avenger
- Combat Shock
- New Gladiators
- Zombie Island Massacre
- Ellie
- Hell Behind Bars

=== 1985 ===
- Igor and the Lunatics
- Star Worms II: Attack of the Pleasure Pods
- The Stabilizer
- I Was a Teenage TV Terrorist
- Reel Horror

=== 1986 ===
- Class of Nuke 'Em High
- Girls School Screamers
- Nightmare Weekend
- Hollywood Zap!
- Shadows Run Black
- Play Dead
- The Visitants
- Silent But Deadly
- Mayhem

=== 1987 ===
- Redneck Zombies
- Surf Nazis Must Die
- Blood Hook
- Lust for Freedom
- Skeleton Coast
- Story of a Junkie
- Mommy's Epitaph
- The Newlydeads
- Plutonium Baby
- Deadly Daphne's Revenge
- Mission: Terminate
- Dance or Die
- I Married A Vampire
- L.A. Crackdown

=== 1988 ===
- Troma's War
- Rabid Grannies
- Maniac Cop
- Red Scorpion
- Frostbiter: Wrath of the Wendigo
- Witchcraft
- Death by Dialogue
- Dr. Hackenstein
- Contra Conspiracy
- The Glass Jungle
- Merchants of Death
- Death to the Pee Wee Squad
- Ragin' Cajun
- Mirror of Death
- The Killing Game
- Hollow Gate
- Heat Street

=== 1989 ===
- The Toxic Avenger Part II
- The Toxic Avenger Part III: The Last Temptation of Toxie
- Fortress of Amerikkka
- Killer Crocodile
- Beware! Children at Play
- They Call Me Macho Woman!
- Stuff Stephanie in the Incinerator
- Dead Dudes in the House
- Tale of Two Sisters
- Blades
- Video Demons Do Psychotown
- Dialing For Dingbats
- Princess Warrior

== 1990s ==
=== 1990 ===
- Sgt. Kabukiman N.Y.P.D.
- Frankenhooker
- Def by Temptation
- Luther the Geek
- Maniac Nurses Find Ecstasy
- Getting Lucky
- Witchcraft II: The Temptress
- A Nymphoid Barbarian in Dinosaur Hell
- There's Nothing Out There
- Invasion of the Space Preachers
- Fertilize the Blaspheming Bombshell
- Twisted Justice
- Nerds of a Feather
- Payback
- Time Barbarians
- No Way Back
- Electra Love 2000
- Haunting Fear
- Emperor of The Bronx

=== 1991 ===
- Class of Nuke 'Em High 2: Subhumanoid Meltdown
- Toxic Crusaders
- McBain
- Witchcraft III: The Kiss of Death
- Wizards of the Demon Sword
- Vegas in Space
- Body Parts
- Cybernator
- Where Evil Lives
- Horror of the Humongous Hungry Hungan
- Comrades in Arms
- Tomcat Angels
- Prime Target
- Cause of Death

=== 1992 ===
- Witchcraft 4: The Virgin Heart
- State of Mind
- Virgin Beasts
- Fraternity Demon
- Crystal Force
- Media Madman

=== 1993 ===
- Cannibal! The Musical
- Teenage Catgirls in Heat
- Witchcraft V: Dance with the Devil
- TC 2000
- The Troma System
- Space Zombie Bingo
- The Last Hit
- Eye of the Stranger
- Tuesday Never Comes
- Death Dancers
- Radiation March
- Time Wars
- Street Beat
- The Ruining
- Final Showdown

=== 1994 ===
- Class of Nuke 'Em High 3: The Good, the Bad and the Subhumanoid
- Witchcraft VI: The Devil's Mistress
- Dragon Fury
- Beg!
- Eye Of The Serpent

=== 1995 ===
- Decampitated
- Witchcraft VII: Judgement Hour
- Blondes Have More Guns
- Digital Prophet
- Jurassic Women

=== 1996 ===
- Tromeo & Juliet
- Witchcraft VIII: Salem's Ghost
- Macabre Pair of Shorts
- Vendetta
- Dragon Fury 2
- Tight Spot!

=== 1997 ===
- Bugged!
- Dog Years
- Witchcraft IX: Bitter Flesh
- Absolute Force
- Hellblock 13
- Troma's Basement
- Buttcrack!
- Blood Sisters of Lesbian Sin
- Hamster PSA
- Masturbation PSA
- Kick of Death

=== 1998 ===
- Terror Firmer
- The Chosen One: Legend of the Raven
- Jefftowne
- Viewer Discretion Advised
- Sucker: The Vampire
- Pep Squad
- Baconhead
- Fag Hag
- Harry Knuckles
- Tainted
- Finding Kevin Costner at Cannes

=== 1999 ===
- Fatty Drives the Bus
- Sergio Lapel's Drawing Blood
- The Hall Monitor
- Back Road Diner
- Viral Assassins
- Nightfall
- Alien Blood
- Bleeding Iowa
- Please Kill Mr Kinski
- The Island of Hell

== 2000s ==
=== 2000 ===
- Citizen Toxie: The Toxic Avenger IV
- Troma's Edge TV
- The Rowdy Girls
- Superstarlet A.D.
- Dumpster Baby
- Eve's Beach Fantasy
- Medley

=== 2001 ===
- Farts of Darkness: The Making of Terror Firmer
- Outlaw Prophet
- Rockabilly Vampire: Burnin' Love
- Suicide
- Chain of Souls
- Smile Now Cry Later

=== 2002 ===
- All the Love You Cannes!
- Apocalypse Soon: The Making of Citizen Toxie

=== 2003 ===
- Tales from the Crapper
- Punk Rock Holocaust
- Parts of the Family
- Zombiegeddon
- Doggie Tails
- The Wounded
- Bazaar Bizarre
- Jack Movez
- The Soft Hustle
- Monsturd
- Wiseguys vs. Zombies
- A Matter of Principal
- An Untouchable Life
- Shades of Noir

=== 2004 ===
- LolliLove
- Offensive Behaviour
- The Thick Brown Line
- PDA Massacre
- Nosferatu: The Friendly Vampire
- Teenage Bikini Vampire
- Kung Fu Kitties
- Meat for Satan's Icebox
- Three Women

=== 2005 ===
- Make Your Own Damn Movie!
- Coons! Night of the Bandits of the Night
- Slaughter Party
- Pot Zombies
- Space Daze
- Belcebú: Diablos Lesbos
- Eyes of the Chameleon
- Devoured: The Legend of Alfred Packer
- Pee Stains and Other Disasters
- Knight of the Living Dead
- Rock 'n Roll Space Patrol: Action is Go

=== 2006 ===
- Poultrygeist: Night of the Chicken Dead
- Electric Apricot: Quest for Festeroo
- Yeti: A Love Story
- Meat Weed Madness
- Loony In The Woods
- Debbie Rochon Confidential - My Years In Tromaville Exposed
- The Evolved
- Bloodspit
- I Need to Lose Ten Pounds
- The Demons Among Us
- Bloodz Vs. Wolvez
- Clownie & The Satanic Cult
- Big Foot

=== 2007 ===
- Klown Kamp Massacre
- Crazy Animal
- Blood, Boobs & Beast
- Meat Weed America
- Ghosts Of The Heartland
- A Nocturne: Night of the Vampire
- Big Ballin'
- The Terror Factor
- The Period
- Arizona Seaside
- The Devil's Muse
- Killing Twice
- Troubled

=== 2008 ===
- Cars 3
- Poultry in Motion: Truth is Stranger than Chicken
- Shameless, Tasteless
- The Seduction of Dr. Fugazzi
- Dead Eyes Open
- Vanity Insanity
- RetarDEAD

=== 2009 ===
- Jessicka Rabid
- Direct Your Own Damn Movie!
- Zombie Werewolves Attack!
- The Killer Bra
- The Ghost of Marquis de Sade
- Penisella
- The Chainsaw Sally Show
- Heavy Mental: A Rock-n-Roll Blood Bath
- Killer Yacht Party
- Grim
- Purge
- Dark Nature
- Fable: Teeth of Beasts
- Red Queen
- The Killer Robots and the Battle for the Cosmic Potato
- CockHammer
- Tuck Bushman and the legend of Piddledown Dale
- Incest Death Squad
- Yesterday
- Papa Wrestling

== 2010s ==
=== 2010 ===
- The Taint
- Spaceman
- Voodoo Cowboys
- Nixon and Hogan Smoke Christmas
- Incest Death Squad 2
- Open 24/7
- Mad Cow
- Slimed

=== 2011 ===
- Father's Day
- Produce Your Own Damn Movie!
- Psycho Sleepover
- Teenape vs. the Nazi Monster Apocalypse
- Mr. Bricks: A Heavy Metal Murder Musical
- The Secret of the Magic Mushrooms
- L.A. Maniac
- Kill
- Climb It, Tarzan!
- Hemo

=== 2012 ===
- Attack of the Tromaggot
- Doomsday County
- Pot Zombies 2: More Pot, Less Plot
- Frankensluts
- Iconoclast
- Hollywood a GoGo
- 8 Reels of Sewage
- The Cinema Snob Movie
- Sunny Acres Farms
- Fist of Jesus
- Blood Orgy At Beaver Lake

=== 2013 ===
- Return to Nuke 'Em High: Volume 1
- The Thingy: Confessions of a Teenage Placenta
- Daisy Derkins, Dogsitter of the Damned
- Pro-Wrestlers VS Zombies
- Junk Bonds: The Return Of Junkbucket
- Cichonga
- Theatre Of The Dead
- Die Die Delta Pi
- Extreme Jukebox

=== 2014 ===
- Mutant Blast
- A Halloween Carol
- Revenge of the Spaceman
- Banana Motherfucker
- 30 Coins Of The Cursed Crucifix
- Honky Holocaust
- The Deviants
- Club Lingerie
- Deadly Punkettes
- After School Massacre
- Micky's Summer Resort
- Fear Town USA
- Megamuerte
- Porking Mandy
- 30 Girls 30 Days
- Hole in the Wall
- The Light of Day

=== 2015 ===
- Kabukiman's Cocktail Corner
- Dolphinman vs Turkeyman
- Sick Sock Monsters From Outer Space
- Take Back The Knife
- Haebangchon
- The Arc of Methul
- The Slashening
- My Bloody Banjo
- Attack of the Killer Chickens: The Movie
- Greasy
- Don't Touch That Dial
- Chopping Block
- Memento Mortis
- Raise Your Kids on Seltzer
- Franklin: A Symphony of Pain
- Dark Prism
- Maggie's Problem

=== 2016 ===
- Return to Return to Nuke 'Em High AKA Volume 2
- B.C. Butcher
- Dolphinman Battles The Sex Lobsters
- Hectic Knife
- Grindsploitation 2: The Lost Reels
- Maniac Tales
- Spidarlings
- The Killer Robots! Crash and Burn
- DickRipper
- My Uncle John Is a Zombie!
- Grindsploitation
- Last Day Of School
- Dolly Deadly
- Bird Cage
- Amityville: Vanishing Point
- Moonshine Meat Market Mayhem
- Dead Inside
- Essex Spacebin

=== 2017 ===
- Grindsploitation 3: Video Nasty
- From Festival To Fascist
- The Middle Finger
- Officer Pigsley
- Malvineitor
- Ghost Hazers
- Dawn and the Dead
- Toxic Tutu
- Toxic Schlock
- Monserrate
- The Nobodies
- ReAgitator: Revenge of the Parody
- Jesus, Bro!
- Rednecks
- Rose and Viktor: No Mercy
- Gutboy: A Badtime Story

=== 2018 ===
- Kabukiman's Cocktail Corner: Loaded in Las Vegas
- Hot Lead, Hot Fury
- Conspiracy X
- 911: Officer Down
- An Hour to Kill
- Grindsploitation 4: Meltsploitation
- Schlocksploitation: Grindsploitation 5
- Grindsploitation 666
- Clownsploitation
- Grindsploitation 8: Drive-In Grindhouse
- Agalmatophilia
- The Good Exorcist
- Honor Killing
- O' Bloody Night
- Victor Goodview

=== 2019 ===
- Return of the Slasher Nurse
- Neon City Files
- The Black Spot
- Sex Terrorists on Wheels
- Girls Just Wanna Have Blood
- Night of the Witch
- Christmas Chaos
- Bone Barrel
- Men at War
- Budfoot
- Another Cinema Snob Movie
- The Disposal of Dead Ned
- The Hart-Break Killer
- Cannibal Hookers
- Gyrus

== 2020s ==
=== 2020 ===
- Shakespeare's Shitstorm
- Friend of the World
- Search Out
- Homicide Never Dies
- Left Hook
- When Women Rule The World
- Henrietta and Her Dismal Display of Affection
- Evul Twinz
- Drown The Clown
- Human Hibachi
- A Little More Flesh
- Crucify
- Stab! Kill! Die!
- Horror Nights
- Zombie Wars

=== 2021 ===
- Show Me the Ghost
- Private Blue
- Fountaine and the Vengeful Nun Who Wouldn't Die
- Dasiy Derkins and the Dinosaur Apocalypse
- Grindsploitation 9: Revenge of the Schlock
- Divide & Conquer
- Reunion Of Champions
- Gruesom Twosome
- Daytrip Massacre
- Holy Shit Man!
- Get Lost in the Outdoors: The Quest for the Junior Ranger Badge!
- The Central Authority
- Slashening: The Final Beginning
- Quartz Vein
- The Lake Parasite
- Like a Dirty French Novel
- Danny Hall the Killer Crab Elf
- Fowl Uprising
- Inner Earth Attacks: A Love Story
- Dead Vision
- Part of the Family
- Shroomed

=== 2022 ===
- Eating Miss Campbell
- The Secret of Cuck Island
- Grindsploitation 10: Milkin' It
- Jungle Girl And The Tomb Of Terror!
- Crime Traveler
- Scarlett Cross: Agents of D.E.A.T.H.
- Boxanne
- Diamond Heat
- Roller Junkies
- Psychic Vampire
- Blood Fear
- Human Hibachi 2
- The 12 Slays Of Christmas
- Blood Panther: The Way of the Cannibal
- Worst Laid Plans
- Different Love

=== 2023 ===
- Robotica Destructiva
- Kill Dolly Kill
- Fish Piss
- Chicken Dinner Restaurant

=== 2024 ===
- An End In The Night
- Fear Of The Light

=== 2025 ===
- Occupy Cannes

=== 2026 ===
- Poultrygeist 2: Dawn of the Chicken Dead
- Hellmare

== Troma Blu-Ray ==
Movies that have been released by Troma on Blu-Ray

- Sugar Cookies (1973)
- Bloodsucking Freaks (1976)
- Mother's Day (1980)
- Graduation Day (1981)
- The Last Horror Film (1982)
- Frightmare (1983)
- The Toxic Avenger (1984)
- Class of Nuke 'Em High (1986)
- Rabid Grannies (1988)
- Troma's War (1988)
- Toxic Avenger Part II (1989)
- Toxic Avenger Part III: The Last Temptation of Toxie (1989)
- Def by Temptation (1990)
- Sgt. Kabukiman N.Y.P.D. (1990)
- Frankenhooker (1990)
- Cannibal! The Musical (1993)
- Tromeo & Juliet (1996)
- Citizen Toxie: The Toxic Avenger Part IV (2000)
- Poultrygeist: Night of the Chicken Dead (2006)
- Dark Nature (2009)
- The Taint (2010)
- Father's Day (2011)
- Return to Nuke 'Em High Volume 1 (2013)
- Extreme Jukebox (2015)
- Theatre of the Deranged II (2015)
- Spidarlings (2016)
- Rednecks (2017)

== Troma DVD ==
Movies that have been released by Troma on DVD

- The Wedding Party (1964)
- Madigan's Millions (1966)
- Hi, Mom! (1968)
- Sugar Cookies (1973)
- Foreplay! (1975)
- Video Vixens (1975)
- Blood Sucking Freaks (1976)
- Project: Kill (1976)
- Squeeze Play! (1979)
- Christmas Evil (1980)
- Waitress! (1981)
- The Last Horror Film (1982)
- Monster in the Closet (1983)
- Frightmare (1983)
- The Toxic Avenger (1984)
- Combat Shock (1984)
- New Gladiators (1984)
- Class of Nuke 'Em High (1986)
- The Stabilizer (1986)
- Surf Nazis Must Die (1987)
- Redneck Zombies (1987)
- Newlydeads (1988)
- Toxic Avenger Part 2 (1989)
- Toxic Avenger 3: The Last Temptation of Toxie (1989)
- Beware! Children At Play (1989)
- Chopper Chicks in Zombietown (1989)
- A Nymphoid Barbarian in Dinosaur Hell (1990)
- Def By Temptation (1990)
- Class of Nuke 'Em High 2: Subhumanoid Meltdown (1991)
- Killer Nerd (1991)
- Bride of Killer Nerd (1992)
- Cannibal! The Musical (1993)
- Class of Nuke 'Em High 3: The Good, The Bad and the Subhumanoid (1994)
- Jurassic Women (1994)
- Tromeo and Juliet (1996)
- Terror Firmer (1998)
- Crazy Animal (2007)

== Troma VHS ==
Movies that have been released by Troma on VHS

- The Wedding Party (1964)
- Satan's Sadists (1969)
- Demented Death Farm Massacre (1971)
- Angels' Wild Women (1972)
- Sugar Cookies (1973)
- Centerfold Girls (1974)
- I Spit On Your Corpse (1974)
- Video Vixens (1975)
- Black Fist (1975)
- Foreplay! (1975)
- Blood Sucking Freaks (1976)
- Project: Kill (1976)
- Christmas Evil (1980)
- Escape From Hell (1980)
- Mother's Day (1980)
- Fist of Fear, Touch of Death (1981)
- Waitress! (1981)
- The Last Horror Film (1982)
- Monster in the Closet (1983)
- The Toxic Avenger (1984)
- New Gladiators (1984)
- Zombie Island Massacre (1984)
- Splatter University (1984)
- Lust For Freedom (1985)
- Igor and the Lunatics (1985)
- Class of Nuke 'Em High (1986)
- Fat Guy Goes Nutzoid (1986)
- The Stabilizer (1986)
- Redneck Zombies (1987)
- Surf Nazis Must Die (1987)
- Blood Hook (1987)
- Hangmen (1987)
- Dance or Die (1987)
- Newlydeads (1988)
- Evil Clutch (1988)
- My Neighbor Totoro (1988)
- Troma's War (1988)
- Rabid Grannies (1988)
- Fortress of Amerikkka (1988)
- Toxic Avenger Part 2 (1989)
- Chopper Chicks in Zombietown (1989)
- Beware! Children At Play (1989)
- Invasion of the Space Preachers (1990)
- Frankenhooker (1990)
- A Nymphoid Barbarian in Dinosaur Hell (1990)
- Def By Temptation (1990)
- Class of Nuke 'Em High 2: Subhumanoid Meltdown (1991)
- Killer Nerd (1991)
- Bride of Killer Nerd (1992)
- Cannibal! The Musical (1993)
- Pterodactyl Woman from Beverly Hills (1994)
- Class of Nuke 'Em High 3: The Good, The Bad and the Subhumanoid (1994)
- Tromeo and Juliet (1996)
- Terror Firmer (1998)
- Chosen One: Legend of the Raven (1998)

== See also ==
- Troma Entertainment
- List of Troma films
- List of horror films
- List of fantasy films
- Lists of science fiction films
