= List of Troma films =

This is a list of films released by Troma Entertainment

For a complete list of films currently being distributed by Troma, click on List of Troma Team Video titles

Movie Title	Cinema Release	VHS Release	DVD Release	Blu-Ray Release	on Streaming
Sugar Cookies (1973)	Nationwide screenings	Troma Team Video	Troma DVD	Troma Entertainment, Vinegar Syndrome	Troma NOW
The Hanging Woman (1973)		Troma Team Video	Troma Retro		
The Centerfold Girls (1974)		Troma Team Video			
Video Vixens (1975)	Global screenings	Vestron Video, RCA/Columbia Pictures Home Video, Troma Team Video	Troma DVD		Troma NOW
Fore Play (1975)	Nationwide screenings	Vestron Video, Troma Team Video	Troma DVD		Troma NOW
Blood Sucking Freaks (1976)	Global screenings	Vestron Video, Troma Team Video	Troma DVD	Troma Entertainment, 88 Films, Vinegar Syndrome	Troma NOW
Mad Dog Morgan (1976)	Global screenings	Troma Team Video	Troma DVD, Tromasterpiece Collection	Indicator	Troma NOW, Amazon Prime Video
East End Hustle (1976)	Global screenings	Troma Team Video	Troma DVD	Canadian International Pictures	Troma NOW, Amazon Prime Video
Squeeze Play! (1978)	Nationwide screenings	Palace	Troma DVD, Troma Retro		Troma NOW
Delirium (1979)		Academy Entertainment			Troma NOW
Mother's Day (1980)	Global screenings	Media Home Entertainment, Troma Team Video, Anchor Bay	Troma DVD, Troma Retro, Anchor Bay	Vinegar Syndrome, Anchor Bay	Troma NOW
Waitress! (1981)	Global screenings	Troma Team Video	Troma DVD, Troma Retro	Troma Entertainment	Troma NOW
Ferocious Female Freedom Fighters (1982)	Global screenings	Troma Team Video	Troma DVD		Troma NOW
Deadly Daphne's Revenge (1981)	Nationwide screenings	Troma Team Video	Brentwood	Vinegar Syndrome	Troma NOW
Stuck on You! (1982)	Global screenings	Troma Team Video	Troma DVD, Troma Retro	Troma Entertainment	Troma NOW
The Last Horror Film (1982)	Limited screenings	Media Home Entertainment, Troma Team Video	Troma DVD, Tromasterpiece Collection	Troma Entertainment, 88 Films, Severin	Troma NOW, Amazon Prime Video
The First Turn-On! (1983)	Global screenings	Troma Team Video	Troma DVD, Troma Retro	Troma Entertainment	Troma NOW
Monster in the Closet (1983)	Global screenings	Warner Bros. Home Entertainment, Troma Team Video	Troma DVD		Troma NOW
The Toxic Avenger (1984)	Global screenings	Lightning Video, Troma Team Video	Troma DVD	Troma Entertainment, Vinegar Syndrome, Refuse Films	Troma NOW
Combat Shock (1984)	Global screenings	Lightning Video, Troma Team Video	Troma DVD, Tromasterpiece Collection, Arrow Video	Synapse Films	Troma NOW
Splatter University (1984)	Global screenings	Troma Team Video		Vinegar Syndrome, Refuse Films	
Igor and the Lunatics (1985)	Global screenings	Troma Team Video	Troma DVD	Vinegar Syndrome	Troma NOW
When Nature Calls (1985)	Global screenings	RCA/Columbia Pictures Home Video, Troma Team Video	Troma DVD		Troma NOW
Lust for Freedom (1985)	Nationwide screenings	Troma Team Video	Troma DVD, Hollywood DVD	Troma Entertainment, Vinegar Syndrome	Troma NOW
Hollywood Zap! (1986)	Nationwide screenings	Troma Team Video, PRISM			Troma NOW
Student Confidential (1986)	Limited screenings	Media Home Entertainment, Troma Team Video	Troma DVD	Severin	Troma NOW
Class of Nuke 'Em High (1986)	Global screenings	Media Home Entertainment, Virgin Group, Troma Team Video	Troma DVD	Troma Entertainment, Refuse Films, Arrow Video	Troma NOW
Girls School Screamers (1986)	Global screenings	Lightning Video, Troma Team Video	Troma DVD	Vinegar Syndrome	Troma NOW
Surf Nazis Must Die (1987)	Nationwide screenings	Media Home Entertainment, Troma Team Video	Troma DVD, Arrow Video	Troma Entertainment	Troma NOW
Chillers (1987)		Media Home Entertainment, Troma Team Video	Troma DVD, Brentwood		Troma NOW
Troma's War (1988)	Global screenings	Virgin Group, Troma Team Video	Troma DVD, Tromasterpiece Collection	Troma Entertainment	Troma NOW
Rabid Grannies (1988)	Global screenings	Media Home Entertainment, Troma Team Video	Troma DVD, Troma Retro	Troma Entertainment, Vinegar Syndrome	Troma NOW
My Neighbor Totoro (1988)	Nationwide screenings	Fox Video			
Jakarta (1988)	Global screenings				
Blades (1989)	Global screenings	Media Home Entertainment, Troma Team Video	Troma DVD	Vinegar Syndrome	Troma NOW
Video Demons Do Psychotown (1989)		Troma Team Video	Brentwood		Troma NOW
Beware: Children at Play! (1989)	Limited screenings	Troma Team Video	Troma DVD	Vinegar Syndrome	Troma NOW
The Toxic Avenger Part II (1989)	Global screenings	Warner Bros. Home Entertainment, Virgin Group, Fox Video, Troma Team Video	Troma DVD, Hollywood DVD	Troma Entertainment, 88 Films, Vinegar Syndrome, Refuse Films	Troma NOW
Fortress of Amerikkka (1989)	Nationwide screenings	Troma Team Video	Troma DVD	Vinegar Syndrome	Troma NOW
Dialing for Dingbats (1989)	Limited screenings	Troma Team Video			Troma NOW, Amazon Prime Video
The Toxic Avenger Part III: The Last Temptation of Toxie (1989)	Global screenings	Troma Team Video	Troma DVD	Troma Entertainment, 88 Films, Vinegar Syndrome, Refuse Films	Troma NOW
They Call Me Macho Woman! (1989)	Global screenings	Troma Team Video	Troma DVD	Vinegar Syndrome	Troma NOW
Luther The Geek (1990)	Limited screenings	Quest Entertainment	Troma DVD	Troma Entertainment, Vinegar Syndrome	Troma NOW
A Nymphoid Barbarian in Dinosaur Hell (1990)	Limited screenings	Troma Team Video	Troma DVD		Troma NOW
Sgt. Kabukiman N.Y.P.D. (1990)	Limited screenings	Troma Team Video	Troma DVD	Troma Entertainment, Vinegar Syndrome, Refuse Films	Troma NOW
Tomcat Angels (1991)		Troma Team Video	Troma DVD		Troma NOW
Sweet Meats (2025)	Limited screenings			Troma Entertainment	Troma NOW

Other Films:

=== 1991 ===
- Class of Nuke 'Em High 2: Subhumanoid Meltdown
- Vegas in Space

=== 1992 ===
- Body Parts

=== 1993 ===
- The Troma System

=== 1994 ===
- House of the Rising
- Class of Nuke 'Em High 3: The Good, the Bad and the Subhumanoid

=== 1995 ===
- Frostbiter: Wrath of the Wendigo

=== 1996 ===
- Blondes Have More Guns
- Tromeo and Juliet

=== 1997 ===
- Hamster PSA (Short film)
- Pterodactyl Woman from Beverly Hills
- Bugged
- Dog Years

=== 1998 ===
- Fag Hag
- Decampitated
- Viewer Discretion Advised

=== 1999 ===
- Backroad Diner
- Terror Firmer

== 2000s ==
=== 2000 ===
- The Rowdy Girls
- Citizen Toxie: The Toxic Avenger IV

=== 2001 ===
- The Making of 'Terror Firmer'

=== 2002 ===
- Apocalypse Soon: The Making of 'Citizen Toxie'
- The Best of Tromadance Film Festival, Volume 1
- All the Love You Cannes!

=== 2003 ===
- Parts of the Family
- Doggie Tails, Vol. 1: Lucky's First Sleep-Over

=== 2004 ===
- Period Piece
- Tales from the Crapper

=== 2005 ===
- Make Your Own Damn Movie!

=== 2006 ===
- Debbie Rochon Confidential: My Years in Tromaville Exposed!
- Poultrygeist: Night of the Chicken Dead
- Yeti: A Love Story

=== 2007 ===
- Dancing Into the Future

=== 2008 ===
- Poultry in Motion: Truth Is Stranger Than Chicken

=== 2009 ===
- My Best Maniac (Short film)
- Direct Your Own Damn Movie!
- The Sweet Sound of Dubbing: Dubbing ‘The Sweet Sound of Death’

== 2010s ==
=== 2010 ===
- Troma Digital Studios: A Lesson in BrownRay (Short film)
- The Killer Bra
- Mother's Day
- Klown Kamp Massacre

=== 2011 ===
- PUTA: People for the Upstanding Treatment of Animals
- Father's Day
- The Taint

=== 2012 ===
- Death on the D-List

=== 2013 ===
- Return to Nuke 'Em High Volume 1

=== 2014 ===
- Return to Nuke 'Em High's Buffalo Dreams (Short film)
- A Halloween Carol (Short film)

=== 2015 ===
- Make Your Own Damn Movie: The Master Class
- The Return of Dolphin Man (Short film)
- Dolphinman vs Turkeyman (Short film)
- A Very Troma Christmas (Short film)
- Kabukiman's Non-denominational Holiday Extravaganza (Short film)
- Kabukiman: Behind the Chopsticks (Short film)

=== 2016 ===
- Kabukiman vs Dracula (Short film)
- Kabukiman's Cocktail Corner: Live at the Trocadero Theatre! (Short film)
- KABUKI-CON: Kabukiman's Cocktail Corner Special (Short film)
- Dolphinman Battles the Sex Lobsters (Short film)
- The 12 Slays of Christmas (not to be confused with the 2022 film of the same name)
- President Toxie's Oval Office Address (Short film)
- Essex Spacebin

=== 2017 ===
- Return to Return to Nuke 'Em High AKA Volume 2
- Troma Entertainment's Pre-Pre-Show Hack Job (Short film)
- Another Yeti A Love Story: Life on the Streets
- Heart of Fartness: Troma's First VR Experience Starring the Toxic Avenger (Short film)
- Sgt. Ka-Spooky-Man's Cray-Cray VR Halloween Extravaganza (Short film)

=== 2018 ===
- Troma Now Presents: A Stankmouth New Year's Eve Special (Short film)
- Kabukiman's Cocktail Corner: Loaded in Las Vegas (Short film)
- Troma Now Presents: Tromanda's Tromatic Transformation (Short film)
- Troma Now Presents: March Tromania Madness (Short film)
- Festival to Fascism: Cannes 2017 (Short film)
- Heavy Toxification (Short film)
- Mutant Blast

=== 2019 ===
- Trouble in Nightingale (Short film)
- Blood Stab (Short film)

== 2020s ==
=== 2021 ===
- Divide & Conquer

=== 2022 ===
- Toxie Vs Putin (Short film)
- Toxie Goes to the Drive-In (Short film)
- Eating Miss Campbell

=== 2024 ===
- Special Needs Revolt!

== See also ==
- List of horror films
- List of fantasy films
- Lists of science fiction films
