= Lucker =

Lucker may refer to:

- Lucker (surname), a list of people
- Lücker, a list of people with the surname
- John Lucker, villain of the 1986 horror film Lucker the Necrophagus
- Lucker, Northumberland, England, a village and former civil parish
  - Lucker railway station
