= Brian Oldfield =

American athletics competitor

Personal information
- Nationality: American
- Born: June 1, 1945 Elgin, Illinois, U.S.
- Died: March 26, 2017 (aged 71) Elgin, Illinois, U.S.
- Height: 6 ft 5 in (196 cm)
- Weight: 275 lb (125 kg)

Sport
- Sport: Athletics
- Event: Shot put / discus
- Club: Chicago Track Club

Brian Oldfield (June 1, 1945 – March 26, 2017) was an American athlete and personality of the 1970s and early 1980s. A standout shot putter, Oldfield was credited with making the rotational technique popular. With his "Oldfield spin," he set the indoor and outdoor world records in the sport many times. However, due to his status as a professional athlete his world records in the 1970s were never officially recognized, although he later achieved formal recognition for an American record in 1984.

== Life and career ==
Oldfield was born in Elgin, Illinois, and began his career at Middle Tennessee State University where he won the Ohio Valley Conference championship three times. The University recognized his achievements by inducting him into their athletic Hall of Fame in 2000. Following graduation, he worked as a teacher until he moved to San Jose, and began training for the 1972 Olympics.

Oldfield set his sights on achieving stardom in the shot put as an Olympian. In 1972, he made the United States Olympic team, but finished in sixth place. He bounced back less than a year later by setting his first world record, with a throw of 21.60 m (70 ft 10½ in). However, this record was not official due to his affiliation with ITA professional track and field.

In 1975, his throw of 22.86 m (75 ft) set another unofficial world record due to him being a professional, which at that time was not allowed. Though unofficial, Oldfield's accomplishment did not go unnoticed. After setting this mark, he had earned a cover spot on Sports Illustrated, and also made an appearance in a 1975 issue of Playgirl. In his Sports Illustrated interview, he confidently asserted that he expected to be throwing over 80 ft before 1980.

Oldfield won the British AAA Championships titles in both the shot put and discus throw at the 1980 AAA Championships and in 1984, at age 38, he finally set an official record with a throw of 22.19 m (72 ft 9 in) to set a new American mark. When asked by a commentator how he was able to do it at the event, he responded, "I had a 'throw-gasm.'"

But Oldfield was perhaps at least as well known for his unconventional persona and on-field antics as he was for his athletic performance. Unusual for track athletes at the time, he wore his hair long in a style he dubbed the "Oldfield Mop" and occasionally sported a beard. Oldfield would sometimes smoke cigarettes in between throws at competitions to show that he could beat anyone, even while smoking. He was known for wearing flamboyant outfits, including tie-dyed shirts and Speedo-style shorts. These stunts served not only to raise Oldfield's profile, but frequently unnerved his opponents. At the 1972 United States Olympic Trials, an opponent was quoted as saying, "I will retire the day that I lose to someone like Brian Oldfield." Not surprising for the man who said in the September 1, 1975 Sports Illustrated article about him, "When God created man, he wanted him to look like me."

Oldfield competed in the World's Strongest Man contest in 1978, finishing seventh in a field of ten competitors. He also competed in Scottish Highland Games in the 1970s. Utilizing his experience in the shot put, he set many field records in the Stone put. His career-best throw of 63 ft 1 in in the light stone, accomplished at 1979 still stands today.

Oldfield also starred in the 1989 film Savage Instinct, later renamed They Call Me Macho Woman! as Mongo, the crazed drug lord. In the film, Oldfield wears a special spiked headgear that his character uses to head-butt people to death. The movie was unsuccessful.

Near the end of his life, injuries from his time in competition reduced the athlete to walking with a cane and using a wheelchair.

=== Personal records ===
- Shot put – 7.3 kg (16 lb) for 22.86 metres (75 ft 0 in) (1975) (former world record)
- Open Stone – 11.4 kg (25 lb) for 14.15 metres (46 ft 5 in) (1979) (World Record)
- Open Stone – 7.7 kg (17 lb) for 19.23 metres (63 ft 1 in) (1979) (World Record)
- Weight over bar – 25.5 kg (56 lb) over 5.06 metres (16 ft 7 in) (1979) (Former World Record)

== Death ==
Oldfield died on March 26, 2017, at his home in Elgin, aged 71.
