= Dog years =

Dog years may refer to:

== Biology ==
- Any of various measures used to describe a dog's age in human terms or vice versa; see Aging in dogs § Terminology.

== Arts and entertainment ==
- Dog Years (1997 film), an American action-comedy directed by Robert Loomis
- A Dog Year, 2009 American comedy-drama film
- Dog Years (2017 film), or The Last Movie Star, an American drama directed by Adam Rifkin
- Dog Years (novel), a 1963 novel by Günter Grass
- Dog Years, a 2007 novel by Mark Doty
- Dog Years (EP), a 2017 EP by the Winery Dogs
- Dog Years, a 2004 comedy album by Mike Birbiglia
- Dog Years, a 2021 album by the Night Game
- "Dog Years", a 2024 song by Halsey from The Great Impersonator
- "Dog Years", a 2016 song by Maggie Rogers from Now That the Light Is Fading
- "Dog Years", a 1996 song by Rush from Test for Echo

== See also ==
- Year of the dog (disambiguation)
