= Cars 3 (disambiguation) =

Cars 3 is a 2017 American animated film and the third in the Cars franchise.

Cars 3 may also refer to:

- Cars 3 (2009 film), a film directed by Bobby Hacker
- Cars 3: Driven to Win, a 2017 video game based on the film

== See also ==
- Cars (disambiguation)
