= Rabid Grannies =

- Theatrical release film poster
- Directed by: Emmanuel Kervyn
- Written by: Emmanuel Kervyn
- Produced by: Jean-Bruno Castelain; Pierre Nanta; Jonathan Rambert; Johan Vandewoestijne
- Starring: Catherine Ayemerie; Caroline Braeckman
- Cinematography: Hugo Labye
- Edited by: Philippe Ravoet
- Music by: Jean-Bruno Castelain; Pierre-Damien Castelain
- Production company: Stardust Pictures
- Distributed by: Troma Entertainment
- Release date: 1988
- Running time: 91 minutes
- Countries: Belgium; France
- Languages: English; French

Rabid Grannies is a 1988 Belgian/French horror comedy film written and directed by Emmanuel Kervyn. It stars Danielle Daven and Anne-Marie Fox as elderly sisters who, after receiving a present from an ostracized black sheep relative, kill their greedy family. It was distributed in the US on VHS and DVD by Troma Entertainment, who made severe cuts to the film. In 1990, the film was nominated for an International Fantasy Film Award, Best Film for Emmanuel Kervyn.

== Plot ==
Escorted by their butler, Radu, elderly twins Elizabeth and Victoria Remington spend their morning enjoying themselves through their West Flanders, Belgium. To celebrate their upcoming birthday, they invite their extended family to their estate. Elizabeth and Victoria’s guests include their niece, Helen, her husband, John, and her young children, Suzie and Gilbert; nephew, Fred, and his much younger new wife, Jessica; niece, Erika, and her young lover, Rachel; nephew, Harvey; nephew, Roger; nephew, Father Percival; and their niece, Bertha.

Unbeknownst to Elizabeth and Victoria, their guests are only attending the dinner party in hopes of inheriting the sisters’ wealth upon their deaths, much to the chagrin of Radu and Miss Barnstable, the estate’s chef.

As the evening progresses, tensions rise between the relatives: Roger steals Rachel’s affections away from Erika, Helen attempts to expose Harvey’s unsavory business practices to their aunts, Percival threatens Helen’s children, and a drunken Jessica publicly voices her doubts about her marriage to Fred. All of this goes right of Elizabeth and Victoria’s heads as they enjoy the evening none the wiser.

Alerted to someone’s presence at the main gate, Miss Barnstable sends the maid, Alice, to investigate. She comes across a mysterious woman, who hands Alice a gift box before leaving. Alice gives it to Elizabeth and Victoria as they are opening gifts, discovering it to be a present from Christopher, a Satanist previously disinherited from the family for his beliefs. As the sisters reconsider their judgement of Christopher while the other relatives argue about him, the box unleashes a demonic smoke that eventually possesses Elizabeth and Victoria when it contaminates their wine.

Suzie excuses herself to the restroom as a birthday cake is brought out for dessert. Elizabeth and Victoria transform into demonic monsters and devour Erika’s head at the dinner table. Horrified, the family quickly disperses throughout the house. In the ensuing chaos, Alice and Miss Barnstable are killed.

Roger and Jessica wound Victoria before attempting to escape by car. Although they make it to the gate, they are intercepted by Elizabeth, who twists Roger’s neck and forces Jessica to sing “Happy Birthday” to her before fatally pinning her to the fence with the car.

Rachel, Helen, and Gilbert separate from John and Percival to find Suzie, who is quickly discovered by Elizabeth after leaving the restroom and dismembered. Upon discovering her body, the trio is pursued into the mansion’s chapel, where Rachel successfully keeps the demons at bay as Helen becomes catatonic.

John abandons Percival to find Helen and his children, only to instead come across Bertha, Fred, and Harvey barricaded in a parlor. Splitting up to find survivors and escape, John and Bertha find Radu hiding in the kitchen while Fred and Harvey are brutally torn apart by the sisters, who then use one of Harvey’s guns to force Percival into committing suicide.

Realizing that Christopher’s gift box is to blame for the pandemonium, Bertha and John agree to make a run for the chapel and destroy it. Radu has a breakdown and admonishes the two for their previous actions, calling out the Remington family’s greed before being killed by Victoria.

While Bertha makes a run for the chapel, John attempts to keep Elizabeth and Victoria at bay before he is snapped in half. Bertha narrowly manages to make it to the chapel unscathed. As Elizabeth and Victoria begin breaking through the door, Bertha uses a large crucifix to smash the box into pieces, transforming her aunts back into their original selves.

The following morning, Elizabeth and Victoria are questioned by law enforcement while Helen, driven insane by night’s events, is taken away for treatment. Rachel promises Gilbert that she will look after him until his mother is released from the hospital, to which he happily agrees.

Bertha leaves the estate in a taxi. As the ride progresses, she begins showing signs of demonic possession and transforms in the backseat before mauling the driver to death.

== Cast ==
Character	Actor
Helen	Catherine Aymerie
Suzie	Caroline Braeckman
Gilbert	Richard Cotica
Elizabeth Remington	Danielle Daven
Alice	Patricia Davia
Father Percival	Robert Du Bois
Bertha	Florine Elslande
Victoria Remington	Anne-Marie Fox
Publicity executive	Franklin Steward Granvel
Miss Barnstable	Paule Herreman
Erika	Bobette Jouret
Jessica	Françoise Lamoureux
Taxi-driver	Le Pepe
Reverend Father	Raymond Lescot
John	Elie Lison
Roger	Michel Lombet
Harvey	Jacques Mayar
Rachel	Françoise Moens
Elizabeth, the monster	Joëlle Morane
Radu	Sébastien Radovitch
Woman at the gate	Cindy Rimoe
Victoria, the monster	Suzane Vanina
Fred	Guy Van Riet
Police officer	Jonathan Rambert
Gardiner	Jan De Ketelare
Peasant	Johan Vandewoestijne

== Production ==
After the production of Lucker the Necrophagus, Johan Vandewoestijne met with director Emmauel Kervyn at the Brussels offices of VDS Films. Emmanuel was a martial art expert and had a project called "Talion" that he wanted to shoot with Jean-Claude Van Damme. André Coppens, manager of VDS Films engaged himself to produce the film. After doing long weeks of preparation there came a time when they had to order, for instance raw stock, rent camera equipment, rent lighting and grip material but producer Coppens had no money left on his account. Fortunately Kervyn had the script of a horror movie called 'The Long Night' ready to be used. The movie was shot from October 14, 1988, to January 8, 1989, on location in Kortrijk and in the castle of Ingelmunster. To sell the movie internationally, the director made all the French-speaking cast read their English lines phonetically.

== Release ==
The film was released and distributed in the US on VHS and DVD by Troma Entertainment. The Troma release removes a lot of the gore from the feature film. These scenes are available as bonus features on the DVD. Its Blu-ray debut was 10 March 2015, presenting the film in a "producer's cut" with the gore scenes reinstated. Special features are the same as the original Troma DVD.

== Reception ==
Due to its unusual subject and title and its graphic scenes of gore, Rabid Grannies is one of the most infamous titles in the Troma library. Kervyn, the director, felt Troma's cuts made the film incomprehensible, but cult film fans found the film's bizarre incomprehensibility entertaining.

In 1990, Rabid Grannies was nominated for one International Fantasy Film Award, Best Film for Emmanuel Kervyn.
