= Ken Sagoes =

American actor

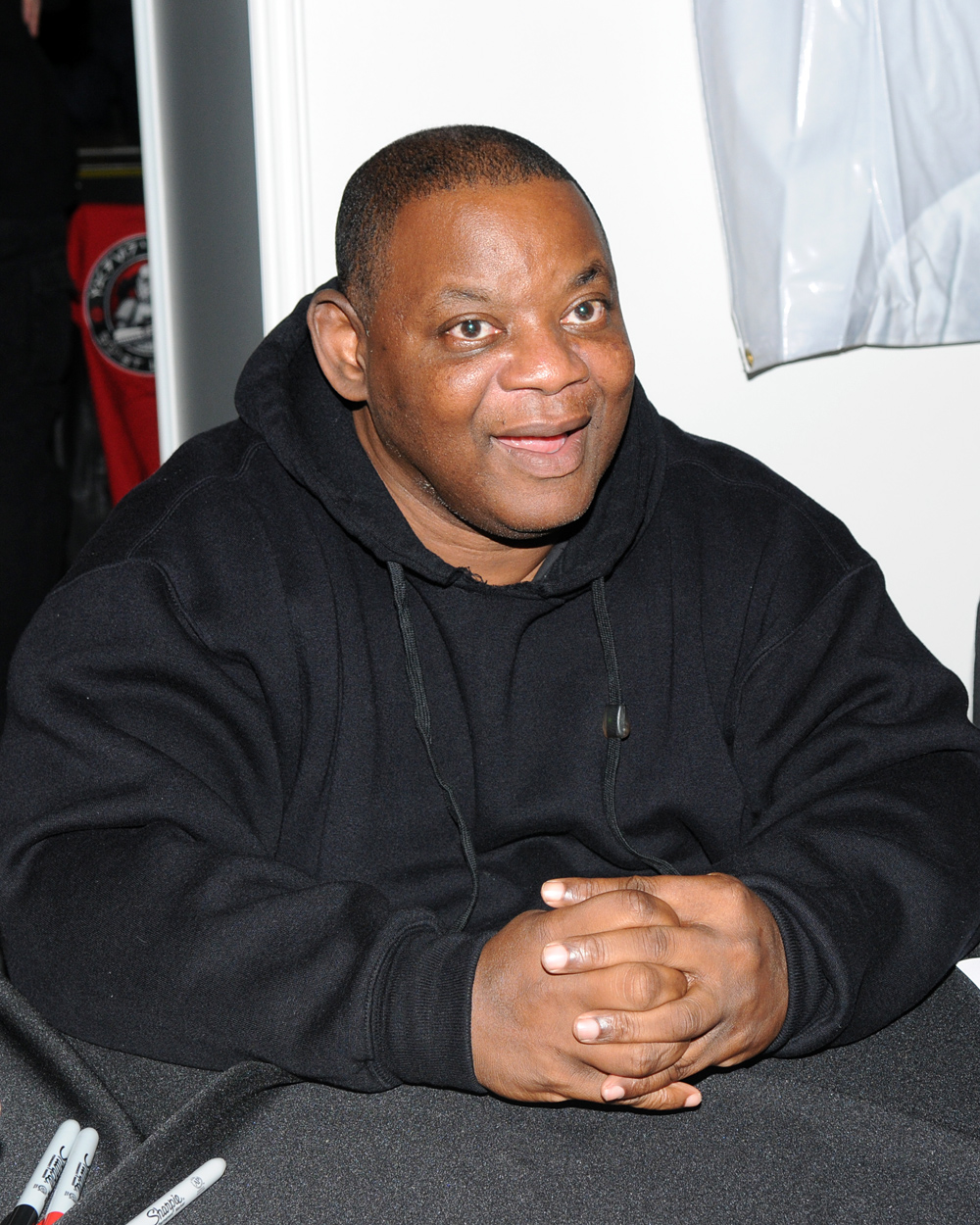
- Sagoes in 2013
- Born: April 28, 1964 (age 62); Stockbridge, Georgia, U.S.A.
- Occupation: Actor
- Years active: 1985–present

Ken Sagoes (born April 28, 1964) is an American actor. He is best known for his role as Roland Kincaid in the fantasy horror film A Nightmare on Elm Street 3: Dream Warriors (1987) and the sequel A Nightmare on Elm Street 4: The Dream Master (1988). Sagoes portrayed Darryl in the television show What's Happening Now!! He has made guest appearances on shows such as The Twilight Zone (Episode: "But Can She Type?"), Night Court, My So-Called Life, Martin, The Parkers, The Division, and The District.

== Filmography ==
=== Film ===
Year	Title	Role	Notes
1986	Say Yes	Second Cop	
1987	A Nightmare on Elm Street 3: Dream Warriors	Roland Kincaid	
1987	Project X	Patrolman	
1988	A Nightmare on Elm Street 4: The Dream Master	Roland Kincaid	
1988	Death by Dialogue	Lenny	
1997	Rosewood	Big Baby	
2002	The Back Lot Murders	Mike	
2003	Intolerable Cruelty	Gus's Pal	
2010	Never Sleep Again: The Elm Street Legacy	Himself	Documentary film
2012	Brother White	Clayton Hampton	
2015	No Solicitors	Marvin	
2016	Gorenos	Haywood	
2019	In Search of Darkness	Himself	Documentary film

=== Television ===
Year	Title	Role	Notes
1985	The Twilight Zone	Workman	Episode: "But Can She Type?"
1986	Airwolf	Desk Clerk	Episode: "Discovery"
1986	The George McKenna Story	Mark Rogers	Television film
1987-1988	What's Happening Now!!	Darryl	22 episodes
1994	On Promise Land	Bo Henry	Television film
1994	My So Called Life	paramedic	Episode: “Other People’s Mothers”
2008	'Til Death	Byron	2 episodes
2012	It's Always Sunny in Philadelphia	Carl	Episode: "The Gang Dines Out"

== Awards and recognition ==
- 2008: NAACP Theatre Award nomination for Best Supporting Male - Local, George Washington's Boy
