= The Last Porno Flick =

1974 film

- Directed by: Ray Marsh
- Written by: Larry DiTillio
- Story by: Joseph Torchio
- Starring: Frank Calcanini; Michael Pataki; Marianna Hill; Mike Kellin; Robyn Hilton
- Music by: Don Caverhill
- Release date: 1974
- Running time: 88 minutes
- Country: United States
- Language: English

The Last Porno Flick (also known as Those Mad, Mad Moviemakers) is an American 1974 comedy film, starring Marianna Hill and directed by Ray Marsh.

== Plot ==
Tony and Ziggy two young men eager to capitalize on the Deep Throat craze, wish to make a pornographic film. They raise money from their family and friends by claiming that they are making a religious film. Complications ensue when their pornographic production becomes a hit.

== Cast ==
- Frank Calcagnini as Tony
- Michael Pataki as Ziggy
- Mike Kellin as Boris
- Marianna Hill as Mary
- Jo Anne Meredith as Jessica
- Robyn Hilton as Linda Loveman
- Tom Signorelli as O.D.
- Carmen Zapata as Mama Theresa
- Antony Carbone as Vittorio
- Raf Mauro as Gaffer

== See also ==
- List of American films of 1974
