= Year of the dog =

Year of the dog(s) may refer to:

- Dog (zodiac), the 11th animal in the 12-year cycle of Chinese astrology
- Year of the Dog (album), a 1994 album by Wolfstone
- "Year of the Dog" (Hart to Hart), an episode of Hart to Hart
- "Year of the Dog" (The Loop), an episode of The Loop
- The Year of the Dog (film), a 1994 Russian drama by Semyon Aranovich
- Year of the Dogs, a 1997 documentary about an Australian-rules football team
- Year of the Dog (film), a 2007 American comedy-drama by Mike White
- Year of the Dog... Again, a 2006 album by DMX

== See also ==
- Dog years (disambiguation)
