= Jacques Urbont =

Composer

- Other names: Jack Urbont
- Occupation: Composer

Jacques "Jack" Urbont is a composer. Urbont is best known for composing the theme songs for The Marvel Super Heroes cartoon series.

== Career ==
Urbont composed the music for the off-Broadway shows Livin' the Life, All in Love, and Stag Movie. Livin' the Life premiered in 1957 and starred Francis Barnard and Alice Ghostley. All in Love premiered in 1961 and starred David Atkinson and Gaylea Byrne. Stag Movie premiered in 1971 and starred Hy Anzell and Adrienne Barbeau.

He wrote the original theme songs for the Marvel cartoons when he met Stan Lee, and though he didn't yet know him, asked Lee for his comics and in a week wrote the themes on spec, hoping Lee would like them, and saying when he was done, Lee would wish he wrote them himself. Later, Lee admitted that he did in fact wish he wrote them. Urbont composed or arranged the theme music for several daytime soap operas, including General Hospital, One Life to Live, All My Children, and Guiding Light.

Urbont composed the theme songs for The Marvel Super Heroes cartoon series, which premiered in 1966.

In 1969, Urbont helped produce a Christmas album for each NFL team.

His theme for General Hospital was one of the longest running themes for a soap opera.

Urbont composed the music for the movie Video Vixens, which premiered in 1975.

== Lawsuits ==
In 2011, Urbont sued Ghostface Killah for copyright violation for his use of The Marvel Super Heroes Iron Man theme song in his 2000 album Supreme Clientele. Urbont lost the lawsuit at the District Court level. That decision was overturned on appeal.

== Awards ==
Urbont was nominated for four Daytime Emmy awards, winning once for Lorne Greene's New Wilderness. Urbont was also nominated for three Primetime Emmy awards for Bronk and one for The Supercops.
