= Robyn Hilton =

American actress and model from 1974 to 1985

- Hilton in Blazing Saddles (1974)
- Born: Robyn Jo Rapp; July 13, 1944 (age 82); Carthage, Missouri
- Occupations: Actress; model
- Years active: 1971–1985
- Spouses: William H. Hilton (m. 1961; div. 1968); Alan Mihoces (m. 1990; div. 2016)
- Children: 3

Robyn Hilton (born Robyn Jo Rapp, July 13, 1944) is an American former film and television actress and model. Hilton was active in the 1970s and 1980s, especially following her debut supporting role as Miss Stein, the secretary to Governor William J. Le Petomane, in Mel Brooks' 1974 comedy film Blazing Saddles.

== Early life and career ==
Hilton was born in Carthage, Missouri and raised in Twin Falls, Idaho, and Pomona, California, the daughter of Erma Jeane Upp and Eugene M. Rapp, a newscaster on WMBH in Joplin, Missouri. They divorced roughly 4 months after her birth, with Upp awarded sole custody and $7 a week in child support. In 1946 her mother married Russell Bruce Beard, with the marriage ending in divorce in 1950. She next married James Elias Molyneux, on September 8, 1950.

Hilton attended the Shamrock School (8 miles southeast of Twin Falls), Emerson Junior High school in Pomona, Twin Falls High School, Boise Junior College, and Utah State University before becoming a weather forecaster in her home town. She is Mormon.

In addition to other film and television work, Hilton appeared as a guest on The Tonight Show Starring Johnny Carson on January 17, 1974, and appeared clothed in two Playboy issues that year. She also appeared in commercials for Dodge, Prell, and other products. Her last credited role was in the role of "Maid Marian" in the Andy Sidaris directed sexploitation action film Malibu Express in 1985.

== Personal life ==
From September 1961 until their divorce seven years later, Hilton was the wife of William H. Hilton, with whom she had two children. In 1990 she married Alan Mihoces, with whom she had one child, divorcing him in 2016.

== Filmography ==
- Cry Uncle! (1971) as uncredited cowgirl
- Bonnie's Kids (1972) as uncredited secretary
- Wonder Women (1973) as uncredited blonde
- Mean Mother (1973) as blonde
- Blazing Saddles (1974) as Miss Stein
- The Single Girls (1974) as Denise
- The Last Porno Flick (1974; also known as Those Mad, Mad Moviemakers) as Linda Loveman
- The Rookies episode (1974) as Crystal
- Police Woman episode "Shoefly" (1974) as Trudy
- Video Vixens (1974) as Inga
- Doc Savage: The Man of Bronze (1975) as Karen
- Death Among Friends (1975 TV movie) as Nancy
- Starsky and Hutch episode "Huggy Bear and the Turkey" (1977) as Miss O'Toole
- Malibu Express (1985) as Maid Marian
