= Lucker (surname) =

Lucker is a surname. Notable people with the surname include:

- Mitch Lucker (1984–2012), American vocalist and songwriter
- Raymond Alphonse Lucker (1927–2001), American prelate of the Catholic Church
- Zöe Lucker (born 1974), English actress

== See also ==
- Lücker, a list of people with the surname
- Luckey
