= Getting Lucky =

1990 film by Michael Paul Girard

- DVD cover
- Directed by: Michael Paul Girard
- Written by: Michael Paul Girard
- Produced by: Philip J. Jones
- Starring: Steven Cooke; Lezlie Z. McCraw; Rick McDowell; Garry Kluger
- Cinematography: Gerald M. Williams
- Edited by: Tony Miller
- Music by: Miriam Cutler; Michael Paul Girard
- Production companies: Mach Studios, Inc.
- Distributed by: Troma Entertainment
- Release date: 1989
- Running time: 85 minutes
- Country: United States
- Language: English
- Budget: $20,000

Getting Lucky (also known as Wish Me Luck) is a 1989 American fantasy-comedy film written and directed by Michael Paul Girard.

== Plot ==
Bill Higgins (Steven Cooke) is a down-on-his-luck nerd who needs cash to go to medical school, and so he gets a job as the school basketball team's towel boy. At the gym he sees Krissi (Lezlie Z. McCraw), who he says he has had a crush on since the seventh grade. Bill is humiliated by the team on his first day, and after accidentally tossing rancid milk all over Tony (Rick McDowell) and Krissi (who are about to have sex behind the gym), he quits the job and returns to collecting recycling for spare change.

While trying to toss a beer bottle in a dumpster, he discovers that it contains a leprechaun, Lepkey (Garry Kluger), who has been imprisoned in the bottle for being a drunk. In order to get out he must grant someone three wishes. For Bill's first wish, he wishes for a date with Krissi, which is immediately granted. On their date Krissi ditches Bill, and meets up with Tony instead. Once again Bill interrupts Tony's attempts to have sex with Krissi, much to Tony's chagrin. That night Lepkey, in order to make up for his poor first wish attempt, grants a replacement wish for a new car, and gives Bill a red Pinto.

Krissi, feeling bad, goes on a genuine date with Bill to play miniature golf. Afterwards, Bill sees Tony driving towards Krissi's house. Concerned for her safety, Bill asks Lepkey to turn him into a cat as his second wish so he can get into Krissi's house to protect her. Sure enough, Tony arrives and attempts to rape Krissi, but he is interrupted by Bill (in cat form) and Krissi's mother, who calls the police and Tony is arrested.

The next day, Bill's Pinto won't start, and Bill instead picks her up on his bike. In a wish gone wrong, Bill is shrunk down and accidentally ends up in Krissi's underwear as she rides to school, and is unable to escape. After cheerleading practice Bill is returned to normal size in the women's locker room, and gets in trouble. Despite this Krissi and Bill decide to go steady after school.

Bill, as a third wish, gets Lepkey to give him $300,000 for medical school, and Bill mails him back to Ireland. That night Bill proposes to Krissi and she says yes. They get married, and after the wedding Tony kidnaps Krissi. Bill gives chase, ultimately having a sword fight with shish kabobs in which Tony accidentally skewers a wasp's nest and is defeated. Bill tells Krissi the whole story of Lepkey and the three wishes. Krissi accuses Bill of being dishonest, but at that moment Lepkey appears in the non-alcoholic sparkling wine bottle Bill had purchased, confirming the entire tall tale.

== Principal cast ==
- Steven Cooke as Bill Higgins
- Lezlie Z. McCraw as Krissi Shackler
- Rick McDowell as Tony Chanuka
- Garry Kluger as Lepkey the Leprechaun
- Jean Stewart as Babette

== Additional information ==
- The working title of this film was Wish Me Luck. A remake with a slightly altered storyline using the working title Wish Me Luck was released in 1995.
