= Curse of the Cannibal Confederates =

- VHS cover
- Directed by: Tony Malanowski
- Screenplay by: Lon Huber
- Story by: Tony Starke
- Produced by: Tony Malanowski
- Starring: Steve Sandkuhler; Christopher Gummer; Rebecca Bach; Judy Dixon; Mark Redfield
- Cinematography: Ben Mario; Bobby Ogden
- Edited by: Sharla Darke; Jackie Jones
- Music by: Charlie Barnett
- Production company: Little Warsaw Productions
- Distributed by: Troma Entertainment
- Release date: 1982
- Running time: 89 minutes
- Country: United States
- Language: English

Curse of the Cannibal Confederates (also known as The Curse of the Screaming Dead) is a 1982 American horror film directed by Tony Malanowski and distributed by Troma Entertainment. The film follows six friends who unwittingly raise the undead corpses of Confederate soldiers.

== Plot ==
A group of six friends (Mel, Wyatt, Bill, Blind Kiyomi, Lin, and Sarah) are on a deer hunt in the southern United States. Kiyomi hears noises in the distance, and her boyfriend Mel goes to investigate. He then leads the others to a church graveyard in the woods where long-dead Confederate soldiers from the American Civil War are buried. The group argues over whether to take the items that they find in the graves. Unbeknownst to the others, Mel takes a diary from one of the soldiers. They set up camp, and that night, they are attacked by the soldiers, who are now zombies. The group manages to fight the soldiers off with their guns. They leave the area and are stopped by police officers, who do not believe their story. Soon after, they are attacked by the soldiers again; Bill and the officers are killed and eaten. The others retreat to an abandoned house. The soldiers follow them there and kill Kiyomi, Sarah, and Mel. Wyatt gives the diary back, and the soldiers leave.

== Cast ==
- Steve Sandkuhler as Wyatt
- Christopher Gummer as Mel
- Rebecca Bach as Sarah
- Judy Dixon as Lin
- Jim Ball as Bill
- Bumb Roberts as Deputy Franklin
- Mark Redfield as Captain Matthew Mahler
- Richard Ruxton as Police Captain Hal Fritz
- Mimi Ishikawa as Blind Kiyomi

== Production ==
Filming took place in Maryland.

The film is a remake of sorts. It is based on a film that director Malanowski had collaborated with star Steve Sandkuhler, known as Night of Horror. The former was also about dead Confederate soldiers tormenting a bunch of vacationers in a Winnebago. That film had no bodycount, and the confederates were only shown in silhouettes. Malanowski decided to remake his own film, with added gore scenes.

== Legacy ==
In his book, All I Need to Know About Filmmaking I Learned from The Toxic Avenger, Troma president Lloyd Kaufman lists this among the five worst films in Troma's library.

Mark Redfield, who played a minor role in the film, was one of the few crew members whose career continued after the film; he directed and starred in the critically successful 2006 film The Death of Poe. Coincidentally, in Redfield's first collaboration with Malanowski, Night of Horror, one of the characters constantly quotes Poe's poem, The Raven.
