= Teenage Catgirls in Heat =

1997 film by Scott Perry

- DVD cover
- Directed by: Scott Perry
- Written by: Scott Perry; Grace Smith
- Produced by: Scott Perry; Grace Smith
- Starring: Dave Cox; Esmeralda Huffhines; Gary Graves; Helen Griffiths; Carrie Vanston; Nancy VanHoozer
- Cinematography: Thad Halcli
- Music by: Randy Buck; Nenad Vugrinec
- Distributed by: Troma Entertainment
- Release date: 1993
- Running time: 95 minutes
- Country: United States
- Language: English

Teenage Catgirls in Heat (originally titled Catgirls) is a 1993 comedy film co-written and directed by Scott Perry and distributed by Troma Entertainment.

== Plot ==
The film is set in a small town, where an Egyptian cat god manifests in the form of a cheap statue. He turns cats into human women, and directs them to procreate with and thereafter kill human men, and take over the world. Ralph, a bumbling hitchhiker, and Warren, a "cat exterminator", join forces against the cats, but Ralph inadvertently falls for Cleo, one of the cats turned into human form.

== Production ==
Teenage Catgirls in Heat was filmed in Austin, Texas.

== Reception ==
Marc Savlov for The Austin Chronicle gave the film one star out of 5. He found the dialogue bad, and the violence "cheesy". Richard Propes of The Independent Critic gave it a grade of A−, calling it "the ultimate B-movie". Film critic Joe Bob Briggs gave it four stars and called it a "pretty decent [film]". TV Guide rated the film at two out of four stars, stating that "this is one of the better independent films to be released on video by Troma. Unfortunately, this genial parody eventually sinks under the constraints of a miniscule [sic] budget." Joe Kane in Phantom of the Movies' Videoscope, said the film "happily lives up to its madcap moniker", giving it three stars out of four and praising the script and actors' performances.
