= Lücker =

Lücker is a surname. Notable people with the surname include:

- Alfred Lücker (1931–2008), German field hockey player
- Arno Lücker (born 1979), German composer, musicologist, music critic and music dramaturge
- Martin Lücker (born 1953), German classical organist and academic
- Monika Lücker (born 1944), Swiss luger

== See also ==
- Lucker (surname)
