= Ingelmunster Castle =

Castle in Belgium

- Belgium
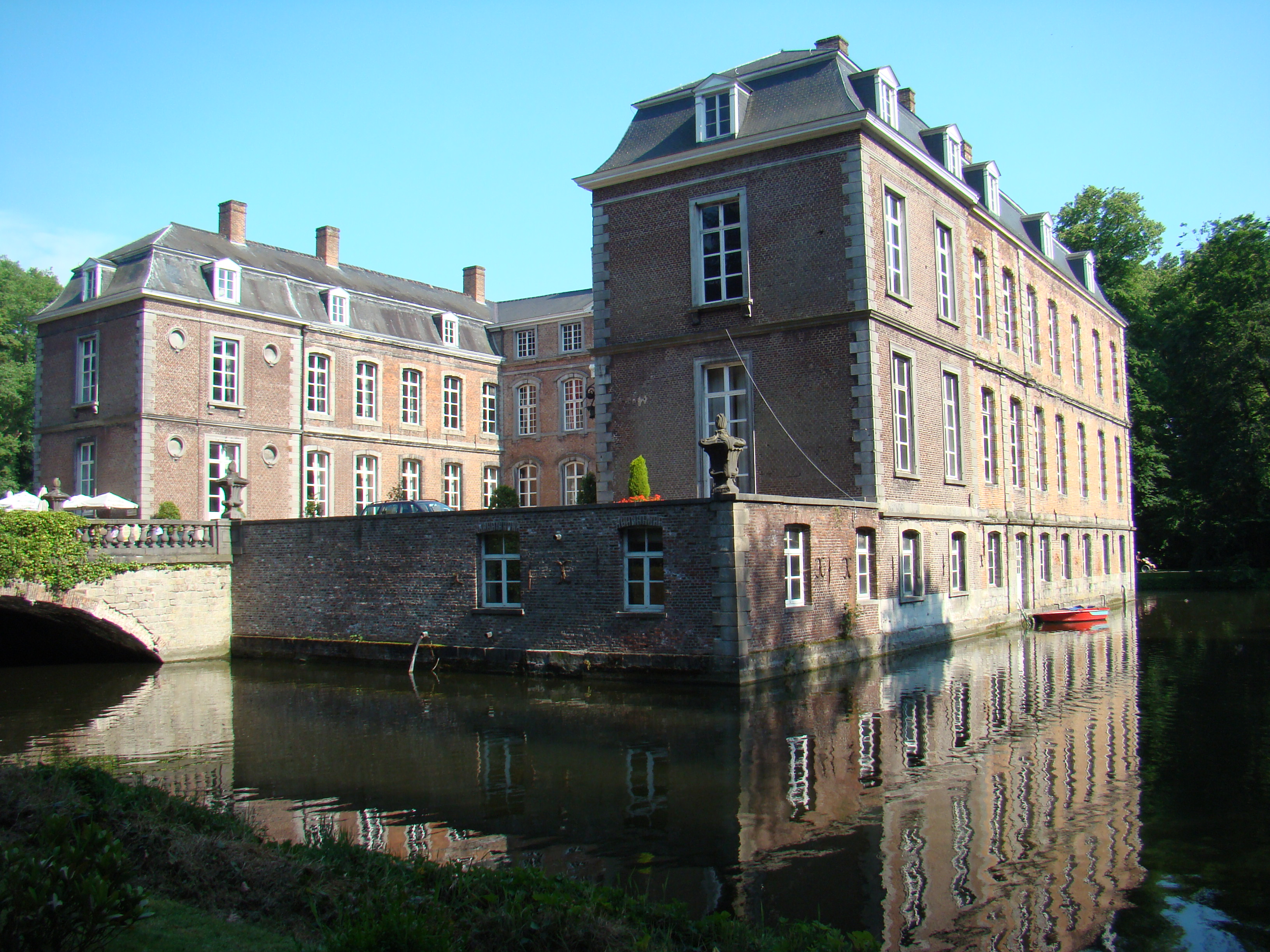

Site information
- Type: Castle

Ingelmunster Castle (Dutch: Kasteel van Ingelmunster) is a stately home in Ingelmunster, West Flanders, Belgium.

== See also ==
- List of castles in Belgium
