= Another Yeti A Love Story: Life on the Streets =

- Promotional poster
- Directed by: Adam Deyoe; Eric Gosselin
- Written by: Adam Deyoe; Eric Gosselin; Jim Martin
- Produced by: Adam Deyoe; Eric Gosselin
- Edited by: Adam Deyoe
- Distributed by: Troma Entertainment
- Release date: 2017
- Running time: 77 minutes
- Country: United States
- Language: English

Another Yeti A Love Story: Life on the Streets, also referred to as Yeti: A Love Story 2: Life on the Streets, is a 2017 comedy horror film directed by Adam Deyoe and Eric Gosselin, and released by Troma Entertainment. It is a sequel to the 2006 film Yeti: A Love Story. The film was partially financed by crowd-funding. Both the first film and this sequel contain elements of gay horror.

== Yeti: A Love Story (2006) ==
The 2006 film was directed by Deyoe and Gosselin and also released by Troma.

=== Plot of the first part ===
In 1985 in the fictional town of Quatssack, New Hampshire the Children of the Yeti, an evil cult, worships a yeti that lives in the woods and is the last of its kind.

Dick, Adam and their girlfriends, college students who came there to camp with friends, are targeted by members of the cult to be sacrificed. But Adam becomes attracted to the yeti and they become lovers.

During fights the yeti is killed so that his whole species seems extinct; however, a prophecy from a Nepalese scroll called The Book of the Yeti had revealed that their fate was linked to the love given by a sodomite, who turns out to be Adam. And the latter drops a hint that he is now pregnant with the yeti's child.

=== Cast ===
- Adam Malamut as Adam, a gay fraternity boy who falls in love with the Yeti
- Dave Paige as Dick, Adam's fraternity brother, whom Adam accuses of being gay
- Mark Wahlberg (not to be confused with Mark Wahlberg) as a priest
- Eric Gosselin as Sex Piss
- Leo Boivin as Raymond, the leader of the Children of the Yeti
- Adam Deyoe as an Old Man, the Yeti's previous owner
- Adam Balevet as Tentacle Boy, a sideshow owned by the Old Man
- Debbie Winger as Debra, a member of the Children of the Yeti

== Premise of the sequel ==
Another Yeti A Love Story: Life on the Streets begins a few years after the events of Yeti: A Love Story. Adam and Dick live in Los Angeles. The first has given birth to a baby yeti, who is kidnapped by a pimp, Pimp Billy Faunz.

== Reception ==
In a review for Dread Central, Kieran Fisher wrote: "From the outlandish story to the witty script and the comedic prowess of the actors, this is rude, crude horror comedy at its most fun." A review at PopHorror stated: "The blood and gore weren’t too heavy on this one, but there was still some fun blood splatter moments. I do wish there was more of it, though. Yeti: A Love Story 2 focused more on the female and male anatomy – plenty of boobs and penises and yes even an adult Yeti penis, which was by far disturbing but hilarious all at the same time’.

Another Yeti A Love Story: Life on the Streets was described as follows in a review at the Daily Grindhouse: "You cannot judge it by any normal standards of film criticism. All that matters is getting the laugh. It achieves that goal with ease, even though I was slightly ashamed to find myself laughing at gags that should have stopped being funny when I was in middle school." A similar assessment is made by other commentators.

== See also ==
- List of horror comedies
- LGBT themes in horror films
