= Stuff Stephanie in the Incinerator =

- VHS cover for 'Stuff Stephanie in the Incinerator'
- Directed by: Don Nardo
- Written by: Don Nardo; Peter Jones
- Produced by: Don Nardo
- Starring: Catherine Dee; William Dame; M.R. Murphy; Dennis Cunningham; Paul Nielsen; Andy Milk
- Distributed by: Troma Entertainment
- Release date: 1989
- Running time: 98 minutes
- Language: English

Stuff Stephanie in the Incinerator (originally titled In Deadly Heat) is a 1989 horror-comedy written and directed by Don Nardo and distributed by Troma Entertainment.

== Premise ==
A wealthy couple and their friend enter a world of sadistic fantasy games of the rich, but as they travel deeper, it becomes difficult to establish exactly what is a game and what is not.

== Tagline ==
Don't throw your love away. Burn it.

== Reception ==
For Horror Society, ”there is no real on-screen deaths. Literally and figuratively. During the fight scene, the three stab and slash at each other. We get fake-blood splatter here and there but no real deaths and because it is staged, we miss out. The film delivers on story and acting but fails at delivering any true horrific moments. The movie tries so hard to be a horror film when it would have been a great mystery or thriller. ’ TV guide is far more positive about the film, praising its complexity and concludes its extensive review by saying: ”Sheer nastiness has never been so much fun."
