= The Glass Jungle =

- DVD cover
- Directed by: Joseph Merhi
- Written by: Joseph Merhi
- Produced by: Richard Pepin; Talaat Captan (associate producer); Charla Driver (associate producer); Ronald L. Gilchrist (executive producer)
- Starring: Lee Canalito; Joe Filbeck; Diana Frank; Mark High; Frank Scala
- Cinematography: Richard Pepin
- Edited by: Paul G. Volk
- Music by: John Gonzalez
- Distributed by: Troma Entertainment
- Release date: 1988
- Running time: 94 minutes
- Country: United States
- Language: English

The Glass Jungle is a 1988 action film directed by Joseph Merhi and distributed by Troma Entertainment. Set on the streets of Los Angeles, the film follows a female detective as she races against time to find the murderer of several prostitutes.
