= Maniac Nurses Find Ecstasy =

1990 Belgium/Hungarian erotic horror film

- DVD cover for 'Maniac Nurses Find Ecstasy'
- Directed by: Léon Paul De Bruyn
- Written by: Léon Paul De Bruyn
- Produced by: Léon Paul De Bruyn
- Starring: Nicole Gyony; Csilla Farago; Hajni Brown; Susanna Makay; Agatha Palace
- Cinematography: Laslo Zentay
- Edited by: Johan Vandewoestijne
- Music by: Phillip Smithe
- Distributed by: Troma Entertainment
- Release date: 1990
- Running time: 74 minutes
- Countries: Belgium; Hungary; United States
- Language: English

Maniac Nurses Find Ecstasy (also known as Bloodsucking Freaks II) is a 1990 erotic horror film written, directed, and produced by Léon Paul De Bruyn (under the pseudonym "Harry M. Love") and distributed by Troma Entertainment.

== Plot ==
A group of lesbian nurses who lure unsuspecting male strangers back to their home to torture them.

== Production ==
Filming for Maniac Nurses took place in Hungary and was billed by Troma as the "first Hungarian-shot sexploitation film". The company also billed it as a sequel to the 1976 exploitation film Bloodsucking Freaks, also distributed by Troma, but has no connection to it whatsoever.

== Release ==
Maniac Nurses was released to home video through Troma Entertainment. The exact release date for the film differs; in his book Belgian Cinema René Michelems gives the year of release as 1991, while VideoHound lists it as 1994 and Mubi lists 1990.

== Reception ==
In their book Psychotherapists on Film, John Flowers and Paul Frizler state that the film was "so bad that we were tempted to swear off movies forever." Joe Bob Briggs recommended the film, calling it one of the strangest that he has ever seen.
