= 1972 Olympics =

1972 Olympics refers to both:

- 1972 Winter Olympics, which were held in Sapporo, Japan
- 1972 Summer Olympics, which were held in Munich, West Germany
