= Contra Conspiracy =

- DVD cover for 'Contra Conspiracy'.
- Directed by: Thomas Dewier
- Written by: Thomas Dewier; Mark Robles
- Starring: Blake Bahner; Robert Beal; Tom Mahler; Duncan Savage; Vickie Stephenson
- Cinematography: Vojislav Mikulic
- Edited by: Steve Walter
- Music by: John Gonzalez
- Distributed by: Troma Entertainment
- Release date: 1988
- Running time: 87 minutes
- Language: English

Contra Conspiracy (also known as Contra Control and Contra Company) is a 1988 action film written and directed by Thomas Dewier which is now distributed by Troma Entertainment. The film was produced by City Lights.

== Premise ==
The plot follows a Hollywood film crew shooting a movie in the Mojave Desert, only to be disrupted by a group of terrorists.

== Reception ==
The film is said to "look(s) for a spell like it might be a television movie remake of Cannibal Holocaust (later it becomes FX and Mad Max 2)"

== See also ==
- Tropic Thunder, a 2008 comedy based on similar premise
