= LGBTQ themes in horror films =

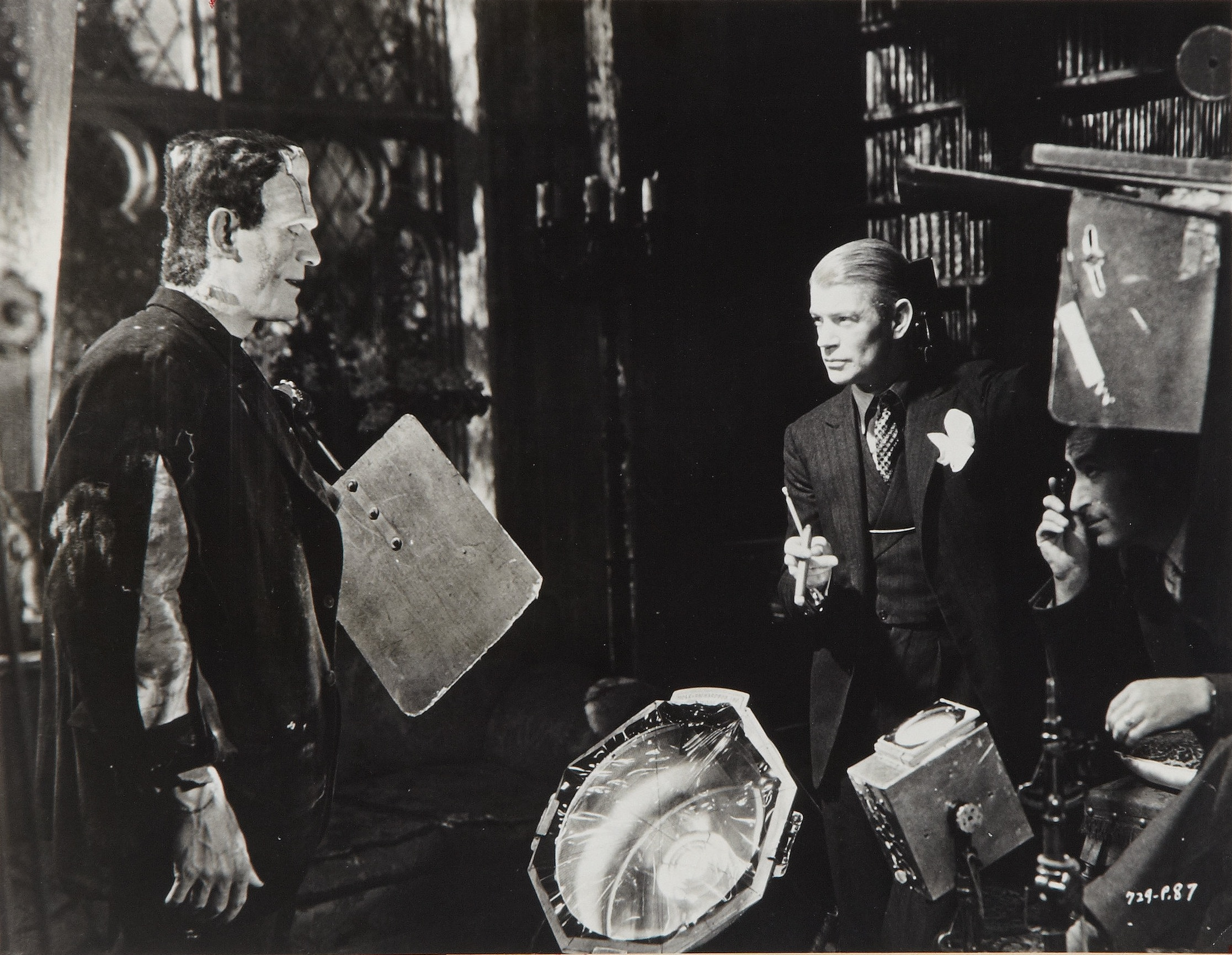
Openly gay director James Whale (middle), actor Boris Karloff (left), and cinematographer John J. Mescall (lower right) on the set of Bride of Frankenstein (1935).

LGBT themes in horror films refers to figurative or literal representations of non-normative gender and/or sexuality within horror films. This may include characters or narratives that are coded as or openly LGBTQ, the appearance of themes and images specific to LGBTQ experiences, or the reading of horror from an LGBTQ perspective.

The horror genre serves as a medium for exploring and expressing societal anxieties. Fears surrounding LGBTQ identities and threats to heteronormativity have thus been projected into the horror genre. Often through the construction of the Other, a figure that exists as opposition to a supposedly normal, functioning society, such as the famous monsters, serial killers, and other antagonists that make up the horror genre. Perceived as a threat to the assumed heterosexual spectator, LGBTQ themes have often been pushed into the shadows, and must be coaxed out through close analysis and theory.

Film scholar Harry Benshoff posits that there are at least four different ways that LGBTQ elements may intersect with the horror film: films with identifiable LGBTQ characters; films written, produced, and/or directed by a member of the LGBTQ community; through subtext or connotation; and through LGBTQ spectatorship.

== History ==
=== Early film ===
The 1910s saw the first narrative horror films as adaptations of gothic fiction, such as Dracula (1897) and The Picture of Dorian Gray (1890), which carried over already existing LGBTQ themes in horror fiction and helped construct the image of the homosexual as monstrous. The German expressionist cinema movement in the first half of the 1920s, which would go on to stylistically influence Hollywood film as its members fled Nazi Germany, has been and still is connected to homosexuality in film. The expressionist filmmaker F. W. Murnau, who adapted Dracula into the historically significant Nosferatu (1922), was homosexual. Yet beyond this, the subject matter of German expressionism often opposed the concept of "normalcy", and was targeted by Nazism in the 1930s for its relationship to "Jews, homosexuals, and other social deviants."

Vaudeville, which served as both a precursor and inspiration to early films, often involved queer subtext through gender-bending and cross-dressing. Vaudeville personnel, who were often queer themselves, began migrating to the film industry. Regulation and censorship was especially uncommon in vaudeville practices. In order to combat and control overt defiance of traditional American gender roles and sexuality, motion picture executives devised a code to regulate behavior in film production.

In 1927, the Motion Picture Producers and Distributors Association (MPPDA) codified a list of elements which members of the association should not, or had to be careful about, portraying. In this list is included any inference of sex perversion and Miscegenation. These two elements play into what Benshoff describes as the binary oppositions which surfaced in horror films of the time period to ultimately present a dichotomy between straight/gay or "normal"/queer. Homosexuality was seen as a construction around gendered hierarchies and thus binaries such as masculine/feminine, master/servant, sadist/masochist, and white/non-white created an avenue for the appearance of LGBTQ themes in early horror films and those made during the production code era.

=== United States ===
==== Production Code Era ====
In March 1930 the Hays Code, which built on many of the existing rules codified by the MPPDA, was established. Although homosexuality was not explicitly named, it was captured under the rule that stated showing "Sex perversion or any inference of it is forbidden." This in part stemmed from the American Great Depression's encouragement of strict gender roles. Homosexuality was thus feared as it questioned these gender and social arrangements. In 1934, the Production Code Administration (PCA) was implemented to enforce the Hays Code.

Despite this, various films of the Hays code and PCA era can be read as having LGBTQ themes. For example, James Whale's Frankenstein (1931) draws on the original subtext within the gothic novel and can be read as a relationship between a queer-child (the Monster) and a rejecting parent (Dr. Frankenstein).

Both Whale's Frankenstein and Bride of Frankenstein (1935) portray what Benshoff calls the "domestic queer couple." In these cases, the relationship between a master/servant or mad scientist/sidekick, takes on homosexual undertones. This can be through the act of homosexual procreation, in which life is created without heterosexual intercourse, such as Dr. Pretorius and Dr. Frankenstein in Bride of Frankenstein or Dr. Moreau and his male assistant Montgomery in Island of Lost Souls (1933). Alternatively, it may be the contrast between gender-roles, such as the "masculine" countess and her "effeminate" servant in Lambert Hillyer's Dracula's Daughter (1936). However, Dracula's Daughter portrays LGBTQ themes beyond the domestic queer couple, through its portrayal and participation in the lesbian vampire trope. This recalls other films of the period, where lesbianism was able to slip past the PCA due to misunderstandings of female sexuality that rendered lesbianism largely unthinkable and invisible within a heteronormative society.

During the Cold War, the monster movie was eclipsed by alien invasion horror. The hidden homosexual became a rampant fear of heterosexual Americans, stemming in part from the red scare, the lavender scare, and similar ideas during WWII that the homosexual would lie about their sexuality and infect "normal" soldiers.

What unified horror films of the code era that contained LGBTQ themes is that heterosexuality and "normalcy" were reinstated by the end of the film through means of killing off of queer-coded monsters, the reunion of previously separated heterosexual couples, and other variations of affirming heteronormativity. Depictions of homosexual characters became acceptable, as long as the ending of the film confirmed them as abnormal and incapable of a happy life.

==== Reagan-Era and the AIDS Crises ====
Like horror films of the 1950s which combined public dread of communist subversion with fears of hidden, malignant homosexuals, many horror films of the 1980s and early 90s built upon the evil homosexual in portraying anxieties surrounding the spread of disease, specifically fear surrounding HIV/AIDS as it began spreading throughout the Western Hemisphere.

The initial confusion surrounding the spread of HIV/AIDS and its conflation with the LGBTQ community led to the demonization and ostracization of LGBTQ people, specifically gay men, who were seen as purposefully infecting those around them. Similarities can be drawn between AIDS and various horror tropes of the period.

The vampire's historical relationship to infectious disease and the plague, as well as similarities between the contagion of fluids and significance of blood, allows for the alignment of the vampire with the spread of HIV/AIDS. Films such as Fright Night (1985) and The Lost Boys (1987) can be analyzed in this respect. The connection is made clearly in Blade (1998) when the vampire villain is referred to as a "sexually-transmitted disease."

In science-fiction horror The Thing (1982) has been discussed as a primary allegorical example for the threat of the pandemic spread of HIV/AIDS. Not being able to detect those who have been "penetrated and replicated" is one of the key elements that incites fear within the film. The entirely male station crew, who liberally indulge in alcohol and marijuana, replicates the media and public imagination of homosexuals being responsible for their own contracting of HIV/AIDS due to indulgent, promiscuous lifestyles.

Other horror films of the era, such as A Nightmare on Elm Street 2: Freddy's Revenge (1985), contributed to negative attitudes towards the LGBTQ community through explicit homophobia and the casual usage of anti-gay slurs.

While still other films, despite lacking clear indications of LGBTQ themes, were discussed in relation to the HIV/AIDS pandemic by viewers. The Hitcher (1986) was described in a review from the same year as a "slasher movie about gay panic, a nasty piece of homophobic angst for the age of AIDS."
