= Death by Dialogue =

- VHS cover
- Directed by: Thomas Dewier
- Written by: Thomas Dewier; Susan Trabue
- Produced by: Charla Driver; Ronald L. Gilchrist; Joseph Merhi; Richard Pepin
- Starring: Ken Sagoes; Laura Albert; Lenny Delducca; Kelly Sullivan; Jude Gerard Prest
- Cinematography: Voya Mikulic
- Edited by: Paul G. Volk
- Music by: John Gonzales
- Distributed by: Troma Entertainment; City Lights Video
- Release date: November 25, 1988 (video premiere)
- Running time: 94 minutes
- Country: United States
- Language: English

Death by Dialogue is a 1988 horror film co-written and directed by Thomas Dewier and distributed by Troma Entertainment.

== Plot ==
The plot centers on a group of college students who go up to a typically creepy mansion for spring break. Unfortunately for all, they stumble upon a possessed horror novel, whose story suddenly starts happening in the real world...with deadly results.
