= Video Demons Do Psychotown =

- DVD cover for Video Demons Do Psychotown
- Directed by: Alessandro De Gaetano; Michael A. DeGaetano
- Written by: Alessandro De Gaetano
- Produced by: Karl A. Coken; Vincent Field; Gregg Ladd; Darrel Walker
- Starring: Ron Arragon; Donna Baltran; Dave Elliott; Pam Martin; Myra Taylor
- Cinematography: Wayne Kohlar
- Edited by: Rocco M. LaBellarte
- Music by: Glenn Longacre
- Distributed by: Troma Entertainment
- Release date: 1989
- Running time: 87 minutes
- Language: English

Video Demons Do Psychotown (also known as Bloodbath in Psycho Town) is a 1989 horror film written and co-directed by Alessandro De Gaetano and starring Ron Arragon, Donna Baltran, Dave Elliott, Pam Martin, and Myra Taylor. It was distributed by Troma Entertainment.

== Premise ==
Two film students visit a spooky old town for the purpose of filming a documentary. Things in the town are not what they seem and before they know it, they are the next target of a mysterious hooded serial killer.

== Production ==
Filming took place in Porter and Lake counties, as well as the Josephus Wolf House in Indiana under the working title of Small Towns are Murder.

== Release ==
The film was released on VHS by American Video in 1989 as Bloodbath in Psycho Town, after which it was picked up and distributed by Troma Entertainment under Video Demons Do Psychotown. It received a DVD release as part of the "Toxie's Triple Terror" series of box sets.

== Reception ==
A review at Horror Society stated, ”The story is bad and hard to follow. Not because it is complicated, but because the film has a hard time actually following the plot. The film is vaguely a slasher film while trying to play on the psychological thriller angle. Finally, the special effects are non-existent which makes the kill scenes horrible to watch. I’ve seen my fair share of low budget slashers and I have seen a lot better kills than what this one offers."

DVD Talk’s also quite negative review found the film "very unsatisfying”
