= Return to Nuke 'Em High Volume 1 =

2013 American science-fiction horror comedy film by Lloyd Kaufman

- Official release poster
- Directed by: Lloyd Kaufman
- Written by: Travis Campbell; Derek Dressler; Aaron Hamel; Additional material: Lloyd Kaufman; Casey Clapp
- Produced by: Lloyd Kaufman; Michael Herz
- Starring: Catherine Corcoran; Asta Paredes; Clay von Carlowitz; Zac Amico; Stefan Dezil; Gabriela Fuhr; Vito Trigo; Mark Quinnette; Mark Baez; Ron Mackay; Reiki Tsuno; Tara E. Miller; Jim Sheppard; Debbie Rochon; Babette Bombshell; William Dreyer; Adam P. Murphy; Brenda Rickert
- Narrated by: Stan Lee
- Cinematography: Justin Duval
- Edited by: Travis Campbell
- Music by: Kurt Dirt
- Production company: Troma Entertainment
- Distributed by: Anchor Bay Films; Freestyle Releasing
- Release dates: May 16, 2013 (Cannes); January 10, 2014
- Running time: 85 minutes
- Country: United States
- Language: English

Return to Nuke 'Em High Volume 1 is a 2013 American science-fiction horror comedy film directed by Lloyd Kaufman. The film, produced by the cult classic B-movie production group Troma Entertainment, is the fourth in the Nuke 'Em High film series.

== Plot ==
In Tromaville High School, two students are getting romantic in a janitor's closet when a pipe bursts above them, covering the couple in green slime and releasing a slug. The slug castrates the boy and the girl is dissolved. Meanwhile, the head of Tromorganic Foodstuffs Conglomerate, Lee Harvey Herzkauf, plots with Tromaville High School principal, Principal Westley, and the President of the United States to poison the students with radioactive tacos, but worry about a rogue student blogger exposing them. The blogger, Chrissy Goldberg, is having trouble being satisfied by her boyfriend, Eugene, and starts to take out her aggression on the new girl, Lauren. After Lauren accidentally throws water at Chrissy during lunch, the two get in a fight but stop to gaze into each other's eyes before both receiving detention. Chrissy's friend Zac tries to ask Lauren out on a date but reacts badly when she rejects him. Boy Genius Terrence Horowitz then starts violently mutating after eating the tainted tacos, ending with his head exploding. Principal Westley blames the death on marijuana use. In detention, Chrissy bullies Lauren, but Lauren defends her when she's nearly sent to the principal's office.

The next day Principal Westley holds an assembly in memory of Terrence Horowitz, where the Glee Club mutates on stage into a vicious gang called The Cretins, who begin terrorizing the town. They blow up a car full of people, throw a teacher and her dog off the Tromaville Falls, and then attack Lauren while she's looking for her pet duck Kevin (who ate toxic waste after escaping his cage). The Cretins shove Kevin down Lauren's throat (referred to in the film as 'duck rape') and Lauren runs into Chrissy, who takes Lauren back to her house and pulls the mutating Kevin out of her throat. Chrissy invites Lauren to go with her to a party at her friend Slater's house, where Eugene breaks up with Chrissy over text. Lauren and Chrissy bond at the party, culminating in them having sex in Slater's bedroom while Lauren starts to mutate. Chrissy tells Lauren that they should come out to the rest of the school, but Lauren is scared of being bullied and decides that they need to stay in the closet. The Cretins bust into the party and burn Slater's house down.

That night, Lauren and Chrissy both mutate, with Lauren's belly becoming swollen and Chrissy growing a large penis. They go to the Cretin's layer and murder several Cretins. Zac tries to join the Cretins, but they tell him in order to be accepted he has to get revenge on Chrissy and Lauren.

The next day Chrissy and Lauren's mutations are gone and they have little memory of the incident. Chrissy finds out that Herzkauf has captured a number of Tromaville High students and are keeping them in cages. She and Lauren kiss before going to class, which Zac secretly films. Chrissy gets into a fight with a Cretin in her science class after being called a homophobic slur, accidentally blinding her teacher, Mr. Chip, with a laser and getting sent to the principal's office. While showering in the locker room, green slime starts to ooze down Lauren's leg.

== Cast ==
- Asta Paredes as Chrissy
- Catherine Corcoran as Lauren
- Vito Trigo as Leonardo
- Clay von Carlowitz as Eugene
- Zac Amico as Zac
- Stefan Dezil as Slater
- Gabriela Fuhr as Kelly
- Mark Quinnette as Michelangelo
- Mike Baez as Donatello
- Ron Mackay as Coach Sandusky
- Reiki Tsuno as Rembrandt
- Tara E. Miller as Rachel Ruysch
- Jim Sheppard as Raphael
- Lemmy as the President
- Lloyd Kaufman as Lee Harvey Herzkauf
- Babette Bombshell as Principal Westly
- William Dreyer as Arnold
- Adam P. Murphy as Mr. Chips
- Brenda Rickert as Aunt Bee
- Dan Snow as Cigar Face
- Debbie Rochon as Coach Kotter
- Mark Kaufman as Kabukicar Passenger
- Sam Qualiana as Bully
- Andrew Elias as Tromaville Citizen (uncredited)
- Stan Lee credited as Peter Parker as The Narrator
- The World Champion as Himself

== Production ==
=== Development ===
A fourth Nuke 'Em High film entitled Battle of the Bikini Subhumanoids was initially announced in 1996. Troma ran a script-writing contest that invited fans to contribute two pages with a weekly winner announced and added to the collective screenplay. Despite a script being finished in 2000, this project never got past the pre-production stage.

Troma again announced production of the sequel in October 2011. Initially, it was stated the film would be made in Spain by Mushnik's Entertainment in collaboration with Chaparra Entertainment. The directors were to be Marc Gras and Dani Moreno. The plot centered around a new group of Cretins who are forced into the role of the protagonists. However, this version also never came to fruition.

After Anchor Bay Entertainment had shown interest in remaking some of the films from Troma's library, Troma started talking to them about doing a co-production. Anchor Bay ended up remaking Troma's Mother's Day while serving as co-producers on a Class of Nuke 'Em High reboot, which became the fourth installment of the Nuke 'Em High series during pre-production.

=== Filming ===
Kaufman began production anew in 2012, directing the film himself in New York and New Jersey. Casting took place throughout June 2012. For the first time, Troma relied on Kickstarter to raise a small amount of funds to support "animal actor" Kevin the Duck. Principal photography began in August 2012 and finished in September.

== Release ==
Initially slated to be a single installment, Kaufman split the film into two volumes, much like The Toxic Avenger Part II and The Toxic Avenger Part III: The Last Temptation of Toxie, after director Quentin Tarantino’'s suggestion, à la Kill Bill.

Return to Nuke 'Em High Volume 1 began a limited North American theatrical release in the fall of 2013, beginning with a screening at the Museum of Modern Art. It expanded in January 2014.

=== Critical reception ===
Reviews were generally mixed. On review aggregator website Rotten Tomatoes, the film received an approval rating of 57% based on 14 reviews, with an average rating of 5/10. On Metacritic, the film has a weighted average score of 40 out of 100 based on 8 critics, indicating "mixed or average reviews".

Variety deemed it "a hearty blast of Troma-branded schlock" while The New York Times said Kaufman fans "will be delighted to learn that time has eroded neither his love of nudity nor his disdain for political correctness." Horror magazine Fangoria gave the film 3.5 out of 4 skulls, calling it "undeniably funny, brave and so unlike anything put out today that it practically demands respect."

== Sequel ==
Kaufman shot Return to Return to Nuke 'Em High AKA Volume 2 with Paredes, Corcoran, and Amico reprising their leading roles. This is not completely accurate. Most of what you see in volume 2 that involves the leads & Cretins was shot as volume 1 in 2012. To secure a distribution deal with Starz, additional footage featuring celebrity cameos & a faux news team was shot long after volume 1 shooting was wrapped. A Kickstarter campaign was set up to raise $50,000 for post-production costs. The campaign ended on June 24, 2015, successfully raising $63,615. The sequel premiered at the Cannes Film Festival in May 2017, with a Los Angeles premiere on March 8, 2018 at the Ahrya Fine Arts Theater in Beverly Hills, California. The movie was eventually released onto Blu-ray on November 12, 2019.
