= Video Vixens =

1974 film by Henri Pachard

- VHS cover, featuring none of the original actors
- Directed by: Henri Pachard
- Written by: Joel Gross
- Produced by: Graham Place
- Starring: Keith Luckett; James Walters; Robyn Hilton; George Buck Flower; Sandy Dempsey
- Cinematography: Arthur D. Marks
- Edited by: Arthur D. Marks; Graham Place
- Music by: Jacques Urbont
- Distributed by: Troma Entertainment
- Release date: 1975
- Running time: 82 minutes
- Country: United States
- Language: English

Video Vixens (also known as Black Socks) is a 1975 sex comedy film written by Joel Gross and directed by Ron Sullivan under the pseudonym Henri Pachard.

Sandra Peabody and Steve Miner from the 1972 horror film The Last House on the Left worked as the script supervisor and assistant editor respectively. The film stars Keith Luckett, James Walters, George Buck Flower, Con Covert, and Robyn Hilton. It was distributed by Troma Entertainment.

== Premise ==
The plot follows the fictional television broadcast station WKLITT as they broadcast a stag film award show. The film is made up of several vignettes regarding the preparation of the show, clips from fictional movies, and parodies of commercials.

== Cast ==
- Keith Luckett as Gordon Gordon Jr.
- James Walters as Newscaster
- Philip Luther as Gordon Gordon (credited as Harrison Phillips)
- Norman Fields as Clifford Bradley (credited as Norman Field)
- George 'Buck' Flower as Rex Boorski
- Sandy Dempsey as Actress
- Con Covert as Make-Up Man
- Robyn Hilton as Inga
- Wayne Chapman as Actor
- Angela Carnon as Mrs. Gordon
- Cheryl Smith as 'Twinkle Twat' Girl
- George Peters as 'Twinkle Twat' Boy

== Reception ==
DVD Talk stated: "Video Vixens is a great deal of fun. It recalls an era when any mention of gratuity was greeted with simultaneous calls of censure and/or celebration. Nudity was just leaving the exploitation arena and taking up shop in the movie mainstream. Thanks to the efforts of Gross and Pachard, this skin flick ends up being a smart, sunny spoof of the growing morass between the different medias. It's not perfect, but it sure beats the pants off similar adult-oriented offerings".
