= Beware! Children at Play =

- Promotional release poster
- Directed by: Mik Cribben
- Written by: Fred Scharkey
- Produced by: Michael Koslow; Lawrence Littler; Linda Sanford; Ellen Wedner
- Starring: Michael Robertson; Rich Hamilton; Robin Lilly; Lori Tirgrath; Jamie Krause; Mik Cribben
- Cinematography: Mik Cribben
- Edited by: Mik Cribben
- Music by: Hershel Dwellingham
- Production company: Troma Entertainment
- Distributed by: Troma Entertainment
- Release date: November 24, 1989
- Running time: 94 minutes
- Country: United States
- Language: English

Beware! Children at Play (also known as Goblins, Caution! Kids Are Playing, Warning! Children and Attention! Enfants and originally styled as Beware: Children at Play) is a 1989 American independent slasher film directed by Mik Cribben and distributed by Troma Entertainment.

== Plot ==
A young boy plays with his father in the woods when his father is caught in a bear trap; he tells his son that eventually people will come and free him. After several days, he dies of the injury and orders the son to cannibalize his corpse after death, which the little boy proceeds to do.

Ten years later, parents John and Julia DeWolfe drive with their daughter Kara to visit their friends, the Carr family (Sheriff Ross, Cleo, and their daughter Mary-Rose) in New Jersey. Along the way, they are warned by bible salesman Franklin Ludwig about a series of disappearances in the area; when the DeWolfe family drives away, Ludwig is bisected by an unknown person with a scythe. Meanwhile, the wife of farmer Isaac Braun is killed after being lured outside. Mary-Rose, the remaining daughter of the Carr family (her sister Amy having disappeared several years before), disappears as well and a psychic is called in to find her. Later that day, Mary-Rose lures the psychic into the woods where a group of children slit her throat with a razor and cannibalize her body.

A mob forms after the body of the psychic is found and a reporter, Dale Hawthorne, visits the Braun farm to investigate. There he finds the corpse of Mrs. Braun before two children impale her upon a spiked plank of wood. Julia theorizes that the words she heard the kids chanting are linked to Beowulf and discovers that ten years ago, a professor with the surname Randall went camping with his son Glenn before disappearing. Julia finds several children in Kara's room and is killed by them; Cleo attempts to fight them off but is knocked out by Glenn (now known as Grendel). John is ambushed by children but fights them off - realizing that the kidnapped daughter of the Carr family, Amy, now believes herself to be Grendel (Glenn)'s wife. Sheriff Carr arrives but is attacked and stabbed to death by the children.

John forces Amy to lead him to the children's compound in order to find Kara. When they arrive, he watches as Cleo is stabbed by Grendel, who then pulls her heart out. An angry mob, led by the new sheriff Luke, arrive; when John attempts to stop them, he is shot directly in the forehead by Isaac with a shotgun, killing him. The adults open fire on the children, killing Grendel and Amy, before using several other weapons to brutally massacre the remaining children. After the adults leave, Kara is revealed to have been hiding beneath John's body and is also revealed to have been brainwashed as well. She prepares to kill a rabbit and lets out a demonic growl.

== Cast ==
- Michael Robertson as John DeWolfe
- Rich Hamilton as Ross Carr
- Robin Lilly as Cleo Carr
- Lori Romero as Julia DeWolfe (credited as Lori Tilgrath)
- Jamie Krause as Kara DeWolfe
- Mik Cribben as Isac Braun

== Controversy ==
The film is one of Troma's most controversial titles due to its gruesome finale, a sequence in which the townspeople brutally murder each of the cannibalistic children using firearms, pitchforks, and other assorted weapons. According to Lloyd Kaufman, when the film's trailer played at the Cannes Film Festival before a screening of Tromeo and Juliet, nearly half of the theatre walked out in protest.

== See also ==
- Who Can Kill a Child? – a 1976 Spanish horror film
- Children of the Corn (film series)
