= East End Hustle =

- Film poster
- Directed by: Frank Vitale
- Written by: Allan Moyle; Frank Vitale
- Produced by: Don Carmody; Frank Vitale
- Starring: Andrée Pelletier; Margaret Ann Bates; Louis DiBianco; Sheila Mufford; Julia Plummer
- Cinematography: Ivar Rushevic
- Edited by: Patrick Dodd
- Music by: Len Blum
- Distributed by: Cinépix
- Release date: September 17, 1976 (Quebec)
- Running time: 91 minutes
- Country: Canada
- Language: English

East End Hustle is a 1976 crime drama film directed by Frank Vitale and distributed by Troma Entertainment. The film stars Andrée Pelletier.

== Premise ==
The plot concerns a high-priced prostitute who leads a rebellion of hookers against their sadistic pimps.

== Production ==
East End Hustle was developed under the name Cindy.

== Release ==
East End Hustle was shown in Montreal Canada on September 17, 1976.

== Reception ==
DVD Talk commented: "So when one reads the plot synopsis for the 1976 Canadian 'classic' East End Hustle - an ex-hooker, sick of the rackets, grabs a gun and gets revenge – one's cinematic shorthairs get all hot and tingly. The notion of harlots mixed with homicide is so sublimely sleazy, so nicely Neanderthal-ish that it can't be anything but an outright smash, right? Sadly, Troma's DVD release of this tantalizing title only proves one thing: you can't judge a carnal crime film by its premise."
