= Decampitated =

- DVD cover
- Directed by: Matt Cunningham
- Written by: Matt Cunningham; Ryan Lowery; Carolyn Miller; Brian Walters
- Produced by: Matt Cunningham; Ryan Lowery
- Starring: Mike Hart; Jonathon Scott; Thomas Martwick; Steve Ladden; Cristina Patterson Ceret
- Cinematography: Kenny Carmack
- Edited by: Michael Berkowitz
- Production company: Sneaky Pig
- Distributed by: Troma Entertainment
- Release date: 1998
- Running time: 92 minutes
- Language: English
- Budget: $15,000

Decampitated is a 1998 independent American horror comedy film. It was directed by Matt Cunningham and stars Mike Hart, Jonathon Scott, Thomas Martwick, Steve Ladden, and Cristina Patterson Ceret. It was given a limited release in theaters and distributed on video by Troma Entertainment. Decampitated was filmed in Colorado, and finishing funds were provided by Troma Entertainment.

== Plot ==
After doing business with a strange travel agent, a group of teenagers, Vince, Candace, Paige, Garret, Toby, April and Roger, head out for a cabin in the Colorado woods. They accidentally crash their car while driving to the cabin, so, while the rest of the group set up the camping equipment, Vince leaves to attempt to locate the cabin. He instead finds the residence of a transvestite, Jake. Jake takes Vince captive. Meanwhile, Garret tells the group of the legend of psycho killer Miles DeCamp, and later that night, Toby's throat is slit. He survives after the group cover his wounds with duct tape, but the next day, the murderer attacks April, hacking off her arm, and impales Roger.

The survivors walk to Jake's residence. While they are there, Jake is attacked by being shot with an arrow. The rest of the group escape to the cabin, along the way finding April, who has survived the attack by sewing her arm back on. Next, Roger, who survived his impalement, shows up. The next morning, Toby's head is torn off, and the killer turns out to be Miles, who is also the strange travel agent the group met earlier in the film. Miles is about to kill Vince when he is shot by Jake, who has survived the arrow, Vince screams at the sight of Jake and the film ends.

== Cast ==
- Amy Gordon as Candace
- Mike Hart as Garrett
- Steve Ladden as Toby
- Wayne Larson as Myles DeCamp
- Bethany La Voo as Paige
- Ryan Lowery as Jake
- Thomas Martwick as Roger
- Crista Patterson as April
- Deus Xavier Scott as Vince
- Jack D'Amore as Tattoo artist
- John Fugelsang as Phone Voice Specialist

== Reception ==
Bill Gibron, writing for DVD Verdict, gave a positive review of Decampitated, calling it a "fine, flawed film". He criticized the length of the film, saying it would have worked better as a short subject, and also reserved special criticism for the DVD's lack of special features. A TV Guide review gave the film 1 1/2 stars, criticizing the fact that the film was not funny enough to be a horror comedy.

Decampitated was listed as a "not so fabulous Colorado movie", with Jon de Vos saying: "Why is America's youth so dumb as to seek shelter in a creepy old cabin when their car breaks down in the woods? Why do survivors never flee when the first half of their party is chainsawed into burger bits?"

== Soundtrack ==
Decampitated's soundtrack was released by Glue Factory on December 8, 1998. It features 10 songs, including music from H_{2}O, Strife, Coalesce and Hatebreed.

== Release ==
After briefly being shown in theaters in 1998, Decampitated was released on VHS by Troma Entertainment on December 7, 1999. It was re-released on DVD by Troma Entertainment on August 5, 2003.
