= Frostbiter: Wrath of the Wendigo =

- Directed by: Tom Chaney
- Written by: Tom Chaney
- Produced by: Tom Chaney; Bill Siemers; David Thiry
- Starring: Ron Asheton; Lori Baker; Devlin Burton; John Bussard; Patrick Butler; Alan Madlane
- Cinematography: Tom Chaney
- Edited by: Tom Chaney; Kaye Davis
- Music by: Steve Quick
- Distributed by: Troma Entertainment
- Release date: 1995
- Running time: 98 minutes
- Country: United States
- Language: English
- Budget: $125,000

Frostbiter: Wrath of the Wendigo, is an independent comedy horror film, filmed sometime in 1988 but released in 1995 by Troma Entertainment. One of the stars, Ron Asheton, was the guitarist for The Stooges.

== Synopsis ==
Two friends go hunting in the woods of Northern Michigan. While wandering the woods, they accidentally break a sacred circle, releasing a terrible monster: the Wendigo. The Wendigo goes on a terrible killing spree, leaving a gun-toting hero and his female love-interest to destroy the monster.

== Details ==
The film owes a large debt to Sam Raimi's Evil Dead films with its mix of horror and comedy, in fact featuring a torn Evil Dead II poster in much the same way The Evil Dead features a torn The Hills Have Eyes poster. The film also gives "special thanks" to Bruce Campbell, the star of the Evil Dead films. This connection was reinforced in Japan, where the movie was released on video under the misleading title Shiryōnoharawata Sai Tsui Shō. Since the Japanese title of Evil Dead is Shiryōnoharawata, the distributors obviously tried to cash in on the success of Raimi's trilogy. Also, the Japanese videocassette box puts the emphasis on a creature with a skull's head, reminiscent of the original Evil Dead II poster.

At one part of the film, footage from Frank Capra's It's a Wonderful Life, with some scenes in the film claiming to take place in Bedford Falls, much like the Christmas classic.

The film was filmed primarily in southeast Michigan, in particular on a hunting cabin set built inside an old schoolhouse in Tecumseh.

== Production ==
Tom Chaney at the age of 25 wrote, directed and produced the film under the title of Wendigo investing $17,500 of his own money in the production. Due to the limited budget, Chaney placed undeveloped film in his home freezer until Kodak volunteered to develop it on a “pay as you go” plan. Filming took place in various areas around Michigan such as Dearborn, Dexter, Livonia, Tecumseh, and Houghton Lake with Chaney using a neighbor's backyard to dig the Wendigo's Hell hole. Gary Jones who'd provided the effects work for Moontrap worked on the film's special effects.

== Reception ==
The film was noted for its special effects.
