= Igor and the Lunatics =

1985 film

- European VHS cover
- Directed by: Billy Parolini
- Written by: Jocelyn Beard; Billy Parolini
- Produced by: Jocelyn Beard; Billy Parolini
- Starring: Joseph Eero; Mary Ann Schact; Joe Niola; T.J. Glenn; Joan Ellen Delaney
- Cinematography: John Raugalis
- Edited by: Billy Parolini
- Music by: Sonia Rutstein
- Distributed by: Troma Entertainment
- Release date: 1985
- Running time: 80 minutes
- Country: United States
- Language: English

Igor and the Lunatics is a 1985 slasher film directed by Billy Parolini and distributed by Troma Entertainment. The film follows Paul, a maniacal cult leader, and his group of murderous followers, Igor and Bernard, who, after being sent to prison after a killing spree, are released sixteen years later, only to return to their killings.

== Production ==
The movie was financed by Troma Entertainment who were so unhappy with the final product that they did extensive reshoots and re-editing to add more gore and more action into the film. The final version of the film has numerous co-directors credited, one specifically for action and gore scenes.

The movie did become a cult-classic and a staple of the Troma library. T.J. Glenn who worked on the film both as an actor and stunt person would go on to work on numerous other Troma titles - most famously; Citizen Toxie: The Toxic Avenger IV.
