= They Call Me Macho Woman! =

- Theatrical poster
- Directed by: Patrick G. Donahue
- Written by: Patrick G. Donahue
- Produced by: Dee Donahue; Patrick G. Donahue; Newman Goldstein
- Starring: Debra Sweaney; Brian Oldfield; Sean P. Donahue; Mike Donahue; Jerry Johnson
- Cinematography: Mike Pierce
- Edited by: Jules Shapiro
- Music by: Emilio Kauderer
- Distributed by: Troma Entertainment
- Release date: 1989
- Running time: 81 minutes
- Country: United States
- Language: English

They Call Me Macho Woman! is a 1989 action film written and directed by Patrick G. Donahue and distributed by Troma Entertainment. The film belongs to the girls with guns subgenre.

== Plot ==
The story follows city woman Susan Morris (Debra Sweaney), who decides to escape her banal urban life and goes looking for a house in the country. Unfortunately, she's taken prisoner by a group of savage drug smugglers, headed by the ruthless Mongo (Brian Oldfield). After escaping their clutches, Susan is forced to transform herself into a fearsome warrior and exact her revenge on Mongo and his evil henchmen.

=== Tagline ===
"Born to shop...she learned to kill!"

== Production ==
A lot of the original music in this film became trademark Troma songs and were used in a variety of films, including the Toxic Avenger sequels.

== Reception ==
TV Guide sees in the film a "Troma thriller (a whole genre of humorously sub-"B" movies)".

The website Girls With Guns said of the film: "Yes, it’s dumb. Yes, it’s cheap. Yes, it makes little or no sense, in particular her sudden transformation from plucky but largely ineffective heroine [who can’t even stab someone in a way that causes them more than moderate discomfort] into a warrior woman, capable of embedding a shiny axe in your head from 15 paces. But, you know what? It’s never boring (...)"
