= Lucker the Necrophagus =

Lucker the Necrophagous
- Theatrical poster
- Directed by: Johan Vandewoestijne
- Written by: Johan Vandewoestijne
- Screenplay by: John Kupferschmidt; Johan Vandewoestijne
- Story by: Johan Vandewoestijne
- Produced by: Flip Beys; André Coppens; Johan Vandewoestijne
- Starring: Nick Van Suyt
- Cinematography: John Kupferschmidt
- Edited by: Johan Vandewoestijne
- Music by: Marc Ickx; Patrick Xosmox
- Production companies: V.D.S. Films; Desert Productions
- Distributed by: VDS Video; BDM Distribution
- Release date: 1986 (Belgium)
- Running time: 74 minutes 68 minutes (Director's Cut)
- Country: Belgium
- Language: English
- Budget: BEF 30,000

Lucker the Necrophagous is a 1986 horror film written and directed by Johan Vandewoestijne, and co-written by John Kupferschmidt.

== Plot ==
John Lucker, a psychotic man who killed and raped the bodies of eight women, falls into a coma after trying to slit his own throat while being moved from one mental institution to another. Lucker is placed in a private clinic where he awakens, murders an orderly and takes the man's clothes. Lucker exits the clinic and hijacks the orderly's car after killing the man's girlfriend and having sex with her body.

The next morning, Lucker listens to a radio broadcast discussing his escape, and Cathy Jordan, a survivor of Lucker three years ago. Lucker abandons his stolen car and walks into town while having flashbacks to his time with Cathy, which excite him to the point of prompting him to disembowel a female jogger in a parking garage.

Using a public phonebook and map, Lucker pinpoints Cathy's current address, which he gains entry to by soliciting a prostitute who lives there. Once in the building, Lucker shackles the hooker to her bed, stabs her in the throat and takes up residence in her apartment, which he spies on Cathy from.

A month later, Lucker has sex with her severely decomposed corpse, cuts it up, places the pieces in garbage bags and goes to throw them out. On the way out, Lucker runs into Cathy's boyfriend whom he strangles and bludgeons while two women, Carolyn and Sharon, enter the building to visit the prostitute. After disposing of Carolyn and capturing Sharon, Lucker goes to Cathy's apartment and captures her as well.

While Lucker rants and thrashes about, he guts Sharon in front of Cathy, who escapes her binds and stabs Lucker in the back with his own knife. The wounded Lucker pursues Cathy throughout the building and is seemingly killed when Cathy pushes him down an elevator shaft. However, as the credits roll, a fully recovered Lucker is shown leaving the building.

== Cast ==
- Nick Van Suyt as John Lucker
- Helga Vandevelde as Cathy Jordan
- Carry Van Middel as Nurse
- Frank Van Laecke as Bobby
- Let Jodts as Hooker
- Freek Neirynck as Bartender
- Martine Scherre as Girl in Jogging
- Tony Castillo as Dealer
- John Edwards as Boyfriend

== DVD release ==
The film was released on DVD by Synapse Films in 2008, and contained the original 74 minute version of the film, a new 68 minute Director's Cut, and a featurette entitled Lucker: The Story Behind the Film. In 2019, TetroVideo released a 72 minutes French version for the first time on DVD.

== Reception ==
Bloodtype Online praised Nick Van Suyt's performance and the soundtrack, and called the film "repulsive and groundbreaking" despite its simplicity. That website awarded the film a two and a half, as did Brutal as Hell, which described Lucker as "one of the most sickening, grotesque, and disturbing films in the history of horror" despite the weak story.

The Worldwide Celluloid Massacre referred to Lucker as a "boring sick movie" and categorized it as "Worthless". A two out of seven was given by Independent Flicks, which criticized the acting, camerawork, and editing, and stated that overall the film was amateurish, boring and poorly done.
