= Return to Return to Nuke 'Em High AKA Volume 2 =

2017 American science-fiction horror comedy film by Lloyd Kaufman

- Official release poster
- Directed by: Lloyd Kaufman
- Written by: Travis Campbell; Derek Dressler; Lloyd Kaufman; Gabriel Friedman; Doug Sakmann (additional material)
- Produced by: Lloyd Kaufman; Michael Herz
- Starring: Asta Paredes; Catherine Corcoran; Zac Amico; Vito Trigo; Lloyd Kaufman; Lemmy
- Cinematography: Justin Duval
- Edited by: Travis Campbell
- Production company: Troma Entertainment
- Distributed by: FilmRise
- Release dates: May 24, 2017 (Cannes Film Festival); November 29, 2019 (North America)
- Running time: 85 minutes
- Country: United States
- Language: English

Return to Return to Nuke 'Em High AKA Volume 2 is a 2017 American science fiction comedy horror film, made by the cult classic B-movie production group Troma Entertainment. It is directed by Troma co-founder Lloyd Kaufman and is the fifth in the Nuke 'Em High film series.

== Plot ==
After being sent to the principal's office in the previous film, Chrissy Goldberg is blackmailed by Principal Westley, who shows her the video that Zac took of her and Lauren kissing and threatens to air it on TV if Chrissy doesn't delete her blog. Meanwhile, Lauren gives birth to a duck/human hybrid in the gym locker room, explaining to Chrissy that she was impregnated when her pet duck, Kevin, was shoved down her throat. Chrissy and Lauren steal Zac's clothes as revenge for him betraying Chrissy to the principal, causing him to declare war on both of them when he's accepted into the Cretins. Chrissy reveals the blackmail to Lauren, who urges Chrissy to delete her blog to keep them both safe.

The next morning, Chrissy's Aunt Bee and science teacher, Mr. Chip, tell Chrissy that she is the daughter of Chrissy and Warren from the first Class of Nuke 'Em High, and that Warren grew up to become Lee Harvey Herzkauf. Herzkauf is plotting with the President of the United States to serve the toxic tacos in every school in the world, revealing that he's using the flatulence gas of the Tromaville High Students to keep himself young. Kevin is thrown into a vat of toxic waste, where he mutates into a hulking duck monster.

When reporters show up at the house to question Chrissy about her blog, Lauren decides to come out to them as a lesbian couple so Chrissy can keep fighting against Herzkauf. The Cretins break into Chrissy's house and kidnap Lauren and the baby. They drive them to the school and start to shoot it up. Herzkauf starts mutating as a result of running out of gas from the captured students and runs into the school at the same time looking for more, turning into a monster and slaughtering dozens of students. Chrissy, Slater, and Kelly go into the school to look for Lauren, finding her tied up in a classroom but are immediately captured and taunted by Zac and the other Cretins, who threaten to sexually assault them. Kevin busts in and murders Zac. The other Cretins run off with the baby, with Kevin giving chase, and Slater is killed when he jumps on a grenade that the Cretins threw into the room. Chrissy makes an attempt to reach out to the fully mutated Herzkauf, but after Herzkauf kills Kelly decides that he has to die. Lauren grabs Mr. Chip's laser, accidentally fires into the sky, killing God, before she and Chrissy kiss and fire off the laser together, finally finishing off Herzkauf. The school explodes; Chrissy gives a speech to the surviving students that the time of hate and homophobia is over, and Kevin comes out of the wreckage and returns the baby to Lauren. Despite Lauren urging Kevin to stay with them, he says goodbye and blows both himself and Principal Westley up as Westley tries to flee the town. Lauren and Chrissy get married in a private ceremony under a rainbow.

== Cast ==
- Asta Paredes as Chrissy
- Catherine Corcoran as Lauren
- Vito Trigo as Leonardo
- Clay von Carlowitz as Eugene
- Zac Amico as Zac
- Lemmy as The President
- Lloyd Kaufman as Lee Harvey Herzkauf
- Ron Jeremy as God
- Monique Dupree as Shower Girl
- Nadia White as Lacey
- James Rolfe as The Angry Video Game Nerd (Cameo)

== Production ==
A majority of the fifth film was shot concurrently with the fourth film, Return to Nuke 'Em High Volume 1. Principal photography began in August 2012 and finished in September 2012. However, the film suffered an extended post-production period. In June 2015, Troma launched a crowdfunding campaign and raised $63,615 for post-production costs.

== Release ==
The sequel premiered at the Cannes Film Festival in May 2017 with some slight controversy as Kaufman stated Troma employees were "slapped around and arrested by thugs in suits joined by police" while promoting the film. The film had its American debut with a Los Angeles premiere on March 8, 2018 at the Ahrya Fine Arts Theater in Beverly Hills, California.

Prior to its home video debut, Troma allowed fans a three-day digital rental of the movie online for $4.99 in February 2019. The movie released on Blu-ray on November 12, 2019.

== Reception ==
Reviews were generally positive with nearly all noting the film's various excesses. Writing of the 2017 Cannes premiere, Simon Abrams of RogerEbert.com said "Kaufman delivers everything exploitation fans want: full frontal nudity, duck rape, mutant monsters, oodles of blood and gore, a fat man with a Prince Albert genital piercing, and more" and that this film "might be Kaufman's angriest polemic yet, and it's consequently his looniest." Katie Walsh of The Los Angeles Times stated one had to admire "Kaufman for staying so committed to sensational, offensive exploitation filmmaking." Film Threat gave the film 4 out of 5 stars and called it "Troma’s most manic magnum opus yet" that could be considered "the all too meta, fourth wall breaking, asylum wall destroying amalgamation of everything Kaufman has been working towards in his career." Glenn Kenny of The New York Times called the film a "putrid but at times oddly amiable exercise" that "offers a relentless barrage of toilet humor, haphazard film parodies and gore effects that are no less repellent for being unconvincing."
