= When Nature Calls =

- Directed by: Charles Kaufman
- Written by: Charles Kaufman; Straw Weisman
- Produced by: Charles Kaufman; Susan P. Thomases; Frank Vitale
- Starring: David Orange; Barbara Marineau; Nicky Beim; Tina Marie Staiano; David Strathairn; Willie Mays; G. Gordon Liddy; Myron Cohen; Fred Blassie; Stanley Siegel; Morey Amsterdam; John Cameron Swayze
- Cinematography: Mike Spera
- Edited by: Michael Jacobi
- Music by: Arthur Custer
- Production companies: Mach Studios, Inc. Vitale Films; Cox Productions
- Distributed by: Troma Entertainment
- Release date: September 13, 1985
- Running time: 88 minutes
- Language: English

When Nature Calls is a 1985 spoof comedy written and directed by Charles Kaufman and starring Academy Award nominee David Strathairn in an early performance. The film was distributed by Charles Kaufman's brother, Lloyd Kaufman, of Troma Entertainment (sister Susan Kaufman worked as an art director and their father Stanley appeared as an actor in the film).

== Content ==
The film is packed with visual gags, non sequiturs, fake previews for non-existent movies, and, one of the film's more notable sequences, an obscene stop-motion montage involving food products. The (loose) plot of the film follows a man (David Orange) who, fed up with the hassles of city living, decides to move his reluctant family into the woods, only to find out that they're in way over their heads with outdoor living. The video box proudly claims that the film includes the most romantic scene between a woman and a bear shot on celluloid.

== Cast ==
The film features cameos from such notable people as baseball legend Willie Mays, professional wrestler Fred Blassie, comedian Morey Amsterdam, and Watergate icon G. Gordon Liddy. It also features appearances from Gates McFadden, William Smith, James Eckhouse, Billy Beck, Susan Pratt, and Jerome Preston Bates.

== Reception ==
Troma boasts When Nature Calls as one of the company's best comedies. The response from Troma fans has been largely positive as well, with most comparing it to such early Troma comedy classics as The First Turn-On! and Squeeze Play!.

Reception
