= Cars 3 (2009 film) =

2009 action comedy film

- DVD cover
- Directed by: Bobby Hacker
- Written by: Bobby Hacker
- Based on: Cars series by Bobby Hacker
- Produced by: Richard Bain; Tyler Scott Jones
- Starring: Travis Jones; Richard Bain; Tyler Jones; Bruce Boyman
- Edited by: Bobby Hacker
- Production company: United Filmmakers
- Distributed by: Troma Entertainment
- Release date: January 26, 2009 (Tromadance Film Festival)
- Country: United States
- Language: English

Cars 3 is a 2009 action comedy film directed by Bobby Hacker. It is based on Hacker's series of comedy videos entitled Cars, which gained popularity after being posted to the comedy video website Funny or Die.

== Plot ==
Tim is a used car salesman who uses profanity and antagonizes people into purchasing his cars. After making a deal with the devil, Tim finds himself with only an hour to sell a car, but his plan to do so spins out of control when he murders the wife of a customer, who swears revenge. Danger.

== Production ==
Based on his popular Cars sketches, Bobby Hacker filmed Cars 3 during the span of one month in 2008. Hacker shot Cars 3 quickly, so he could enter it in the Sundance Film Festival.

The film's dialogue and plot were improvised by the actors. Unlike the Cars shorts, which run for roughly two minutes, Cars 3 has a running time of 38 minutes.

== Reception ==
Patrick Bromley, writing for DVD Verdict, said while there was an audience for Hacker's brand of humor, he found it to be overly loud and obnoxious, and compared it to Tim and Eric Awesome Show, Great Job! "minus the cleverness and satire." Kyle Regan, writing for The Stranger, wrote that "Cars 3 never aims for subtlety, not that it necessarily needs it. But in a movie far longer than the average internet video sensation, the ADD-riddled plot turns, jokes, and gags dragged."

Courtney Ferguson, writing for The Portland Mercury, said, "I wasn't sorry Cars III was so stupid. I loved how stupid Cars III was. It’s a glorious melange of yelling, nunchucks, lasers, gunfights, dead burned lesbians, and blood-spurting belly buttons."

== Release ==
The day after shooting finished, Cars 3 premiered at the New Beverly Theater. The premiere was hosted by comedian Patton Oswalt. It was later released on DVD in 2009 by Troma Entertainment. Special features include the other films in the Cars series and trailers for other Troma films.
