= Dog Years (1997 film) =

1997 film

- Directed by: Robert Loomis
- Written by: Robert Loomis
- Produced by: Cecilia M. Flamme; Robert Loomis
- Starring: R. Michael Caincross; Veronica Loomis; John Aguiar; Shawn Smith; Damon Gregory
- Edited by: Robert Loomis
- Music by: Dave's Big Deluxe
- Distributed by: Troma Entertainment
- Release date: 1997
- Running time: 99 minutes
- Country: United States
- Language: English

Dog Years is a 1997 action comedy film directed by Robert Loomis and distributed by Troma Entertainment.

It was filmed entirely in Arizona and featured music by Arizona ska band Dave's Big Deluxe. Dog Years was well received by film critics. Variety compared the film to the early works of Jim Jarmusch and Hal Hartley, and the film won two awards at the 1998 Arizona International Film Festival for 'Most Popular Indie Film' and 'Best of Arizona'. Additionally, Dog Years played at the 1998 South by Southwest film festival.

In 2003, Robert Loomis directed Angry Young Man, the sequel to Dog Years, once again starring R. Michael Caincross.

== Plot ==
The film revolves around the lonely Wally, a Trojan skinhead whose only friend is his beloved Dalmatian Neechee. One day while walking her, Wally accidentally becomes involved with a strange deal gone bad when he bumps into a fleeing stranger being chased by a group of mob thugs. When he gets tangled up in Neechee's leash and frantically kicks the dog, Wally proceeds to beat him up and gets arrested by passing police officers. The dealer gets away and Wally spends a night in jail.

Upon being released, he learns that his dog has been kidnapped by the mob thugs, who are convinced Wally's holding the drugs that have been taken from them. Although he quickly proves that he's innocent, the mob's still not letting him off that easily: either he'll have to do some work for them, or both he and the dog are dead. Reluctantly, Wally agrees to run some illegal errands. When the errands are a bust and he's almost arrested, Wally flees and the mob puts a hit on both him and Neechee (who has managed to escape from the criminals' hideout). Enlisting the help of a young veterinarian, Wally attains an arsenal of firearms and is ready to exact his revenge on the ruthless kingpins. All he wants is his dog back.
