= Héctor Echavarría =

Argentine martial artist and actor

Hector Echavarria
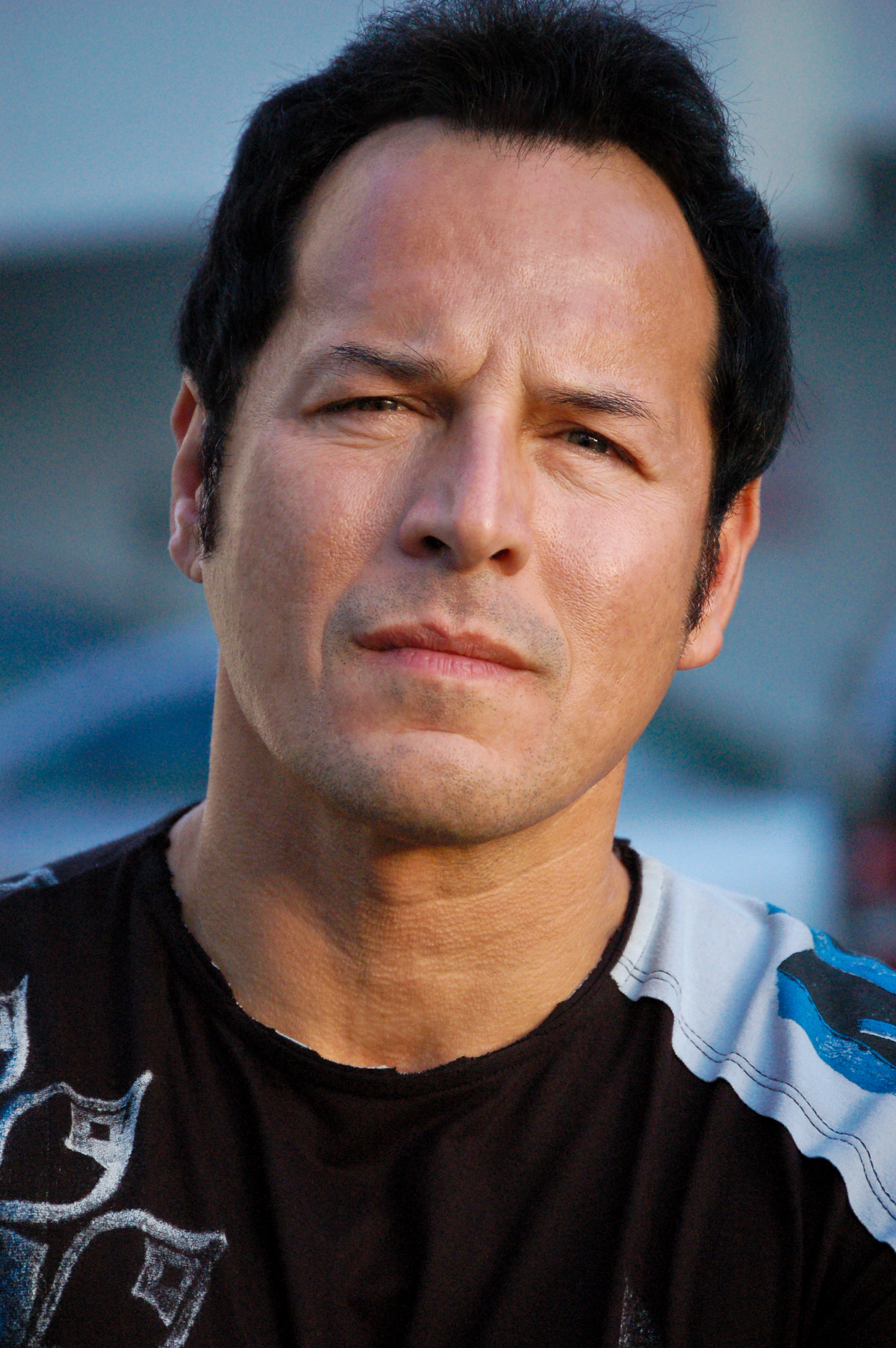
- Echavarría in 2011
- Born: Héctor E. Echavarría; December 6, 1969 (age 56); Corrientes, Argentina
- Rank: 6th dan black belt in Shury-ryu Karate; 10th dan black belt in Kenpo Karate; 5th dan camoflauge belt in Taekwondo; 13th dan black belt in Jujitsu; Orange belt in Judo

Other information
- Occupation: Actor; film director; screenwriter; producer; martial artist

Héctor Echavarría (born December 6, 1969) is an Argentine actor, filmmaker, and martial artist.

== Biography ==
=== Early life ===
Héctor Echavarría was born in Corrientes, the capital city of the northern province of Corrientes, in his native Argentina. As an adult, he won fights against opponents in Corrientes, Argentina and moved his skills into the ring. He made his acting debut in the Latin American television series Brigada, based on the three-film series Los Exterminators.

Echavarria, who is a 28 times kick-boxing world champion, was inducted into the United States Martial Arts Hall of Fame in 2000. He was also named the "Full Contact Fighter of the Year" in 2000 by Yellow Belt Magazine.

When he went to the United States he trained and struggled under the guidance of Grand Master Robert Trias. Eventually, Ed Parker, who was Elvis Presley's bodyguard and the man who put Bruce Lee in movies, discovered Echavarria, who was known for having showmanship instead of fighting skills in the ring.

=== Fighting career ===
Echavarria began his martial arts training at age 4 and his competitive martial arts career at the age of 17 in his native country of Argentina.

Echavarria was chosen Light Contact Fighter of the Year by the United States Martial Arts Hall of Fame. He also was chosen to represent and be the leader of the International Karate and Kickboxing Association and Joe Corley's Professional Karate Association for all Latin America.

In October 2013 he was the host to the first-ever Hector Echavarria's World Martial Arts Mix Martial Arts Championship and Expo in Buenos Aires Argentina, which was sanctioned by the TFA (Total Fighting Alliance).

=== Film career ===
After a chance meeting with Miami Vice publicist Carole Myers, Echavarria was asked if he would want to become an actor. Myers obtained a television audition for him, and Hector appeared in the 1989 season premiere of Miami Vice: Down for the Count. A few years later, an Argentine producer saw Echavarria in a television demonstration and cast him in the action film Los Extermineitors. This film and its two sequels became the highest-grossing winter release movies in South America. Echavarria played a main character in the Argentine action comedy television series Brigada Cola along with fellow Los Extermineitors cast member and comedian Guillermo Francella, which ran in South America, Europe, and the Middle East from 1992 to 1997.

In April 2009, Echavarria filmed a feature called Death Warrior in Toronto, co-starring Nick Mancuso of Under Siege and Rapid Fire. It was produced by Sean Buckley of Buck Productions and directed by Bill Corcoran and distributed by Grindstone Entertainment Group and Lions Gate Entertainment towards the end of 2009.

Some of the projects he has in production include Justice for All, Kill the Dragon and others with distribution by Lionsgate. In 2010, Hector started production on Unrivaled in Toronto. He is credited as executive producer, writer as well as acting as "Ringo Duran," a "down-on-his-luck cage fighter" along with Rashad Evans and Keith Jardine.

Among many other features, Echavarria produced the horror film Lake Dead and Farm House starring "[Kelly Hu]", with theatrical distribution through After Dark Films. Later on, Hector produced and starred in Confessions of a Pit Fighter, distributed by Lionsgate. In 2008, he wrote, directed and starred as Diego Carter in the film Never Surrender, also distributed by Lionsgate.

He has helped start the film career of some of his friends, including Georges St-Pierre, B.J. Penn, Rashad Evans, Anderson Silva and Lyoto Machida. Echavarria is currently working with writer/producer Ronald Shusett in the development and the creation of a franchise project.

In 2013 Echavarria directed, wrote and starred in Chavez Cage of Glory with Danny Trejo, James Russo and Steven Bauer, which was produced and released theatrically by Destiny Entertainment Productions. In 2015 Hector filmed No Way Out, that will have him co-star again with Danny Trejo and actress-supermodel Estella Warren. No Way Out was released in 2018 and distributed by Sony Pictures. Echavarria is today producing and acting in big budget films and has a planned schedule for the next 10 years, including in-development films like Justice for All, Bloom with Keanu Reeves, Mounds of Clay with Olga Kurylenko, Run of a Hitman starring "Bruce Willis" and American Hostage with director John Moore producer Wyck Godfrey and Jerry Bruckheimer. In 2024 Echavarria raised a $400 million fund for his own Film studio Destiny Media Entertainment, and he aims to develop, produce and self-finance 15 feature films in the next five years.

== Filmography ==
=== Film ===
Year	Title	Role	Notes
1989	Los Extermineitors	Héctor	Film (released in Argentina)
1990	Extermineitors II: La venganza del dragón	Héctor	Film (released in Argentina)
1991	pExtermineitors III: La gran pelea final	Héctor	Film (released in Argentina)
1992	Fuerza máxima	Héctor	Video (released only in Argentina)
2001	Extreme Force	Marcos DeSantos	
2001	Los Bravos]p	Hector Riviera	Video (a.k.a. Los bravos/Los Bravos and Final Assault)
2003	Cradle 2 the Grave	Ultimate Fighter	
2005	Confessions of a Pit Fighter	Eddie Castillo	
2009	Never Surrender	Diego Carter	
2009	Hell's Chain]p	Robert Santos	
2009	Death Warrior	Reinero	
2010	Unrivaled	Ringo Duran	
2010	Death Calls	Gabriel	
2012	Revan	Daniel Del Toro	
2013	Chavez Cage of Glory	Hector Chavez	
2013	Duel of Legends	Dex	
2014	No Way Out	Del Toro	
2018	Justice For All	Miguel De Los Santos	

=== Television ===
Year	Title	Role	Notes
1987	Miami Vice	Batista	TV series - Episode: "Down for the Count: Part 1" (1987)
1992	Brigada cola	Hector	TV series (1992-1994)
2001	El gordo y la flaca	N/A	TV series - Episode dated August 28, 2001
