= Patrick Kilpatrick =

American screenwriter and producer

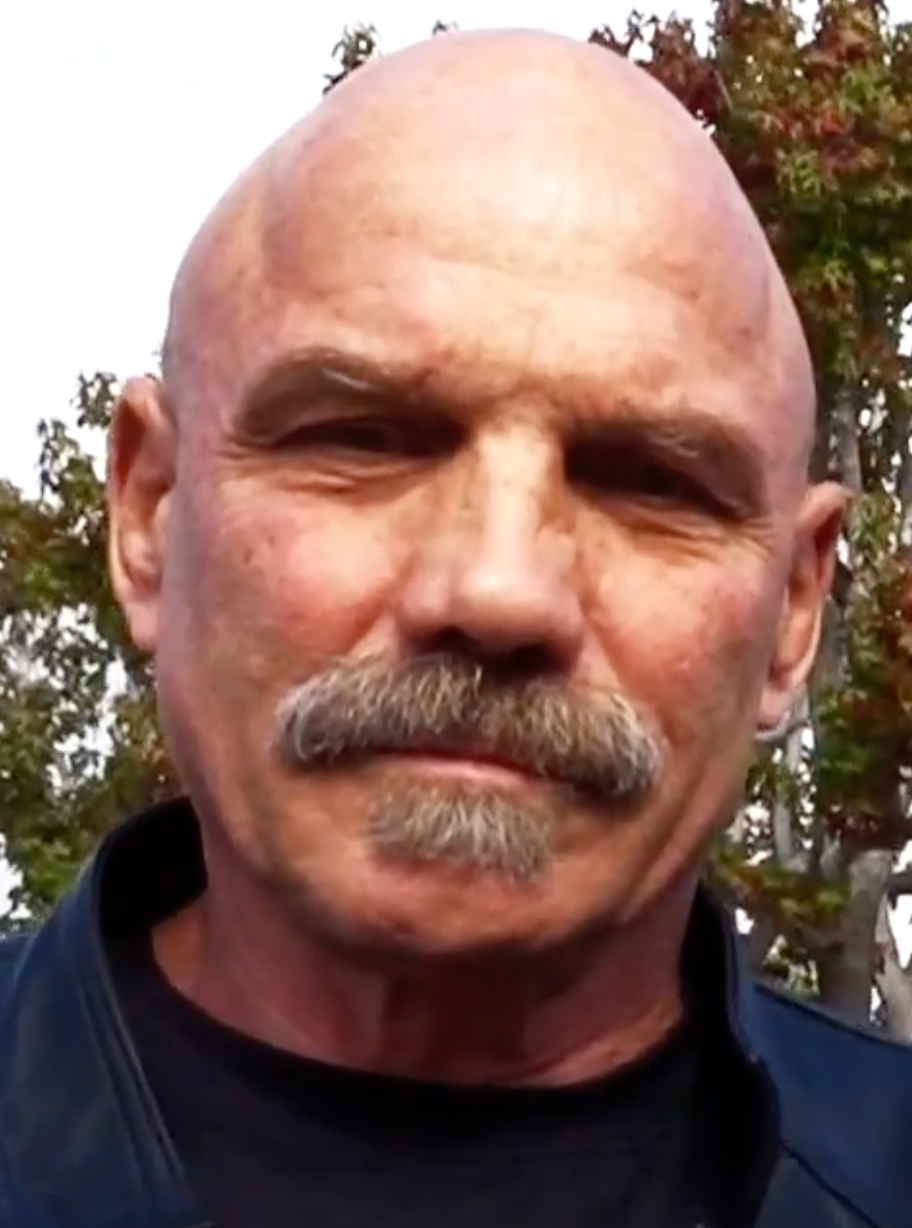
- Kilpatrick in 2018
- Born: Robert Donald Kilpatrick Jr. August 20, 1949 (age 77); Orange, Virginia, U.S.
- Education: University of Richmond (BA); New York University
- Occupations: Actor; film producer; journalist
- Years active: 1984–present
- Height: 6 ft 2 in (188 cm)
- Spouses: Marylyn Martin (m. 1973; div. 1974); Pnina Anza (m. 1978; div. 1979); Kerrie-Smith (m. 1986; div. 1996); Heidi Bright (m. 2021)
- Children: 2
- Website: www.patrickkilpatrick.com

Patrick Donald Kilpatrick Jr. (born August 20, 1949) is an American actor, film journalist and educator. He has appeared in over 200 films and television series.

== Early life ==
Kilpatrick was born in Orange, Virginia, the son of Robert Donald Kilpatrick Sr. and Ellie Faye (born Ellwood Fay) Hines Kilpatrick. His father was a World War II Beach Jumper, who received a Silver Star and Purple Heart in the Pacific.

When Kilpatrick was six, the family moved to Connecticut from Virginia, where his father (formerly a teacher) began his career in insurance underwriting. Kilpatrick Sr. was head of Connecticut General, and was a key figure in the merger that created the Cigna Corporation; he died on January 27, 1997, at age 72. His mother was a public school educator, coach, councilor and psychologist in private practice. The family bought property in Virginia in 1980. After nearly dying in a car crash at the age of 18 on November 17, 1967, he was rehabilitated to the point where he could later perform his own stunts.

Kilpatrick graduated from the University of Richmond in 1972 with a Bachelor of Arts degree in English, History, and Teaching and attended New York University's Professional Film and Television Graduate Program.

== Career ==
=== Film and television ===
His action-film villain appearances include Class of 1999 (1990), Showdown (1993), The Replacement Killers (1998), Eraser (1996), Last Man Standing (1996), Minority Report (2002), Under Siege 2: Dark Territory (1995), Death Warrant (1990), The Presidio (1988), and two Westerns opposite Tom Selleck, Last Stand at Saber River (1997) and Crossfire Trail (2001). Kilpatrick also starred in Free Willy 3: The Rescue (1997).

Other appearances include films such as Remo Williams: The Adventure Begins (1985); 3 Ninjas Knuckle Up (1995); and the PBS miniseries American Playhouse: Roanoak (1981), which became the largest production in the history of PBS.

Television appearances include Dark Angel; Lois & Clark: The New Adventures of Superman (1994); Walker, Texas Ranger (1994); Babylon 5 (1995); Dr. Quinn, Medicine Woman as Sergeant O'Connor for 9 episodes from 1996 to 1997; ER (1997); JAG (1997 & 2000); The X-Files (2001); General Hospital (2003); CSI: Crime Scene Investigation (2005); 24 (2005); Terminator: The Sarah Connor Chronicles (2008) and Chuck ("Chuck Versus the Gravitron"). He guess-starred in the Star Trek: Voyager episodes "Initiations" (1995) and "Drive" (2000) and in the Star Trek: Deep Space Nine episode "The Siege of AR-558" (1998).

=== Stage ===
Kilpatrick had a theatrical run at Los Angeles Theater Center for Shakespeare's Antony and Cleopatra, acted Off-Broadway in Hanoi Hilton at the Harold Clurman Theater (1984), Linda Her and The Fairy Garden (1984) at the Second Stage, and in regional theater, Requiem for a Heavyweight (1985).

He has directed Off-Broadway and was a founding member of Divine Theater in New York City. His play, Zone of Bells/Room of Seesaws, premiered at the 1984 East Village Arts Festival. He was assistant director on Broadway with The Golden Age (1984) and Entertaining Mr. Sloane, (1984, Cherry Lane Theatre), and on Death Trap (1984) in the West End of London.

=== Author ===
In 2018, Kilpatrick released a memoir, Dying for Living: Sins & Confessions of a Hollywood Villain & Libertine Patriot Vol. 1 – Upbringing, published by Boulevard Books (NYC) on October 1, 2018, launched October 3, 2018 at National Press Club and Kennedy Center for Performing Arts. The book received the "Best of LA" Award 2018 with 5-star reviews.

=== 2021 California gubernatorial recall election ===
In July 2021, Kilpatrick announced that he was running as a candidate in the 2021 California gubernatorial recall election as one of nine Democrats attempting to recall California's governor, Gavin Newsom. The 50% threshold to recall Newsom was not reached, and Kilpatrick received 1.2% of the replacement candidate vote. He is currently an independent.

== Filmography ==
=== Film ===
Year	Title	Role	Notes
1984	The Toxic Avenger	Leroy	
1985	Insignificance	Driver	
1985	Remo Williams: The Adventure Begins	Stone	
1987	Russkies	Raimy	
1988	The Presidio	Mark	
1989	The Cellar	Mance Cashen	
1990	Class of 1999	Mr. Bryles	
1990	Death Warrant	Christian "The Sandman" Naylor	
1993	Angel 4: Undercover	Hank	
1993	Best of the Best II	Finch	
1993	Showdown	Lee	
1994	Open Fire	Kruger	
1995	Scanner Cop II	Karl Volkin	
1995	3 Ninjas Knuckle Up	J.J.	
1995	The Granny	Father	
1995	Under Siege 2: Dark Territory	Mercenary	
1996	Beastmaster III: The Eye of Braxus	Jaggart	
1996	Eraser	Haggerty	
1996	Last Man Standing	Finn	
1996	Riot	Bryan O'Flaherty	
1997	Last Stand at Saber River	Austin Dodd	
1997	Free Willy 3: The Rescue	John Wesley	
1998	The Replacement Killers	Pryce	
1998	Hijack	Carl Howard	
1999	Palmer's Pick-Up	Bo	
2000	Luck of the Draw	Hit-Man	
2001	Crossfire Trail	Mike Taggart	
2001	The Substitute: Failure Is Not an Option	Colonel J.C. Brack	
2002	Minority Report	Officer Geoffrey Knott	
2003	Shotgun	Elmore	
2004	Gamebox 1.0	Ronald Hobbes / Ao Shun	
2005	Chasing Ghosts	Neil	
2007	Already Dead	The Detective	
2008	Parasomnia	Byron Volpe	
2009	Never Surrender	Seifer	
2009	The Confessional	Detective Mullens	
2012	The Zombinator	The Colonel	
2012	Wedding Day	Jeff	
2013	Chavez: Cage of Glory	John Stone	
2013	Jet Set	The Voice	
2014	Number Runner	Luke Eastman	
2014	7 Faces of Jack the Ripper	Edmund	
2015	The Wrath	Paul McKinley	
2015	No Way Out	Steve Johnson	
2016	Beyond the Game	Agent Johnsson	
2016	Assassin X	Claxton	
2016	DaZe: Vol. Too (sic) - NonSeNse	Dr. Rutherford B. Hogjaw Twaddle	
2017	Beyond the Shield	Thomas Schaffer	
2017	Borstal	Governor Heywood	
2017	American Violence	Charlie Rose	
2017	Cops and Robbers	Detective Miller	
2018	Black Water	Ferris	
2019	Night Walk	Louis	
2019	Beyond the Law	Terrance	
2022	When George Got Murdered	Deputy Warden	
2022	Borrowed Time III	Dr. Paul Harrison Wagner	
2022	Lie Hard	Mr. Reynolds	
2023	Hell's Coming for You	Clive Lewis	
2023	Nessie	Brad	

=== Television ===
Year	Title	Role	Notes
1984	The Edge of Night	Ken Bloom	14 episodes
1986	Tales from the Darkside	Dr. Philip Carrol	Episode: "Strange Love"
1986	American Playhouse	Amadas	Episode: "Roanoak: Part I"
1986	The Equalizer	Webster	Episode: "A Community of Civilized Men"
1987	The Quick and the Dead	Ute	TV film
1987	Cagney & Lacey	Eric	Episode: "Loves Me Not"
1988	Matlock	Prosecutor	Episode: "The Reunion"
1989	Something Is Out There	Bishop	Episode: "A Hearse of Another Color"
1989	Santa Barbara	Mickey James	4 episodes
1989–1990	Tour of Duty	Duke Fontaine	3 episodes
1994	The Stand	Ray Booth	1 episode
1994	Walker, Texas Ranger	Lyle Guthrie	Episode "Skyjacked"
1995	Babylon 5	Robert Carlson	Episode: "Convictions" Season 3#ep2
1996	Dr. Quinn, Medicine Woman	Sgt. O'Connor	8 episodes
1997	JAG	Kent	Episode: "Full Engagement"
1998	Star Trek: Deep Space Nine	Reese	Episode: "The Siege of AR-558"
2000	Charmed	Death, One of 4 Horsemen	Episode: "Apocalypse Not"
2000	JAG	Capt. Lyle	Episode: "Surface Warfare"
2001	The X-Files	Randall Cooper	Episode: "Surekill"
2003	Las Vegas	Louis Ambrose	Episode: "Decks and Violence"
2005	24	Secret Service Agent Dale Spalding	Episode: "Day 4: 6:00 AM - 7:00 AM"
2005	Criminal Minds	Vincent Perotta	Episode: "Natural Born Killer"
2007	Chuck	Leader	Episode: "Chuck Versus the Gravitron"
2008	Wanna Be Me!	John	TV film
2009	Cold Case	James "Monster" Drew '09	Episode: "Jackals"
2009	CSI: Miami	Tony Connor	Episode: "In Plane Sight"
2009	Nip/Tuck	Denny Kessler	Episode: "Alexis Stone II"
2012	Fighter's Chance	Referee	TV film
2012	Burn Notice	Dean Hunter	Episode: ""You Can Run"
2013	CSI: Crime Scene Investigation	Gary Lee Walt	Episode: "The Lost Reindeer"
2015	NCIS: Los Angeles	Dallas Adler	Episode: "Rage"
2016	NCIS: New Orleans	Gordan Bogdan	Episode: "Escape Plan"
2020	The Circuit	Sheriff Bob	Episode: "Ranch Terror"

=== Video games ===
Year	Title	Role	Notes
1999	Fleet Command	Captain Doug Matthews, USN Command Watch Officer	

== Awards and nominations ==
Year	Award	Category	Nominated work	Result
2019	Dreamachine International Film Festival	Lifetime Achievement Award		Won
2022	New York International Film Awards	Best Ensemble Cast (shared with Alan Delabie, Eric Roberts, Costas Mandylor, Matthias Hues, Christina Okolo, Mark Stas, Tessa Kassa, Merrick McCartha, Louis Mandylor)	Borrowed Time III	Won
2022	Actors Awards	Best ensemble (shared with Alan Delabie, Eric Roberts, Costas Mandylor, Matthias Hues, Christina Okolo, Mark Stas, Tessa Kassa, Merrick McCartha, Louis Mandylor)	Borrowed Time III	Won
2022	Actors Awards	Best villain	Borrowed Time III	Won
2022	Annual Actors Award	Best Ensemble of the Year (shared with Alan Delabie, (Eric Roberts, Costas Mandylor, Matthias Hues)	Borrowed Time III	Nominated
2022	Vegas Movie Awards	Best ensemble (shared with Alan Delabie, Eric Roberts, Costas Mandylor, Matthias Hues, Christina Okolo, Mark Stas, Tessa Kassa, Merrick McCartha, Louis Mandylor)	Borrowed Time III	Won
2022	New Jersey Film Awards	Best Supporting Actor	Borrowed Time III	Won
2022	DTLA Film Festival	Best ensemble Cast (shared with David Bianchi, Joni Bovil, Darin Cooper, Steve Eastin, Noel Gugliemi, Umar Khan, Melanie Liburd, Jermaine Love, Enrico Natale, Michael Roark)	Catalyst	Won
