= Tamarat Makonnen =

American film director

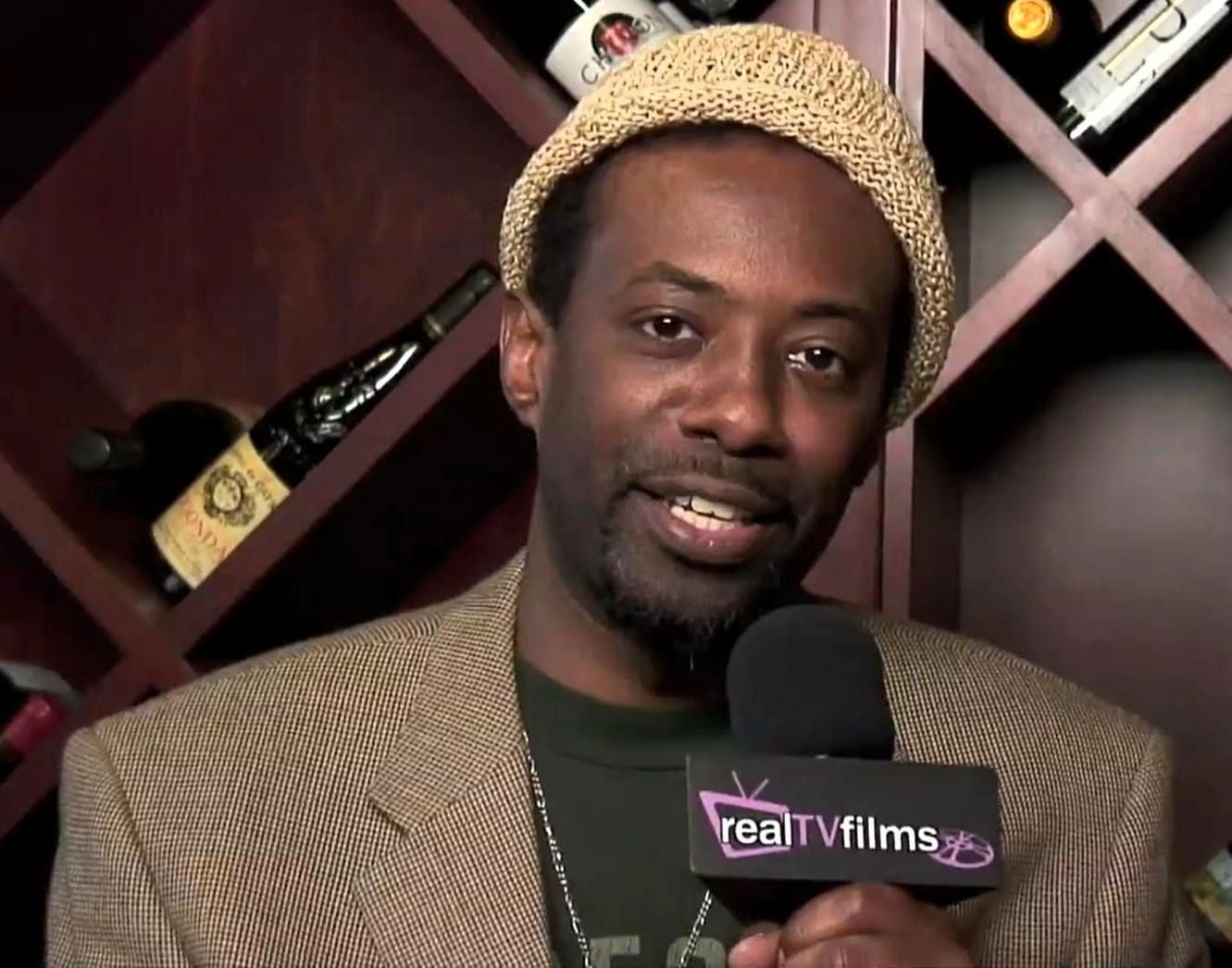
- Makonnen in 2009
- Born: March 16, 1972 (age 54)
- Occupations: Director, producer, screenwriter
- Years active: 1997–present

Tamarat Makonnen (born March 16, 1972, San Francisco, California) is an American film director, producer and writer. A graduate of Virginia Union University, he received his degree in English Language Arts. The native New Yorker began his professional career directing music videos. His first music video "The Beginning of the End" was for EMI recording artists Boogiemonsters. The New World Order inspired music video displayed a dark society where those who opposed the new government were detained for scientific experiments and tracked with barcodes in their hands. The video led to Makonnen creating music videos and electronic press kits (EPK) for an array of artists including: R&B singer Ne-Yo, Tupac Shakur collaborator C-Bo and political hip hop duo dead prez.

Makonnen has directed several music videos for dead prez, including the controversial "They Schools", a blistering indictment of the nation's deteriorating school system. At the time of its release, the video was banned from national video outlets due to its arresting imagery and subject matter. The video and its subsequent ban have since been discussed in several books including, Stand & Deliver: Political Activism, Leadership, and Hip Hop Culture by Yvonne Bynoe; Race and Resistance: African Americans in the 21st Century by Herb Boyd; and Rap Music and Culture by Kate Burns. Makonnen followed up "They Schools" with a second dead prez video, the critically acclaimed "Mind Sex". The song and video featured spoken word pioneer Abiodun Oyewole of The Last Poets. The video aired nationwide and overseas. Both "They Schools" and "Mind Sex" are songs from dead prez's seminal debut album Let's Get Free.

In 2009, Makonnen made his feature film debut, directing the American drama film Dreams and Shadows starring James Russo and Shawn-Caulin Young. The film follows a teenage outcast as he embarks on a misguided mission to avenge the wrongs inflicted on his father.

In 2013, Makonnen directed the award-winning documentary In Search of the Black Knight. The film takes a comedic and thought-provoking look at the current state of African-American relationships. In Search of the Black Knight screened at multiple film festivals across the country and won several "Best Documentary" awards.

Makonnen has also directed several popular digital series including: The New Shade of Black, starring Travina Springer and The Unwritten Rules, starring Aasha Davis. The Unwritten Rules is based on creator Kim Williams' book 40 Hours and an Unwritten Rule: The Diary of an African-American Woman.

In 2022, Makonnen directed the short film "The Scars You Feed". Inspired by true events, the film centers around a man who learns his cancer has returned. While fighting the disease, he's faced with other aspects of his life that are falling apart.

Various entertainment outlets have covered Makonnen's work including MTV, BET, IndieWire and Billboard.

Makonnen is of African-American and Ethiopian descent. His great-grandfather Makonnen Endelkachew and great-uncle Endelkachew Makonnen both served as Ethiopia's Prime Minister under Emperor Haile Selassie.

Makonnen resides in Los Angeles, California.
