= Ben Kopec =

American-based musician and composer (born 1981)

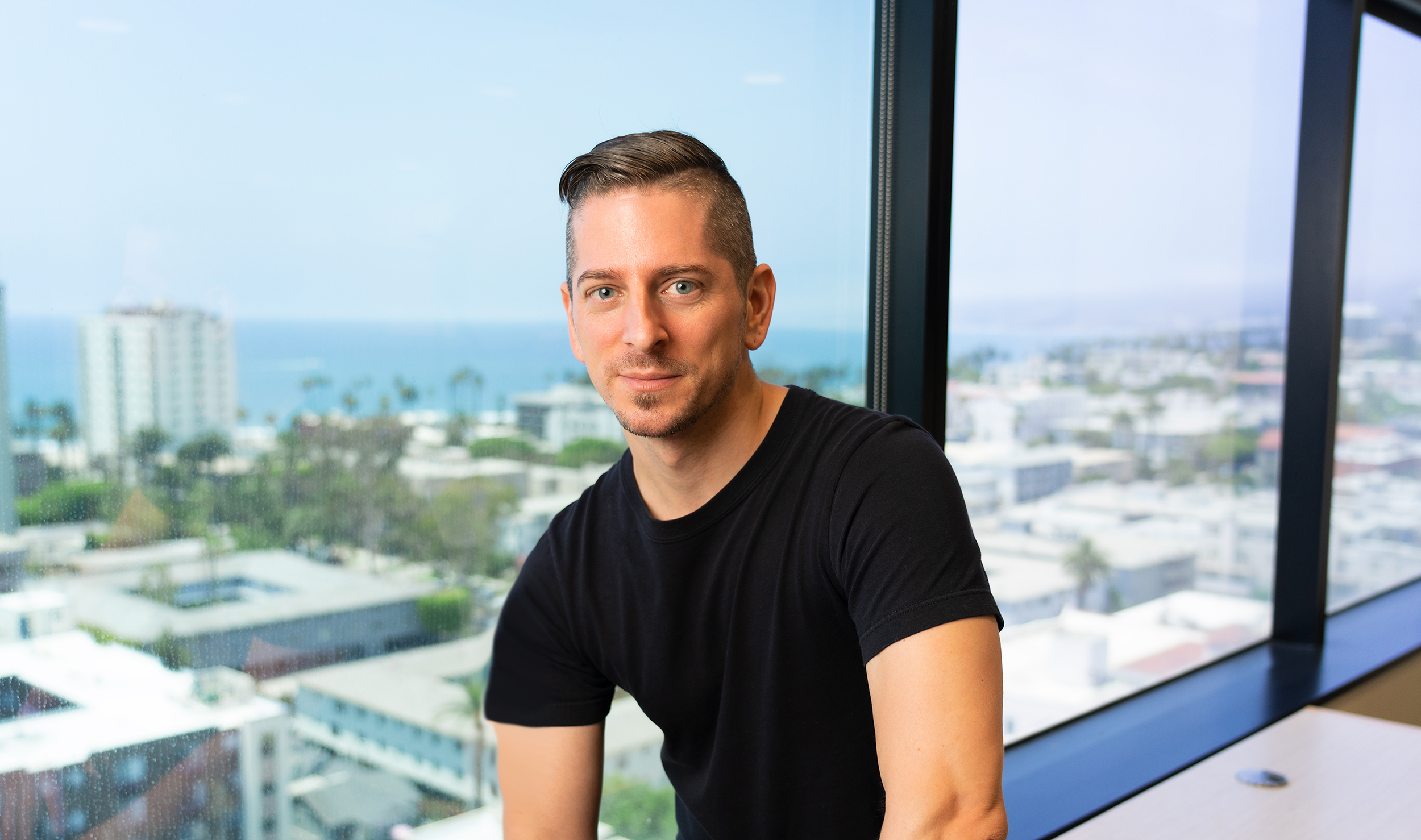

Background information
- Born: Benjamin Nils Kopec; November 10, 1981 (age 43); Derby, Connecticut, U.S.
- Genres: Industrial rock, industrial metal, electronic music, film score, video game music
- Occupation(s): Publisher, composer
- Instrument(s): Vocals, guitar, bass, programming, drums, piano, synthesizer
- Years active: 1999–present
- Labels: Independent

Benjamin Nils Kopec (born November 10, 1981), known better by his stage name, Ben Kopec, is an American-based musician and composer.

As a composer, Kopec has had his music used in feature film trailers including The Tall Man, Never Surrender, and The Curse of Micah Rood. He formed the American-based Industrial rock band Intricate Unit in 1999, but did not start performing live until 2003. Since then Intricate Unit has opened for bands on the East Coast, and headlined their own tour in 2006.

in 2006, Kopec launched Epitome Music Library. The primary goal of the company is to place music into film, TV, video games, advertising campaigns, and other mediums. Previous companies Kopec has started include a Rock Band Authoring service, called The Rock Pulse, to help bands get their music into the Rock Band Network.

In 2018, Kopec launched OnChain Music, a music distribution service for blockchain related music platforms. OnChain Music also help musicians generate royalties on the blockchain through the sale of NFTs.

== Early life and education ==
Kopec studied Music and Sound Recording at the University of New Haven for 2 years before attending and receiving his 4-year Bachelor of Science degree in Audio Engineering at the University of Hartford. He went on to also receive his minor in Communication Studies. Kopec also received his Bachelor of Science degree in electrical engineering. Kopec is currently taking classes for his Master of Science degree in Electrical Engineering.

While attending the University of New Haven, Kopec inherited an 8-year-running industrial music radio station called The Industrial Revolution. The station itself was called WNHU 88.7 FM. Kopec would go on the air every Wednesday from 6 pm to 8 pm for over 2 years.

== Career ==
Kopec started the band Intricate Unit. Having played many shows at Toad's Place in New Haven, CT, the band eventually started playing many shows in the Tri-state area and touring across the country; notably, playing to thousands of people in Ohio in 2006 at the Gathering of the Juggalos.

Kopec composes for film, TV, and video games.

Kopec has placed twice at the Hollywood Reporter Film and TV Music Conference in Los Angeles for his music in trailers and video games.

Kopec also works with Massachusetts-based company Sonicbids for music licensing opportunities. Kopec has been an ASCAP (American Society for Composers and Publishers) member since 2005. Kopec also has a music publishing company called Jukebox Johnny with ASCAP.

In late 2009, Kopec started a company called The Rock Pulse. The mission of this company was to provide a service for bands to get into the Rock Band Network. The Rock Pulse has authored songs for Intricate Unit and Dead By Wednesday. However, Kopec decided in 2011 to focus more of his energy on other companies.

On 10-10-10, Kopec relocated his home and studio to Los Angeles. On June 1, 2011, Kopec's release, Epic Orchestral and Cinematic Rock for Film Trailers, was reviewed and nominated for Best CD of the Year.

In late 2012, Kopec launched Epitome Music Library which represents artists and bands. Some of EML's clients include CBS, Discovery, and Bunnim-Murray.

== Discography ==
=== Ben Kopec ===
- 2004: Film and Game Trax 1
- 2005: Film and Game Trax 2
- 2005: Diverse Dance Music
- 2005: Acoustic Guitar Works
- 2006: Piano Pieces 1
- 2006: Sports Music Vol. 1
- 2007: High Energy Sports Music Vol. 2
- 2008: Cutting Edge Orchestral Music Vol. 1
- 2009: High Energy Sports Music Vol. 3
- 2009: High Impact Trailer Music Vol. 1
- 2010: High Impact Trailer Music Vol. 2
- 2010: Music for Advertising
- 2010: Tension and Drama Music for Modern TV
- 2011: Music for Advertising Vol. 2
- 2011: Music for Video Games
- 2011: Epic Orchestral and Cinematic Rock for Film Trailers

=== Intricate Unit ===
- 1999: Deception
- 2000: Denial
- 2002: Detached
- 2005: Thru-Hole
- 2011: To Live is Pain

== TV credits ==
- MTV / MTV2 / MTV3- Real World Road Rules Challenge, Dr. Drew, Parental Control, Rock Dinner
- CBS – As the World Turns
- Showtime – UFC Fight
- Sony Pictures – The Greg Behrendt Show
- A&E – Ice Road Truckers (History Ch.), Gene Simons Family Values
- FOX Sports – NASCAR
- E! – 10 Vampires We Love
- Oxygen – Bad Girls Club

== Filmography ==
- Promised Land (Soundtrack) (2012)
- Thinking Speed (Score) (2011)
- We Are the Future (Score) (2011)
- Peril on Cemetery Road (Score) (2010)
- The Curse of Micah Rood (Trailer) (2010)
- Never Surrender (2 songs) (2009)
- Regret (composer) (2009)
- Train (Additional Music) (2008)
- This is the Sea 4 (2 songs) (2008)
- This is the Sea 3 (2 songs) (2007)
- This is the Sea 2 (4 songs) (2005)
- This is the Sea 2 (4 songs) (2005)
- Silly (2 songs) (2005)
- That Tiny Little Crevice in the Back of Your Mind (3 songs) (2004)
