= Combat Shock =

1986 film directed by Buddy Giovinazzo

- Film poster
- Directed by: Buddy Giovinazzo
- Written by: Buddy Giovinazzo
- Produced by: Buddy Giovinazzo
- Starring: Ricky Giovinazzo; Veronica Stork; Mitch Maglio; Asaph Livni; Nick Nasta
- Cinematography: Stella Varveris
- Edited by: Buddy Giovinazzo
- Music by: Ricky Giovinazzo
- Production company: 2000 A.D Productions
- Distributed by: Troma Entertainment
- Release date: May 14, 1986 (U.S.)
- Running time: 91 minutes
- Country: United States
- Language: English
- Budget: $40,000 (estimated)

Combat Shock is a 1986 exploitation war drama film written, produced, and directed by Buddy Giovinazzo and starring his brother Rick Giovinazzo in the lead role. The film was distributed by Troma Entertainment.

The plot of the film takes place in Staten Island, and follows an unemployed Vietnam veteran named Frankie Dunlan living in total poverty with his nagging wife, his baby (who is deformed due to Frankie's exposure to Agent Orange), and junkie friends. Unable to get a job and surrounded by the depravity of urban life and crime, he begins to lose his grip on sanity.

The film received mixed to negative reviews upon its release, but has since gained a cult following among Troma fans.

== Plot ==
Frankie Dunlan, an American soldier in the Vietnam War, runs alone through the jungle. As his voice narrates, he reveals that he "goes back there every night" before waking up in his rundown New York apartment, next to his wife Cathy and their deformed infant son. The couple argue over Frankie's unemployment and their son's health, with Frankie believing the baby's deformities are a result of chemical weapons like Agent Orange used during the war.

A junkie scores from the local kingpin, Paco. Frankie waits in line outside the unemployment office as the junkie desperately searches for a needle to shoot up with. Frankie kills time entertaining a child prostitute. The junkie cuts open his arm and pours drugs in it before passing out as a random woman comes upon him and steals his gun and ammunition, putting them in her purse.

Frankie visits the unemployment office but finds no work available. His social worker advises Frankie to return to school, as he has no marketable skills. Frankie reveals he's been unemployed for four months.

He calls his father to ask for money. His father thinks the call is a prank, since he believes his son died in Saigon. Frankie explains that he was reported killed 15 years ago but made it out alive and spent three years in an army hospital recuperating. He tells his father that his wife is pregnant again and they are being evicted, but his father claims that he is also broke and about to die from a heart condition.

Seemingly broken, Frankie comes across the woman who stole the junkie's gun and steals her purse as a last resort. As she screams for help. Paco and his thugs chase Frankie before overcoming and mercilessly beating him. The gun falls out of the bag during the pummeling and when Paco goes through the bag, Frankie grabs the gun and shoots all three men, killing them.

Frankie explains in a voice-over that his father was right: he had died in Saigon and explains that his company had come upon a village where everyone had killed themselves to avoid being raped and murdered by the US soldiers. He realizes that he must similarly 'save' his family, and he returns home.

His wife is horrified by his appearance and briefly tends to his wounds. Frankie becomes catatonic and hallucinates in front of the TV. He reloads the gun and prepares to kill himself but has a hallucination involving Cathy, prompting him to murder Cathy and the baby.

Frankie lays the baby's corpse in the oven and turns it on before pouring himself a glass of spoiled milk, drinking it and shooting himself in the head. The film ends with a train passing by into the night.

== Cast ==
- Rick Giovinazzo as Frankie Dunlan
- Veronica Stork as Cathy Dunlan
- Mitch Maglio as Paco, Gang leader
- Asaph Livni as Labo, Gang member
- Leo Lunney as Frankie's father
- Nick Nasta as Morb, Gang member
- Michael Tierno as Mike a Junkie
- Jim Cooney as Interrogating GI
- Yon Kong Lai as first Vietnamese interrogator
- Arthur Sanders as a Pimp
- Lori Labar as the Lead Prostitute
- Ray Pinero as the Welfare Worker
- Eddie Pepitone as Terry, a Strung-out Junkie
- Martin Blank as a Doctor
- Nancy Zawada as girl on motorcycle
- Bob Mireau as a Security Guard
- Tom Desantis as a man behind Frankie
- Buddy Giovinazzo as a Social Worker

== Release ==
Combat Shock premiered in the United States on May 14, 1986. The film was distributed by Troma Entertainment, known for its independent horror and exploitation films. Prior to its theatrical release, the film was shown on the festival circuit under the title American Nightmares.

Over the years, Combat Shock has gained a cult following and has been released on various home video formats. Troma Entertainment released the film on DVD, including a "25th Anniversary Edition" in 2009 that featured both the original theatrical cut and the director's cut, along with a documentary and other special features. In June 2022, Troma released the film on Blu-ray, which included a new introduction by Lloyd Kaufman and other archival special features.

The film is also available for streaming on various platforms, including Shudder, AMC+, and Prime Video.

=== Critical response ===
Upon its initial release, Combat Shock received a mixed to negative critical response, with many critics expressing discomfort with its bleak tone and graphic content. Vincent Canby of The New York Times dismissed the film as a "family affair" that "means to be shocking but it more often prompts giggles. You don't often see movies as passionately, sincerely misguided as this." TV Guide gave it a negative review, calling it "an intensely downbeat film, although one with some obviously serious (if unsuccessfully realized) pretensions." Dennis Schwartz from Ozus' World Movie Reviews rated the film a C+, noting that director Buddy Giovinazzo "pours on his misgivings about this bad war, and offers his unbridled pretensions of it. But this downer drama... might be too much horror for the viewer to take without any light moments. Nevertheless it offers fine editing and FX work."

Despite initial critical skepticism, Combat Shock has gained a cult following over the years, particularly among fans of independent and exploitation cinema. Retrospective reviews have often highlighted its raw portrayal of urban despair and psychological trauma. Kurt Dahlke of DVD Talk awarded the film 4 out of 5 stars, describing it as "filled to the brim with nerve-shredding nihilism, total despair, and a take no prisoners attitude – actually, it takes prisoners and tortures them before killing them – Combat Shock is one of the bleakest films you'll ever have the chance to see." He added, "It's so bleak it's almost laughable, but the pathos is too real, even with a mutant baby." Film Threat praised the film as an antithesis to more mainstream Vietnam War films like Platoon and Apocalypse Now, writing, "Combat Shock is dismal and depressing, and in its nerve-wracking realism it makes zero excuses for the establishment and its indifference."

Critics have frequently noted the film's uncompromising and often disturbing depiction of a Vietnam veteran's struggle with PTSD and the harsh realities of urban poverty. MONDO DIGITAL described it as an "almost unbearably bleak study of post-traumatic urban torment [that] continues to chafe, shock, and amaze viewers." Starburst Magazine called it "relentlessly dark and hopeless," with final scenes that "will stay with you for a long, long time." Reviewers have drawn comparisons to other bleak and psychologically intense films such as the films Eraserhead and Taxi Driver, recognizing Combat Shock's unique blend of grindhouse aesthetics with a serious examination of its protagonist's mental deterioration. While acknowledging its low budget and occasional amateurish elements, many have lauded the film's effectiveness in conveying a profound sense of hopelessness and its refusal to flinch from life's grim realities.. The film has also become a time piece -- "putting you right back into 1980’s Staten Island, with train stations and streets filled with garbage and graffiti" -- because it was filmed on the streets and not in a studio.
