= Extremities (film) =

1986 film by Robert M. Young

- Theatrical release poster
- Directed by: Robert M. Young
- Written by: William Mastrosimone
- Based on: Extremities by William Mastrosimone
- Produced by: Burt Sugarman
- Starring: Farrah Fawcett; Alfre Woodard; Diana Scarwid; James Russo
- Cinematography: Curtis Clark
- Edited by: Arthur Coburn
- Music by: J.A.C. Redford
- Production company: Atlantic Entertainment Group
- Distributed by: Atlantic Releasing Corporation
- Release date: August 22, 1986
- Running time: 89 minutes
- Country: United States
- Language: English
- Box office: $13.4 million

Extremities is a 1986 American drama film directed by Robert M. Young and written by William Mastrosimone, based on his 1982 off-Broadway play of the same name. The film stars Farrah Fawcett, Alfre Woodard, Diana Scarwid, and James Russo.

Both Fawcett and Russo had appeared in the stage play (Fawcett taking over a role originated by Susan Sarandon). Fawcett received a Golden Globe nomination for Best Actress for her performance in the film.

== Plot ==
While getting into her car one night, Marjorie is attacked at knifepoint by a masked assailant who forces her to drive to a remote location, where he tries to sexually assault her. She manages to flee but leaves her purse behind. While at the police station, she is told that without a positive identification of her attacker, there is little they can do to help— and if he is found, it will be her word against his, and he will likely not face any criminal charges. In the following days, Marjorie lives in continued fear. Meanwhile, her attacker, revealed to be Joe, uses the information from her purse to find out where she lives and also steals mail from the home she shares with her roommates, Pat and Terry, to gain insight into their lives.

One morning, while Pat and Terry are away at work, Joe casually enters her home, claiming he is looking for someone who owes him money. Marjorie quickly realizes he is the man who attacked her and tries to escape, but Joe overpowers her. Throughout the day, Joe repeatedly physically and psychologically abuses her. As he attempts to rape her, Marjorie manages to subdue him by spraying wasp repellent into his eyes.

As she tries to flee once again, Joe taunts her by saying that since he did not actually rape her, the police will let him go, and he vows to come back and kill her. Marjorie binds him and confines him in the fireplace. When Pat and Terry return home, she tells them what happened and that she plans to kill him. Joe tries to manipulate them into turning against Marjorie and believing that he is the victim. Terry falls for his lies and fears they will all be arrested while Pat tries to convince Marjorie to think of the consequences of her decision and to go to the police.

As Marjorie tries to force Joe to confess to what he has done to her, he claims that he and Marjorie were lovers and that she attacked him when he came to end their relationship. Marjorie removes the knife he previously used on her from his jacket, including the mail he stole, and threatens to castrate him if he does not admit the truth. Defeated, Joe confesses that he intended to kill Marjorie, as well as Pat and Terry. He also confesses to raping and murdering three prior women. Marjorie tells Pat to go the police and an abjectly apologetic Terry to go with her. After they leave, Marjorie drags Joe back to the fireplace and stares off with an expression of relief and triumph.

== Cast ==
- Farrah Fawcett as Marjorie
- Alfre Woodard as Pat
- Diana Scarwid as Terry
- James Russo as Joe / "The Assailant"
- Sandy Martin as Officer Sudow
- Eddie Velez as Officer #1
- Tom Everett as Officer #2
- Donna Lynn Leavy as Woman on Phone (voice)
- Enid Kent as Mother at Police Station
- Michael Hennessy as Pizza Man
- Danika Hendrickson as Joe's Daughter
- Clare Wren as Racquetball Player
- James Avery as Security Guard

== Reception ==
Extremities received mixed reviews from critics. The film holds a 36% rating on Rotten Tomatoes based on 11 reviews.

== Award nomination ==
For her performance, Fawcett received a 1986 Golden Globe nomination for Best Actress in a film drama.

The film was named one of the Worst Films of 1986 by Siskel and Ebert.

== Home media ==
Extremities was released to Blu-ray and DVD on May 19, 2015 as a Region 1 widescreen disc.
