= Life Is Hot in Cracktown =

2009 film by Buddy Giovinazzo

- Promotional film poster
- Directed by: Buddy Giovinazzo
- Written by: Buddy Giovinazzo
- Produced by: William Fisch; Larry Rattner
- Starring: Evan Ross; Kerry Washington; Shannyn Sossamon; Brandon Routh; Lara Flynn Boyle; RZA; Victor Rasuk; Thomas Ian Nicholas; Carly Pope; Mark Webber; Edoardo Ballerini; Ariel Winter
- Distributed by: Lightning Media
- Release date: June 26, 2009
- Country: United States
- Language: English

Life Is Hot in Cracktown is a 2009 American crime drama film based on Buddy Giovinazzo's 1993 collection of short stories with the same title. Giovinazzo directed and wrote the film.

== Plot ==
The film intertwines several stories of people in a Manhattan neighborhood ravaged by crack cocaine.

Romeo, a 14-year-old criminal, is the leader of a gang. He lures his girlfriend, Debbie, to a secluded alley where he and another gang member gang rape her. He leads his gang into robbing and torturing a very sick pensioner, and then steps up to doing a murder-for-hire at the behest of a local drug dealer, unaware of the enormous risks.

Manny and Concetta, a young couple, are desperately trying to rise out of poverty and care for their sick baby. Manny works two jobs—the front desk of a drug-riddled flop house by day and the cash register of a frequently-robbed bodega at night.

Another young couple, Marybeth and Benny, are both drug addicts. Marybeth is a transgender woman who makes a bit of money as a street prostitute to pay for surgery, and Benny is into very low-paying burglaries. Their principal source of drugs is a well-off trans person, Ridley, who is looking to follow in Marybeth's footsteps.

Young Willy and younger Susie are the much-neglected children of an addict named Mommy, who makes them sleep on the floor of their one-room apartment. Mommy's current boyfriend, a hot-tempered addict named Chaz, makes the children beg on the street for his drug money. Willy's one bright spot is neighbor child Melody, whose mother pimps her out every night. When Chaz and Mommy leave the children behind while they embark on a drug-fueled quest to get more drug money from a relative of Chaz, Melody is picked up by the police. Willy, meanwhile, is sent on a wild goose chase by Betty, an aging prostitute who enjoys tormenting her neighbors.

== Cast ==
- Evan Ross as Romeo
- Stephanie Lugo as Debbie, Romeo's girlfriend
- Shannyn Sossamon as Concetta, a woman faced with the challenges of raising her sick child, wife of Manny
- Victor Rasuk as her husband Manny, who supports Concetta and his baby by working the front desk of a drug-infested tenement building by day and an often-robbed bodega at night
- Lara Flynn Boyle as a faded and cruel prostitute named Betty McBain
- Thomas Ian Nicholas as Chad Wesley a rookie cop
- Vondie Curtis-Hall as street-toughened veteran cop
- Kerry Washington as Marybeth/Mickey, a transsexual prostitute
- Desmond Harrington as Benny, MaryBeth's "husband"
- Mark Webber as Ridley/Gabrielle, a transgender prostitute and friend of MaryBeth
- Brandon Routh as Sizemore, a homeless drug addict who sometimes talks to Willy
- RZA as a drug dealer named Sammy, who does business with Romeo
- Carly Pope as Stacy
- Tony Plana as an alcoholic man
- Ridge Canipe as Willy, the older brother of Susie
- Edoardo Ballerini as Chas, Mommy's abusive boyfriend
- Illeana Douglas as Mommy, the heavily addicted mother of Willy and Susie
- Elena Franklin as Melody Amber
- Mayte Garcia as Murietta
- Ariel Winter as Susie
- Omar Regan as Cremont
- Jeremy West as Mr. Rutherford, a crippled pensioner robbed by Romeo
- Bryan Becker as Pepperton

== Production ==
Director Buddy Giovinazzo revealed that originally the rape scene came twenty minutes into the film and the film opened in the bodega (convenience store).
