= Intricate Unit =

American industrial rock band

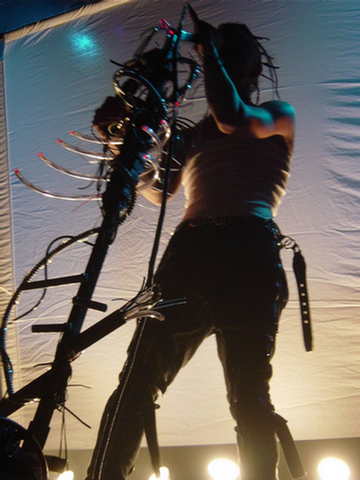
- Ben Kopec of Intricate Unit

Background information
- Origin: New Haven, Connecticut, US
- Genres: Industrial rock; Industrial metal; Electronic music
- Years active: 1999–present
- Labels: Independent
- Members: Ben Kopec
- Website: http://www.intricateunit.com (defunct)

Intricate Unit (IU) is an American industrial rock band formed by Ben Kopec. Kopec is the band's only permanent member, and he is the only current member.

== History ==
=== Formation ===
Shortly after graduating from high school, Kopec formed the first original line up for the band incorporating drummer, Chris Densky, and live guitarist, Jay Saucier. The trio opened for acts such as Dope, Hanzel Und Gretyl, Zeromancer, Bile, and Nocturne. Eventually, this lineup was dissolved. As reported by Kopec in a 2005 interview for Space Junkies Magazine. Densky chose to focus all his energy on his original band. Adva, Saucier, and Kopec chose to split due to moral differences.

Intricate Unit then recruited two new live members: bassist Roger Lockshier and guitarist Mark Turko.

Intricate Unit's current line up consists of keyboardist, Ryan Dest, known better as DJ Nitez, and live guitarist Tom Voytek.

== Tours ==
Intricate Unit has performed with many other bands from the East Coast to the Midwest of the United States. Intricate Unit has opened for bands such as Zeromancer, Insane Clown Posse, Hanzel Und Gretly, and Bile in live performances.

== Discography ==
- 1999: Deception
- 2000: Denial
- 2002: Detached
- 2005: Thru-Hole

== Band members ==
Current lineup

- Ben Kopec – lead vocals, backup guitar (2001–present)

== Music videos ==
- 2004: A Try to Keep Away
- 2004: Angel Moth
- 2005: Vaccination Nation
