= Buddy Giovinazzo =

American film director (born 1957)

- Born: May 5, 1957 (age 69); New York City, U.S.
- Occupations: Film director, author
- Relatives: Rick Giovinazzo (Brother); Carmine Giovinazzo (cousin)

Buddy Giovinazzo (born May 5, 1957) is an American independent filmmaker and author who is known for his gritty, low-budget debut film, Combat Shock, and his collection of harrowing short stories of low urban life in his 1993 anthology, Life Is Hot in Cracktown.

Born May 5, 1957, in New York City, Giovinazzo grew up on Staten Island. He went to the College of Staten Island where he graduated with a masters in cinema, later teaching film there as well.

He is the brother of Rick Giovinazzo, who is a composer, orchestrator, and the star of his premier film, Combat Shock. His cousin is television and film actor Carmine Giovinazzo.

== Bibliography ==
During a time when it was difficult to get a project made for Giovinazzo after his debut film, Combat Shock, he turned to writing novels instead and teaching film.

The published writings of Buddy Giovinazzo:

- Life is Hot in Cracktown (1993) [Thunder's Mouth Press] ISBN 1-56025-054-2
- Poetry & Purgatory (1996) [Thunder's Mouth Press] ISBN 1-56025-133-6
- Broken Street (2000) In German [Maas] ISBN 3-929010-56-9
- Potsdamer Platz (2004) [No Exit Press] ISBN 1-84243-115-3

His anthology, Life is Hot in Cracktown, was adapted into a feature film by Giovinazzo himself as writer and director.

== Filmography ==
- Combat Shock (1986) Writer/Director/Editor/Producer/Actor
- Maniac 2: Mr. Robbie (1986) Director/Producer (short promo film)
- Jonathan of the Night (1987) Writer/Director/Producer
- She's Back (1989) Writer
- No Way Home (1996) Writer/Director/Actor
- Fallen Arches (1998) Actor
- The Unscarred (1999) Director/Producer
- Life Is Hot in Cracktown (2009) Writer/Director (Novel)
- The Theatre Bizarre (2011) Co-director

== Television ==
Sometime during or after The Unscarred, Giovinazzo left the United States for Berlin, Germany where he published his fourth novel, Potsdamer Platz and directed episodes for various German crime programs:

- "Tatort" (3 episodes, 2003–2009)
  - Platt gemacht (2009) TV episode
  - Das Ende des Schweigens (2007) TV episode
  - 3 x schwarzer Kater (2003) TV episode
- "Der Kriminalist" (3 episodes, 2008)
  - Ruhe in Frieden (2008) TV episode
  - Eiskalter Tod (2008) TV episode
  - Avalon (????) TV episode
- "Polizeiruf 110" (2 episodes, 2003–2006)
  - Mit anderen Augen (2006) TV episode
  - Tiefe Wunden (2003) TV episode
- "Wilsberg" (2 episodes, 2005)
  - Todesengel (2005) TV episode
  - Schuld und Sünde (2005) TV episode
