= Extremities (play) =

1982 play by William Mastrosimone

Extremities is an off-Broadway play by William Mastrosimone and directed by Robert Allan Ackerman. It opened at the Westside Theatre in New York on December 22, 1982 and ran for 325 performances.

== Plot ==
A young woman, Marjorie, is attacked in her home by a would-be rapist, Raul, and manages to turn the tables on him, tying him up in her fireplace. Her roommates come home to discover the attacker bound with cords, belts and other household items.

Terry and Patricia, the roommates, express different points of view about rape in society. Terry, a rape victim herself as a teenager, believes that Raul will not be convicted because a rape did not actually occur and there is no proof. Patricia believes in the judicial system and insists on calling the police.

The three friends also turn on each other at various points in the play, due to Raul's knowledge of each through stalking them. For instance, close to the play's opening, Raul reveals to Terry that Marjorie had been having an affair with Terry's boyfriend.

== Memorable cast members ==
Susan Sarandon originated the lead role of Marjorie in the 1982 off-Broadway production. Farrah Fawcett later took over the role, establishing herself as a serious actress. Fawcett also appeared in the 1986 film adaptation. Karen Allen also played Marjorie in the stage production, and actresses who have variously played the roommates include Ellen Barkin, Glenne Headly, Priscilla Lopez, Deborah Hedwall and Lorna Luft.

James Russo portrayed the would-be rapist in both the play and its 1986 film adaptation. He was replaced by Thomas G. Waites in the original off-Broadway production.

Lauren Hutton played Marjorie in the original Los Angeles production.

Helen Mirren starred in the London production.

== Challenges ==
Because of the physicality between the two lead roles, injuries were often the norm. It wasn't uncommon to see the lead actress with bandaged and splinted fingers during the run of the play.

During one performance of the play, an obsessive fan of Farrah Fawcett was in the audience, and he disrupted the show by asking if she had received the pictures and letters he had mailed her. He was removed from the theatre, and police were only able to issue a summons for disorderly conduct.

== Awards ==
- Winner, 1983 Theatre World Award for James Russo as Raul.

== Producers ==
The play was produced by Frank Gero, Mark Gero, Chris Gero, Jason Gero, and Della Koenig.

== See also ==
- Extremities (film)
