= The Unscarred =

2000 film directed by Buddy Giovinazzo

- Directed by: Buddy Giovinazzo
- Written by: Karl Junghans
- Cinematography: Rodger Hinrichs
- Music by: Rick Giovinazzo
- Release date: June 2000 (Cinema Expo)
- Language: English

The Unscarred, also known as Everybody Dies, is a 2000 British-German thriller film produced and directed by Buddy Giovinazzo.

== Cast ==
- James Russo as Mickey Vernon
- Ornella Muti as Rafaella
- Heino Ferch as Johann
- Steven Waddington as Travis Moore
- Ulrike Haase as Anke
- Richard Portnow as Tommy Matolla
- Naike Rivelli as Young Rafaella
