= Salvage (The X-Files) =

- The X-Files episode
- Episode no.: Season 8 Episode 9
- Directed by: Rod Hardy
- Written by: Jeffrey Bell
- Production code: 8ABX10
- Original air date: January 14, 2001
- Running time: 44 minutes

Guest appearances
- Tamara Clatterbuck as Larina Jackson; Dan Desmond as Harry Odell; Arye Gross as Dr. Pugovel; Scott MacDonald as Curtis Delario; Kenneth Meseroll as Owen Harris; Reece Morgan as Owen Harris' Son; Jennifer Parsons as Nora Pearce; Colleen Quinn as Mrs. Harris; Randy Walker as SWAT Officer; Wade Williams as Raymond Aloysius Pearce

Episode chronology
← Previous "Surekill"	Next → "Badlaa"
- The X-Files season 8

"Salvage" is the ninth episode of the eighth season of the American science fiction television series The X-Files. It premiered on the Fox network on January 14, 2001. The episode was written by Jeffrey Bell and directed by Rod Hardy. "Salvage" is a "Monster-of-the-Week" story, unconnected to the series' wider mythology. The episode received a Nielsen rating of 7.1 and was viewed by 11.7 million viewers. Overall, the episode received largely negative reviews from critics.

The series centers on FBI special agents Dana Scully (Gillian Anderson) and her new partner John Doggett (Robert Patrick)—following the alien abduction of her former partner, Fox Mulder (David Duchovny)—who work on cases linked to the paranormal, called X-Files. In this episode, Doggett and Scully encounter a dead man who is still living—only somewhat changed. What they discover is a man made of metal, enacting vengeance on those he believes created him.

"Salvage" was loosely based on Tetsuo: The Iron Man, a 1989 Japanese cyberpunk film by cult-film director Shinya Tsukamoto. Written by Jeffrey Bell before Robert Patrick was cast as agent Doggett, the film coincidentally echoes the plot of the 1991 film Terminator 2: Judgment Day, which Patrick starred in. Indeed, the episode contains an explicit reference to Patrick's role, written in homage. The episode contained several elaborate special effects sequences, most notably in the teaser, wherein a man stops a car with his body.

== Plot ==
In Muncie, Indiana, Nora Pearce and Curtis Delario argue about the death of her husband, Ray, whom Nora believes died from Gulf War Syndrome. Driving home, Delario crashes into a man standing in the road. His car is totaled, but the man is unharmed. Grievously injured, Curtis recognizes him as Ray before Ray kills him. Agents Dana Scully (Gillian Anderson) calls John Doggett (Robert Patrick) investigate the crash. Scully suggests a man stopped the car, but Doggett points out that it would have required a dense block of steel. Scully soon finds Delario's body in a nearby garbage can, with five holes in his face made by human fingers. Doggett finds a fingerprint and Ray Pearce's blood. Nora insists she saw Ray die and does not believe he could have killed Curtis.

Ray later appears at a halfway house, where volunteer Larina Jackson tries unsuccessfully to engage him. At the salvage yard where Ray worked, owner Harry Odell shoots him with a shotgun, telling him, "This time, you stay dead." Outside, Harry watches Ray's detached arm rebuild itself, seemingly with metal, before Ray kills him. Investigating Harry's murder, Doggett finds a shredded document from Chamber Technologies. Dr. Pugovel tells him the company has experimented with "smart metals", which are alloys designed to rebuild themselves. Meanwhile, Scully discovers that Ray did not have Gulf War Syndrome; his cellular structure was changing due to exposure to an unknown substance. Larina sees Ray's obituary and news of the salvage-yard murder and contacts his widow.

Ray arrives at Chamber Technologies, where Pugovel lures him into a containment chamber, but Ray tears through a wall and escapes. He later tells Nora that he did not come home because he is no longer himself. Doggett finds a Chamber Technologies barrel at the salvage yard containing a metal corpse. Pugovel admits it is Dr. Clifton, a researcher poisoned by his work with the alloys. The barrel was supposed to be moved someplace safe but was accidentally sent to the salvage yard, where Ray was exposed to it and transformed. At the halfway house, Ray accidentally kills Larina while hiding from the FBI.

Ray later demands that Nora identify the person responsible. She names Owen Harris but, troubled by Ray's violence against innocent people, alerts the police. Ray finds Harris and nearly kills him, but learns that Harris was an accountant who sent the barrel to the salvage yard by accident. Realizing that such a mistake does not warrant death, Ray spares Owen and instead leaves to die. Scully believes the act represents the last of Ray's humanity. Later, at a salvage yard, a car is dropped into a compactor and crushed. As the scene fades, Ray's eye is revealed inside.

== Production ==
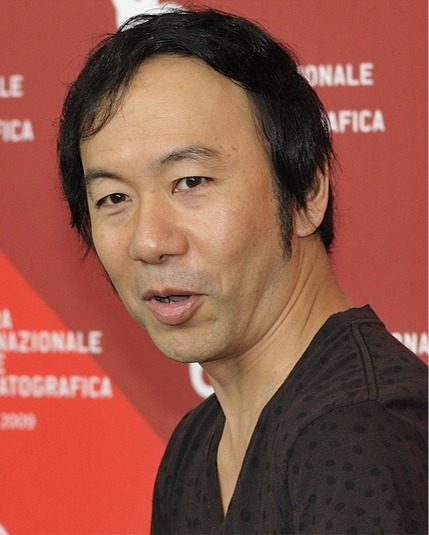
The episode was loosely inspired by the movie Tetsuo: The Iron Man, created by cult-film director Shinya Tsukamoto

=== Writing ===
"Salvage" was written by X-Files staff writer Jeffrey Bell and was "loosely" based on Tetsuo: The Iron Man, a 1989 Japanese cyberpunk film by cult-film director Shinya Tsukamoto. The idea to write an episode about a man whose body is made completely out of "dense metal alloys" was developed by Bell before actor Robert Patrick joined the show. Robert Patrick had previously played the role of a liquid-metal T-1000 android assassin in the 1991 film Terminator 2: Judgment Day. In fact, Patrick had been cast as Agent Doggett by the executives in a hope that his role in the movie would appeal to the 18–34 male demographic, upon which advertising prices are based. Fox had anticipated a 10 percent increase in viewership with the addition of Patrick. Indeed, the episode contains an explicit reference to Patrick's role, written in homage: after hearing Scully's theory, Doggett replies, "What’re you saying? Ray Pearce has become some kind of metal man? 'Cause that only happens in the movies, Agent Scully."

With the filming and airing of "Salvage", Robert Patrick began to feel "comfortable in his new role". He later recalled that "we started seeing our [ratings] numbers. Our numbers were good, and everyone was happy." Several of the characters and locations were named or based after real individuals and places. The three scientists: Chamber, Clifton, and Pugovel, were named after friends of Bell's, who were engineers. Much of the action was based in Muncie, Indiana. Bell picked this location because it was the hometown of his grandparents.

=== Effects ===
In the episode, Ray Pearce, the metal man, was required to stop a car by himself. In order to create this effect, Wade Williams, the actor who played the metal man, was filmed against a green screen. To create the illusion of being hit by a car, the lighting was dropped and a gust of wind from fans occurred at the moment of the supposed impact. The scene was shot at different speeds, a matte was cut, and various effects, like shattering glass and smoke, were overlaid onto the cut footage. A separate scene, featuring a car hitting a green post was then filmed. The two separate images were then composited together. Producer Paul Rabwin later described the scene as "effective".

=== Music ===
A theme from Grieg's Piano Concerto in A Minor is heard multiple times during the episode.

Concerto in A minor: 1. Allegro molto moderato
Performed by the University of Washington Symphony, conducted by Peter Erős (Neal O'Doan, piano)

== Reception ==
"Salvage" first aired on Fox on January 14, 2001. The episode earned a Nielsen household rating of 7.1, meaning that it was seen by 7.1% of the nation's estimated households. The episode was seen by 11.7 million viewers. It ranked as the 54th most-watched episode for the week ending January 14. Subsequently, it debuted in the United Kingdom on the BBC Two on May 5, 2002.

Critical reception to the episode was largely negative. Robert Shearman, in his book Wanting to Believe: A Critical Guide to The X-Files, Millennium & The Lone Gunmen, rated the episode one star out of five. The author noted that the episode diluted the characters of Doggett and Scully in a "mechanical plot", writing "'Salvage' would never have made a great episode, but if it had only bothered to give a little more depth to Doggett and Scully, it might still have been an entertaining one." Paula Vitaris from Cinefantastique gave the episode a negative review and awarded it one-and-a-half stars out of four. Vitaris referred to the episode as an "assembly line monster-of-the-week episode" and criticized it for failing to make the audience truly empathetic to Ray Pearce's plight. However, Vitaris did praise the make-up in the episode, noting that "that makeup is [Wade Andrew] William's performance […] he is an astonishing sight." Not all reviews were so negative. Emily VanDerWerff of The A.V. Club awarded the episode a "B−". She applauded the way the guest star was allowed to "take over" the episode, but felt that the de-emphasis on Scully and Doggett rendered their scenes "boring". Ultimately, VanDerWerff noted that the problem with it was that the two halves of the story—Doggett and Scully investigation, and Ray's plight—were largely unconnected.

== Bibliography ==
- Hurwitz, Matt; Knowles, Chris (2008). The Complete X-Files. Insight Editions. ISBN 978-1933784809.
- Kessenich, Tom (2002). Examination: An Unauthorized Look at Seasons 6–9 of the X-Files. Trafford Publishing. ISBN 1553698126.
- Shearman, Robert (2009). Wanting to Believe: A Critical Guide to The X-Files, Millennium & The Lone Gunmen. Mad Norwegian Press. ISBN 978-0975944691.

This article incorporates material derived from the "Salvage" article on the X-Files wiki at Fandom (formerly Wikia) and is licensed under the Creative Commons Attribution-Share Alike 3.0 License (April 26, 2012).
