= Via Negativa (The X-Files) =

- The X-Files episode
- Doggett tries to kill Scully in a dream. The "eerie" atmosphere was praised by critics, with one referring to it as a "superb X-Files episode."
- Episode no.: Season 8 Episode 7
- Directed by: Tony Wharmby
- Written by: Frank Spotnitz
- Production code: 8ABX07
- Original air date: December 17, 2000
- Running time: 44 minutes

Guest appearances
- Mitch Pileggi as Walter Skinner; James Pickens, Jr. as Alvin Kersh; Tom Braidwood as Melvin Frohike; Dean Haglund as Richard Langly; Bruce Harwood as John Fitzgerald Byers; Wayne Alexander as G. Arnold; Kirk B. R. Woller as Gene Crane; Arlene Pileggi as Skinner's Assistant; Keith Szarabajka as Anthony Tipet; Grant Heslov as Dr. Andre Bormanis; Christopher Jacobs as ER Doctor; Wayne A. King as Homeless Man; Lawrence LeJohn as Angus Stedman; Kevin McClatchy as James Leeds; Mary Ostrow as McCaslin

Episode chronology
← Previous "Redrum"	Next → "Surekill"
- The X-Files season 8

"Via Negativa" is the seventh episode of the eighth season and the 168th episode of the science fiction television series The X-Files. The episode first aired in the United States and Canada on December 17, 2000, on Fox and subsequently aired in the United Kingdom. It was written by executive producer Frank Spotnitz and directed by Tony Wharmby. It is a Monster-of-the-Week episode, unconnected to the series' wider mythology. The episode earned a Nielsen household rating of 7.3 and was viewed by 12.37 million viewers. It was generally well received by television critics, with many positively commenting on the "eerie" atmosphere of the dream sequences; one critic referred to it as a "superb X-Files episode."

The series centers on FBI special agents Dana Scully (Gillian Anderson) and her new partner John Doggett (Robert Patrick)—following the alien abduction of her former partner, Fox Mulder (David Duchovny)—who work on cases linked to the paranormal, called X-Files. In this episode, Scully takes time off to deal with the early stages of her pregnancy, and Doggett and Walter Skinner attempt to avert the mysterious murder spree of a religious cult leader who kills his victims in their sleep. Eventually, the cult leader's essence of evil possesses Doggett, who is urged to murder Scully while he sleeps.

Spotnitz was inspired to write the episode after being intrigued by the mental image of a tube of toothpaste that, when opened, oozed blood. Because Gillian Anderson was not available for most of filming, the recurring characters of Walter Skinner and The Lone Gunmen were brought in. The episode's title, "Via Negativa"—which means "Negative Way" in Latin—is a theology that attempts to describe God by characterizing what God is not.

== Plot ==
In Pittsburgh, FBI agents Angus Stedman (Lawrence LeJohn) and James Leeds (Kevin McClatchy) enter a house they believe houses a cult. While searching through the building, they discover a room filled with bodies of dead cult members. Suddenly, a man wielding an axe and possessing a third eye attacks and kills both of them.

The next day, FBI Agent John Doggett (Robert Patrick) is assigned the case; his partner, Dana Scully (Gillian Anderson), will not be joining him due to personal matters. Doggett instead meets Walter Skinner (Mitch Pileggi) at the crime scene, where Skinner explains that the cult was being monitored due to rumors of drug trafficking. However, all the cult members have been killed and the group's leader, a man named Anthony Tipet (Keith Szarabajka), is missing. Skinner explains that Tipet used the hallucinogenic plant Tabernanthe iboga to bring himself closer to God through the via negativa.

Tracing a call from Tipet leads Doggett and Skinner to drug dealer Andre Bormanis (Grant Heslov). After Bormanis is arrested, Doggett dreams that he himself is holding Scully's severed head. Bormanis similarly dreams of being attacked by rats and is later found dead, his body gnawed. Doggett then meets with The Lone Gunmen, who believe Tipet is using his third eye to project himself into people's dreams, where he kills them telepathically. Doggett and Skinner later find Tipet attempting suicide with a table saw and rush him to the hospital. Although Tipet falls into a coma, Doggett and Skinner remain unsatisfied, believing the unexplained deaths have not been solved.

The next day, Doggett briefly sees a third eye on his forehead and fears that Tipet can still enter his dreams. While leaving the FBI building, he hallucinates Tipet ordering him to kill Scully. Finding himself before her with an axe, Doggett instead turns it on himself. He suddenly awakens in his bedroom with Scully standing over him. He thanks her for saving his life, but she tells him that Tipet has died from his coma.

== Production ==
Frank Spotnitz was inspired to write "Via Negativa" after a rafting trip in which a "friend of a friend" mentioned a disturbing visual: a tube of toothpaste that, when opened, oozed human blood. The idea inspired Spotnitz to work it into an episode, but due to its strangeness, he was unable to think of any real-world scenarios in which this would happen. Consequently, he began to look into "dreams and nightmares." He eventually came up with the idea of a cult trying to reach a higher plane of existence, but instead stumbling into a "lower place, a darker plane." Spotnitz later explained: "What if the higher plane is a darker plane, what if we think we're reaching up but we're reaching down." The episode's title, "Via Negativa," means "Negative Way" in Latin. This type of theology, also referred to as apophatic theology, attempts to describe God by expanding upon what God is not.

That was the one where Doggett's mind was possessed by the leader of a religious group that was invading people's psyches .... He started to get into my head. That was a great experience as an actor. It was challenging and a lot of fun. So far as specific character moments, I think he gained Scully's trust and respect. He came through in the sense that he found Mulder.

— Robert Patrick, talking about his character in this episode.

Gillian Anderson's character Dana Scully would not be available, since the writing staff had decided before the episode was written that she would spend most of her time in the hospital. Spotnitz saw this as an opportunity to further evolve Doggett's character. In order to fill Anderson's void, two recurring groups of characters were brought in: Walter Skinner and The Lone Gunmen. Spotnitz noted that, "we were eager to get Skinner out from behind the desk, and we were always looking for opportunities to get him out of that office and get him into the field." Mitch Pileggi, who portrayed Walter Skinner, was pleased with the final product. He later complimented the work of Robert Patrick, who played Doggett, saying, "It was a big hole when Mulder was gone, but I thought that Robert came in and did a wonderful job. He brought a really good energy to the set, and it was a lot of fun getting to know and work with him." Spotnitz was eager to use The Lone Gunmen in the episode, since this the episode would mark their first scene together with Doggett. Robert Patrick called the episode his "favorite episode," because the writers created a "vulnerable" moment for his character.

The character of Andre Bormanis was named after one of Spotnitz's childhood friends, who went on to become one of the science consultants for both Star Trek: Voyager and Star Trek: Deep Space Nine. In preparing the character's death scene, Tony Wharmby, the episode's director, spent a whole day shooting inserts of rats. In total, the film crew used 500 rats. Initially, Wharmby had an issue getting a shot where the rats congregate in the middle of a room. In order to fix this, animal trainers continuously released more rats until the middle part of the room was finally covered. The crew later spent many hours "painting out rat droppings in that shot."

== Reception ==
=== Ratings ===
"Via Negativa" premiered on December 17, 2000, on American television on Fox. The episode earned a Nielsen household rating of 7.3, meaning that it was seen by 7.3% of the nation's estimated households. The episode was seen by 12.37 million viewers.

=== Reviews ===
"Via Negativa" received mostly positive reviews from critics. Michael Roffman of Time named it the "best post-Mulder" episode, stating that "episodes like this proved there were just enough thrills to get by without Spooky". Zack Handlen of The A.V. Club awarded the episode an "A−" and noted that the episode had an "undeniable power that took me almost entirely off-guard". Although cautioning that "Via Negativa" is not "some kind of lost classic" and that the story itself was not "all that impressive", he praised the atmosphere of the episode, describing it as "heavy, doom-laden, and frequently bizarre". In fact, he argued that it largely "makes up for any shortcomings in the script". Robert Shearman, in his book Wanting to Believe: A Critical Guide to The X-Files, Millennium & The Lone Gunmen, rated the episode five stars out of five and called it "one of the best standalone X-Files in years."

George Avaros and Michael Liedtke from the Contra Costa Times were overall positive towards the episode, saying it had all the features which created a "superb X-Files episode". They further stated that it had an "eerie, almost surreal quality sprinkled with pithy dialogue, comic relief and cryptic insights into key characters that left us wondering what sort of trouble might be around the bend". Avaros and Liedtke also reacted positively to the numerous references to Fox Mulder. Finally, they compared the episode to the work of David Lynch in his series, Twin Peaks. Paula Vitaris from Cinefantastique gave the episode a moderately positive review and awarded it two-and-a-half stars out of four. She noted that, "'Via Negativa' is short on plot but makes up for it by being long on atmosphere and mood, conjuring up a number of disgusting, eerie images".
