= No Way Home (1996 film) =

- UK theatrical poster
- Directed by: Buddy Giovinazzo
- Written by: Buddy Giovinazzo
- Starring: Tim Roth; Deborah Kara Unger; James Russo; Catherine Kellner
- Cinematography: Claudia Raschke
- Edited by: Stanley Warnow
- Music by: Rick Giovinazzo
- Release date: 1996
- Country: United States
- Language: English

No Way Home is a 1996 American crime drama film written and directed by Buddy Giovinazzo.

== Plot ==
Joey was convicted of killing a shop-owner during a botched burglary and serves a six years sentence. His prison term leaves him with many mental and physical scars due to assaults he suffered.

Upon release, Joey is determined to abandon prison. He seeks out his elder brother, Tommy, and meets his new wife Lorraine, a beautiful blonde who is initially distrustful of Joey. Joey discovers that Tommy has gotten involved with drug dealing. Meanwhile, Lorraine and Joey develop a special relationship.

== Cast ==
- Tim Roth as Joey Larabito
- James Russo as Tommy Larabito
- Deborah Kara Unger as Lorraine Larabito
- Joseph Ragno as Ralphie
- Catherine Kellner as Denise
- Saul Stein as Brick

== Reception ==
Ken Eisner of Variety critiqued the film, writing that the film "is both too bleak and too familiar to spark much mainstream interest" while also praising Tim Roth and Deborah Kara Unger. Meanwhile, The Guardian wrote that the title, "No Way Home", should be "No Big Deal" as it may describe it better.

== Legacy ==
In 2020, the Fantasia International Film Festival premiered a 4K Restoration of the film. The restoration was done by Severin Films.
