= Badlaa =

- The X-Files episode
- The Indian beggar, the episode's main antagonist. The character was played by noted stuntman Deep Roy.
- Episode no.: Season 8 Episode 10
- Directed by: Tony Wharmby
- Written by: John Shiban
- Production code: 8ABX12
- Original air date: January 21, 2001
- Running time: 44 minutes

Guest appearances
- Tony Adelman as Trevor's Father; Jane Daly as Mrs. Holt; Ruth de Sosa as Quinton's Mother; Bill Dow as Charles Burks; Jacob Franchek as Red-Headed Kid; Andy Hubbell as Quinton's Father; Christopher Huston as Mr. Burrard; Kiran Rao as Customs Agent; Calvin Remsberg as Hugh Potocki; Deep Roy as Beggar Man; Mimi Savage as Teacher; Maura Soden as Trevor's Mother; Winston Story as Bellboy; Jordan Blake Warkol as Quinton; Michael Welch as Trevor

Episode chronology
← Previous "Salvage"	Next → "The Gift"
- The X-Files season 8

"Badlaa" is the tenth episode of the eighth season of the American science fiction television series The X-Files. It premiered on the Fox network on January 21, 2001. The episode was written by John Shiban and directed by Tony Wharmby. "Badlaa" is a "Monster-of-the-Week" story, unconnected to the series' wider mythology. The episode received a Nielsen rating of 7.3 and was viewed by 11.8 million viewers. Overall, the episode received mostly negative reviews from critics.

The series centers on FBI special agents Dana Scully (Gillian Anderson) and her new partner John Doggett (Robert Patrick)—following the alien abduction of her former partner, Fox Mulder (David Duchovny)—who work on cases linked to the paranormal, called X-Files. When a mystic smuggles himself out of India, Scully and Doggett give chase as his murderous spree starts terrorising two families in suburban Washington, D.C. But Scully soon comes upon a crisis of faith when she realises how dissimilar her techniques are from those of Mulder, even as she tries to be the believer.

"Badlaa" was inspired by stories of Indian fakirs as well as the idea of someone asking for money actually being "a bad guy." Gurdeep Roy, a noted stuntman better known as Deep Roy, was chosen to play the part of the antagonistic beggar. The episode's title means "vengeance" or "revenge" in Hindi.

== Plot ==
At the Sahar International Airport in Mumbai, India, an obese American businessman passes a double amputee beggar. While using the airport's toilet, the businessman is violently pulled from the stall by the beggar. Later, he checks into a Washington, D.C., hotel, where blood suddenly streams from his bodily orifices. Dana Scully (Gillian Anderson) arrives at the crime scene, and John Doggett (Robert Patrick) tells her the man's blood abruptly drained in the hotel. Later, in the morgue, Scully finds massive stomach damage and determines that the man died 24 to 36 hours earlier, before he left India. A discrepancy in his weight leads her to believe there was a passenger inside the corpse.

Meanwhile, the beggar, disguised as an ordinary-looking white man, takes a janitorial job at a Cheverly, Maryland elementary school. Quinton, a student at the Cheverly school, sees the legless beggar at night. His father dismisses it as imagination, but is later found dead with blood dripping from his eyes. Investigating, Scully concludes that the mysterious man may still be inside the victim. At the morgue, she cuts into his distended belly and sees a hand emerge from the incision. After being knocked down, she follows a bloody trail to an empty storage closet, unaware that the invisible beggar is watching her. Later, at school, Trevor, a bully who had tormented Quinton, sees flickers of the beggar briefly for who he is. He later apologizes to Quinton and tells him who he thinks killed his father.

Scully and Doggett consult Chuck Burks, an old friend of Fox Mulder's, who tells them about fakirs and Siddhi mystics capable of altering people's perceptions of reality. Though Doggett remains skeptical, Scully theorizes that a Siddhi (i.e., the beggar seen throughout the episode) is seeking revenge against people connected to an accident at an American chemical plant on the outskirts of Mumbai, which killed 118 people. Later, after acting on a tip, Doggett arrests the janitor, but when Chuck arrives with a video camera, the two learn that no one is actually sitting where the janitor appears to be. Doggett and Chuck realize they do not have a suspect in custody.

Meanwhile, Quinton and Trevor hunt the beggar at school, while the principal alerts Scully that the janitor has returned. The beggar begins stalking the boys and takes Trevor's form just as Scully arrives. She hesitantly fires at the boy, wounding the beggar, who reverts to his true form.

== Production ==
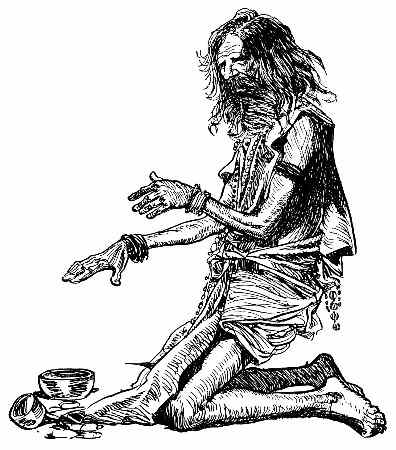
The episode was inspired by stories of Indian fakirs.

The title of "Badlaa"—which was written by John Shiban and inspired by stories of Indian fakirs—means "to retort" or "to revenge" in Urdu. Shiban was also inspired when he wondered: "What if someone who came up to me and asked me for money was actually a bad guy?" Shiban later noted that his early drafts of the episode featured the antagonist "with no legs who can actually shrink himself and climb inside your ear". Carter vetoed the idea and suggested that it be revised. Shiban later said that "... one thing about this episode that I'm sort of proud is that people often have told me that it is the most disgusting thought that they ever had, that this little man would actually enter your body and travel around inside you."

The scenes featuring the Indian airport were filmed at a cruise line terminal in Long Beach, California. Ilt Jones, the location manager for the series, felt that the "dated feel" of the terminal added to the scene. He noted, "if you look at newsreel footage of India, they always have old English cars from the sixties, the cruise line terminal in Long Beach was perfect."

Casting director Rick Millikan was tasked with finding a suitable actor to play the part of the beggar. Millikan's only instructions were to look for "a small all-Indian man with no legs." Eventually, Gurdeep Roy, better known as Deep Roy was chosen to play the part. Deep Roy was a noted stunt man who had notably played Droopy McCool of the Max Rebo Band in Return of the Jedi. Deep Roy, however, is not an amputee and so a cart with a false bottom was created. Anytime there was a scene where the beggar had to move, blue screen technology was used to add the background in during post-production. The cart featured a distinct "squeak" that Paul Rabwin described as "creepy". He noted, "There was a squeak that had to let us know that it was him. It had to scare us [...] Finally we came up with what we thought was just the right squeak and John [Shiban] said 'Okay, that's the one.'"

Producer Paul Rabwin was displeased with the episode, noting, "'Badlaa' was the one episode I did not like the most [...] I think if I had done it different, I would have had John Shiban change the method of transportation. I don't think it ever worked on any level for me. It was just weird and creepy, but I think the whole idea was distasteful to me." He later bluntly concluded that "it's the only episode that I kind of wish we hadn't done."

== Reception ==
"Badlaa" first aired on Fox on 21 January 2001. The episode earned a Nielsen household rating of 7.3, meaning that it was seen by 7.3% of the nation's estimated households. The episode was seen by 11.8 million viewers. The episode ranked as the 50th most-watched episode for the week ending January 21. The episode subsequently debuted in the United Kingdom on the BBC Two on May 12, 2002.

Critical reception to the episode was mostly negative. Robert Shearman, in his book Wanting to Believe: A Critical Guide to The X-Files, Millennium & The Lone Gunmen, rated the episode two stars out of five. The author noted that the episode was "best" when "it's at its most tasteless". Shearman, however, noted that it suffered from the fact that "it doesn't have the courage of its convictions". Emily St. James of The A.V. Club awarded the episode a "C+", calling it "a messy episode". She argued that it is an example of "magnificently bad television". This in turn, makes it somewhat entertaining; St. James argued that she would "rather watch this episode several times than I would some of those season seven outings where everybody seemed like they would rather be just about anywhere else." However, she did compliment the episode's gross-out scares, noting that the beginning was "a pretty great cold open". Tom Kessenich, in his book Examinations, was extremely critical of the episode. Referring to it as the series' "nadir", he ridiculed the plot and sarcastically labeled the main villain the "Butt Munch". Paula Vitaris from Cinefantastique gave the episode a negative review and awarded it one star out of four. Vitaris, sardonically referring to the episode as "The X(enophobic)-Files", noted that while "the butt-crawler is new, the plot is pure "X-Files generic Monster-of-the-Week." Matt Hurwitz and Chris Knowles noted in their book The Complete X-Files that the episode soon became known as the "'Butt Genie' episode" among fans.

Despite the negativity, several reviews wrote positively of the episode's antagonistic beggar. Both TV Guide and UGO Networks listed him amongst the greatest monster-of-the-week characters in The X-Files. The UGO review, in particular, noted that the character was "One of the series' more blatant allegories [...], as a legless Indian Mystic [...] literally climbs into his victims to travel where he will. [...] Scully and Doggett investigate the bloody goings-on [...] and a gut-wrenching climax, though not entirely successful, still opens up some thorny issues over how we view weakness, deformity, race, and 'otherness.'

== Bibliography ==
- Fraga, Erica (2010). LAX-Files: Behind the Scenes with the Los Angeles Cast and Crew. CreateSpace. ISBN 9781451503418.
- Hurwitz, Matt; Knowles, Chris (2008). The Complete X-Files. Insight Editions. ISBN 978-1933784809.
- Kessenich, Tom (2002). Examination: An Unauthorized Look at Seasons 6–9 of the X-Files. Trafford Publishing. ISBN 1553698126.
- Shearman, Robert (2009). Wanting to Believe: A Critical Guide to The X-Files, Millennium & The Lone Gunmen. Mad Norwegian Press. ISBN 978-0975944691.

This article incorporates material derived from the "Badlaa" article on the X-Files wiki at Fandom (formerly Wikia) and is licensed under the Creative Commons Attribution-Share Alike 3.0 License (April 24, 2012).
