= Never Surrender (film) =

2009 film by Héctor Echavarría

- "Never Surrender" Film Poster
- Directed by: Hector Echavarria
- Written by: Hector Echavarria; David Storey
- Produced by: Hector Echavarria; Curtis Petersen
- Starring: Hector Echavarria; B.J. Penn; Georges St. Pierre; Anderson Silva; Quinton Jackson; Heath Herring
- Distributed by: Lions Gate Entertainment
- Release date: April 28, 2009
- Language: English

Never Surrender is a 2009 MMA film about an MMA champion who finds himself fighting in illegal underground cage fights. The film's cast features a number of real MMA fighters. It was filmed in Los Angeles, California and was produced by Destiny Entertainment Productions. It is distributed in the United States by Lions Gate Entertainment.

== Cast ==
- Hector Echavarria as Diego Carter
- Patrick Kilpatrick as Seifer
- Silvia Koys as Sandra
- James Russo as Jimmy
- Georges St-Pierre as Georges
- Anderson Silva as Spider
- Heath Herring as Stone
- Quinton Jackson as Rampage
- B.J. Penn as BJ
- Damian Perkins as Diamond
- Lateef Crowder as Marco
- Gunter Schlierkamp as Crusher

== Reception ==
Bill Gibron of PopMatters gave the film a score of 7/10 and called it "groin-grabbing entertainment that never even attempts to engage you on an intellectual level" and "unapologetic at delivering exactly what you expect from a movie made up of MMA members". Sander Collin of Cinemagazine rated the film 3.5/5 stars and opined that the film was lighthearted and entertaining if forgettable and unoriginal. Conversely, David Walker of DVD Talk rated the film 0.5/5 stars, calling it "so bad that it only warrants a viewing if it appears on cable (uncut, of course), at a time when there's nothing else on, you have nothing else to do, you have insomnia and have run out of sleeping pills."

== See also ==
- Confessions of a Pit Fighter, a 2005 film with a similar theme
