= Surekill =

- The X-Files episode
- Episode no.: Season 8 Episode 8
- Directed by: Terrence O'Hara
- Written by: Greg Walker
- Production code: 8ABX09
- Original air date: January 7, 2001
- Running time: 44 minutes

Guest appearances
- Michael Bowen as Dwight Cooper; Kellie Waymire as Tammi Peyton; Patrick Kilpatrick as Randall Cooper; Joe Sabatino as Al Triguero; Tom Jourden as Carlton Chase; Ty Upshaw as Officer #1; James Franco as Officer #2; Noel Guglielmi as Gangbanger #1; Greg Boniface as Gangbanger #2

Episode chronology
| ← Previous "Via Negativa" | Next → "Salvage" |
- The X-Files season 8

"Surekill" is the eighth episode of the eighth season of the American science fiction television series The X-Files. It premiered on the Fox network on January 7, 2001. The episode was written by Greg Walker and directed by Terrence O'Hara. "Surekill" is a "Monster-of-the-Week" story, unconnected to the series' wider mythology. The episode received a Nielsen rating of 8.0 and was viewed by 13.3 million viewers. Overall, the episode received mixed-to-negative reviews from critics.

The series centers on FBI special agents Dana Scully (Gillian Anderson) and her new partner John Doggett (Robert Patrick)—following the alien abduction of her former partner, Fox Mulder (David Duchovny)—who work on cases linked to the paranormal, called X-Files. In this episode, the fatal shooting of a realtor, while alone in a cinderblock jail cell, has Doggett struggling to find out who committed the murder and how the crime was committed. Scully and Doggett, however, soon learn that there is more to this case than meets the eye.

Due to the presence of his "biker buddy" Michael Bowen, series co-star Robert Patrick was noticeably more energized than usual to film the episode, according to Gillian Anderson. In addition, scenes at "AAA-1 Surekill Exterminators", the business run by Randall and Dwight, were filmed at an actual business front located on Palmetto Street in Los Angeles.

== Plot ==
In Worcester, Massachusetts, Carlton Chase runs from an unknown assailant to a police station, where he is placed in a cinder-block room with a steel door. Despite being locked inside, he is mysteriously shot and killed. Dana Scully (Gillian Anderson) and John Doggett (Robert Patrick) discover that the armor-piercing round was fired through the roof, ceiling, and ductwork into the room. Meanwhile, at AAA-1 Surekill Exterminators, employee Tammi Peyton hears a message Chase left for her before his death, in which he accuses her of stealing from the company. When her boss, Dwight Cooper, confronts her about the message, she informs him that Chase has been killed, Dwight locates his brother, Randall, and tells him that he does not mind what he does as long as he asks first.

Investigating Chase's home, Scully and Doggett find a bullet casing. Scully proposes that the killer can perceive wavelengths of light invisible to the ordinary human eye, allowing him to virtually see through walls. Doggett and Scully learn that Chase had done business with Surekill, and so that duo visit the establishment. However, when the agents question him, Dwight denies knowing why Chase called shortly before his death. After the agents leave, Dwight confronts Tammi, who lies about the message while Randall watches her through a wall.

The next morning, Tammi attempts to retrieve records and a key connected to money she has been stealing from Dwight, but as she attempts to flee, Dwight catches her. Suddenly, Doggett and Scully arrive with a search warrant, and the agents discover that Randall can see through walls. The two also discover payment records between Chase and Surekill. It turns out that Chase had learned that Tammi was stealing from Dwight and was blackmailing her for sex. Randall, who was in love with Tammi and had secretly watched her through walls, witnessed their encounters and killed Chase out of jealousy and a desire to protect her.

Elsewhere, Tammi meets with Randall, and the two discuss fleeing together once she recovers the stolen money. However, when Tammi manages to retrieve the stolen money, Dwight takes her at gunpoint. Realizing that Randall killed Chase out of jealousy over Tammi, Dwight orders his brother to kill her; forced to choose between Dwight and the woman he loves, Randall shoots through the wall and kills his brother. Randall is arrested, but Tammi manages to escape.

== Production ==
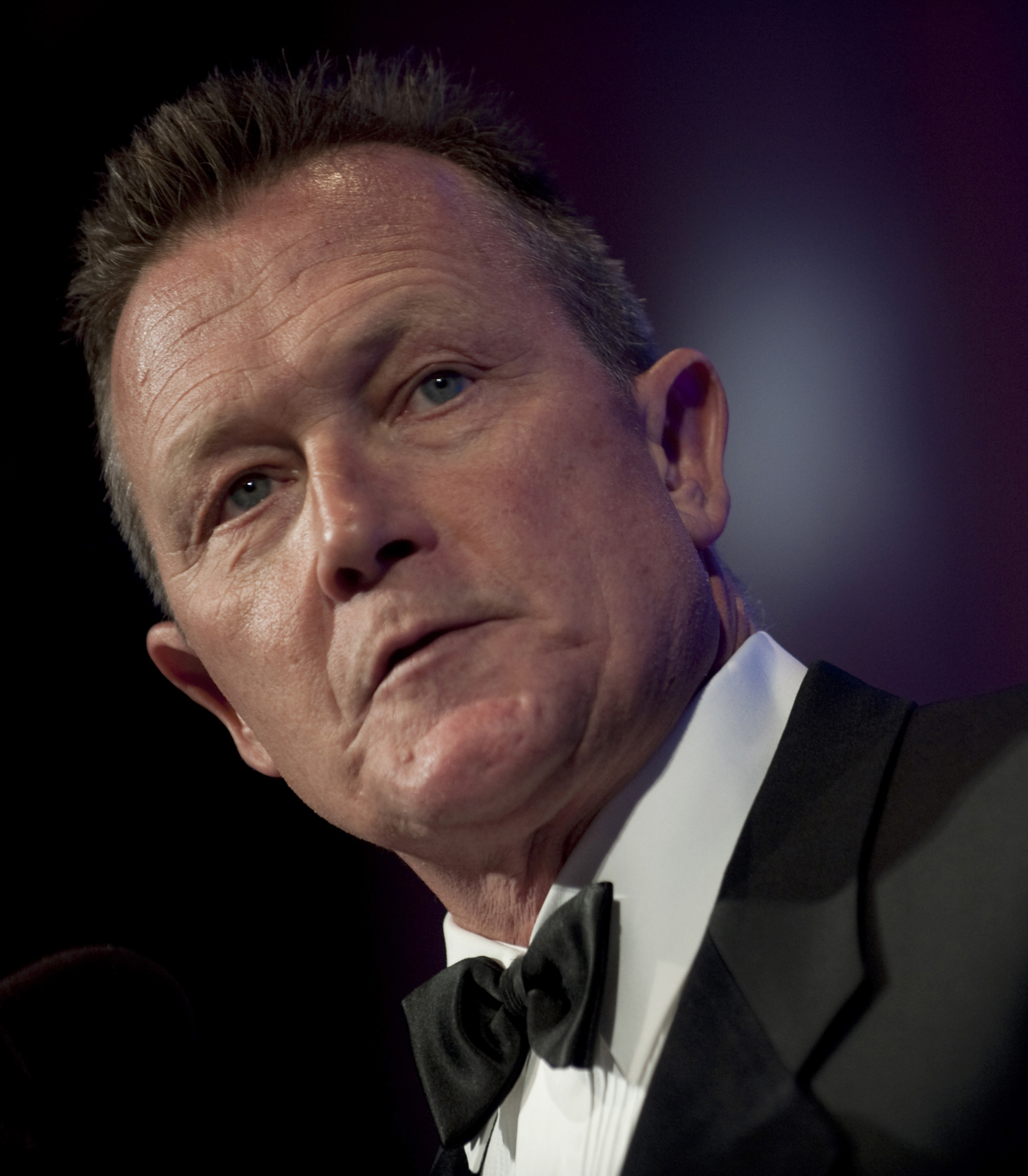
Robert Patrick was notably energized to work on "Surekill".

"Surekill" was written by executive story editor Greg Walker, and marked his second script contribution to the series, after season seven's "Brand X". "Surekill" was the first and only episode of The X-Files to be directed by Terrence O'Hara. Although the episode was the eighth aired in the season, it was actually the ninth one filmed, as evidenced by its production number: 8ABX09. Scenes at "AAA-1 Surekill Exterminators", the business ran by Randall and Dwight, were filmed at an actual business front located on Palmetto Street in Los Angeles.

"Surekill" guest starred Michael Bowen, a "biker buddy" of series co-star Robert Patrick. Because of this, Patrick was noticeably more energetic on the set of the episode. Co-star Gillian Anderson recounted, "Robert was like an Energizer Bunny. He was just wound and wouldn't unwind until the day was done, no matter how long the day went. So that picked up the energy of the series, in a sense."

== Reception ==
"Surekill" first aired on Fox on January 7, 2001. The episode earned a Nielsen household rating of 8.0, meaning that it was seen by 8.0% of the nation's estimated households. The episode was seen by 13.3 million viewers. The episode ranked as the 36th most-watched episode for the week ending December 3. The episode subsequently aired in the United Kingdom on BBC Two on April 28, 2002.

The episode received mixed-to-negative reviews from critics. Zack Handlen of The A.V. Club awarded the episode a "B−" and called the episode "thoroughly mundane", especially in comparison to the preceding episode, "Via Negativa". Handlen felt that "because all of this is very familiar, and without any of the characters distinguishing themselves, there isn’t much reason to watch." Ultimately, he concluded that "'Surekill' isn't terrible, but it's far too easy to see right through." Robert Shearman, in his book Wanting to Believe: A Critical Guide to The X-Files, Millennium & The Lone Gunmen, rated the episode one star out of five. The author derided the episode for being overly "dull", noting "you watch with open mouth amazement that writer Greg Walker can spin this premise out for forty-five minutes." Paula Vitaris from Cinefantastique gave the episode a negative review and awarded it one-and-a-half stars out of four. Vitaris noted that the episode "takes itself far too seriously", which resulted in "lifeless guest characters".

== Bibliography ==
- Fraga, Erica (2010). LAX-Files: Behind the Scenes with the Los Angeles Cast and Crew. CreateSpace. ISBN 9781451503418.
- Hurwitz, Matt; Knowles, Chris (2008). The Complete X-Files. Insight Editions. ISBN 978-1933784809.
- Shearman, Robert (2009). Wanting to Believe: A Critical Guide to The X-Files, Millennium & The Lone Gunmen. Mad Norwegian Press. ISBN 978-0975944691.

This article incorporates material derived from the "Surekill" article on the X-Files wiki at Fandom (formerly Wikia) and is licensed under the Creative Commons Attribution-Share Alike 3.0 License (May 11, 2012).
