= Unrivaled (film) =

2010 action drama film

- Directed by: Warren P. Sonoda
- Written by: Hector Echavarria
- Produced by: Hector Echavarria; Sean Buckley
- Starring: Hector Echavarria; Steven Yaffee
- Release date: March 16, 2010
- Countries: United States; Canada
- Language: English

Unrivaled is a 2010 American-Canadian action drama film directed by Warren P. Sonoda and written, produced and starring Hector Echavarria. Echevarria stars as down-and-out cage fighter Ringo Duran.

== Plot synopsis ==
Ringo Duran is a cage fighter who has two jobs and thinks he's the best fighter, but the only problem is that he doesn't know he's really the best. His passion is full contact fighting and his goal is to fulfill a lifelong dream of becoming a professional fighter. Ringo has put off attempts at a professional career for so long he has nearly succumbed to age. but when the Maximum Cage Warriors (MCW) league, the preeminent full contact fighting promoters, announce a competition to select the best undiscovered fighter, Ringo's friends urge him to join.

Ringo, once again, claims he is not ready. Even Kara, Ringo's love interest, pushes him to join, but Ringo resists. Seeing his skill and desire to become a professional his mate Link surprises him with a last minute online registration to the MCW: Undiscovered tournament. Four fighters will be selected. Thousands submit and the chances of making the cut are slim. One day, at Ringo's local training gym, where his greatest rival also trains, it is announced on the news on television that Ringo Duran will be one of the four fighters, but so will his rival, Alonso Scott. Ringo is reluctant at first, but his coach, friend and love interest convince him to compete and he heads straight into training to prepare for the tournament.
