= Dreams and Shadows =

- theatrical poster
- Directed by: Tamarat Makonnen
- Written by: Tamarat Makonnen
- Produced by: Tamarat Makonnen; Chris Smith; Alex Cohen
- Starring: James Russo; Shawn-Caulin Young
- Cinematography: Grisha Alasadi
- Edited by: Adam Sonnenfeld
- Music by: Jeffrey Michael
- Production company: Filmwalker Productions
- Distributed by: Synkronized
- Release date: October 2, 2009 (world premiere)
- Running time: 94 minutes
- Country: United States
- Language: English

Dreams and Shadows is a 2009 American drama film written and directed by Tamarat Makonnen in his feature film debut. The film stars James Russo and Shawn-Caulin Young. Dreams and Shadows had its world premiere in Los Angeles California at the American Film Institute on October 2, 2009.

== Plot ==
Billy (Shawn-Caulin Young), a teenage outcast drifts into his own vivid imagination to escape his bleak surroundings. His father (James Russo) is a paraplegic whose own dreams of happiness have faded away in an alcoholic haze. In a twisted attempt to find his purpose in life, the teen hatches a plot to seek vengeance on the man who allegedly crippled his father many years ago. However, he soon finds that things aren't always what they seem, as his mission for revenge may ultimately become one for his very own survival.

== Cast ==
- James Russo as John Brunette
- Shawn-Caulin Young as Billy Brunette
- Yoshi Ando as Samurai
- Kathy Christopherson as Krissy
- Julie Clark as Lorrie Brunette
- Joseph Darden as Tommy
- Robert Dolan as Lester
- Natalie Garcia Fryman as Sarah
- James Gibler as Twiggy
- Sean Ridgway as Spike
- Londale Theus as Eddie Vincent
- Cody Hamilton as Young Billy
- Mary Mackey as Prostitute

== Critical reception ==
The film was given a rating of 3 out of 5 stars by We are Movie Geeks, who noted that the essence of Dreams and Shadows is "strong" with the film appearing to be something between a "dramatic soap opera and a pulp film noir". They also mentioned that "There are elements of classic storytelling that linger just beneath the surface of Dreams and Shadows, from Oedipus Rex to MacBeth".

== Home media ==
Dreams and Shadows was released on DVD October 12, 2010. It was distributed in the US and Canada by E1 Entertainment/Synkronized, and includes the behind the scenes featurette The Making of Dreams and Shadows.
