= Chavez Cage of Glory =

- Theatrical release poster
- Directed by: Héctor Echavarría
- Written by: Héctor Echavarría
- Produced by: Héctor Echavarría
- Starring: Danny Trejo; Steven Bauer; Héctor Echavarría; James Russo
- Music by: Niel Argo
- Production company: Destiny Entertainment
- Release date: September 13, 2013
- Running time: 92 minutes
- Country: United States
- Language: English

Chavez Cage of Glory or Chavez: Cage of Glory is a 2013 American action martial arts film written, directed by and starring Héctor Echavarría, and co-starring Danny Trejo, James Russo and Steven Bauer.

== Premise ==
Not being able to cover his ill son's medical bills, a man named Chavez returns to his fighting roots in the underbelly of Los Angeles.

== Critical reception ==
Variety said in its review "There’s precious little glory — and not even that much cage fighting — in “Chavez: Cage of Glory,” a poverty-row vanity project for Argentinian mixed martial arts champ Hector Echevarria." Variety added "This hilariously straight-faced inventory of moth-eaten fight-movie cliches opened Sept. 13 on a few dozen SoCal screens via Echevarria’s own Destiny Entertainment label, and just as promptly vacated them." Variety also said "Pic’s production “values” (or lack thereof) make the average telenovela look like “Masterpiece Theatre,” with scant attempt to disguise recycled locations and insert shots. Composer Niel Argo’s maudlin synthesizer score sounds like a Casio keyboard stuck in “funeral dirge” demo mode."

The Los Angeles Times wrote "Good intentions go just so far when a movie is hobbled by such risible, place holder dialogue, contrived plot points, wildly uneven performances and awkward camera work." The Los Angeles Times also said "At least the cage fighting scenes feel authentic."
