= Confessions of a Pit Fighter =

2005 film by Art Camacho

- Theatrical release poster
- Directed by: Art Camacho
- Written by: Art Camacho; R. Ellis Frazier
- Produced by: Mike Karkeh; Todd Chamberlain; Bob Dziadkowiec; Hector Echavarria; R. Ellis Frazier; Timothy Harron
- Starring: Hector Echavarria; Armand Assante; Flavor Flav; John Savage; James Russo; Quinton Jackson
- Cinematography: Curtis Petersen
- Edited by: Chris McGuinness
- Music by: Geoff Levin; Ricardo Veiga
- Production companies: Alliance Group Entertainment; Mike Karkeh Productions
- Distributed by: Lions Gate Entertainment
- Release date: 2005
- Running time: 99 minutes
- Country: United States
- Language: English

Confessions of a Pit Fighter is a 2005 American martial arts action film directed by Art Camacho and starring Hector Echavarria, Armand Assante, Flavor Flav, James Russo and John Savage. It was filmed in Los Angeles, California and produced by Alliance Group Entertainment. It was distributed in by Lions Gate Entertainment.

== Synopsis ==
The embattled mixed martial arts expert, Eddie Castillo, is released from jail after swearing to never enter the pit fighting ring again. However, after his brother is killed in the ring by a vicious new fighter, Eddie goes on a quest for revenge. His journey takes him through the depths of the underground pit fighting circuit, where he finds people like Lucky, who help him; while others, such as the nefarious Argento will stop at nothing to see Eddie fail.

== Cast ==
- Hector Echavarria as Eddie Castillo
- Armand Assante as Argento
- Gizelle D'Cole as Gizelle
- James Russo as Sharkey
- Flavor Flav as "Lucky"
- John Savage as McGee
- Troy Aguayo as Ivan
- Quinton Jackson as Fighter
- Gustavo Cardozo as Fighter

== Reception ==
Like many Direct-to-DVD movies, Confessions of a Pit Fighter was largely ignored by all major reviewers, and the few who bother review, pointed the lack of creativity of the story.
