= James Russo =

American actor (born 1953)

- Born: James Vincent Russo; April 23, 1953 (age 73); New York City, U.S.
- Education: New York University
- Occupation: Actor
- Years active: 1977–present
- Spouse: Bettina Russo (m. 1995; div. 2020)
- Children: 2

James Vincent Russo (born April 23, 1953) is an American film and television actor. He has appeared in over 150 films in three decades.

== Early life ==
Russo was born in New York City to an Italian father and a German mother. A graduate of the High School of Art and Design and New York University (NYU), he wrote and starred in the prize-winning short film The Candy Store. Before his first break in acting, he drove for a cab company, worked as a construction worker and a gravedigger.

== Career ==
Russo's first role in his acting career was in the 1981 made-for-television film Chicago Story. He then went on to star in many hit films of the 1980s.

His big break came in the form of a small role in the 1982 comedy film Fast Times at Ridgemont High, as a convenience store robber. In 1984, he appeared in Beverly Hills Cop as Mikey Tandino, a friend of Axel Foley who is murdered. That same year he starred in The Cotton Club and played small-time hood Bugsy in Sergio Leone's Once Upon a Time in America. Another major role was as a brutal rapist in the 1986 drama Extremities, opposite Farrah Fawcett. He starred in the 1988 drama-suspense-thriller film Freeway.

Russo's film roles in the 1990s include State of Grace (1990), A Kiss Before Dying (1991), and My Own Private Idaho (1991). Russo was a co-lead in Abel Ferrara's Dangerous Game (1993) alongside Madonna and Harvey Keitel. He also had roles in the 1994 Western Bad Girls, the 1997 films The Postman, and Donnie Brasco. In 2009 he had a small role in Michael Mann's Public Enemies as a member of John Dillinger's gang.

In 2003, Russo was reunited with his co-star from The Postman, Kevin Costner, in the Western film Open Range. He made guest appearances in many TV dramas and films, including The Equalizer, Miami Vice, CSI, CSI: Miami, and Las Vegas.

In the summer of 2009, Russo starred in the psychological thriller 7E with Brendan Sexton III, John Savage and Natasha Lyonne. The film was released on December 10, 2013. Russo had a supporting role in Quentin Tarantino's 2012 film Django Unchained.

In 2011, Russo provided video game voice talent for Rage and provided additional voice work for Star Wars: The Old Republic.

He appeared in the music video for Bastille's 2013 song "Of the Night". In 2024, he appeared in frequent collaborator Kevin Costner’s latest project, Horizon: An American Saga – Chapter 1 as store owner Abel Naughton.

== Filmography ==
=== Film ===
| Year | Title | Role | Notes |
|---|---|---|---|
| 1982 | A Stranger Is Watching | Ronald Thompson | |
| 1982 | Fast Times at Ridgemont High | Robber | |
| 1982 | Vortex | Anthony Demmer | |
| 1983 | Exposed | Nick | |
| 1984 | Once Upon a Time in America | Bugsy | |
| 1984 | Beverly Hills Cop | Mikey Tandino | |
| 1984 | The Cotton Club | Vince Hood | |
| 1986 | Extremities | Joe | |
| 1987 | China Girl | Alby | |
| 1988 | The Blue Iguana | Reno | |
| 1988 | Freeway | Frank Quinn | |
| 1989 | The Belt | Vittorio De Simone | |
| 1989 | The Vineyard | Teddy | |
| 1989 | We're No Angels | Bobby | |
| 1990 | State of Grace | DeMarco | |
| 1991 | A Kiss Before Dying | Dan Corelli | |
| 1991 | My Own Private Idaho | Richard Waters | |
| 1991 | Cold Heaven | Daniel Corvin | |
| 1991 | Intimate Stranger | Nick Ciccini | TV movie |
| 1992 | In the Shadow of a Killer | Charlie Van | TV movie |
| 1992 | Illicit Behavior | Bill Tanner | |
| 1993 | Desperate Rescue: The Cathy Mahone Story | Don Feeney | TV movie |
| 1993 | Trauma | Capt. Travis | |
| 1993 | Da Vinci's War | Mintz | |
| 1993 | Double Deception | Jon Kane | TV movie |
| 1993 | Dangerous Game | Francis Burns | |
| 1994 | Bad Girls | Kid Jarrett | |
| 1995 | The Secretary | Ted Burke | TV movie |
| 1995 | Panther | Rodgers | |
| 1995 | Condition Red | Dan Cappelli | |
| 1995 | The Set Up | Kliff | TV movie |
| 1996 | Livers Ain't Cheap | Rupert Little | |
| 1996 | American Strays | Eddie | |
| 1996 | No Way Home | Tommy | |
| 1996 | Small Time | Jerry | |
| 1997 | Donnie Brasco | Paulie | |
| 1997 | Laws of Deception | Gino Carlucci | |
| 1997 | The Girl Gets Moe | Brannagin | |
| 1997 | Under Oath | Warren Erickson | |
| 1997 | The Postman | Idaho | |
| 1998 | Butter | Juke Box Danny | |
| 1998 | Heist | Nick the Stick | |
| 1998 | My Husband's Secret Life | Sal Bianculli | TV movie |
| 1998 | Detour | Ziggy Rotella | Video |
| 1998 | Fait Accompli | Luc | |
| 1998 | Charades | Max Targenville | |
| 1999 | BitterSweet | Joe Massa | Video |
| 1999 | Jimmy Zip | Otis Campbell | |
| 1999 | The Ninth Gate | Bernie | |
| 1999 | Diamonds | Damian | |
| 1999 | Paper Bullets | John Rourke | |
| 2000 | Sonic Impact | Agent Nick Halton | |
| 2000 | Deep Core | Darryl Simmons | |
| 2000 | The Unscarred | Mickey Vernon | |
| 2000 | Bad Guys | John Tykor | |
| 2000 | Hidden War | Matt Forman | |
| 2001 | Pendulum | Edward Mills | |
| 2001 | Double Deception | Snake | |
| 2002 | Shattered Lies | Smiler | |
| 2002 | The House Next Door | Carl Schmidt | |
| 2002 | Redemption | Capt. Grill | Video |
| 2002 | Against All Evidence | Mr. Quinn | TV movie |
| 2003 | Stealing Sinatra | Frank Sinatra | |
| 2003 | Short | Agent (voice) | Short |
| 2003 | A Good Night to Die | Roy | |
| 2003 | Paris | Leon King | |
| 2003 | The Box | Frank Miles | |
| 2003 | Open Range | Marshal Poole | |
| 2004 | Target | Donovan | |
| 2004 | Fallacy | - | |
| 2005 | One Among Us | Ryan Brannigan (the Ex-Cop) | |
| 2005 | Come as You Are | Benny | |
| 2005 | Confessions of a Pit Fighter | Sharkey | |
| 2006 | All In | Dr. Pennington | |
| 2006 | Satanic | Eddie | |
| 2006 | Shut Up and Shoot! | David Sanchez | |
| 2006 | Blackwater Valley Exorcism | The Bishop | Video |
| 2006 | Cut Off | Gonzo | |
| 2007 | Chill | Detective Defazio | Video |
| 2007 | Blue Lake Massacre | Sheriff Jack | |
| 2007 | Machine | Butch | |
| 2007 | The Pink Conspiracy | Cox | |
| 2007 | The Hit | Mr. Santucci | |
| 2007 | On the Doll | Janitor | |
| 2008 | Kings of the Evening | Ramsey | |
| 2008 | Stiletto | Engelhart | |
| 2008 | Deadwater | Commander Combs | Video |
| 2008 | Break | The Father | |
| 2008 | Born of Earth | Tom Reeser | |
| 2008 | Shoot First and Pray You Live | Bob McGurk | |
| 2008 | Dark World | Charlie | |
| 2008 | Little Red Devil | Mr. Trundell | |
| 2009 | Charlie Valentine | Rocco | |
| 2009 | Never Surrender | Jimmy | |
| 2009 | Public Enemies | Walter Dietrich | |
| 2009 | Dreams and Shadows | John Brunette | |
| 2010 | Dark Woods | Sheriff Demming | |
| 2010 | Boy Wonder | Larry Childs | |
| 2010 | Love Sick Diaries | Lorenzo De'mon | |
| 2010 | One in the Gun | Jimmy | |
| 2011 | Good God Bad Dog | Peter Elias | Short |
| 2011 | Miss Bala | Jimmy | |
| 2011 | Yellow Rock | Max Dietrich | |
| 2011 | The Dragon Warrior | Claudius | |
| 2012 | Django Unchained | Dicky Speck | |
| 2012 | Revan | Stone | |
| 2013 | Samuel Bleak | Charles Bleak | |
| 2013 | Five Thirteen | Agent Acevedo | |
| 2013 | Chavez Cage of Glory | Tony | |
| 2013 | 7E | Sam | |
| 2014 | Perfect Sisters | Steve Bowman | |
| 2014 | Strike One | Paul Fairfield | |
| 2015 | American Justice | Agent Cobb | |
| 2015 | Daytona | Frank Daytona | Short |
| 2015 | Voiceless | Pastor Gil | |
| 2015 | Black Mass | Agent Scott Gariola | |
| 2016 | Vigilante Diaries | Mr. Hanover | |
| 2016 | Paid in Full | John Desmond | |
| 2016 | Code of Honor | Vincent Romano | |
| 2016 | The Bronx Bull | Rocky Graziano | |
| 2016 | 1st Strike | Paul Fairfield | |
| 2017 | The Broken Ones | Joe Murphy | |
| 2017 | The Fifth Borough | Detective Ricci | Short |
| 2018 | A Dog & Pony Show | Banker Pete Melnick | |
| 2018 | Living Among Us | Aaron | |
| 2018 | Desolate | Duke Stone | |
| 2018 | Not a Stranger | Bob Madden | |
| 2018 | The Terrorist | Agent Bradley Scott | |
| 2018 | Disorder | - | Short |
| 2019 | The Great Alaskan Race | Wild Bill | |
| 2019 | Possession Diaries | Father Brien | |
| 2019 | Badland | Fred Quaid | |
| 2019 | A Shot for Justice | James White | |
| 2020 | The Big Shot | Mr. Langdon | |
| 2020 | Final Kill | Bob | |
| 2020 | 5th Borough | Det. Ricci | |
| 2020 | A Soldier's Revenge | Walsh | |
| 2020 | Woe | Uncle Pete | |
| 2020 | Chronicle of a Serial Killer | Peter Brown | |
| 2020 | The Penitent Thief | Castor | |
| 2020 | Welcome Home | Ben Jones | |
| 2021 | Take Back | Schmidt | |
| 2021 | Cerebrum | Kirk Davis | |
| 2021 | Flag Day | Lead Biker | |
| 2022 | Pig Killer | Rat | |
| 2022 | Starf*cker | Carl | |
| 2023 | Condition of Return | Mike Stafford | |
| 2023 | The Allnighter | Walter | |
| 2023 | MobKing | Don Dominic Sasso | |
| 2023 | Inside Man | Garo Balikian | |
| 2023 | Replica | Joe | |
| 2023 | Among Wolves | Thomas Barclay | |
| 2024 | Horizon: An American Saga – Chapter 1 | Abel Naughton | |
| 2024 | Silent Partners | Frankie Cutts | |
| 2025 | Run | Eddie | |

=== Television ===
| Year | Title | Role | Notes |
|---|---|---|---|
| 1981 | Chicago Story | - | Episode: "Chicago Story" |
| 1982 | McClain's Law | Vinny Lo Cicero | Episode: "What Patric Doesn't Know" |
| 1985 | The Equalizer | Police Detective | Episode: "China Rain" |
| 1985 | Miami Vice | Frank Sacco | Episode: "The Prodigal Son" |
| 1987 | Crime Story | Nat Martino | Episode: "Ground Zero" |
| 1987 | Un siciliano in Sicilia | Giuseppe | Main Cast |
| 1988 | Friday the 13th: The Series | Janos Korda | Episode: "Symphony in B-Sharp" |
| 1991 | Gabriel's Fire | Charles Crowley | Episode: "Belly of the Beast" |
| 1997 | Dellaventura | Tommy Bats | Episode: "Above Reproach" |
| 1997 | C-16: FBI | Frank Saretti | Episode: "Eight Pounds of Pressure" |
| 2000 | Falcone | Victor Mura | Episode: "Pilot" |
| 2004 | CSI: Crime Scene Investigation | Sinclair | Episode: "Getting Off" |
| 2004 | Without a Trace | Michael Krauss | Episode: "Lost and Found" |
| 2005 | Joan of Arcadia | James Karon | Episode: "Trial and Error" |
| 2006 | Broken Trail | Captain Billy Fender | Episode: "Part: 1 & 2" |
| 2006 | Las Vegas | Warren Pemberton | Episode: "The Story of Owe" |
| 2006–2008 | CSI: Miami | Joey Salucci | Guest Cast: Season 4 & 7 |
| 2008 | The Capture of the Green River Killer | Jeb Dallas | Episode: "Part: 1 & 2" |
| 2009 | Numb3rs | John Curtis | Episode: "12:01 AM" |
| 2009 | Dark Blue | Robert Franzine | Episode: "Pilot" |
| 2010 | Hawaii Five-0 | Frank Salvo | Episode: "Malama Ka Aina (Respect the Land)" |
| 2012–2013 | Vegas | Anthony 'Red' Cervelli | Recurring Cast |
| 2014–2015 | Chicago Fire | Papa Lullo | Recurring Cast: Season 3 |
| 2017 | The Deuce | - | Episode: "The Principle Is All" |
| 2018 | The Neighborhood | Crazy Chris | Main Cast |
| 2020–2021 | Gravesend | Crazy Chris | Main Cast: Season 1, Guest: Season 2 |
| 2025–present | Tulsa King | "Quiet" Ray Renzetti | Recurring role (season 3); main cast (season 4) |

=== Video games ===
| Year | Title | Role | Notes |
|---|---|---|---|
| 2011 | Rage | Voice Talent | |
| 2011 | Star Wars: The Old Republic | Additional Voices | Grouped under "Additional Voices provided by" |

=== Stage ===
Off-Broadway
| Year | Title | Role |
|---|---|---|
| 1982 | Extremities | Raul |

=== Music videos ===
| Year | Title | Artist |
|---|---|---|
| 2013 | "Of the Night" | Bastille |

== Awards ==
| Year | Association | Award | Nominated work | Result |
|---|---|---|---|---|
| 1983 | Theatre World Award | | Extremities | Won |
| 2004 | San Diego Film Festival | Best Actor | The Box | Won |
