= The Toxic Avenger (franchise) =

American superhero comedy franchise

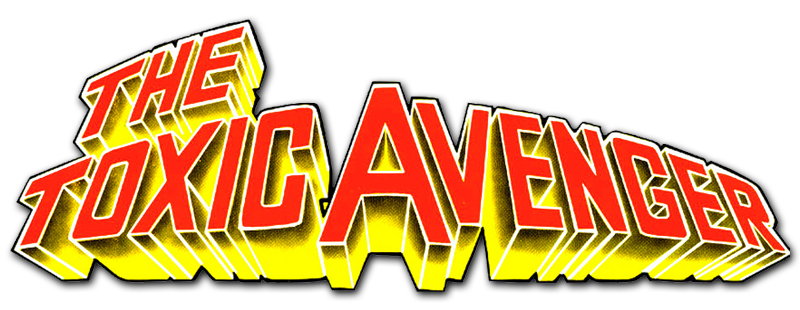
- Official franchise logo
- Created by: Lloyd Kaufman
- Original work: The Toxic Avenger (1984)
- Owner: Troma Entertainment
- Years: 1984–present

Print publications
- Comics: Marvel Comics: The Toxic Avenger (1991–1992); Toxic Crusaders (1992); Ahoy Comics: The Toxic Avenger (2024–2025); The Toxic Avenger Pinup Special (2025); Toxie Team-Up (2025); The Toxic Avenger Comics (2025); Toxic Crusaders (2025)

Films and television
- Films: Original series: The Toxic Avenger (1984); The Toxic Avenger Part II (1989); The Toxic Avenger Part III: The Last Temptation of Toxie (1989); Citizen Toxie: The Toxic Avenger IV (2000); Reboot: The Toxic Avenger (2023)
- Television series: Toxic Crusaders (1991)

Theatrical presentations
- Musical: The Toxic Avenger

Games
- Video games: Toxic Crusaders (1992); Toxic Crusaders (2025)

The Toxic Avenger is an American superhero comedy media franchise created by Lloyd Kaufman. It originated with the 1984 film of the same name and continued through three film sequels, a stage musical, a comic book series from Marvel Comics and Ahoy Comics, a video game, and an animated television series.

Two less successful sequels, The Toxic Avenger Part II and The Toxic Avenger Part III: The Last Temptation of Toxie, were filmed as one. Kaufman realized that he had shot far too much footage for one film and re-edited it into two. A third independent sequel was also released, titled Citizen Toxie: The Toxic Avenger IV. An animated children's television series spin-off, Toxic Crusaders, featured Toxie as the leader of a team of mutated superheroes who fought against evil alien polluters. The animated series was short lived and quickly cancelled. In 2019, it was announced that Legendary Pictures would be making a reboot of the film, with Kaufman and director/producer Michael Herz serving as producers, and Macon Blair serving as writer and director.

The films generally follow the heroic exploits of Melvin Junko, a weak and skinny janitor turned into the deformed and mutated superhero, the Toxic Avenger, or "Toxie", by exposure to toxic chemicals. As Toxie, he fights different crimes in Tromaville, New Jersey which is described to be the "Toxic Chemical Capital of the World". All films in the series were released by Troma Entertainment, known for producing low budget B-movies with campy concepts and gruesome violence. Virtually ignored upon its first release, The Toxic Avenger caught on with filmgoers after a long and successful midnight movie engagement at the famed Bleecker Street Cinemas in New York City in late 1985. It eventually came to be regarded as a cult classic.

== Films ==
Film	U.S. release date	Director(s)	Screenwriter(s)	Producer(s)
Original series
The Toxic Avenger	April 4, 1984	Lloyd Kaufman and Michael Herz	Joe Ritter	Lloyd Kaufman & Michael Herz
The Toxic Avenger Part II	February 24, 1989	Lloyd Kaufman and Michael Herz	Gay Partington Terry and Lloyd Kaufman	Lloyd Kaufman, Michael Herz & Jeffrey W. Sass
The Toxic Avenger Part III: The Last Temptation of Toxie	November 24, 1989	Lloyd Kaufman and Michael Herz	Lloyd Kaufman and Michael Herz	Lloyd Kaufman & Michael Herz
Citizen Toxie: The Toxic Avenger IV	October 8, 2000	Lloyd Kaufman	Lloyd Kaufman, Michael Herz, Patrick Cassidy, Trent Haaga and Gabriel Friedman	Lloyd Kaufman & Michael Herz
Reboot
The Toxic Avenger	August 29, 2025	Macon Blair	Macon Blair	Mary Parent, Alex García, Lloyd Kaufman & Michael Herz

=== Original series ===
==== The Toxic Avenger (1984) ====
The Toxic Avenger is born when mop boy Melvin is forced into a vat of toxic waste and gains powerful new abilities. With them he rids Tromaville of criminals and thugs.

==== The Toxic Avenger Part II (1989) ====
The Toxic Avenger is tricked into traveling to Tokyo to search for his estranged father, leaving Tromaville open to complete domination by an evil corporation.

==== The Toxic Avenger Part III: The Last Temptation of Toxie (1989) ====
Toxie finds he has nothing to do as a superhero, as he has ridden his city of evil. He decides to go to work for a major corporation, which he discovers may be the evilest of all his adversaries.

==== Citizen Toxie: The Toxic Avenger IV (2000) ====
The Toxic Avenger must defend his friends from his own evil alternate universe doppelgänger, The Noxious Offender.

=== Reboot ===
==== The Toxic Avenger (2023) ====
Based on the 1984 cult classic of the same name. Set in a fantasy world following Winston, a stereotypical weakling who works as a janitor at Garb-X health club and is diagnosed with a terminal illness that can only be cured by an expensive treatment that his greedy, power hungry employer refuses to pay for. After deciding to take matters into his own hands and rob his company, Winston falls into a pit of toxic waste and is transformed into a deformed monster that sets out to do good and get back at all the people who have wronged him. On December 10, 2018, it was announced that Legendary Pictures had the rights to reboot the film, with Kaufman and Herz set to serve as the film's producers. In March 2019, Macon Blair was announced to write and direct the upcoming reboot. In December 2020, Peter Dinklage is set to star. In April 2021, Jacob Tremblay also joined the cast with Taylour Paige, who joined in May 2021. On June 12, 2021, it was announced that Kevin Bacon had joined the film as the villain followed by Julia Davis and Elijah Wood on June 16, 2021.

The film premiered at Fantastic Fest on September 21, 2023, and was theatrically released by Cineverse in the United States on August 29, 2025.

== Television ==
=== Toxic Crusaders (1991) ===
A group of mutants fight against the pollution-loving alien Dr. Killemoff in the fictional city of Tromaville, led by Toxie, a nerd-turned-superhero.

=== T.V. Guest Appearances ===
Toxie guest starred on The Last Drive-in with Joe Bob Briggs, played by James T. Mills.

== Cast and crew ==
=== Principal cast ===
Key
- A ^{Y} indicates the actor portrayed the role of a younger version of the character.
- An ^{O} indicates a role as an older version of the character.
- A ^{V} indicates the actor or actress lent only his or her voice for his or her film character.
- An ^{M} indicates the model served as a body double, with the actor or actress's likeness superimposed onto the model.
- An ^{L} indicates the actor or actress lent only their likeness for his or her film character.
- An ^{P} indicates an appearance through a photographic still.
- An ^{A} indicates an appearance through archival footage or audio.
- A dark gray cell indicates the character was not in the film.

Character	Original series				Animated series	Related film	Reboot
Character	The Toxic Avenger	The Toxic Avenger Part II	The Toxic Avenger Part III: The Last Temptation of Toxie	Citizen Toxie: The Toxic Avenger IV	Toxic Crusaders	Sgt. Kabukiman N.Y.P.D.	The Toxic Avenger
Character	1984	1989	1989	2000	1991	1990	2023
"Toxie" The Toxic Avenger Melvin Ferd Junko III / Winston Gooze	Mark Torgl Mitch Cohen Kenneth Kessler^{V}	John Altamura Ron Fazio^{V}	John Altamura Ron Fazio^{V} Michael J. Kaplan^{Y}	Mark Torgl David Mattey Clyde Lewis^{V}	Rodger Bumpass^{V}	Mentioned	Peter Dinklage Luisa Guerreiro
Sarah / Claire / Yvonne Junko J.J. Doherty	Andree Maranda	Phoebe Legere	Phoebe Legere	Heidi Sjursen	Kath Soucie^{V}		Taylour Paige
Mayor Peter Belgoody Goldberg Satan, Chairman of Apocalypse Inc., Mayor Max Grody Mayor Goldberg Bob Garbinger	R. L. Ryan	Rick Collins	Rick Collins	Ron Jeremy Rick Collins^{C}	Chuck McCann^{V}		Kevin Bacon
Mrs. Ferd Junko	Sarabel Levinson	Jessica Dublin	Jessica Dublin		Susan Silo^{V}		
Cigar Face	Dan Snow	Dan Snow	Dan Snow				
Czar Gaseous Maximus Zosta The Trash Can, Ruler of Smogula	Steven J. Zmed				Patric Zimmerman^{V}		
Bozo Bonehead	Gary Schneider				Hal Rayle^{V}		
Girl in Locker Room	Marisa Tomei						
Leroy	Patrick Kilpatrick						
Ms. Mona Malfaire		Lisa Gaye	Lisa Gaye	Lisa Gaye	Susan Blu^{V}	Lisa Gaye	
Chester of the Lardass Apocalypse Inc. Executive		Joe Fleishaker	Joe Fleishaker	Joe Fleishaker			
Sumo Wrestler Fish Salesman		Lloyd Kaufman^{U}		Lloyd Kaufman^{C}			
Apocalypse Inc. Executive		Michael Jai White	Michael Jai White				
Newscaster		Tsutomu Sekine	Tsutomu Sekine				
Sgt. Kabukiman N.Y.P.D. Sergeant Detective Harry Griswold				Paul Kyrmse		Paul Kyrmse Rick Gianasi^{Y}	
The Narrator				Stan Lee			
President of the United States				Hugh Hefner^{U}^{C}			
God				Hank the Angry Drunken Dwarf			
"Noxie" The Noxious Avenger Evil Melvin Ferd Junko III				David Mattey Clyde Lewis^{V}			
Dr. Flem Hocking				James Gunn			
Kinky Finkelstein				Corey Feldman			
Captain Bender					Hal Rayle^{V}	Noble Lee Lester	
No-Zone					Paul Eiding^{V}		
Major Disaster					Ed Gilbert^{V}		
Captain Fender					John Mariano^{V}		
Junkyard					Gregg Berger^{V}		
Dr. Killemoff					Rodger Bumpass^{V}		
Psycho					Michael J. Pollard^{V}		
Lotus						Susan Byun	
Reverend Snipes						Larry Robinson	
Reginald Stuart						Bill Weeden	
Jughead Jones						Brick Bronsky	
Wade Gooze							Jacob Tremblay
Kissy Sturnevan							Julia Davis
J.J. Doherty Mayor Togar							Sarah Niles
Budd Berserk							Julian Kostov
Fritz Garbinger							Elijah Wood
Guthrie Stockins							David Yow
Thad Barkabus							Jonny Coyne
Shelly Gooze							Rebecca O'Mara

== Other media ==
=== Musical ===
- The Toxic Avenger (musical) – musical based on the film The Toxic Avenger

=== Video game ===
- A Toxic Crusaders video game was released in 1992 for the Nintendo Entertainment System, Game Boy, and Sega Genesis. A new Toxic Crusaders video game will release in December 4th, 2025.

=== Home Video ===
- The Toxic Crusaders: The Series Blu-ray features the first appearance of the animated Toxie in live-action.

== See also ==
- Sgt. Kabukiman N.Y.P.D., film conceived while filming The Toxic Avenger Part II in Japan
- All I Need to Know About Filmmaking I Learned from The Toxic Avenger, autobiographical book
