= Simon Nuchtern =

Belgian-born American filmmaker (born 1936)

- Born: 1936 (age 89–90); Belgium
- Occupation: Filmmaker

Simon Nuchtern (born 1936) is a Belgian-born American filmmaker who is based in New York. He has directed, written, and produced a number of low-budget and independent films since the 1960s.

His films include Cowards (1970), a drama which was screened at the Cannes Film Festival; the 3D horror film Silent Madness (1984); and the action film Savage Dawn (1985), starring Lance Henriksen, George Kennedy, and Karen Black.

Nuchtern was president of August Films (established 1967), a production and post-production company. During the 1970s he was involved in the re-editing of several foreign-shot films prior to their distribution in the United States, notably the controversial Snuff (1976), which was marketed to exploit rumors of the existence of real-life snuff films. Following the dissolution of August Films in 1989, he founded a smaller-scale film and video production company, Katina Productions.

He is married to artist Anna Thornhill.

== Selected filmography ==
Year	Title	Director	Producer	Writer	Notes
1968	The Girl Grabbers	✓	✓	✓	
1969	To Hex with Sex	✓	✓	✓	
1970	Cowards	✓	✓	✓	Reissued as Love-In '72 with new footage.
1972	The Broad Coalition	✓	✓		Alternative titles: What Do I Tell the Boys at the Station? and That Man Is Pregnant!
1976	The Bodyguard	✓			Recut U.S. edition of Japanese film Karate Kiba (1973); directed new prologue.
1976	Snuff	✓			Filmed in Argentina by Michael and Roberta Findlay as The Slaughter (1971); directed new epilogue for reissue (uncredited).
1981	Strong Medicine		✓		Directed by Richard Foreman.
1984	New York Nights	✓			Alternative title: Shackin' Up. Loosely based on Arthur Schnitzler's La Ronde.
1984	Silent Madness	✓	✓		Filmed in 3D.
1985	Savage Dawn	✓			
1988	Rejuvenatrix			✓	Directed by Brian Thomas Jones.
