= Scott Leva =

American stunt performer

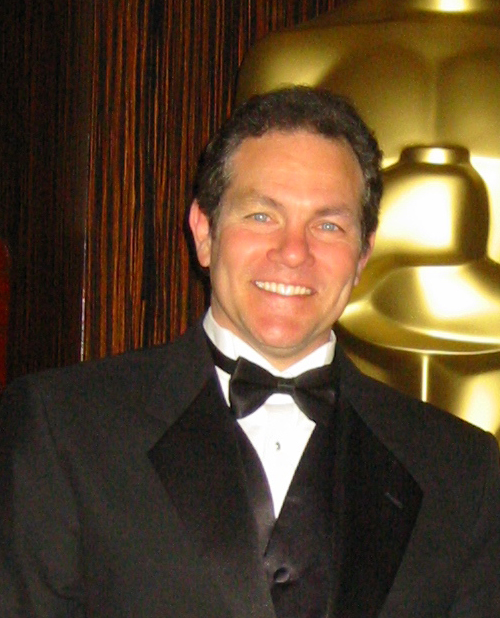
- Leva in 2006
- Occupations: Stuntman, stunt coordinator

Scott Leva is a Academy Award-winning stuntman, stunt coordinator and actor who entered stunt work in the 1970s.

== Biography ==
=== Spider-Man ===
In 1985, Leva was tapped by Cannon Films & Joseph Zito (who was the 2nd director to replace Tobe Hooper as being the first director attached for Spider-Man) to play Spider-Man in their adaptation of the comics. He was also the actor on the first photographic cover of a Spider-Man comic book, appearing as Peter Parker, half-way in costume, on The Amazing Spider-Man, #262 (cover date March 1985). He can be seen in costume as Spider-Man, on the blooper reel for the 2000 film X-Men, on which he served as a stunt-coordinator.

=== Safety equipment designer ===
After a friend died doing a high fall, Leva started to tinker with the standard airbags used by stunt performers and eventually designed an airbag with a different structure. The older airbags had a tendency to throw a stunt performer if they didn't hit the bag perfectly, the new bag uses a different arrangements of air bladders and a less slippery top layer to help the performer to stay on the bag. He was awarded an Academy Award for Technical Achievement for this design.

== Awards ==
- 2003 World Stunt Awards Nominated for Best High Work for a 125-foot fall onto the top of a car on Ballistic: Ecks vs. Sever
- 2003 World Stunt Awards Nominated for Best Overall Stunt Performer as stunt coordinator on Ballistic: Ecks vs. Sever
- 2006 Academy Awards Science and Technical Oscar for his design of a safer air bag for high fall stunt work

== Filmography highlights ==
=== Stunts or Stunt Coordinator ===
- Scream Queens (2008) - Episode 3 (stunts)
- Changeling (2008) (utility stunts)
- Terminator: The Sarah Connor Chronicles (stunt rigger) (utility stunts)
- Dexter (stunt rigger) (1 episode, 2007)
- 2007 Taurus World Stunt Awards (2007) (TV) (utility stunts)
- Hannah Montana (stunt rigger)
- Letters from Iwo Jima (2006) (utility stunts)
- Flags of Our Fathers (2006) (assistant stunt coordinator)
- Crank (2006) (stunt safety)
- Zoom (2006) (stunts)
- World Trade Center (2006) (stunts)
- Everybody Hates Chris (2005) TV series (stunt rigger)
- Lemony Snicket's A Series of Unfortunate Events (2004) (stunts)
- Desperate Housewives (2004) TV series (stunt rigger)
- Collateral (2004) (stunts)
- World's Finest (2004) (aerial stunt effects coordinator) (stunt coordinator)
- 2003 ABC World Stunt Awards (2003) (TV) (utility stunts)
- Taken (2002) (stunts)
- Ballistic: Ecks vs. Sever (2002) (assistant stunt coordinator) (stunts: high fall)
- Star Trek: Enterprise (2001) TV series (stunt double)
- The Best Damn Sports Show Period (2001) TV series (utility stunts)
- X-Men (2000) (stunt coordinator: second unit) (stunts)
- Timecop (1997) TV series (stunts)
- Buffy the Vampire Slayer (1997) TV series (stunts)
- Space Truckers (1996) (stunt double) (stunts)
- Nash Bridges (1996) TV series (stunt performer)
- Baywatch Nights (1995) TV series (stunts)
- Sliders (1995) TV series (stunts)
- OP Center (1995) (TV) (stunts)
- Star Trek: Voyager (1995) TV series (stunts)
- Lois & Clark: The New Adventures of Superman (1993) TV series (stunts)
- Mighty Morphin Power Rangers (1993) TV series (stunt double)
- Robin Hood: Men in Tights (1993) (stunts)
- Star Trek: Deep Space Nine (1993) TV series (stunts)
- Hook (1991) (stunts)
- Star Trek VI: The Undiscovered Country (1991) (stunts)
- The Rocketeer (1991) (stunts)
- The Toxic Avenger Part III: The Last Temptation of Toxie (1989) (stunt coordinator) (stunts)
- Police Academy 6: City Under Siege (1989) (stunts)
- The Toxic Avenger Part II (1989) (stunt coordinator)
- Troma's War (1988) (stunt coordinator)
- Prime Evil (1988) (stunt double) (stunts)
- The Big Giver (1988) (stunt coordinator)
- Star Trek: The Next Generation (1987) TV series (stunts)
- Beauty and the Beast (1987) TV series (stunts)
- Prizzi's Honor (1985) (stunts)
- The Toxic Avenger (1985) (stunt coordinator)
- Desperately Seeking Susan (1985) (stunt coordinator)
- Turk 182 (1985) (stunts)
- The Cotton Club (1984) (stunts)
- Splash (1984) (stunts)
- The World According to Garp (1982) (stunts)
- Fort Apache, The Bronx (1981) (stunts)
- Superman (1978) (stunts)

=== Actor ===
==== Film ====
- The Toxic Avenger (1984, as policeman, uncredited)
- Invaders from Mars (1986, as Marine officer)
- The Toxic Avenger Part II (1989, as the Dark Rider, uncredited)
- Sweet Justice (1993, as River Goon)
- Private Wars (1993, as Mrs. Dominick's Son)
- Stranger by Night (1994, as Bobby's Father, (flashbacks), uncredited)
- To the Limit (1995, as Carlo)
- Back to Back (1996, as Officer Williams)
- Monkey Business (1998, as Bankrobber 1
- The Base (1999, as Front Gate MP #1)
- X-Men, (2000, as Waterboy #2)
- Ballistic: Ecks vs. Sever, (2002, as Lone Sniper)
- Red Eye, (2005, as Keefe's Bodyguard)
- Changeling (2008, as Mountie)

==== Television ====
- Dynasty (1983, 1 episode, as waiter)
- Star Trek: The Next Generation (1989, Episode: Unnatural Selection, as Command Division Officer)
- Santa Barbara (1991, 1 episode, as Thug No. 1)
- Star Trek: Deep Space Nine (1996, Episode: To the Death, as Ramirez, uncredited)
- Star Trek: Voyager (1996, Episode: Remember, as Fredick, uncredited)
- Diagnosis: Murder (1996, Episode: A Model Murder, as Ray Donovan)
- Lois & Clark: The New Adventures of Superman (1997, Episode: Sex, Lies and Videotape, as Thug)
- Star Trek: Deep Space Nine (1997, Episode: Soldiers of the Empire, as Ortakin)
- Nash Bridges (1999, Episode: Power Play, as Mobster 2)
- Star Trek: Deep Space Nine (1999, Episode: What You Leave Behind, as Jem'Hadar Guard, uncredited)
- Relic Hunter (1999, Episode: Transformation, as Tough Hombre #1)
- The Sarah Silverman Program (2010, Episode: A Slip Slope, as Fireman #4)

=== Second Unit Director or Assistant Director ===
- Ritual (2001/I) (second unit director)
- Pilgrim (2000) (second unit director)
- If Dog Rabbit (1999) (second unit director)
- The Heist (1999) (second unit director)
- Southern Cross (1999) (second unit director)
- Gangster World (1998) (TV) (second unit director)
- Mars (1998) (second unit director)
- Acts of Betrayal (1997) (second unit director)
- Mercenary (1997) (TV) (second unit director)
- The Journey: Absolution (1997) (second unit director)
- Mercenary II: Thick & Thin (1997) (TV) (second unit director)

=== Director ===
- The Greatest Show Ever (2007) (TV)
