= Satan's Bed (1965 film) =

1965 American film by Marshall Smith Tamijian

- Directed by: Marshall Smith; Tamijian
- Starring: Yoko Ono; Val Avery; Glen Nielson; Gene Wesson
- Cinematography: Michael Findlay
- Edited by: Michael Findlay
- Release date: 1965
- Running time: 72 minutes
- Country: United States
- Language: English

Satan's Bed is a 1965 American exploitation film directed by Marshall Smith and "Tamijian", and starring Yoko Ono in her acting debut, alongside Val Avery, Glen Nielson, Gene Wesson, and Roberta Findlay. Findlay also oversaw the lighting for the film, while her husband, filmmaker Michael Findlay, served as cinematographer and editor.

Shot in black-and-white, Satan's Bed is made up of an earlier film by Tamijian titled Judas City, with additional footage and characters added in.

== Cast ==
- Yoko Ono as Ito, the girlfriend of a drug dealer
- Val Avery
- Glen Nielson
- Gene Wesson
- Roberta Findlay

== Home media ==
Satan's Bed was released on DVD by Something Weird Video as a double feature with the 1968 film Scare Their Pants Off.
