= Shriek of the Mutilated =

- Theatrical poster
- Directed by: Michael Findlay
- Screenplay by: Ed Adlum; Ed Kelleher
- Produced by: Ed Adlum
- Starring: Alan Brock; Jennifer Stock; Michael Harris; Tawm Ellis; Darcy Brown; Tom Grail
- Cinematography: Roberta Findlay
- Edited by: Michael Findlay
- Distributed by: American Films Ltd.
- Release dates: July 18, 1974 (Texas); December 4, 1974 (California)
- Running time: 86 minutes
- Country: United States
- Language: English

Shriek of the Mutilated (also known as Mutilated and Scream of the Snowbeast) is a 1974 American horror film directed by Michael Findlay, and starring Alan Brock, Jennifer Stock, and Michael Harris. It follows a group of university students who, with their professor, visit a remote island in upstate New York to investigate sightings of a Yeti-like creature.

== Plot ==
Professor Ernst Prell, a Yeti investigator, is leading four graduate students on a field trip into the mountains: Keith, Karen, Tom and Lynn. The night before the trip, the professor invites Keith to dinner, where he samples an exotic dish named "gin sung". The rest of Prell's students attend an off-campus party where they encounter a former student, Spencer St. Clair, who tells everyone the story of Prell's last expedition, which only he and the professor survived.

After the party, Spencer continues drinking and, upon returning home, fights with his wife and slits her throat. Afterwards, he climbs into the bathtub and is killed by his struggling wife, who dumps a toaster into the bath, electrocuting him.

In the morning, Prell travels with his students to Boot Island, where his friend Dr. Karl Werner lives with his mute Native American manservant, Laughing Crow. Werner has recently seen the Yeti and posits that he was marooned there by melting winter ice. The group dine on "gin sung" then go to sleep after one of the students, Tom, sings a song about the Yeti.

The next day, the group begins their search in the woods. Tom sneaks off to go hunting and is killed by the Yeti. They search for Tom the next morning, but Karen finds only his rifle and severed leg. Lynn becomes frightened by something in Werner's greenhouse, runs into the woods and is killed by the Yeti.

The students discover the house phone is out of order. The professor decides to use Tom's leg as bait to lure the Yeti into a trap. The plan fails, and Prell returns to the house claiming he was knocked down by the monster, who escaped with the leg. Prell decides to try again, using Lynn's body as bait. Karen tries to hide it in the greenhouse, where she discovers the rest of Tom's body and passes out. When she awakens, Prell tells her it must have been a dream, but she doesn't believe him, leading them back to the greenhouse where they uncover Lynn's body.

Disgusted that Prell intends to use Lynn's body as bait, Karen reluctantly agrees to help by taking photos, under the condition that they all leave the island. Both Prell and Keith agree. The professor ties Lynn's body to a tree and sets the trap. The Yeti appears and Keith tracks it by the sound of its heartbeat but realizes the sound is coming from a nearby speaker before he is knocked out.

At the house, Laughing Crow is listening to a recording of the heartbeat. Prell and Werner are members of a cannibalistic cult, using the Yeti scam as a way to lure in victims, and the Yeti is actually Werner in disguise. While Karen is asleep, Keith returns to the house and discovers Prell and Werner discussing what to do with her. Werner thinks they should kill her, but Prell says that the cult's code stipulates there be no bruises and that she must die of fright.

Keith orders them at gunpoint to put their hands up, to no avail. He shoots, but the shells are blanks, and he is knocked unconscious by Laughing Crow. Still asleep, Karen wakes to a growling noise and sees the Yeti running toward the house. She flees and ends up trapped in a bathroom, where she dies of fright after finding Laughing Crow holding a knife.

Keith wakes up, sneaks off and tries to escape in the van, which gets stuck in the mud while he tries to hide from the party guests' funeral procession. He runs off and manages to flag down a cop who takes him back to the house.

Prell and Werner salute the party guests and hosts, toasting previous schemes that provided corpses. Keith returns with the policeman, only to discover that he, too, is a cannibal. Prell and Werner explain that the "gin sung" Keith has eaten is actually human flesh, and they invite him to join their cult. They bring in Karen's body, and Laughing Crow, brandishing an electric carving knife, speaks for the first time, saying, "Mr. Henshaw—white meat or dark?"

== Cast ==
- Alan Brock as Dr. Ernst Prell
- Jennifer Stock as Karen Hunter
- Tawm Ellis as Dr. Karl Werner
- Michael Harris as Keith Henshaw
- Darcy Brown as Lynn Kelly
- Jack Neubeck as Tom Nash
- Tom Grail as Spencer St. Claire
- Luci Brandt as April St. Claire
- Ivan Agar as Laughing Crow
- Marina Stefan as Party Hostess
- Harriet McFaul as Girl at party
- Dwight Marfield as Station Attendant
- Jimmy Silva as Policeman
- Warren D'Oyly-Rhind as Waiter

== Production ==
=== Development ===
The husband and wife directorial team Michael Findlay and Roberta Findlay began collaborating on films together in the 1960s, directing, producing, and filming low-budget horror, exploitation, and pornographic films. Prior to Shriek of the Mutilated, Roberta had served as cinematographer on the horror film Invasion of the Blood Farmers (1972), directed by Ed Adlum.

Adlum co-wrote the screenplay for Shriek of the Mutilated with Ed Kelleher, and pitched the project to Michael Findlay, whom they hired as director. By Adlum's account, on the first day of shooting while completing the opening title sequence, Michael suffered a nervous breakdown; Adlum recalled in a 2008 interview:

What happened was, Michael had some troubles in the head. I don't want to be disrespectful of his memory. I thought the world of the man, but he was troubled. Michael got really troubled the very first day we started filming. Just me and him, me in a gorilla suit cavorting in the trees. It was background footage for the titles. Michael got very squirrelly and ended up going to the hospital and getting his ass shot up with Valium.

Desperate to complete the film, Adlum contacted Roberta, who was, by her account, estranged from Michael at that point. She obliged Adlum's request to work on the film as cinematographer because the project had already been written, funded, and its actors cast.

=== Filming ===
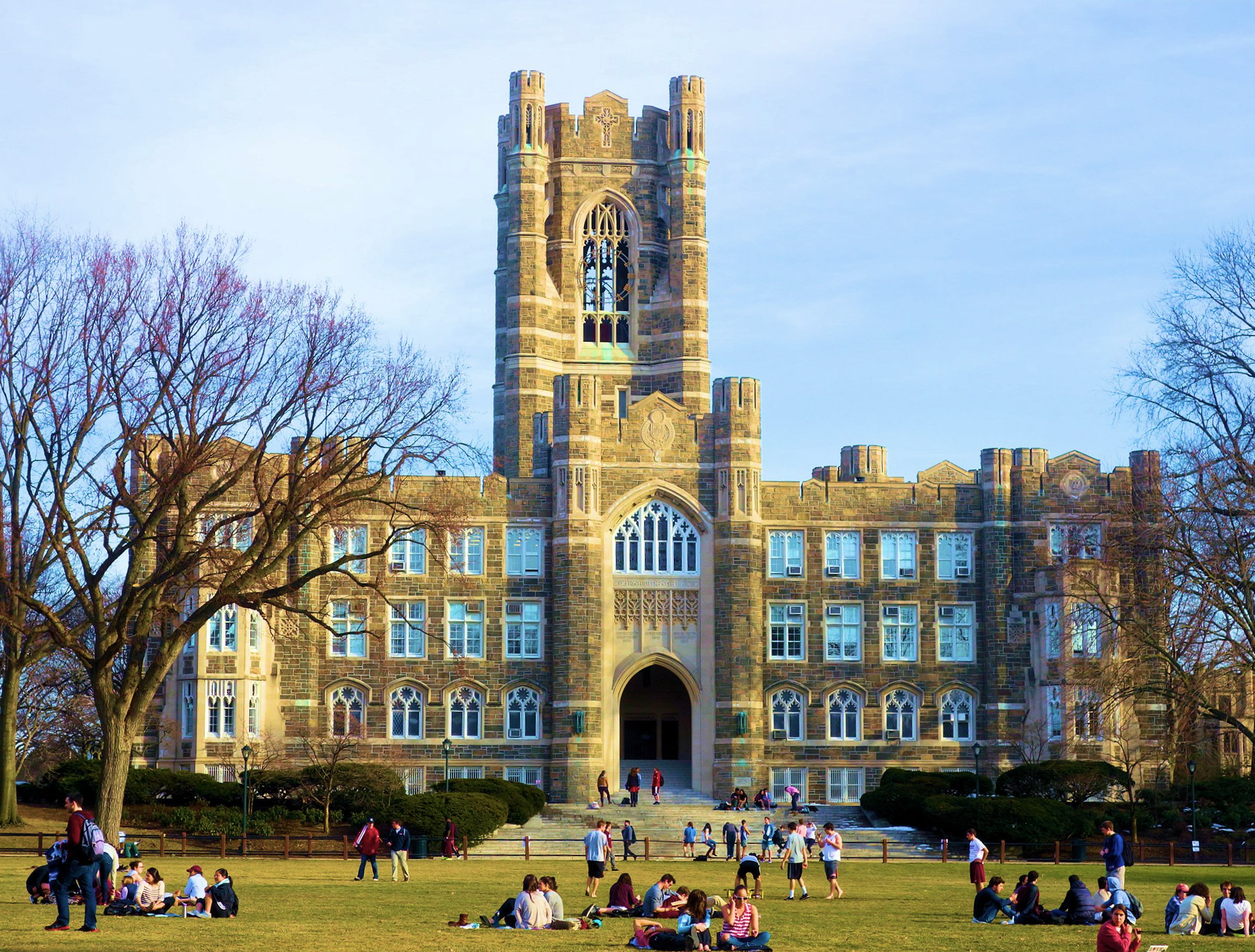
Keating Hall at Fordham University appears in the film's opening sequence

Filming took place primarily in Westchester County, New York, in Croton-on-Hudson and Yorktown. Some filming also took place in New York City: The film's opening campus sequences were shot on location at Fordham University in the Bronx; the campus's Keating Hall and Edwards Parade appear in the opening sequence of the film. The party sequence that appears early in the film was shot at an apartment in the city.

== Release ==
After being rejected by American International Pictures, the film was acquired by American Films Ltd. It was given a limited theatrical release in the United States by American Films Ltd., opening at drive-in theaters in Brownsville, Texas on July 18, 1974, and in Florida on July 19, 1974. It opened at drive-ins in Fresno, Bakersfield, and Inyo, California on December 4, 1974 on a double bill with Moonchild (1974). The film continued to screen in various U.S. cities throughout 1976 and 1977.

The film continued to become a staple of late-night television in the years following its theatrical release.

=== Critical response ===
TV Guide called the film "one of the all-time worst, but the unintentional laughs may make it worth a look for those who can stomach inept filmmaking." On his website Fantastic Movie Musings and Ramblings, Dave Sindelar wrote, "Though it doesn’t quite reach the insane levels of Invasion of the Blood Farmers, it still earns its place in the annals of bad moviedom, and gets weirder as it goes along." James Jay Edwards from FilmFracture gave the film a positive review, writing, "Like most of the quickly produced true-life creature movies of the seventies, Shriek Of The Mutilated is very low-budget and looks every penny of it. Still, it’s not without its charms, and for those who love a good laugh to go along with their shock, it’s essential viewing."

Graeme Clark from The Spinning Image gave the film 3/10 stars, stating that the film was "good for trash fans with a sense of humour, but a no-go area for those with a low tolerance for shoddiness". The Terror Trap awarded the film 1.5 out of 4 stars, writing, "While it's true that some low budget drive in horrors are capable of generating some uniquely creepy vibes, unfortunately Shriek is an ineffectual cough that never rises to the occasion".

=== Home media ===
Iver Film Services (IFS) released the film on VHS in the United Kingdom in 1982. Lightning Video released a VHS in the United States in 1985. The film was released on DVD by Retromedia Entertainment in 2003. Their DVD release did not feature the "Popcorn" instrumental song that appears early in the film, due to concerns over likely copyright issues.

Vinegar Syndrome released the film on Blu-ray on August 30, 2022, featuring several crew interviews, as well as an audio commentary with cinematographer Roberta Findlay. This release restored the recording of "Popcorn" to the film.

== Legacy ==
In 1977, Michael Findlay was killed in a helicopter accident. After her husband's death, Roberta went on to direct hardcore porn, and also kept adding to her horror filmography. Recently, some of their films have gained a cult following.

Writing of Shriek of the Mutilated in his book The Gorehound's Guide to Splatter Films of the 1960s and 1970s, Scott Aaron Stine lauded the film as "an innovative, well paced, and fun little shocker that belies the "talent" behind it."

"I'm on my third viewing of most of the worst movies you've ever seen," Alice Cooper remarked in 1989. "Like Shriek of the Mutilated."

== See also ==
- List of American films of 1974

== Sources ==
- Albright, Brian (2012). Regional Horror Films, 1958-1990: A State-by-State Guide with Interviews. Jefferson, North Carolina: McFarland. ISBN 978-1-476-60042-0.
- Stine, Scott Aaron (2015). The Gorehound's Guide to Splatter Films of the 1960s and 1970s. Jefferson, North Carolina: McFarland. ISBN 978-0-786-49140-7.
