= Class of Nuke 'Em High 2: Subhumanoid Meltdown =

The Class of Nuke 'Em High Part 2: Subhumanoid Meltdown
- Theatrical release poster
- Directed by: Eric Louzil; Donald G. Jackson
- Screenplay by: Lloyd Kaufman; Eric Louzil; Carl Morano; Marcus Roling; Jeffrey W. Sass; Matt Unger
- Story by: Lloyd Kaufman; Carl Morano; Matt Unger
- Produced by: Michael Herz; Lloyd Kaufman
- Starring: Brick Bronsky; Lisa Gaye; Leesa Rowland; Phil Rivo; Mark Richardson
- Cinematography: Ron Chapman
- Edited by: Gordon Grinberg
- Music by: Bob Mithoff
- Production company: Troma Entertainment
- Distributed by: Troma Entertainment
- Release date: April 12, 1991
- Running time: 95 minutes
- Country: United States
- Language: English

Class of Nuke 'Em High Part 2: Subhumanoid Meltdown is a 1991 American science-fiction action horror comedy film, and the first sequel to the 1986 film Class of Nuke 'Em High. There are no characters carried over from the first film, possibly because of the sequel's production being in Yuma, Arizona as opposed to the original's New York-based production.

== Plot ==
Tromaville's nuclear reactor has been rebuilt and the Nukamama Corporation that funded it has incorporated a new college, the Tromaville Institute of Technology (T.I.T.), inside the design, as an effort to atone for the events of the first film.

Located inside the nuclear plant, Professor Holt has perfected a race of 'Sub-humanoids'. They are living beings without emotions, who have been created and programmed to perform menial tasks. When school reporter Roger Smith meets a beautiful subhumanoid named Victoria, they fall in love.

However, the creatures have a tendency to go into spontaneous meltdown. Roger is now determined to save Victoria from this messy fate, but first he will have to face the giant mutant squirrel, Tromie, who attacks Tromaville tech in the climax.

== Cast ==
- Brick Bronsky as Roger Smith
- Lisa Gaye as Professor Melvina Holt
  - Lily Hayes-Kaufman as young Melvina Holt
- Leesa Rowland as Victoria
- Michael Kurtz as Yoke
- Scott Resnick as Dean Okra
- Jacquelyn Rene Moen as Diane / Bald Subhumanoid
- M. Davis as Murray
- Phil Rivo as Harvey / Malathion Man
- Mark Richardson as Motorcycle Man / 674IF
- Erica Frank as Tour guide
- Thomas Perry as The Toxic Avenger
- Michael Herz and Lloyd Kaufman (uncredited) as Voices of Helicopter pilots

== Reception ==
TV Guide liked the film, finding it a good example of the Troma Studios style of filmmaking. It enjoyed the social commentary and noted it had some decent effects. It also noted that the success of the jokes in the film was frenetic.

== Sequels ==
A third film, entitled The Good, the Bad and the Subhumanoid, was released in 1994. A fourth installment, Return to Nuke 'Em High: Volume 1, was released in 2013.
