= Val Avery =

American actor (1924–2009)

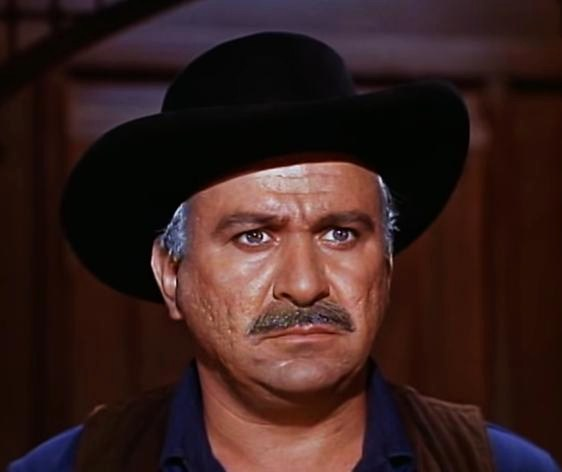
- Avery in an episode of Bonanza (1960).
- Born: Sebouh Der Abrahamian; July 14, 1924; Philadelphia, Pennsylvania, U.S.
- Died: December 12, 2009 (aged 85); New York City, New York, U.S.
- Education: Bessie V. Hicks School of Drama
- Occupation: Actor
- Years active: 1953–2004
- Spouse: Margot Stevenson (m. 1953)
- Children: 1
- Military career
- Allegiance: United States
- Branch: United States Army; Army Air Forces
- Conflicts: World War II

Sebouh Der Abrahamian (July 14, 1924 – December 12, 2009), known professionally as Val Avery, was an American character actor. In a career that spanned 50 years, he appeared in over 100 films and had appearances in over 300 television episodes. He was known as a frequent collaborator of John Cassavetes.

== Early life and education ==
Avery was born in Philadelphia to Armenian parents Megerdich and Arousiag Der Abrahamian. His father was from Sebastia and moved to the United States in 1907. His paternal grandfather, Bedros Der Abrahamian, a priest at the Church of the Holy Mother of God in Sebastia, was killed during the Armenian genocide.

In his early years, Avery acted in plays with the Armenian Youth Federation. After serving in the United States Army Air Forces as a flight instructor during World War II, he attended the Bessie V. Hicks School of Drama in Philadelphia.

== Career ==
Avery was frequently cast as tough or low-class types, such as policemen, thugs, mobsters, bartenders, and blue-collar workers.

He had television roles in The Twilight Zone episode "The Night of the Meek" (1960), and in four Columbo episodes: "A Friend in Deed" (1974), "Dead Weight" (1971), "The Most Crucial Game" (1972), and "Identity Crisis" (1975). Avery's other television appearances include The Untouchables; The Fugitive; Gunsmoke (“The Lure”, 1967); The Asphalt Jungle; The Investigators; Mission: Impossible; Daniel Boone; The Munsters; Mannix; The Odd Couple; Kojak; Quincy, M.E.; Friday the 13th: The Series; Cannon and Law & Order.

Avery made his film debut with an uncredited role in The Harder They Fall (1956), the last film of Humphrey Bogart. Avery appeared in five John Cassavetes films: Too Late Blues (1961), Faces (1968), Minnie and Moskowitz (1971), The Killing of a Chinese Bookie (1976), and Gloria (1980). His many film credits also include The Long, Hot Summer (1958), The Magnificent Seven (1960), Requiem for a Heavyweight (1962), Hud (1963), Papillon (1973), The Wanderers (1979), The Pope of Greenwich Village (1984), Cobra (1986), and Donnie Brasco (1997).

On Broadway, Avery appeared in a successful 1969–70 revival of The Front Page.

== Personal life ==
Avery and actress Margot Stevenson were married from 1953 until his death. Their daughter, Margot Avery, is also an actress.

=== Death ===
Avery died on December 12, 2009, at age 85 in his home in the Greenwich Village section of New York City.

== Filmography ==
=== Film ===
Year	Title	Role	Notes
1956	The Harder They Fall	Frank	Uncredited
1957	Edge of the City	Brother	
1958	The Long, Hot Summer	Wilk	Uncredited
1958	King Creole	Ralph	Uncredited
1959	Last Train from Gun Hill	Steve	
1960	The Magnificent Seven	Henry	
1961	Too Late Blues	Milt Frielobe	
1962	Requiem for a Heavyweight	Promoter	
1963	Hud	Jose	
1963	Love with the Proper Stranger	Stein	Uncredited
1965	Sylvia	Pudgey Smith	Uncredited
1965	The Hallelujah Trail	Denver Bartender	
1965	Satan's Bed	Unknown	
1966	Wild Wild Winter	Fox	
1966	Nevada Smith	Buck Mason	
1966	Assault on a Queen	Trench	
1967	Hombre	Delgado	
1968	Faces	Jim McCarthy	
1968	No Way to Treat a Lady	The Bartender	Uncredited
1968	The Pink Jungle	Rodriguez	
1968	The Brotherhood	Jake Rotherman	
1969	Machine Gun McCain	Chuck Regan	
1969	A Dream of Kings	Fatsas	
1970	The Traveling Executioner	Jake	
1971	Vanishing Point	Police Officer	Uncredited
1971	The Anderson Tapes	Rocco "Socks" Parelli	
1971	Who Says I Can't Ride a Rainbow!	The Marshal	
1971	Minnie and Moskowitz	Zelmo Swift	
1972	The Legend of Hillbilly John	Shull Cobart	
1973	Black Caesar	Cardoza	
1973	Papillon	Pascal	
1973	The Laughing Policeman	Inspector John Pappas	
1975	Russian Roulette	Rudolph Henke	
1975	Let's Do It Again	Lieutenant Bottomley	
1975	Lucky Lady	Dolph	
1976	The Killing of a Chinese Bookie	Blair Benoit	
1976	Harry and Walter Go to New York	Chatsworth	
1977	Heroes	Bus Driver	
1978	Up in Smoke	Factory Boss	
1979	Love and Bullets	Caruso	
1979	The Wanderers	Mr. Sharp	
1979	The Amityville Horror	Sergeant Gionfriddo	
1980	Brubaker	Wendel	
1980	Gloria	Sill	
1981	The Chosen	Teacher	
1981	Continental Divide	Alderman Yablonowitz	
1981	Choices	Coach Rizzo	
1981	Sharky's Machine	Manny	
1982	Assignment Berlin	Talaat Pasha	
1982	Jinxed!	Milt Hawkins	
1983	The Sting II	O'Malley	
1983	Easy Money	Louie	
1984	The Pope of Greenwich Village	Nunzi	
1985	Too Scared to Scream	Dr. Richards	
1986	Cobra	Chief Halliwell	
1986	The Messenger	Clark	
1997	Donnie Brasco	Santo Trafficante Jr.	
1999	A Fish in the Bathtub	Abe	
2001	In the Shadows	Carlo Pierazzi	
2004	Blueberry	Judge	

=== Television ===
Year	Title	Role	Notes
1953	Lux Video Theatre	Hank	Episode: "One for the Road"
1954–56	The Big Story	Informer	2 episodes
1955	Robert Montgomery Presents	Philip Reilly	Episode: "The Tall Dark Man"
1956–58	Kraft Television Theatre	John Hardy / Mauck	2 episodes
1956–58	Playhouse 90	The Bartender	2 episodes
1956–61	Armstrong Circle Theatre	Various roles	9 episodes
1957	Dick Powell's Zane Grey Theatre	Carson	Episode: "Proud Woman"
1957–69	Gunsmoke	Various roles	4 episodes
1958	The Investigator		2 episodes
1959	The Lineup		Episode: "The Frederick Freemont Case"
1959	Border Patrol	"Waxey" Walters	Episode: "In a Deadly Fashion"
1959	Peter Gunn	Hoodlum	Episode: "Protection"
1959	Mickey Spillane's Mike Hammer	Sheriff Jenkins	Episode: "Goodbye, Al"
1959	Johnny Staccato	Corky Lewis	Episode: "Viva, Paco!"
1959	The Lawless Years	"Bobo" Koening	Episode: "The Billy Boy 'Rockabye' Creel Story"
1959	The Play of the Week	Police Chief	Episode: "The Power and the Glory"
1960	The Untouchables	Frank Salinas, Johnny	2 episodes
1960	Bonanza	Sheriff Trev Kincaid	Episode: "Breed of Violence"
1960	Hong Kong	Michael Fortune	Episode: "The Turncoat"
1960	The Twilight Zone	The Bartender	Episode: "The Night of the Meek"
1961	Tales of Wells Fargo	Frank "Bully" Armstrong	Episode: "Town Against a Man"
1961	Have Gun – Will Travel	B.J. Throckton	Episode: "The Gold Bar"
1961	Rawhide	Sheriff	S3:E28, "Incident of the Blackstorms"
1961	The Asphalt Jungle	The Big Fellow	Episode: "The Dark Night"
1961	The Investigators	Phil Bledsoe	Episode: "Something for Charity"
1961–63	The Defenders	Various roles	3 episodes
1962	The Everglades	Pops, Harry Conlin	2 episodes
1963	Naked City	Franko	Episode: "Beyond This Place There Be Dragons"
1963	The Doctors and the Nurses	Charman Tompkins	Episode: "Strike"
1963–64	East Side/West Side	Lieutenant Al Costello	5 episodes
1964	The Reporter	Pete Krenek	Episode: "How Much for a Prince?"
1964	Mr. Broadway	Detective	Episode: "Smelling Like a Rose"
1964–65	The Munsters	The Commissar, Marty	2 episodes
1965	Kraft Suspense Theatre	Various roles	3 episodes
1965	Slattery's People	Lou Teller	Episode: "Question: Does Nero Still at Ringside Sit?"
1965	Peyton Place	Boudreau	Episode: #1.81
1965	Daniel Boone	Watowah	Episode: "The Old Man and the Cave"
1965	Get Smart	KAOS Agent #1	Episode: "Now You See Him, Now You Don't"
1965	Honey West	Roger	Episode: "A Neat Little Package"
1965–67	The Fugitive	Various roles	4 episodes
1966	The Virginian	Jim Sunderland	Episode: "Harvest of Strangers"
1966	Run for Your Life	2nd Man	Episode: "Night Train from Chicago"
1966	Felony Squad	Gene Hardy	Episode: "Strike Out"
1966	I Spy	Josef	Episode: "Will the Real Good Guys Please Stand Up?"
1966	Laredo	Sheriff Jonathan Daniels	Episode: "Road to San Remo"
1966–67	The Wild Wild West	Brad Logan, John Crane	2 episodes
1966–74	The F.B.I.	Various roles	4 episodes
1967	Dragnet 1967	Phil Masturian	Episode: "The Big Explosion"
1967	The Invaders	Manager	Episode: "The Mutation"
1967	Iron Horse	Grimes	Episode: "The Passenger"
1967	Mr. Terrific	Leo	Episode: "Stanley the Track Star"
1967	CBS Playhouse	McDermott	Episode: "Do Not Go Gentle Into That Good Night"
1968	Lancer	Wade Hackett	Episode: "Julie"
1968	Judd, for the Defense	John Rowan	Episode: "A Swim with Sharks"
1968	N.Y.P.D.	Walter Carney	Episode: "The Love Hustle"
1968–71	The Mod Squad	Briggs, "Turk"	2 episodes
1968–72	Mission: Impossible	Various roles	4 episodes
1969	My Friend Tony		Episode: "Let George Do It"
1970	Dan August	Russ Carter	Episode: "The Murder of a Small Town"
1970	The Name of the Game	Mike	Episode: "Cynthia Is Alive and Living in Avalon"
1970	The Bold Ones: The Lawyers	Lieutenant Aram Makarian	Episode: "Panther in a Cage"
1970–74	Mannix	Various roles	4 episodes
1971	Monty Nash	Luis Perez / Man	2 episodes
1971	The Bold Ones: The New Doctors	Victor Corso	Episode: "The Convicts"
1971–72	McCloud	Walter McKay, Gruber	2 episodes
1971–75	Columbo	Various roles	4 episodes
1972	Nichols	Jasper	2 episodes
1972–73	Ironside	McKay, Arnie Hummel	2 episodes
1972–74	Cannon	Leo Crothers, Pawnshop Owner	2 episodes
1973	Madigan	Augie	Episode: "The Park Avenue Beat"
1973	Shaft	Captain Rigano	Episode: "The Killing"
1973	The Odd Couple	Elmo	Episode: "A Barnacle Adventure"
1973–74	Barnaby Jones	Andy Burns	4 episodes
1973–74	Police Story	Sergeant Mahler, Steve	2 episodes
1974	Kojak	George Janis	Episode: "Marker to a Dead Bookie"
1975	Archer	Joe Mengers	Episode: "Blood Money"
1975	McCoy	"Turk"	Episode: "Double Take"
1976–77	Baretta	Ray Carmona, Pogo	2 episodes
1976–78	Switch	Rosie Finniston, Irving Munn	2 episodes
1977	Starsky & Hutch	Captain Ryan	Episode: "Starsky and Hutch Are Guilty"
1977	The Hardy Boys/Nancy Drew Mysteries	Tracy, Skipper	2 episodes
1977	Man from Atlantis	Lew	Episode: "C.W. Hyde"
1977–81	Quincy, M.E.	Various roles	4 episodes
1981	The Misadventures of Sheriff Lobo	Bearded Man In Suit	Episode: "What're Girls Like You Doing in a Bank Like This?"
1984	Hardcastle and McCormick	Willie Lerner	Episode: "It Coulda Been Worse, She Coulda Been a Welder"
1987	Cagney & Lacey	Rekubian	Episode: "Favors"
1988	Friday the 13th: The Series	Russ Sharko	Episode: "Badge of Honor"
1989	Men	Burt	Episode: "Cupid Ms...Takes"
1989	Moonlighting	Mr. Viola	Episode: "In 'N Outlaws"
1989	Hunter	Ray Sullivan	Episode: "Ring of Honor"
1991–96	Law & Order	Max Schaeffer, Dan Magadan Sr.	2 episodes
1992	Counterstrike	Morey Lempke	Episode: "No Honour Among Thieves"
1992	Secret Service	Moe	Episode: "It's in the Mail/Counterfeit Murder"
1992	Civil Wars	Sol Lobell	Episode: "The Old Man and the 'C'"
2001	100 Centre Street	Sal Gentle	Episode: "Queenie and Joe"

==== Television films, miniseries, and specials ====
Year	Title	Role	Notes
1957	There Shall Be No Night	Gus Shuman	
1960	Cradle Song	The Driver	
1961	The Power and the Glory		
1966	The Dangerous Days of Kiowa Jones	Morgan	
1971	A Tattered Web	Sergeant Harry Barnes	
1973	Firehouse	Sonny Caputo	
1973	Blood Sport	Frank Dorsdale	
1975	The Law	Ouspensky	
1977	Stonestreet: Who Killed the Centerfold Model?	Chuck Voit	
1984	The Streets	Whitcomb	
1985	Out of the Darkness	Guido Pressano	
1986	Courage	Pete Solto	
1992	Teamster Boss: The Jackie Presser Story	Salerno	
1994	Assault at West Point: The Court-Martial of Johnson Whittaker	General William T. Sherman	
1997	Gold Coast	Jimmy Capp	
