= Class of Nuke 'Em High 3: The Good, the Bad and the Subhumanoid =

- Theatrical release poster
- Directed by: Eric Louzil
- Screenplay by: Stephen Gerard; Lloyd Kaufman; Eric Louzil; Carl Morano; Marcus Roling; Jeffrey W. Sass; Matt Unger
- Story by: Lloyd Kaufman; Carl Morano; Matt Unger
- Produced by: Michael Herz; Lloyd Kaufman
- Starring: Brick Bronsky; Lisa Gaye; Lisa Star; John Tallman; Albert Bear; Phil Rivo
- Narrated by: Brick Bronsky
- Cinematography: Ron Chapman
- Edited by: Karen Pell; Ian Slater
- Production company: Troma Entertainment
- Distributed by: Troma Entertainment
- Release date: October 20, 1994
- Running time: 102 minutes
- Country: United States
- Language: English

Class of Nuke 'Em High Part 3: The Good, the Bad and the Subhumanoid (credited onscreen as The Good, the Bad and the Subhumanoid: Class of Nuke 'Em High Part 3) is a 1994 American science-fiction horror comedy film directed by Eric Louzil and distributed by Troma Entertainment. It is the third installment of the Class of Nuke 'Em High film series.

== Plot ==
Moments after the end of the second film, the mutant squirrel Tromie is subdued and life in Tromaville returns to normal. Roger Smith, now mayor of Tromaville, is overjoyed at the birth of his twin sons, Dick and Adlai. Unfortunately for all concerned parties, Dick is kidnapped at the hospital and subsequently raised to be evil by the thugs who took him. Adlai, meanwhile, is raised by Roger to be kind and peaceful.

Flashing-forward several years into the future, when Dick and Adlai are adults, trouble comes in the form of the loathsome Dr. Slag, Ph.D., who uses Dick to frame Adlai for a crime he did not commit in the hopes of turning the denizens of Tromaville against him. If his wily plot works, Slag will turn the town into a toxic wasteland; with destruction looming, it is up to Adlai to save the day.

The plot is loosely based on William Shakespeare's The Comedy of Errors. The only thing carried over is the storyline of the twins being separated and a later identity crisis following. Not much else remains the same.

== Cast ==
- Brick Bronsky as Mayor Roger Smith / Adlai Smith / Dick Smith / Baby Moishe Smith
  - Eric Robert Louzil as young Adlai Smith / young Dick Smith
- Lisa Star as Trish
- John Tallman as Dr. Slag, Ph.D.
- Lisa Gaye as Professor Melvina Holt
- Albert Bear as Li'l Eggwhite
- Phil Rivo as Werewolf Clone / Mad Scientist / Phil Man
- Elizabeth Young as Eliana
- Valerie McConnell as Lisa
- Kathleen Kane as Angel Finkelstein
- Lizette Faz as Souzie Schwartz
- Ron Hyatt as Professor Chernobyl
- Lloyd Kaufman as Voice of helicopter pilot

== Production ==
=== Casting ===
Class of Nuke 'Em High 2 did not use cast from Class of Nuke 'Em High. Class of Nuke 'Em High 3 carried over the cast and characters of Class of Nuke 'Em High 2.

Wrestler-turned-actor Brick Bronsky started his career with Troma in early 1990 during the filming of the superhero film Sgt. Kabukiman N.Y.P.D. (1991) as the henchman 'Jughead'. Kaufman and Herz enjoyed working with Bronsky so much that they offered him a lead in Class of Nuke 'Em High 2 which was filmed in 1991.

Thinking that Bronsky had good star power, he was brought back for the third film in three different roles (in the trailer, he is credited for four roles) to showcase his acting career in hopes of getting him noticed by more people as the talented actor they thought he was.

During the marketing, Troma advertised him as their own action star, giving him a parade in Cannes and talking about him as if he was just as big as any other action star out there. Despite the advertising to help the film and Bronsky's career, the film did not get noted much out of Troma's fanbase and Bronsky only appeared in a handful of films following the third Nuke 'Em High, often in the henchman role.

=== Filming ===
Like its immediate predecessor, it was filmed in Los Angeles, California, and not New York City, New York — as in the original, and most in-house Troma Entertainment productions.

== Release ==
After having trouble releasing its films with other distributors (Warner Home Video, Fox, Lorimar, etc.), Troma created its own distribution company in 1995 under the label Troma Team Video and Class of Nuke 'Em High 3 was advertised as the company's first major release on VHS. Held back for a year and only released on video, Class of Nuke 'Em High 3 became legendary not for its content, but for what it represented — that the company had taken a huge step forward in labeling and marketing its own films.

After a couple of years as one of its biggest sellers, Class of Nuke 'Em High 3 went out of print, and with the decline of video, Troma decided not to re-release it because — despite being highly popular with fans — it felt that the film itself was inferior to some of its other titles.

=== Home media ===
In the mid-2000s, Troma released a Class of Nuke 'Em High box set, which featured the original 1986 film in the same DVD format it had had since 1997 and Class of Nuke 'Em High 2 which had just recently been released on its own. For years, the box set was the only way of being able to buy the third film on DVD. However, in early 2010, alongside a re-release of the 1986 film by the Troma Retro label, the third film was released separately.

== Reception ==
Horror News said, "If you’re a Troma fan, go ahead as this is typical Troma fare that is sure to satiate your inane need for, er, inanity. If you like your Starbucks, wear suspenders, glasses when you don’t need to and think it’s cool to wear a scarf in summer, give this a miss." TV Guide said, "the editing is nonexistent, and the story line is almost impossible to follow. The slipshod nature of CLASS OF NUKE 'EM HIGH 3 can partly be explained by Troma's frugal use of leftover scenes from previous films."
