= Cowards (1970 film) =

Cowards (Love-In '72)
- DVD cover of the recut version of Cowards, under the title Love-In '72
- Directed by: Simon Nuchtern
- Starring: John Ross; Susan Sparling; Will Patent; Philip Baker Hall
- Production companies: Jaylo International Films, Inc.
- Release date: 1970
- Running time: 89 minutes
- Country: United States
- Language: English

Cowards is a 1970 American drama film written and directed by Simon Nuchtern about the then-topical issue of draft evasion in the Vietnam War. It was screened at the Cannes Film Festival in 1970.

Following the commercial failure of Cowards, the film was re-edited with newly shot erotic scenes featuring unrelated actors, and was reissued under the title Love-In '72 so that it could be remarketed as a sexploitation film. Nuchtern's name was removed from the credits of the recut version; the direction of Love-In '72 was credited to Sidney Knight and Karl Hansen, and the writing to Jay Robins.

== Plot ==
A young man must decide whether to flee the U.S. draft and move to Canada, or stay to go fight for his country in Vietnam.

== Cast ==
- John Ross as Phillip Haller
- Susan Sparling as Joan Boyd
- Will Patent as Peter Yates
- Tom Murphy as Howard Yates
- Philip Baker Hall as Father Reis
- Alexander Gellman as Gregory Haller
- Spalding Gray as Radical at party

Additional cast in Love-In '72 version:

- Linda Southern as Sunny
- Daniel Nugent as Steve
- Sandra Peabody as Linda
- Lucy Grantham as Susan

== Reception ==
Reviews of Cowards were mixed to negative. Roger Greenspun of The New York Times said he "liked" Cowards despite it being "one of the squarest, most unashamedly flat‐footed films of the year," and praised the performances of John Ross and Susan Sparling. The New York Daily News said that "at best, the drama is talky and labored." TV Guide dismissed it as "inept" and "a film best forgotten."

Reviewing the DVD release of the Love-In '72 cut for Something Weird Video, Frank Henenlotter wrote "Eagle-eyed viewers will enjoy spotting two now-mainstream actors in small, incendiary roles: Philip Baker Hall plays the priest who preaches the gospel of civil disobedience, while monologuist Spalding Grey is alternately funny and scary as a psycho terrorist babbling at a party."
