= Rejuvenatrix =

- The Rejuvenator movie poster
- Directed by: Brian Thomas Jones
- Written by: Brian Thomas Jones (story); Simon Nuchtern (screenplay and story)
- Produced by: Steven D. Mackler (producer); Bernard E. Goldberg (executive producer); Robert Zimmerman (line producer); William Paul (associate producer)
- Starring: Vivian Lanko; John MacKay
- Edited by: Brian O'Hara
- Music by: Larry Juris
- Production company: Jewel Productions
- Distributed by: Sony Video Software Company
- Release date: 1988
- Running time: 90 minutes
- Country: United States
- Language: English
- Budget: $230,000

Rejuvenatrix (also known as The Rejuvenator) is a 1988 American horror film starring Vivian Lanko and John MacKay, and directed by Brian Thomas Jones. The film was partly inspired by the 1959 science fiction film The Wasp Woman, which had been produced and directed by Roger Corman. The original title was Rejuvenatrix, although it has become more popularly known as The Rejuvenator, and this included the UK and Brazil.

== Plot ==
A rich actress, Ruth Warren, who has gotten too old for leading roles, hopes to restore her youthful beauty. For a few years she had been financing a scientist, Dr. Gregory Ashton, who is working on a formula for eternal youth. This formula involves withdrawing certain fluids from the human brain. Although Ashton had found a serum that reverses the aging process, it was not yet complete. However Warren threatens to cut funding if Ashton will not give her the serum. Despite the warnings of danger, she willingly volunteers to become a human laboratory rat and takes the serum. The operation is successful and the rejuvenated woman regains her beauty, dubbing herself Elizabeth. However she does not realize that Ashton had to use the brains of dead bodies to get the chemical needed for the formula, which she must continue being injected with, and this leaves a limited supply shortly after. The experiment has unforeseen side effects, and turns Warren into a monster, who resorts to murder in her lust for human brains.

== Cast ==
- Vivian Lanko as Elizabeth Warren/The Monster
- John MacKay as Dr. Gregory Ashton
- James Hogue as Wilhelm
- Katell Pleven as Dr. Stella Stone
- Jessica Dublin as Ruth Warren
- Marcus Powell as Dr. Germaine
- Roy MacArthur as Hunter
- Louis F. Homyak as Tony the Guard
- Irene Fitzpatrick as Nurse Jones

== Production ==
The film originally came about through director Brian Thomas Jones and Steven Mackler, who would produce the film. Mackler contacted Jones after he was impressed with his 1984 short-film Overexposed, a film about photojournalists on assignment in El Salvador. Mackler made a deal with Sony Video Software - SVS Films - in 1987, which involved the creation of three feature films. He soon contacted Jones so that they could collaborate on a film together. Mackler sent him a script titled Skin, which was written by Simon Nuchtern, specifically as a vehicle for special effects make-up artist Ed French. In an interview with Matty Budrewicz for UK Horror Scene, Jones said: "I read the script and, when I finished, I said to myself "I can't direct this script, but I know how to make this movie. It's Bride of Frankenstein meets Sunset Boulevard! I pitched the concept to Mackler and he let me rewrite it". Although much of the structure was kept the same, including the special effects, Jones rewrote the script to include his own ideas. He was not a fan of gore, so he wrote in themes of vanity, addiction, obsession and greed for "something really heartfelt and dramatic."

The filming of Rejuventrix took twenty-two days to shoot, two-days longer than scheduled. The project's expense came to approximately $230,000 after post production. The main filming location was in New York City, United States. The mansion within the film was located in New Jersey, with the film crew shooting the first four days of the project there. Ashton's lab had been discovered by Jones when he was at the production offices and noticed two polaroids on production manager Bob Zimmerman's desk. These were of an abandoned tuberculosis hospital on State Island. The lab was later used in the 1990 film Jacob's Ladder. Within the film, American all-female heavy metal group Poison Dollys made an appearance performing live at a nightclub. The group performed two songs; "Turn Out the Lights" and "Nice Boy" - both of these tracks exclusive to the film. Speaking of Vivian Lanko, Jones recalled she was "committed" and "endured hours of effects application and removal". He added: "She was fascinated by the character and the transformation. Her chemistry with John McKay was just great. He and Vivian were two of the best things that happened with the movie and I think the movie works as well as it does because of them".

Upon its release, Jones and Mackler had planned to use initial positive reviews to re-market the film as a "modern midnight movie". However SVS were less optimistic about the film and decided to book only a limited theatrical run of one week in New York. Jones believed the film had "cult potential but never got the opportunity". SVS also interfered with the film's title, of which there were several working titles, including "Scream Queen". A friend of Jones, Mark Carducci, came up with the title "Rejuvenatrix", which SVS went with, however Jones felt the title should have been "Psychotronic". Rejuvenatrix debuted within America during July 1988. Later on October 31 it had its video premiere, released by Sony/Columbia-Tristar under the title The Rejuvenator. In West Germany it had a video premiere in May 1989, and in 1991 it was released in Portugal. In the UK the film was given a VHS release via Castle Home Video. The Brazilian VHS release was issued by Taipan Vídeo. In 2013, CMV Laservision issued the film on DVD in Germany - the first DVD release of Rejuvenatrix.

In the early 2014 interview for UK Horror Scene, Budrewicz described the film as "a marvellous, Gothic sci-fi frightener - a kooky and ever-so-slightly-kinky hybrid of Cronenberg, The Wasp Woman and Billy Wilder's noir classic Sunset Boulevard". Jones was disappointed that it never got the recognition he felt it deserved, but noted it still had a fanbase. He said "I probably should let it go but I'll always hold a grudge for that SVS guy who didn't understand the genre or its fandom and realise the potential of what he had".

The film was Vivian Lanko's debut appearance. Married to actor Martin Donovan, she would only appear in two other films The Refrigerator (1991) and Simple Men (1992).

== Reception ==
Variety magazine noted the film's "Elaborate make-up effects", while also stating that the film was "Designed to appeal to connoisseurs of contemporary horror". Dan Pavlides from Allmovie gave the film two and a half stars out of five, commending the film's special effects. Ryne Barber from Horror News.net gave the film a negative review, writing: "In all, The Rejuvenator is a mad scientist film that hits all of the tropes but does them all rather uninterestingly. The plot is too repetitive and obvious, and the film never falls into the category of B-movies where it's so laughable that it becomes fun to watch. Instead, it's a film that won’t find much of an audience anywhere, except maybe with those people who remember it nostalgically. But for those who haven't seen it, The Rejuvenator doesn’t deserve to be revived". Jones later recalled some of the critical reception of the film at the time of its release, in relation to his attempt add a more heartfelt and dramatic side to the film: "The reviews of it in NY Daily News, Fangoria, Variety and Cinefantastique all mentioned the characters and story, saying that it really set it apart from the crowd of low budget horror films. One of the nicest compliments I got was from a professor of mine in grad school, who taught critical theory for art. He watched the film and said that I elevated the movie above the genre with a genuine affection for the characters".
