= Snuff (film) =

1976 splatter film

- Original theatrical release poster
- Directed by: Michael Findlay; Horacio Fredriksson; Simon Nuchtern (additional footage)
- Written by: Michael Findlay
- Produced by: Jack Bravman; Allan Shackleton
- Starring: Margarita Amuchástegui; Ana Carro; Liliana Fernández Blanco; Alfredo Iglesias; Enrique Larratelli; Mirta Massa; Aldo Mayo; Clao Villanueva
- Cinematography: Roberta Findlay
- Music by: Rick Howard
- Distributed by: Monarch Releasing Corporation
- Release date: January 16, 1976
- Running time: 80 minutes
- Countries: United States; Argentina
- Language: English
- Budget: $30,000

Snuff is a 1976 splatter film directed by Michael Findlay and Horacio Fredriksson. Originally an exploitation film loosely based on the 1969 murders committed by the Manson Family, it is most notorious for being falsely marketed as if it were an actual snuff film. The controversy about the film was deliberately manufactured to attract publicity: it prompted an investigation by the New York County District Attorney, who determined that the murder shown in the film was fake. This picture contributed to the urban legend of snuff films, although the concept did not originate with it.

== Plot ==
Pregnant actress Terry London (played by Mirta Massa) and her producer, Max Marsh, visit an unnamed country in South America. A female biker cult led by a man named Satán (/səˈtɑːn/) stalks and eventually murders the pregnant London and her circle of friends.

In the film's final minutes, the action is interrupted as the camera pulls back to reveal the crew shooting the scene; the director is then seen flirting with a female crew member. They start kissing while the crew films them. The director suddenly assaults the woman and proceeds to torture, kill, and disembowel her as the crew assists him and keeps filming. The film then ends with the camera running out of stock.

== Cast ==
- Margarita Amuchástegui as Angelica
- Ana Carro as Ana
- Liliana Fernández Blanco as Susanna
- Roberta Findlay as Carmela (voice)
- Alfredo Iglesias as Horst's father
- Enrique Larratelli as Satán
- Mirta Massa as Terry London
- Aldo Mayo as Max Marsh
- Clao Villanueva as Horst Frank
- Michael Findlay as Detective
- Brian Cary as film director (additional footage)
- Tina Austin as script girl (additional footage)

== Production ==
The film started out as a low-budget exploitation film titled Slaughter (Note: Some sources give the film's title as The Slaughter.) made by the husband-and-wife filmmaking team of Michael and Roberta Findlay. Filmed in Argentina in 1971 on a budget of $30,000, it depicted the actions of a Manson-esque murder cult, and was shot mainly without sound due to most of the actors speaking little or no English. The film's financier, Jack Bravman, took an out-of-court settlement from American International Pictures to allow it to use the title Slaughter for its Blaxploitation film starring Jim Brown. Some sources state that the Findlays' film received an extremely limited theatrical release, while others indicate it was never screened theatrically at all under its original title.

In any event, independent low-budget distributor and producer Allan Shackleton, who specialized in sexploitation movies, bought the distribution rights for the film. In 1975, after reading a newspaper article on the rumor of snuff films produced in South America, Shackleton saw an opportunity to cash in on the urban legend by adding a new ending to Slaughter. Shackleton began to advertise the film in December 1975 through press releases. When Michael Findlay realized that it was his own film being promoted under the new title Snuff, he tried to renegotiate the contract with the distributor, but eventually failed to secure more money from Shackleton. The filmmaker hired to shoot the additional footage was Simon Nuchtern, who directed a new ending in vérité style, in which a woman is brutally murdered and dismembered by a film crew, supposedly the crew of Slaughter.

The new footage, shot over one day in Carter Stevens's adult film studio, was spliced onto the end of Slaughter with an abrupt cut suggesting that the footage was unplanned. This subtle yet impactful cut only further reinforced viewers' belief that the murder being depicted was truly "authentic". However, no one seemed to notice that the cast and scenery in Nuchtern's ending bore no resemblance to those in Findlay's original footage. The publicity material implied that the film featured an actual murder without stating it outright: "Snuff" was released with the tagline "The film that could only be made in South America... where Life is CHEAP!" To further increase the air of mystery surrounding the film's production, Shackleton decided to remove all other credits from the film.

== Controversy ==
As a publicity stunt, Shackleton reportedly hired fake protesters to picket movie theaters showing the film. According to his associate Carter Stevens, he was later surprised when genuine protesters also started picketing the theaters. Shackleton's efforts succeeded in generating a media frenzy around the film, with media commentators and citizen groups condemning the film without having actually seen it. Although the film was exposed as a hoax in Variety shortly after its release, it became popular in New York City, Philadelphia, Los Angeles and Boston.

The Adult Film Association of America (AFAA), of which Shackleton was a member, took pains to avoid any association with Snuff, as the snuff movies urban legend included rumors that the sex industry was involved in those films. The AFAA expelled Shackleton, then later announced that affiliated adult movie theaters would not show the picture (which was being shown in mainstream theaters and not in adult ones), and called a press conference to insist that the film was a hoax.

Rumors persisted that the film showed a real-life murder. Throughout Snuff's theatrical run, Shackleton remained purportedly ambiguous about the nature of the film. When interviewed by Variety, he stated: "[If the murder is real], I'd be a fool to admit it. If it isn't real, I'd be a fool to admit it."

Prompted by "complaints and petitions from well-known writers, including Eric Bentley and Susan Brownmiller, and legislators", New York District Attorney Robert M. Morgenthau conducted a month-long investigation into the circumstances surrounding the film's production. Morgenthau ultimately dismissed the supposedly "real" murder as "nothing more than conventional trick photography—as is evident to anyone who sees the movie." Morgenthau reassured the public that the actress apparently being dismembered and killed in the ending of the film had been traced by the police and was "alive and well". He also found no basis for criminal prosecution related to pornography statutes, or to consumer fraud laws in regard to the film's advertising. However, Morgenthau stated that he had been "concerned about the fact that this kind of a film might incite or encourage people to commit violence against women."

== Release ==
=== Theatrical release ===
Upon its release at the National Theatre in New York City with a $4 ticket price, Snuff grossed $66,456 in its first week. In New York, it outgrossed One Flew Over the Cuckoo's Nest for three consecutive weeks.

During its theatrical run, feminist groups kept protesting Snuff, which influenced city officials in Santa Clara, Philadelphia and St Paul to force theaters to stop showing the film. Twenty women protested the film's return engagement in Rochester, New York at the Holiday Ciné: four of those protesters were arrested after breaking the poster frame to destroy the film's poster. A theater owner in Monticello was prosecuted on obscenity charges. In most places, however, the protests failed to stop the theaters from showing the movie.

=== Home media ===
In the United Kingdom, the film was released on VHS by Astra Video in 1982, coinciding with the start of the video nasty controversy. The cover blurb read "The original legendary atrocity shot and banned in New York" and claimed that "The actors and actresses who dedicated their lives to making this film were never seen or heard from again". The cover also credited "T. Amazzo" (a play on the Italian phrase "Ti ammazzo", meaning "I kill you") as director. The Sunday Times published an outraged article about the film, which Astra Video eventually pulled from distribution once it had benefited from the publicity.

The film was released on DVD by Blue Underground on July 29, 2003. Blue Underground later released the film on DVD Special edition and for the first time on Blu-ray on October 22, 2013. It was last released by Cheezy Flicks on March 13, 2018.

== Critical reception ==
Snuff was panned by critics at the time of its original release, both for the disingenuous publicity surrounding it and for its overall quality. Richard Eder of the New York Times described it as "a horrendously written, photographed, acted, directed and dubbed bit of verdigris showing a group of devil-girls massacring people." Also in the New York Times, John Leonard reported that the film's special effects were inferior to those of Marcus Welby, M.D. and that the final "murder" was less "obnoxious" than a similar scene from Flesh for Frankenstein.

Later reviews were equally negative. Joel Harley from HorrorNews.net wrote in his review of the film, "Were it not for that ending and the furore surrounding it, Snuff would surely have been forgotten a long time ago. Beyond the infamy, it's a stultifyingly average film." Bill Gibron from PopMatters gave the film 3/10 stars, writing, "Unlike modern gorefests which strive for autopsy like realism in all facets of the F/X, Snuff is cheap and cheesy. While it[s] legend lives on, its realities end any speculation or scandal for that matter. No one really dies onscreen during the last few minutes of this movie. Your sense of gullibility, on the other hand..." Adam Tyner from DVD Talk called the film "basically unwatchable in its original form". Tyner criticized the film's unnecessarily dragged out scenes, lack of tension, and dubbed dialogue, which he called "sleepy, flat, lifeless, and howlingly inept all around, never even making an attempt to match any frantically flapping lips".
