= The Oracle (1985 film) =

- Directed by: Roberta Findlay
- Screenplay by: R. Allen Leider
- Story by: R. Allen Leider
- Produced by: Walter E. Sear
- Cinematography: Roberta Findlay (uncredited)
- Edited by: Roberta Findlay
- Music by: Michael Litovsky; Walter E. Sear
- Release date: May 1985
- Running time: 94 minutes
- Country: United States
- Language: English

The Oracle is a 1985 American horror film directed by Roberta Findlay.

== Plot ==
An old woman, Mrs. Malatesta, uses an artificial hand with a quill as a planchette to make contact with the afterlife. A young woman, Jennifer, moves into Mrs. Malatesta's apartment as the new tenant alongside her husband Ray. The property manager, Pappas, says that the old woman disappeared without a trace. While browsing through the apartment's belongings, Jennifer comes across a box that contains the hand with the quill. Meanwhile, a corpulent stranger goes with a prostitute to her room and kills her, before being revealed to be a woman named Farkas.

Jennifer and Ray host a Christmas party in which the planchette is tried out as a party gag. The hand with a quill suddenly starts writing the message "Help me". Later that night, Jennifer discovers the planchette writing the name William Graham and a phone number. When she tells her friend Cindy, she calls the number and learns that William Graham was a man who had committed suicide three weeks earlier.

After Jennifer notices again that the hand is writing on its own, she throws it and the box into the wastebasket. Ray, thinking Jennifer is crazy, wants to dispose of the box, but on the way to the garbage chute, he meets Pappas, who takes it away from him. Later, after Pappas asks the planchette about lottery numbers, the box releases a monster that attacks him, and then makes him see imaginary monsters all over his body that he tries to kill with a knife, stabbing himself to death in the process.

Ray discovers that Graham was found suffocated in his car at his warehouse. Jennifer retrieves the planchette and begins using it as a medium, seeing that William Graham did not commit suicide, but was murdered by Farkas and an accomplice. She then goes to see Graham's widow Dorothy, and tells her about her findings. At a New Year's Eve party, Jennifer is attacked by Farkas disguised as a waitress, but is able to knock Farkas down. Using the planchette, she discovers that Farkas is the same person who killed Graham. Cindy, still believing Jennifer is suffering from delusions, brings a psychiatrist, but the psychiatrist is killed by the planchette's dark force. While out for a walk, Farkas attempts to murder Jennifer by running her over, but she manages to escape to a museum and ask a security guard for help. Meanwhile, Ray is killed by the box's force after discovering it hidden in the laundry basket.

Jennifer is picked up in an ambulance and taken to a psychiatric institution. There, Farkas' accomplice, disguised as a doctor, tries to kill Jennifer, but is killed by a creature before doing so. Jennifer is able to escape from the institution and is invited into the car by Dorothy, who seemingly appeared by chance, only to be revealed that Farkas is also in the car; Dorothy was behind her husband's murder. They drive to the warehouse where Graham was killed, where Jennifer is able to escape again, but Farkas chases her with an ax. William Graham's reanimated corpse appears and kills Farkas, allowing Jennifer to escape. Mrs. Graham, upon discovering Farkas' body, barricades herself in her husband's car, only for Graham's zombie to gas her to death in the car.

The final shot shows Jennifer sitting in front of the planchette again, implicitly having taken Mrs. Malatesta's place.

== Cast ==
- Irma St. Paule as Mrs. Malatesta
- Caroline Capers Powers as Jennifer
- Roger Neil as Ray
- Pam La Testa as Farkas
- Victoria Dryden as Dorothy Graham
- Chris Maria De Koron as Pappas
- Dan Lutsky as Tom Varney
- Stacey Graves as Cindy
- G. Gordon Cronce as Ben

== Reception ==
The Miami Herald's Orlando Aloma gave the film 0.5 out of 4 stars, writing that it "has little to say". The Palm Beach Post's Kathryn Buxton gave the film zero stars and criticized the "meandering" plot. The Sun Sentinel's Candice Russell also gave the film zero stars, calling it "a perfectly awful misogynistic film".

German magazine Cinema wrote "Despite a few bumpy cuts, this low-budget production has a few good shock effects, but this only raises the film just above average."
