= Gerald Feil =

American cinematographer

- Born: May 1, 1933; New York, U.S.
- Died: February 9, 2021 (aged 87); Montreal, Quebec, Canada
- Education: Antioch College
- Occupation: Cinematographer
- Spouse: Hila Feil

Gerald Feil (May 1, 1933 – February 9, 2021) was an American cinematographer. He was best known for his cinematography work in the films Friday the 13th Part III, He Knows You're Alone, Silent Madness and Let's Spend the Night Together.

Feil died on February 9, 2021, in Montreal, Quebec, at the age of 87.
