= The Toxic Avenger Part II =

1989 American superhero comedy film by Lloyd Kaufman and Michael Herz

- Theatrical release poster
- Directed by: Lloyd Kaufman; Michael Herz
- Written by: Gay Partington Terry; Lloyd Kaufman
- Based on: Characters by Joe Ritter
- Produced by: Michael Herz; Lloyd Kaufman; Jeffrey W. Sass
- Starring: Ron Fazio; Phoebe Legere; John Altamura; Rick Collins; Rikiya Yasuoka; Tsutomu Sekine; Mayako Katsuragi
- Cinematography: James London
- Edited by: Michael Schweitzer
- Music by: Barrie Guard
- Distributed by: Troma Entertainment; Lorimar
- Release date: February 24, 1989
- Running time: 96 minutes 103 minutes (Director's cut)
- Country: United States
- Languages: English; Japanese
- Budget: $2.5 million
- Box office: $792,966

The Toxic Avenger Part II is a 1989 American superhero comedy film released by Troma Entertainment. It is the second installment of The Toxic Avenger franchise. It was directed by Lloyd Kaufman and Michael Herz and features The Toxic Avenger in an adventure to Japan to meet his father. Devilman and Cutie Honey creator Go Nagai makes a cameo appearance. The film is also the debut of actor/martial artist Michael Jai White and musician/composer/performance artist Phoebe Legere.

== Plot ==
Melvin Junko has been transformed into the superhero known as the Toxic Avenger. He has made Tromaville a safe place again. His blind girlfriend Claire gets him a job at the Tromaville Center for the Blind.

Apocalypse Inc., a New York-based chemical company, finds Tromaville to be the perfect home for its new takeover site, and has an employee disguised as a PUS deliveryman deliver a bomb into the center. Claire escapes upon learning of the bomb, but everyone else is killed. When the deliveryman and an Apocalypse construction worker arrive to begin their takeover, the Toxic Avenger emerges from the rubble and kills them. This leads to an all-out assault by members of Apocalypse Inc. Toxie defeats the thugs. Displeased, the chairman orders his number one Mona Malfaire to call a meeting with the board of directors and fire the entire personnel department.

Apocalypse Inc. discover Toxie's father had left him and his mother when he was a baby. Using one of their "bad girls" as Toxie's psychologist, they convince Toxie to go to Japan to look for his father even though he has reservations about leaving Claire. Claire tells Toxie to go find his father. Toxie heads to Japan using a windsurfboard and a paper, asking for his father from the worker at a local Japanese restaurant. However, forgetting his passport, he enters Tokyo Godzilla-style, shocking a group of beachgoers. He runs into Masami, who is at first shocked, but befriends him after he saves her from some thugs. She offers to help him find his father.

Apocalypse Inc. takes advantage of Toxie's absence and begins a hostile takeover of Tromaville. People who stand up against them are beaten or killed.

Masami and Toxie find Big Mac Junko, a Japanese man. Toxie is elated until Masami sees a shipment of fish dropped on the floor and discovers cocaine in the fish. Big Mac is a Yakuza leader who delves in drug dealing. Toxie goes through a series of battles against Yakuza enforcers and Kabuki warriors. Using the environment to his advantage, Toxie defeats the entire gang, only leaving him and his father. Big Mac reveals to Toxie a bottle of "anti-Tromatons", which can kill Toxie. Toxie kicks the bottle out of his father's hand and pushes him to a fish butcher, who, excited by the action, kills Toxie's dad by chopping him up. The bottle breaks and Toxie begins to weaken. Masami takes Toxie to a sumo gym, where he is healed and begins training in the art of sumo before saying goodbye to Masami and heading back to Tromaville.

He learns that Malfaire and the "bad girls" are assaulting Claire. He takes on the bad girls while Claire gets the upper hand on Malfaire, incapacitating her. The chairman hires a motorcycle rider named Dark Rider to destroy Tromaville. With nitroglycerin strapped to Dark Rider's back, the plan is for the Dark Rider to burst into City Hall. Toxie hijacks a taxi and after a series of turns and misses, ends up crashing. Toxie hijacks a hovercraft and drives it after the Dark Rider, forcing him to bust into a home, causing the Dark Rider's demise.

The people of Tromaville are elated. A man arrives in Tromaville and is revealed to be Melvin's real father. The Yakuza leader he defeated in Japan was "Big Mac Bunko", who is glad to be reunited with both Melvin and his mom and is happy that Bunko, who had used identity theft against him, is no more. The chairman and Malfaire unsuccessfully attempt to hitch a ride back to New York.

== Cast ==
- John Altamura as The Toxic Avenger / Melvin Junko, a former janitor that was mutated into a deformed superhero. He had the last name Ferd in the last film.
  - Ron Fazio as The Toxic Avenger (voice)
    - Ron Fazio also portrays an Apocalypse Inc. Executive
- Phoebe Legere as Claire, the blind girlfriend of the Toxic Avenger. She is named Sara in the first film.
- Rick Collins as Apocalypse Inc. Chairman, the head of Apocalypse Inc.
- Lisa Gaye as Mona Malfaire, the right-hand woman of the Apocalypse Inc. Chairman.
- Rikiya Yasuoka (Michael Herz, uncredited voice) as Mac "Big Mac" Bunko, a Yakuza leader who is supposedly Melvin's real father.
- Mayako Katsuragi (Patricia Kaufman, uncredited voice) as Masami
- Tsutomu Sekine as Newscaster
- Jessica Dublin as Mrs. Junko, the mother of Melvin
- Jack Cooper as Mac "Big Mac Junko", the estranged father of Melvin Junko
- Don Eckhart as Kid Riding Bike In Opening Scene
- Fernando Antonio, Paul Borghese, Sylvester Covin, William Decker, Joe Fleishaker, Mark Fucile, Marc Allan Ginsberg, Sal Lioni, Doug McDonald, Benny Nieves, Kariim Ratcliff, Michael Jai White, Susan Whitty, Jeremiah Yates as Apocalypse Inc. Executives
- Dan Snow as "Cigar Face", a gangster and old enemy of Toxie who allies with Apocalypse Inc.
- Scott Leva as The Dark Rider (uncredited)
- Lloyd Kaufman as Sumo Wrestler / Voice of fish salesman (uncredited)

== Production ==
When production started, John Altamura played The Toxic Avenger with Ron Fazio doing some doubling mainly for long shots of the character, as he was already cast as an Apocalypse Inc. executive. However, according to a 2001 interview with Fazio, Altamura abused his authority by complaining about the make-up and had threatened some staff members, pushing Kaufman to fire Altamura. Kaufman then hired Fazio to play the Toxic Avenger when production moved to Tokyo, Japan. However, Kaufman kept the scenes with Altamura in the film, hence in the film's opening fight sequence, it is seen that both Fazio and Altamura face against each other with Fazio playing the tiger-striped member of Apocalypse Inc who gets punched Exorcist-style by Altamura's Toxic Avenger. Fazio's voice would be used as the Toxic Avenger.

In addition to Tokyo, filming locations included New York City and New Jersey. Michael Jai White made his film debut in the film and not only acted as a member of Apocalypse Inc., but assisted with the film's fight sequences in New York while Hitoshi Genma coordinated the film's action scenes in Japan.

Lloyd Kaufman was told that the main Japanese actors, Rikiya Yasuoka and Mayako Katsuragi, spoke English. However, upon his shooting the scenes, he learned that Yasuoka and Katsuragi's English was not good enough. During post-production, Lloyd hired his wife Patricia, who also appears in the film as the "blind mother" and at the time, was the New York City Film Commissioner, to dub Katsuragi's voice. Co-creator/producer Michael Herz dubbed Yasuoka's voice.

== Home media ==
The 'Unrated Director's cut' version released on DVD by Troma Entertainment is missing almost all scenes of gore. A version with an extra 10 minutes of gore was released in the 'Tox Box' DVD set.

The Japanese and German releases are the full uncut version.

The 2008 'Complete Toxic Avenger' seven-disc DVD set includes the uncut version and is the same disc found in the 'Tox Box'.

88 Films released the film in 98kb in November 2014 on Blu-ray. The US release of Blu-ray Disc was in High Definition.

== Reception ==
=== Critical response ===
As of April 2024, The Toxic Avenger Part II holds a 0% rating on Rotten Tomatoes based on seven reviews.
