= Silent Madness =

1984 3D slasher film

- Directed by: Simon Nuchtern
- Written by: B. Zimmerman; Bill Milling
- Produced by: Bill Milling; Simon Nuchtern
- Starring: Belinda Montgomery; Viveca Lindfors; Sydney Lassick
- Cinematography: Gerald Feil
- Edited by: Philip Stockton
- Music by: Barry Salmon
- Distributed by: Almi Pictures
- Release date: October 26, 1984
- Running time: 93 minutes
- Country: United States
- Language: English
- Budget: $600,000

Silent Madness is a 1984 American 3D slasher film directed by Simon Nuchtern and starring Belinda Montgomery, Viveca Lindfors, David Greenan, Sydney Lassick, and Solly Marx. One of the later films in the 1980s 3-D revival, Silent Madness was filmed with the ArriVision 3-D camera system.

== Plot ==
In order to keep themselves financially secure, a mental institution in New Jersey has been making use of a "release program", in which the institution allows a handful of less-disabled patients to be released back into society. One day, however, a computer error accidentally leads to an especially unruly and homicidal patient named Howard Johns being discharged, following which he begins murdering everyone he comes across.

Meanwhile, a psychiatrist at the institution, Dr. Joan Gilmore, has found out about the mistake that was made, and quickly gets the administrator, Dr. Anderson, to hold an emergency meeting with the rest of the staff. During the meeting, however, Gilmore is told that Howard Johns apparently died a week prior. Not believing the claims, Gilmore decides to take care of the situation herself. Her investigations lead her to the local newspaper office, where she meets Mark McGowan, who agrees to help her out.

Since Howard had been institutionalised on accounts of several murders that occurred at a sorority house in Barrington, New York, Mark suggests that Gilmore go undercover as a former member of said sorority, hypothesising that Howard will be returning there. She goes along with the plan, and introduces herself to house mother Mrs. Collins and sorority sisters Jane, Cheryl and Pam. Upon asking Collins about the murders, Gilmore is told that Howard was once a troubled custodian of the sorority who had fallen victim to a handful of girls forcing him through a hazing ritual, during which Howard snapped and murdered the girls with a nail gun.

The next morning, whilst exploring the sorority building's boiler room (where the hazing murders happened), Gilmore has an unexpected run-in with Howard, but is able to get away from him. She goes to report the incident to Sheriff Liggett, but he refuses to help out since the hospital has told him that Howard is deceased. Gilmore realises that the staff of the institution are trying to cover up Howard's accidental release, but Ligget nevertheless dismisses her claims. Meanwhile, Anderson has hospital attendants Jesse and Virgil sent off to the sorority house to deal with Gilmore and Howard.

Gilmore heads back to the sorority, and introduces Mark to the girls. Jane asks Mark to drive her to a nearby lake so she can meet up with her sister Susan. Mark agrees to do so, but tells the rest of the girls to lock up and stay together. After Mark and Jane get to the lake, however, they find both Susan and her boyfriend Paul dead (having been killed by Howard earlier). Meanwhile, at the sorority, Howard sneaks out of the basement and kills Cheryl and Pam.

Mark tells Jane to call Sheriff Liggett whilst he goes back to the sorority to save Gilmore. Whilst driving there, however, Jesse and Virgil follow him, having spotted Gilmore's car that he was driving. Upon arriving, Mark is knocked unconscious and restrained by the attendants, who then pursue Gilmore throughout the building. Whilst fleeing, Gilmore encounters Howard, who knocks her unconscious before dragging her into the boiler room and placing her in a trap that will cause an industrial drill to kill her after the lights are turned on. Jesse and Virgil find her, but Jesse is killed whilst sexually assaulting Gilmore after Virgil inadvertently activates the trap. Howard then appears and kills Virgil, before beginning to pursue Gilmore throughout the boiler room.

The chase leads both Gilmore and Howard to the main entrance of the sorority house, where Gilmore manages to overpower and kill Howard. However, Mrs. Collins suddenly appears and begins crying out in anguish. It is revealed that Howard was actually Mrs. Collins's son, and that Collins was the one who had murdered the girls whom had hazed him all those years prior. The emergency services then arrive, and the movie ends with Gilmore and Mark heading back to New Jersey together.

== Cast ==
- Belinda Montgomery as Dr. Joan Gilmore
- Solly Marx as Howard Johns
- David Greenan as Mark McGowan
- Stanja Lowe as Dr. Anderson
- Viveca Lindfors as Mrs. Collins
- Tori Hartman as Pam
- Katherine Kamhi as Jane
- Katie Bull as Cheryl
- Roderick Cook as Dr. Kruger
- Rick Aiello as Michael
- Ed Van Nuys as Dr. Van Dyce
- Dennis Helfend as Virgil
- Philip Levy as Jesse
- Sydney Lassick as Sheriff Liggett
- Paige Price as Lorraine
- Paul DeAngelo as Paul
- Daisy White as Susan
- Elizabeth Kaitan as Barbara

== Production ==
=== Casting ===
In the role of Mrs. Collins, a number of actresses were considered, including Anne Bancroft, Geraldine Fitzgerald, Dorothy Malone, Vera Miles, Yvonne De Carlo, Joan Fontaine, and Maureen O’Sullivan. Shelley Winters temporarily signed on to play the role, but dropped out of the production shortly before filming due to a salary dispute. Viveca Lindfors ultimately was cast in the role. Lynn Redgrave was attached to the project as well to play the role of Dr. Joan Gilmore, but also ultimately declined over a salary dispute, as the part was budgeted at $35,000.

=== Filming ===
The film was shot on location in Nyack, New York on a budget of approximately $600,000.

== Release ==
Silent Madness was released theatrically in St. Louis, Missouri on October 26, 1984. It arrived in Los Angeles, California on November 9, 1984. It opened in New York City the following year, on May 31, 1985.

=== Home media ===
On November 27, 2020, Vinegar Syndrome released Silent Madness on Blu-ray as part of their annual Black Friday sale, marking the film's first home media release on any disc format.
