= Michael Findlay (filmmaker) =

American film director

- Born: August 27, 1937; United States
- Died: May 16, 1977 (aged 39); New York City, New York, United States
- Occupations: Film director, film producer, screenwriter
- Spouse: Roberta Findlay

Michael Findlay (August 27, 1937 – May 16, 1977) was an American filmmaker, producer and screenwriter. Along with his wife Roberta, Findlay created numerous low-budget Z movies in the 1960s and 1970s. They have been described as "the most notorious filmmakers in the annals of sexploitation".

In the mid-to-late 1960s, Findlay was prominent among a small group of underground New York filmmakers (including Joseph W. Sarno, Joseph P. Mawra, and Lou Campa) that produced exploitation "roughies" (early slasher films which combined conventional horror or thriller stories with sadomasochistic sex scenes) for the grindhouse market. Sometimes he would direct under the alias Julian Marsh and act in his own films billed as Robert West. His wife Roberta (a.k.a. Anna Riva) was the cinematographer, co-writer, and supporting actress for many of their films together. They also employed the same actors repeatedly, most notably Uta Erickson, and Marie Brent, a.k.a. Janet Banzet.

The Findlays were friends with George Weiss, producer of Ed Wood's Glen or Glenda and a series of fetishistic Olga films (Olga's House of Shame, Olga's Girls, et al.). In 1964 Weiss encouraged them to make films in this new subgenre of violent sexploitation.

== Early films: 1964–1966 ==
Findlay co-directed his first film, 1964's Body of a Female, with his close friend, John Amero. It tells the story of a sadistic brute who keeps women as prisoners in his home. This film predated both David F. Friedman and Doris Wishman's sexploitation entries by at least a year.

In 1965 he directed The Sin Syndicate, a false documentary about prostitutes turning State's evidence against the Mob, and the infamous Satan's Bed starring a then-unknown Yoko Ono (three years before she met The Beatles' John Lennon). This is actually two films edited together. In the unfinished Judas City, Ono plays the fiancée of a drug pusher who is eventually robbed and raped. Findlay added a secondary story about three addicts on a crime spree who terrorize several women. Roberta Findlay plays one of their victims.

This was followed by Take Me Naked (1966), a lurid story written by Roberta Findlay about a depraved Peeping Tom whose fantasies involve his neighbor (played by Roberta Findlay). Michael Findlay also appears as the "Angel of Hell." The film prominently features passages narrated from Pierre Louÿs' erotic classic The Songs of Bilitis.

== The Flesh trilogy ==
Findlay's breakthrough film was The Touch of Her Flesh (1967), the tale of a cuckolded gun dealer named Richard Jennings (played by Findlay) who is disfigured in a car accident after finding his wife in bed with another man. In recovery, Jennings comes to generalize his hatred of his wife to promiscuous women in general; after he is released, Jennings goes on a killing spree, murdering prostitutes and strippers with a variety of unique implements, including poison-tipped rose thorns, blowdarts, a crossbow, a scimitar, and a buzzsaw. The film – which included numerous non-sequitur sequences of sadomasochistic sex – was unique for its time; most exploitation films up to that time had either exhibited graphic sex or graphic violence, but never combined the two. Findlay's combination of these elements would presage the slasher films of the 1970s, which freely mixed the two elements in a more mainstream medium.

The success of Touch led to two sequels, The Curse of Her Flesh and The Kiss of her Flesh, both released in 1968; both films followed the formula of Jennings recovering from life-threatening injuries sustained at the end of the previous film and returning to kill prostitutes and strippers while plotting elaborate revenge against individuals who were directly involved with his wife or knew of her affair. Kiss was intended to end the series, with a title card informing the viewers that Jennings' demise was positively the end.

Findlay continued to make films about sex and violence with A Thousand Pleasures (1968), and The Ultimate Degenerate (1969), which was largely a remake of Body of a Female.

== Films of the 1970s ==
In the 1970s the Findlays turned toward horror films. One of their efforts, The Slaughter, produced in 1971, was a poorly received cash-in on the Manson murders, depicting the exploits of a murderous biker gang built around a drug cult. The picture was met with such ridicule from the distributor that it sat unreleased for most of the decade. In 1976, Findlay's distributor/producer Allan Shackleton decided to use the film as a means of exploiting then-growing rumors in New York City about snuff films—movies purporting to show the actual murder of a human being, filmed for the sole purpose of being sold and exhibited for financial gain. With an entirely new cast of actors, Shackleton filmed a new ending for The Slaughter, purporting to show the film's crew murdering a girl after the completion of filming. It was then released under the name Snuff, with the tagline "The film that could only be made in South America... where Life is CHEAP". In order to promote the film, Shackleton manufactured controversy around the movie's release, hiring actresses to portray feminists opposed to the film. Shackleton's actresses successfully made it into several local news programs, helping to generate genuine controversy around the film's release. At the premier, Shackleton hired a group of actresses to picket the theater with signs decrying Snuff; the staged protest resulted in a real protest by Women Against Pornography.

Michael Findlay is also the director of the 1974 Yeti slasher movie, Shriek of the Mutilated.

== Roberta Findlay's films ==
Roberta Findlay later went on to direct hardcore pornographic films including Anyone But My Husband (1975), Angel on Fire (1974), A Woman's Torment (1977), and Mystique (1979). She left the adult film industry after the controversial Shauna: Every Man's Fantasy (1985), about the tragic suicide of porn star Shauna Grant. Since then she's made mostly horror and action films such as Tenement, The Oracle (both 1985), Blood Sisters (1987) and Prime Evil (1988).

== Death ==
On May 16, 1977, Michael Findlay was killed in a helicopter accident on the roof of the Pan Am Building in New York City. The accident occurred shortly after the 5:33 PM arrival of the New York Airways helicopter from John F. Kennedy Airport. It was in the process of taking on 21 passengers for the return trip when the landing gear failed and the aircraft tipped on its side while the rotors were still running. Findlay and two other passengers in the process of boarding were slashed to death as the spinning rotors detached and disintegrated. Another male passenger died later in hospital. A woman on the street was killed when hit by falling debris.
