= Angelo D'Alessandro =

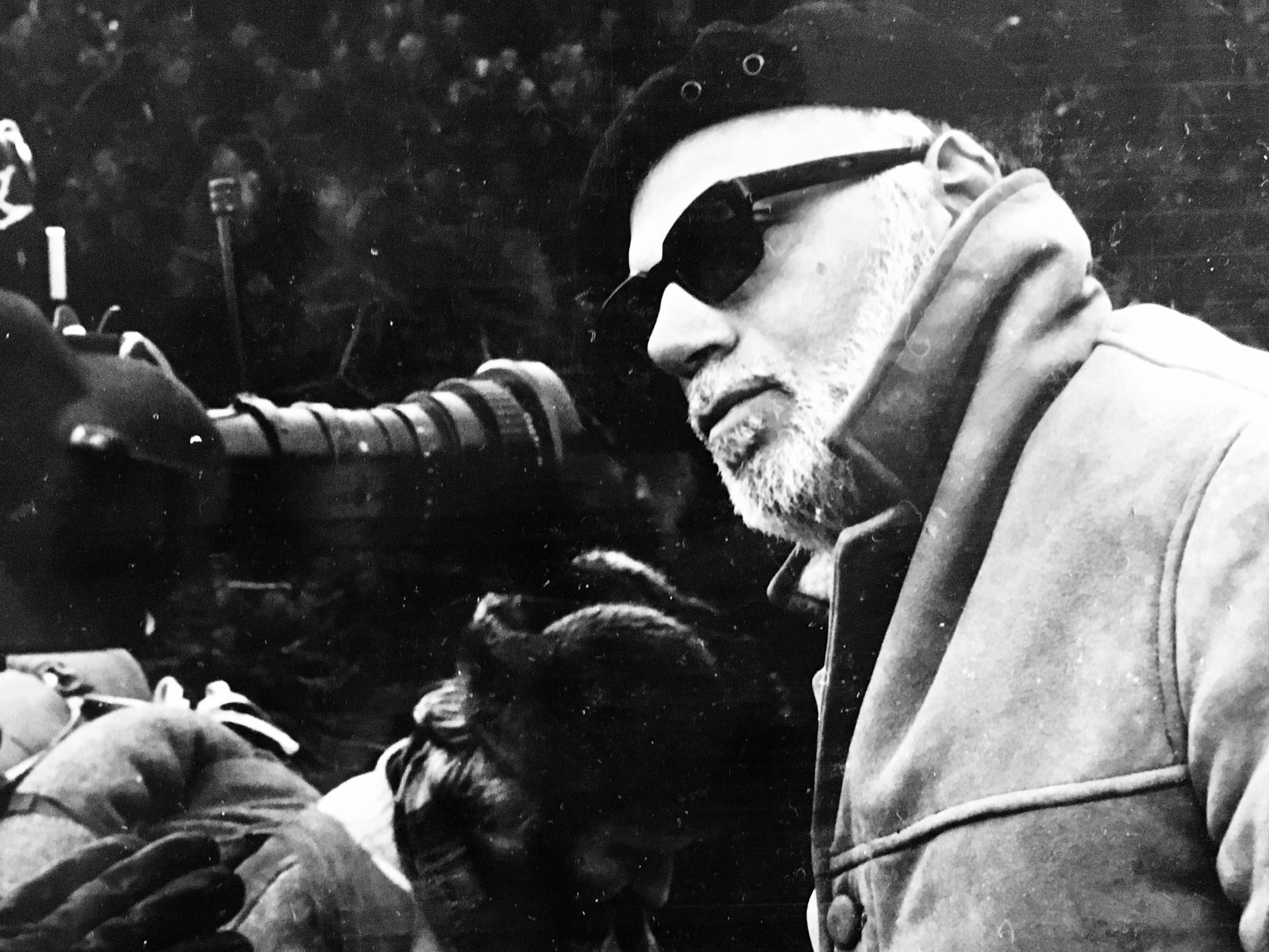
- Angelo D'Alessandro on the set of Jack London - La mia grande avventura (L'avventura del Grande Nord)
- Born: 17 April 1926; Putignano, Apulia, Italy
- Died: 1 February 2011 (aged 84); Rome, Lazio, Italy
- Occupations: Writer and director
- Years active: 1950-1979

Angelo D'Alessandro (1926–2011) was an Italian screenwriter and film director who worked on feature films and television. He worked as assistant director on Federico Fellini's Variety Lights (1950).

== Abridged filmography ==
- At the Edge of the City (1953, Writer)
- I piaceri dello scapolo (1960, Writer)
- Hands over the City (1963) - Balsamo
- Turi and the Paladins (1977, Director)

== Bibliography ==
- Brunetta, Gian Piero. The History of Italian Cinema: A Guide to Italian Film from Its Origins to the Twenty-first Century. Princeton University Press, 2009.
