= Mirella D'Angelo =

Italian actress

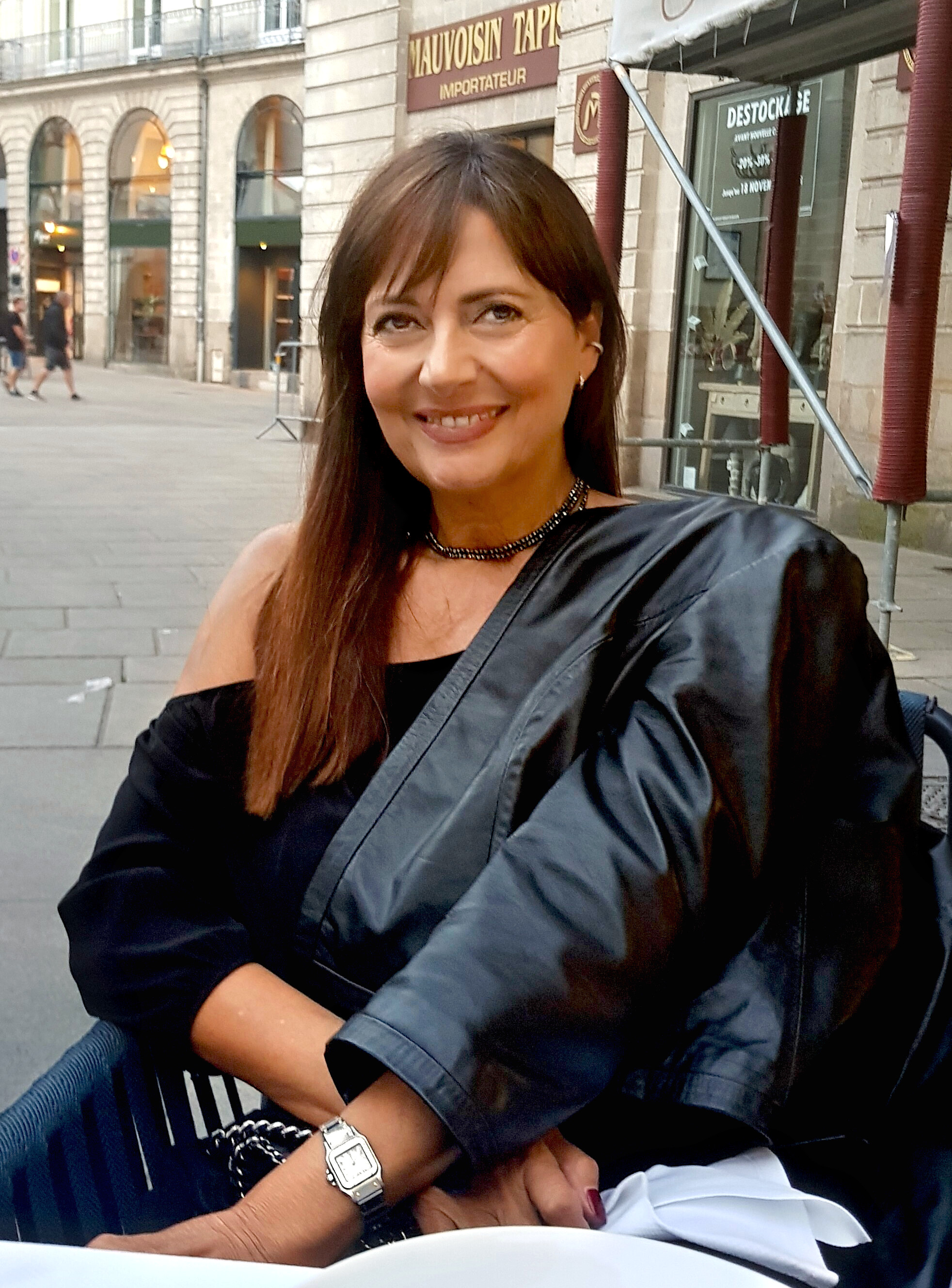
- D'Angelo in 2023
- Born: 16 August 1956 (age 70); Rome, Italy
- Occupation: Actress
- Years active: 1974–present

Mirella D'Angelo (born 16 August 1956) is an Italian actress.

== Career ==
Mirella D'Angelo has appeared in more than twenty films since 1974 and acted in television and theatre. She has appeared in a number of notable films including Le Guignolo with Jean-Paul Belmondo, Apartment Zero with Colin Firth, Caligula with Malcolm McDowell and Helen Mirren, Dario Argento's Tenebrae and Federico Fellini's City of Women.

== Biography ==
After starting out in modeling, which led her at a very young age to live in Paris and London, the young actress made her film debut in 1976 with Operation Jaguar, an Italian thriller that gave her the opportunity to act alongside Maurizio Merli. That same year, she appeared in Caligula, an Anglo-Italian production that quickly caused a scandal both because of its troubled filming and its content, considered daring. The film, released after more than three years of legal disputes, was heavily censored or even completely banned in some countries.

In 1980, Fellini cast her in City of Women, where she starred opposite Marcello Mastroianni. In the following years, she appeared in several French comedies, giving her the opportunity to perform alongside Jean-Paul Belmondo and Richard Berry.

In 1982, she made her first appearance in the giallo genre with Tenebrae by Dario Argento. Her death scene, involving a razor-wielding maniac and heavily featured in promotional material, became one of the most iconic and bloody scenes of the genre.

In 1983, she returned to antiquity with Hercules by Luigi Cozzi, a mythological fantasy in which she played Circe opposite the imposing Lou Ferrigno. In 1988, she appeared alongside Colin Firth in Apartment Zero, an atmospheric thriller inspired by the work of Roman Polanski. She also appeared in Maya, a fantasy film highly representative of the 1990s.

In addition to a few appearances in music videos, Mirella D’Angelo, who trained at the Actor’s Studio, also worked in theater. She performed in Look Back in Anger by John Osborne and Romantic Comedy by Giorgio Albertazzi.

== Filmography ==
=== Cinema ===
- Terminal, directed by Paolo Breccia (1974)
- A Special Cop in Action, directed by Marino Girolami (1976)
- La tigre è ancora viva: Sandokan alla riscossa!, directed by Sergio Sollima (1977)
- Porca società, directed by Luigi Russo (1978)
- Il ritorno di Casanova, directed by Pasquale Festa Campanile (1978)
- Caligula, with Malcolm McDowell and Helen Mirren, directed by Tinto Brass (1979)
- C'est dingue... mais on y va, directed by Michel Gerard (1979)
- Turi and the Paladins, directed by Angelo D'Alessandro (1979)
- Lessons for the Lovelorn, directed by Mario Garriba (1980)
- City of Women, directed by Federico Fellini (1980)
- Le Guignolo, with Jean-Paul Belmondo, directed by Georges Lautner (1980)
- Putain d'histoire d'amour, directed by Gilles Béhat (1981)
- Tenebrae, directed by Dario Argento (1982)
- Hercules, directed by Luigi Cozzi (1983)
- Il cavaliere, la morte e il diavolo, directed by Beppe Cino (1983)
- Apartment Zero, with Colin Firth, directed by Martin Donovan (1988)
- Maya, directed by Marcello Avallone (1989)
- Il ritorno del grande amico, directed by Giorgio Molteni (1990)
- The Pope Must Die, directed by Peter Richardson (1991)
- Dana Lech, directed by Frank Blasberg (1992)
- Hard Men, directed by J.K. Amalou (1996)
- I piccoli maghi di Oz, directed by Luigi Cozzi (2018)
- Caligula: The Ultimate Cut, US (2023)

=== Short films ===
- Smuggler, directed by Florence Dewavrin (1982)
- Lettura in nero, directed by Antonello De Leo (1989)
- Quel buio senza silenzio, directed by Stefano Oreto (1991)
- Sissy directed by Eitan Pitigliani (2022)

== Television ==
- L'étrange monsieur Duvallier, directed by Victor Vicas, (France,1978)
- Stamboul Train, by Graham Greene, directed by Gianfranco Mingozzi (Italy/Hungary, 1980)
- Embassy, directed by Robert Michael Lewis (USA, 1985)
- Turno di notte, directed by Luigi Cozzi (Serie TV) (Italy, 1987)
- The Nightmare Years, directed by Anthony Page (USA, 1989)
- Un cane sciolto, directed by Giorgio Capitani (Italy, 1990)
- Der Schwammerlkönig, directed by Rüdiger Nüchtern (Germany, 1988)
- Harry, directed by Martin Stellman (UK, 1993)
- Flash - Der Fotoreporter, directed by Gero Erhardt (Germany, 1993)
- The Glam Metal Detectives, directed by Peter Richardson (UK, 1995)

== Theatre ==
- Look Back in Anger, by John Osborne, directed by Daniele Griggio (1983)
- Romantic Comedy, by Bernard Slade, directed by Giorgio Albertazzi (1985)

== Music video ==
- Insolito, written and performed by Francesco Di Giacomo (2019), directed by Fabio Massimo Iaquone
