= Lisa Gaye (actress, born 1960) =

American actress

- Born: Baltimore, Maryland, U.S.
- Occupation: Actress
- Years active: 1989-present

Lisa Gaye is an actress known for her role in The Toxic Avenger saga.

== Biography ==
Lisa Gaye was born in Baltimore, Maryland and moved to New York City when she was eighteen years old and she still resides there. Gaye starred in many Troma Entertainment motion pictures.

Shortly after Gaye's arrival in NYC, she was accepted into renowned acting coach Lee Strasberg's Master Class. She studied with him for a few years, being in the last class he taught the day he died. After that, Gaye went to Los Angeles to study at the Beverly Hills Playhouse where she won a scholarship. While in LA, Lisa opened the NOWORDS Studio in the penthouse of downtown's skid row Alexandria Hotel. At NOWORDS she ran a successful art gallery, had poetry readings, produced and acted in avant garde short films, ran still photography shoots and provided a space where artistic creativity flourished.

Upon her return to NYC, Gaye auditioned and won the role of lead villainess Ms. Malfaire in Troma's The Toxic Avenger Part II and The Toxic Avenger Part III: The Last Temptation of Toxie. Immediately a fan favorite, Gaye returned to Troma to play the lead Professor Holt, with her 3 ft. high beehive, in Class of Nuke ’Em High Part II: Subhumanoid Meltdown and Class of Nuke 'Em High 3: The Good, the Bad and the Subhumanoid. It is this role that won her a "Best In B Award" for the USA Network. She continued to work with Troma throughout her career on many of their projects and in their movies.

During this period of time, Gaye was well known on the nightlife circuit of NYC and had many successful parties at the top clubs: Danceteria, Tunnel, Limelight, Life, among others and was frequently in the NY Post's PAGE SIX.

Gaye's interest in the arts brought her the opportunity to be the American curator of a video project Xenographia for the 45th Venice Biennalle. She was featured in Brooke Hunyady's A Portrait Of Peter Beard film for that video installation which continues to be shown worldwide.

Gaye worked with many famous photographers and can be found in Gordon Park's book A Star For Noon.

== Filmography ==
- The Toxic Avenger Part II - Ms. Malfaire
- The Toxic Avenger Part III: The Last Temptation of Toxie - Ms. Malfaire
- Citizen Toxie: The Toxic Avenger IV - Abortion Counselor
- Class of Nuke 'Em High 2: Subhumanoid Meltdown - Professor Holt
- Class of Nuke 'Em High 3: The Good, the Bad and the Subhumanoid - Professor Holt
- Terror Firmer - Casey's Mom
- Sgt. Kabukiman N.Y.P.D. - Stuart's Evil Women
- State of Mind - Ruth/Janis
- Bikini Beach Race - Leanne
