= Turi and the Paladins =

- Directed by: Angelo D'Alessandro
- Written by: Nanni De Stefani
- Cinematography: Eliseo Caponera
- Music by: Mario Pagano
- Production company: Istituto Luce
- Release date: 1979
- Country: Italy
- Language: Italian

Turi and the Paladins (Italian: Turi e i Paladini) is a 1979 Italian family film directed by Angelo D'Alessandro.

== Cast ==
- Rocco Aloisi as Salvatore a 6 anni
- Kitty Arancio as Concettina a 12 anni
- Claudio Baturi as Salvatore a 12 anni
- Rosalino Cellamare as Salvatore a 19 anni
- Riccardo Cucciolla as Don Saverio
- Mirella D'Angelo as Concettina a 19 anni
- Jessica Dublin as Americana
- Gilberto Idonea as Don Alfonso
- Sara Micalizzi as Suor Cecilia
- Francesco Sineri as Don Carmelo

== Bibliography ==
- Brunetta, Gian Piero. The History of Italian Cinema: A Guide to Italian Film from Its Origins to the Twenty-first Century. Princeton University Press, 2009.
