= Roberta Findlay =

American film director

- Born: December 30, 1943 (age 82); New York City, New York, U.S.
- Occupations: Film director, cinematographer, producer, actress
- Spouse: Michael Findlay (m. 1966; died 1977)

Roberta Findlay (née Hershkowitz; born December 30, 1943) is an American film director, cinematographer, producer and actress. She is best known for her work in the exploitation field. Her work has received increasing critical appreciation in recent years.

== Early life ==
Findlay was born Roberta Hershkowitz in Brooklyn, New York City to Hungarian-Jewish immigrant parents, and was raised in the Bronx. She was classically trained on piano as a child, and her parents hoped she would have a career as a musician.

== Career ==
While attending the City College of New York, she met Michael Findlay, a student who had recently transferred there after leaving seminary school, where he was studying to become a Catholic priest. He asked her to perform a piano accompaniment for a silent film screening he was holding on the university campus. The two eventually married and began making films together, with Roberta often working as cinematographer.

By her own account, Roberta's marriage to Michael was tempestuous, and the couple were separated by 1974 due to him suffering "psychological issues." Despite their separation, she continued to occasionally work with him professionally, including as cinematographer on Shriek of the Mutilated (1974). Michael Findlay died in 1977 in a helicopter accident; after his death, she continued to make films, directing the horror films Blood Sisters (1987) and Tenement (1985).

== Select filmography ==
=== Feature films ===
Year	Title	Director	Writer	Cinematographer	Notes	Ref.
1968	The Kiss of Her Flesh	No	Yes	Yes	Credited as Anna Riva	
1969	Crack-Up	No	No	Yes		
1971	The Slaughter	Yes	No	Yes	Credited as Roberto Herz Kowicz	
1974	Invasion of the Blood Farmers	No	No	Yes	Credited as Frederick Douglass	
1974	Shriek of the Mutilated	No	No	Yes		
1976	Snuff	No	No	Yes		
1985	The Oracle	Yes	No	No		
1985	Tenement	Yes	No	No		
1987	Blood Sisters	Yes	No	No		
1988	Lurkers	Yes	No	No		
1988	Prime Evil	Yes	No	No		
1989	Banned	Yes	No	No		

=== Pornography ===
Year	Title	Director	Writer	Cinematographer	Notes	Ref.
1971	The Altar of Lust	Yes	Yes	Yes		
1974	Angel Number 9	Yes	Yes	Yes		
1975	Anyone But My Husband	Yes	Yes	Yes		
1975	Every Inch a Lady	Yes	No	No	Film also attributed to John and Lem Amero	
1977	A Woman's Torment	Yes	Yes	No		
1982	Liquid A$$ets	Yes	Yes	Yes	Co-writer	
1985	Shauna: Every Man’s Fantasy	Yes	No	Yes	Uncredited	
