= Tenement (1985 film) =

- Directed by: Roberta Findlay
- Written by: Joel Bender; Rick Marx
- Produced by: Walter E. Sear
- Starring: Mina Bern; John Fasano; Paul Calderón; Joe Lynn; Walter Bryant; Corinne Chateau; Angel David; Martha De La Cruz
- Cinematography: Roberta Findlay
- Edited by: Walter E. Sear
- Music by: William Fischer; Walter E. Sear
- Release date: 1985
- Running time: 94 minutes
- Country: United States
- Language: English

Tenement (also known as Game of Survival and Slaughter in the South Bronx) is a 1985 American exploitation urban horror film directed by Roberta Findlay.

The film follows the violent chaos that ensues when the tenants of an apartment house in a South Bronx slum rise up against the brutal, drug-pushing street gang that attempts to take over their apartment and terrorize them. The film was given an X rating by the Motion Picture Association of America, and is one of a small number of films to receive such a rating solely for violence.
