= Brick Bronsky =

American actor, film producer, professional wrestler, sports promoter (1964–2021)

Personal information
- Born: Jeffrey Mark Beltzner; April 18, 1964 Bethlehem, Pennsylvania, U.S.
- Died: August 23, 2021 (aged 57) Allentown, Pennsylvania, U.S.

Professional wrestling career
- Ring name(s): Brick Bronsky; Brick Bronski; Jeff Beitzner; Jeff Bronsky; Jeffrey Belzner
- Billed height: 6 ft 2 in (188 cm)
- Billed weight: 245 lb (111 kg)
- Billed from: Pittsburgh, Pennsylvania
- Trained by: Brad Rheingans; Mr. Hito
- Debut: 1985
- Retired: 1998

Jeffrey Mark Beltzner (April 18, 1964 – August 23, 2021), known by his ring name Brick Bronsky, was an American actor, film producer, professional wrestler, and sports promoter. He starred in a string of films for Troma Studios during the early-1990s, most notably, in Sgt. Kabukiman N.Y.P.D. (1990), Class of Nuke 'Em High 2: Subhumanoid Meltdown (1991), and Class of Nuke 'Em High 3: The Good, the Bad and the Subhumanoid (1994); he also had a small role in Jean-Claude Van Damme's The Quest (1996).

Beltzner was a bodybuilder prior to entering pro wrestling. He won a number of power lifting competitions in Pennsylvania and the Tri-State area as a teenager and qualified for the Mr. America bodybuilding competition after becoming Mr. Teenage Pennsylvania in 1984. He eventually turned to professional wrestling after graduating from Penn State University and spent the late-1980s in Canada where he achieved some success wrestling for Stu Hart in Calgary Stampede Wrestling. He was among the small group of wrestlers trained by Mr. Hito and widely considered the strongest wrestler in the territory at the time.

Following the close of Stampede Wrestling, and the subsequent collapse of the NWA territory system, at the end of the decade, Beltzner returned to his home state where he became a mainstay for local independent promotions throughout the 1990s. He often teamed with Doug Flex during his wrestling career and, along with manager G.Q. Bronsky, were collectively known as The Brat Pack; he and Flex later ran the Harrisburg-based International Pro Wrestling together from 1996 until 2004. He and Flex expanded into other areas of sports promotion and, in 1992, they organized the first boxing matches held in the Lehigh Valley region in nearly ten years.

== Early life and education ==
Beltzner was born on April 18, 1964, in Bethlehem, Pennsylvania and attended and graduated from Parkland High School in neighboring South Whitehall Township, where he developed an interest in bodybuilding and later won state and tri-state power lifting competitions. In 1984, Beltzner won the Mr. Teenage Pennsylvania bodybuilding contest.

He went on to graduate from Pennsylvania State University with a degree in health and physical education.

== Career ==
=== Professional wrestling ===
At Penn State, he met his future tag team partner Doug Flex. Both men shared a mutual interest in bodybuilding and professional wrestling and would eventually enter the business together. Following his graduation, he worked as a child-care worker for the Lehigh County detention home before enrolling in a wrestling camp run by Brad Rheingans, a champion amateur wrestler and competitor at the 1976 Summer Olympics. Beltzner subsequently traveled to Canada, where he wrestled as "Mr. Canada" for the next two and a half years. Flex later claimed that "Jeff was as popular as Hulk Hogan is in the United States". He was most visible in Stu Hart's Stampede Wrestling in Calgary, often appearing on its weekly television program, and was "probably the strongest guy in the territory at the time". He received additional training from Mr. Hito, joining him in several six-man matches, and faced many of the toughest Stampede veterans such as Bad News Allen, Gerry Morrow, "Great" Gama Singh and Steve DiSalvo in late-1987 and 1988. According to Dave Meltzer, Beltzner was once ordered to "shoot" on another young wrestler, Brian Pillman, during a live match. After sucker punching Pillman, and "knock[ing] Pillman to the deck", his opponent "got up and tore him to shreds, but suffered a torn triceps in the melee". Pillman left the promotion shortly after this incident.

Beltzner too soon returned to the United States and, at age 24, began working for the World Wrestling Federation. He was mainly used as a preliminary wrestler at various house shows, however, he did make an appearance on the April 29, 1989 edition of WWF Challenge where he and Terry Daniels lost to The Brain Busters (Arn Anderson & Tully Blanchard) at the War Memorial in Syracuse, New York. He was eventually offered a contract after six months. Unhappy with his experience in the WWF, he declined the offer. Critical of the sports entertainment aspect of the organization, he later commented the "WWF was a big letdown. Competition is completely eliminated. There's a lot more to professional wrestling than the phoney stuff you see on TV."

In the 1980s, Troma Studios experienced a surge in popularity due in part to creating its own stars such as The Toxic Avenger and Sgt. Kabukiman. As its financial troubles worsened in the early-1990s, however, Lloyd Kaufman attempted to recreate his earlier success in the form of Jeff Beltzner and later Jane Jensen (Tromeo and Juliet). Beltzner would become the lead star in the Class of Nuke 'Em High series.

=== Partnership with Doug Flex ===
Beltzner reunited with his college friend Doug Flex, who had made his wrestling debut the previous year, and won a number of tag team titles in the NWA's Mid-Atlantic territory and elsewhere including the Canadian International Tag Team Championship in 1988 and 1989, the Galaxy Wrestling Federation Tag Team Championship in 1990 and the North American Wrestling Federation Tag Team Championship in 1991.

Both men were also involved in volunteer work with local youths in the Lehighton area during this time and counseled high school students across the United States about the dangers of drug and steroid abuse. The two would often give lectures at the local high schools of wherever they were wrestling and would donate to a local charity if the promoters received a fee for their appearance. They had both used steroids for several years before serious health risks and side effects forced them to stop. After five years of steroid use, Beltzner developed degenerative connective tissue disease and eventually tore the short head of his biceps off the bone. He was subsequently forced to take 12 to 16 months off to recover from this injury.

In 1996, Beltzner and Doug Flex formed their own promotion, International Pro Wrestling, in Harrisburg, Pennsylvania. It was there that they formed the heel stable "The Brat Pack" with Beltzner's "younger brother" and manager G.Q. Bronsky. The trio eventually made appearances in other promotions throughout the Northeastern United States. Beltzner himself would feud with "Handsome" Frank Stalletto in both IPW and American Commonwealth Wrestling before becoming the promotion's first heavyweight champion on November 30, 1996, in New Britain, Connecticut by defeating Dave Powers in a one-night tournament.

Beltzner was one of the top stars of the promotion during its run and his fans called themselves the "Brick Clique". He remained champion for over a year and defended the title against a number of independent stars including Frank Staletto and 911; while champion, he was the first man to draw blood from 911. On December 5, 1997, Beltzner lost the title to King Kong Bundy in Jim Thorpe, Pennsylvania after G.Q. Bronsky turned on Beltzner by hitting him with a steel chair and causing the breakup of "The Brat Pack".

=== Sports promotion ===
Beltzner, Flex and John O'Mara, who was a local standout athlete, began promoting sporting events from their Lehighton, Pennsylvania gym The Racquet and Fitness Factory in early 1992. On February 9, 1992, they also held their first boxing card featuring the Twin Mountain Boxing Club of Bowmanstown as well as clubs from Lebanon, Shenandoah, Scranton, Bethlehem, Allentown and Reading for 9–12 bouts. These were the first boxing matches held in the area since October 1984. They also held a wrestling show at the gym on March 22 to raise money for the Carbon County Association of Retarded Citizens. Flex faced Satanic Warrior while Beltzner wrestled Morgus the Maniac. The card also featured wrestlers from the Wrestling Independent Network and independent wrestlers including The Cheetah Kid, J.T. Smith and Cream Team (Dino Casanova & Rip Sawyer).

That summer, he and Flex became involved in a local zoning controversy involving their gym. On August 17, local building inspector Peter Kropf sent a certified letter to Keith Boyer and the four people leasing the building that the building had numerous violations and that Boyers had 45 days to bring it into compliance with state and local codes or face daily fines of up to $1,000. Kropf also claimed that Boyer never secured a necessary permit when he opened a gym in the former silk mill in 1983. The three-story brick building housed a furniture-stripping business as well as the gym. Town officials raised concerns that the building may be unsafe, such as the absence of proper fire exits, to accommodate the hundreds of people that the gym was bringing in on the weekends. Flex was the first to sign and acknowledge the town's letter.

Beltzner also continued acting and returned to star in the third and final film in the Class of Nuke 'Em High series, Class of Nuke 'Em High 3: The Good, the Bad and the Subhumanoid (1994). In his last feature film for Troma Studios, he played both the character of Roger Smith and those of his twin sons, Adlai and Dick Smith. That same year, with fellow professional wrestler Tony Halme, he also had a minor role in Joe Coppoletta's independent action film Death Match (1994), starring Ian Jacklin, Martin Kove and Matthias Hues. Two years later, he appeared in Jean-Claude Van Damme's The Quest (1996), portraying the champion fighter brought to the underground fighting tournament from Russia.

=== Acting ===
While recovering from his bicep injury, Beltzner auditioned for Sgt. Kabukiman N.Y.P.D. (1990) then being shot by Lloyd Kaufman and Michael Herz in New York. His first film role resulted in a standout performance as the thug-for-hire "Jughead". The following year he starred in Class of Nuke 'Em High 2: Subhumanoid Meltdown (1991), alongside co-star Leesa Rowland, as student journalist Roger Smith. Though the film received mixed reviews, Beltzner's performance gained favorable receptions from critics. Beltzner himself, who performed all his own stunts, credited Troma with making him a better performer when he resumed his pro wrestling career in the mid-1990s.

Suffering back and neck injuries resulting from G.Q. Bronsky's attack, Beltzner moved to California to resume his acting career. In 2000, he reprised his role as "Jughead" from Sgt. Kabukiman N.Y.P.D. on Troma's Edge TV. He also began producing his own film projects with independent film studio Evolving Pictures Entertainment. As vice president of the studio, he was the executive producer on Love Conquers Paul (2002) and Where's Angelo? (2003), and starred in Spin Cycle.

In January 2012, Beltzner gave an interview for Troma's official website discussing his experiences working with the studio. He also introduced his wife Donna and their four children. Six months later, Troma announced plans for a Return to Nuke 'em High sequel. Fans of the previous movies became very vocally active about Bronsky reprising his role from the sequels.

As of 2017, he has been attached as a co-producer to its latest film Mad Monster Party Re-make. He was also attached to produce Sadako and the Magic of Paper Cranes, written by Malcolm Clarke, and The 'Necroscope' 4-D Motion Picture, for Evolving Pictures Entertainment.

== Death ==
Beltzner went into a coma on August 22, 2021, in Allentown, Pennsylvania. The following day, Hannibal TV reported that Beltzner died at the age of 57 from COVID-19 in the morning hours of August 23. His death was also confirmed by fellow Stampede Wrestling alumnus Jonathan Holliday.

== Filmography ==
Film
Year	Film	Role	Notes
1990	Sgt. Kabukiman N.Y.P.D.	'Jughead'	
1991	Class of Nuke 'Em High 2: Subhumanoid Meltdown	Roger Smith	
1994	Class of Nuke 'Em High 3: The Good, the Bad and the Subhumanoid	Roger Smith / Adlai Smith / Dick Smith	
1994	Death Match	Vinnie's Bodyguard	
1996	The Quest	Russian Fighter	
2004	Spin Cycle	Officer Shasta	
2013	Return to Nuke 'Em High Volume 1	Dick Smith	

== Championships and accomplishments ==
- Galaxy Wrestling Federation
  - GWF Tag Team Championship (1 time) – with Doug Flex
- International Pro Wrestling
  - IPW Heavyweight Championship (1 time, first)
- North American Wrestling Federation
  - NAWF Tag Team Championship (1 time) – with Doug Flex
- Other
  - Canadian International Tag Team Championship (2 times) – with Doug Flex
- Pro Wrestling Illustrated
  - PWI ranked him # 442 of the 500 best singles wrestlers of the PWI 500 in 1998
  - PWI ranked him # 354 of the 500 best singles wrestlers of the PWI 500 in 1997
  - PWI ranked him # 377 of the 500 best singles wrestlers of the PWI 500 in 1996
  - PWI ranked him # 394 of the 500 best singles wrestlers of the PWI 500 in 1992
