= Jessica Dublin =

American actress (1918–2012)

- Born: July 9, 1918; New York City, New York, U.S.
- Died: July 21, 2012 (aged 94); New York City, New York, U.S.
- Occupation: Actress
- Years active: 1969-2004 (film)
- Spouse: Max Dublin
- Children: 2

Jessica Dublin (July 9, 1918 – July 21, 2012) was an American actress who appeared in a number of Italian films.

== Biography ==
Dublin was born in New York City to Hungarian immigrant parents. Her mother was a cellist, and her father worked in the construction business. She was married Max Dublin, an electrician who worked internationally, which led to the couple living abroad in numerous European countries.

While living in Rome, Dublin enrolled at the Arts Academy and began studying acting. While visiting the Cinecittà film studios, Dublin was recruited by a director. She began her career starring in several spaghetti westerns, as well as having minor bit parts in Fellini Satyricon (1969), Catch-22 (1970). She had supporting roles in They Call Me Trinity (also 1970) and The Last Rebel.

== Filmography ==
Year	Title	Role	Notes
1969	Fellini Satyricon		Uncredited
1969	The Damned	Nurse	
1970	Cerca di capirmi		
1970	Fragment of Fear	American Matron #1	
1970	Defeat of the Mafia	Prostitute	
1971	The Last Rebel	Ruby, Pearl's partner	
1971	Trinity Is Still My Name	'Farrah' the Mother	
1972	So Sweet, So Dead	Rossella	
1972	La mala ordina	Miss Kenneth	
1973	Io e lui	Trotti's Wife	
1973	Il sesso della strega	Evelyn Hilton	
1973	The Sensual Man	Prostitute on the road	
1974	Psychi kai sarka (Esy ki ego)		
1976	Land of the Minotaur	Mrs. Zagros	
1976	Zo gia ton erota		
1976	The Hook	Blonde Lady Friend Of Kostas	
1976	Death Has Blue Eyes	Geraldine Steinwetz	
1976	Erotika zevgaria		
1976	Island of Death	Patricia	
1977	The Fruit is Ripe	Lady in Hotel	Uncredited
1977	Death Steps in the Dark	Defilè personnel	Uncredited
1978	The Greek Tycoon	Woman on Tomasis's Boat	Uncredited
1979	Turi and the Paladins	Americana	
1979	To hamogelo tis Pythias		
1980	Savage Hunt	Hotel Manager	
1985	The Electric Chair	Mother	
1988	Rejuvenatrix	Ruth Warren	
1988	Troma's War	Dottie	
1989	Escape from Safehaven	Mama	
1989	The Toxic Avenger Part II	Mrs. Junko	
1989	The Toxic Avenger Part III: The Last Temptation of Toxie	Mrs. Junko	
1991	Voodoo Dolls	Blanche Trousdale	
1997	The Hotel Manor Inn		
1998	Somewhere in the City		
1998	Aphrodisiac	Mrs. Adler	
1999	A Clown in Babylon	Mother	
2002	God Is on Their Side	Rabbi's Wife	
2014	The Deviants	Violet Scuttleby	(final film role, filmed in 1994)

== Bibliography ==
- Pitts, Michael R. Western Movies: A Guide to 5,105 Feature Films. McFarland, 2012.
