= The Toxic Avenger Part III: The Last Temptation of Toxie =

1989 comedy film

- Theatrical release poster
- Directed by: Lloyd Kaufman; Michael Herz
- Written by: Lloyd Kaufman; Michael Herz
- Produced by: Lloyd Kaufman; Michael Herz
- Starring: Ron Fazio; Phoebe Legere; John Altamura; Rick Collins; Lisa Gaye; Jessica Dublin; Michael Kaplan
- Cinematography: James London
- Edited by: Michael Schweitzer
- Music by: Christopher De Marco
- Production company: Troma Entertainment
- Distributed by: Troma Entertainment
- Release date: November 10, 1989 (New York City)
- Running time: 102 minutes
- Country: United States
- Language: English
- Budget: $500,000
- Box office: $363,561

The Toxic Avenger Part III: The Last Temptation of Toxie is a 1989 American superhero comedy film and the third installment of The Toxic Avenger franchise. It was directed by Lloyd Kaufman and Michael Herz.

The title is a play on that of the 1988 film The Last Temptation of Christ. In the film, the depressed Toxic Avenger needs to secure sufficient funds for his girlfriend's surgery. He agrees to work for a corrupt chemical corporation, and settles into a yuppie lifestyle, until he realizes that his boss is the Devil, who challenges him to a video game-inspired duel.

== Plot ==
Things have become peaceful again in Tromaville, putting Melvin Junko the Toxic Avenger into depression, as he can no longer fight crime and fails at normal jobs such as auto mechanic and babysitter. Claire, his blind girlfriend, may be able to see again thanks to a new groundbreaking surgery, but it will cost $357,000. Toxie takes a job as a spokesman for Apocalypse Inc., the New York-based chemical company he defeated before, since he will be paid enough for Claire's surgery. He signs the contract in his own blood. Claire has her surgery. For the first time, she sees Toxie and falls even more in love with him.

As Apocalypse Inc. comes in to promote their chemicals, the people of Tromaville are shocked to see their hero, The Toxic Avenger, agreeing with Apocalypse. Toxie's ego has inflated to a point, and he has become a yuppie. Claire unsuccessfully confronts Toxie. When Toxie sees a group of kids knocking down a poster of him and kicking it, he finally realizes what has happened. Toxie remembers a saying at church, which makes him decide to once again clean up Tromaville. He earns the trust of the people of Tromaville once again by killing a gang of Apocalypse Inc. goons who were holding hostages at the Tromaville Video Store.

He now faces the Chairman, who reveals he is actually the Devil, a green-skinned demon, and challenges Toxie to his favorite video game, "The Five Levels of Doom". The first level, Earth, involves getting sucked into the ground. When Toxie gets his head out of the ground, Mona Malfaire orders an Apocalypse thug to decapitate Toxie with a mower but it proves unsuccessful. The second level, Fire, has both Toxie and the Devil set on fire. Toxie is saved by some Tromaville residents, who douse him with water. With the Devil still on fire and laughing hysterically, Toxie resorts to urinating on the Devil, extinguishing the flames.

In the third level, Wind, the Devil kidnaps the kids of Tromaville, sends them to a mountain by bus, and unleashes strong winds that risk putting the bus over the mountain. Toxie arrives at the cliff and has the kids escape via the back door. Malfaire, in an attempt to shoot down Toxie and the kids, is crushed by the bus when it falls down the cliff. In the fourth level, Water, Toxie is put into a massive puddle in an attempt to drown him. However, Toxie escapes using a Sumo trick he learned in Japan.

The Devil unleashes the final level, in which he transforms the Toxic Avenger back into Little Melvin, who once again becomes the victim of bullying, now by Apocalypse Inc. When Claire attempts to intervene, she is once again rendered blind. While Melvin is getting picked on, Claire returns home and finds the contract. She finds an escape clause that will allow termination by an act of God. An angel, disguised as a messenger, arrives and gives Melvin a scroll. It begins to rain. Melvin is transformed back into the Toxic Avenger and Claire is able to once again see.

Melvin defeats the Devil, ripping his skin off to expose rats and bugs all over his carcass. He decapitates the Devil and throws his head to Tokyo, where a news reporter demonstrates a new hair growth formula to a customer. Having defeated Apocalypse Inc., Melvin and Claire celebrate by getting married and are now "monster and wife".

== Cast ==
- John Altamura as The Toxic Avenger / Melvin Junko, a janitor that was mutated into a deformed superhero.
  - Ron Fazio as the voice of The Toxic Avenger
    - Ron Fazio also portrays an Apocalypse Inc. Executive
  - Michael J. Kaplan as "Little" Melvin Junko
- Phoebe Legere as Claire, the blind girlfriend of Melvin.
- Rick Collins as Apocalypse Inc. Chairman / The Devil, the head of Apocalypse Inc.
- Lisa Gaye as Mona Malfaire, the right-hand woman of the Apocalypse Inc. Chairman
- Jessica Dublin as Mrs. Junko, the mother of Melvin.
- Dan Snow as Cigar Face, a gangster who allies with Apocalypse Inc.
- Paul Borghese as Lou Sipher, an Apocalypse Inc. executive
- Fernando Antonio, Sylvester Covin, William Decker, Joe Fleishaker, Mark Fucile, Marc Allen Ginsberg, Sal Lioni, Doug McDonald, Benny Nieves, Kariim Ratcliff, Michael Jai White, Susan Whitty, and Jeremiah Yates as Apocalypse Inc. executives

== Home media ==
The film was later re-released as part of the 'Tox Box' DVD set and the 'Complete Toxic Avenger' 7-disc DVD set.

== Reception ==
Horror News said, "if you're a big fan of the original Toxic Avenger, and you're looking for more, I'd head straight for Citizen Toxie. That is, unless you have a lot of time on your hands."
