= Phoebe Legere =

American singer-songwriter

Phoebe Hemenway Legere
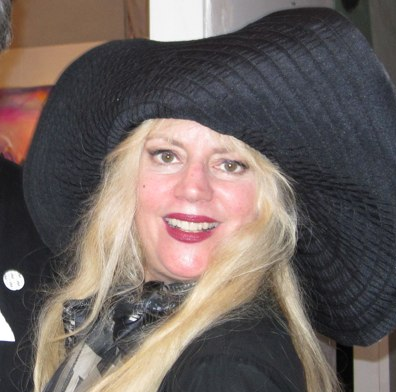
- Legere
- Occupation: Multidisciplinary Artist
- Notable work: Foundationfornewamericanart.org

Phoebe Hemenway Legere is an American pioneer of multi-disciplinary art. She is a Juilliard-educated composer, soprano, pianist and accordionist, painter, poet, and film maker. A graduate of Vassar College with a four octave vocal range, Legere has recorded for Mercury Records in England, and for Epic, Island, Rizzoli, Funtone, ESP Disk and Einstein Records in the United States. Legere plays seven musical instruments and has released 15 CDs of original music. She has appeared on National Public Radio, CBS Sunday Morning, PBS's City Arts, WNYC's Soundcheck, Charlie Rose and in films by Troma, Island Pictures, Rosa von Praunheim, Ela Troyano and Ivan Galietti, Abel Ferrara, Jonathan Demme, Ivan Reitman and many others. Legere is of Acadian and Abenaki descent. She is a standard bearer of the Acadian and Abenaki renaissance in America.

== History ==
Legere's parents were artists and her grandparents were musicians. She began piano lessons at age 3, and learned the techniques of oil painting and draftsmanship when she was age 5. By age 9 Legere was a professional musician. She had her debut at Carnegie Hall at age 16. At 17 she became the Resident Composer for the Wooster Group working 9-5 M-F with Willem Defoe, Spalding Gray, Richard Schechner, Victor Turner and Ron Vawter. This grounding in experimental theater, performance art and music was the basis for Phoebe's MONAD, an all girl Performance Art rock band. While still a teenager she invented "Total Art Synthesis" a Universal Field Theory of the Arts. She was signed to Nemperor/Epic Records by Nat Weiss who was co-founder of Apple Records with Brian Epstein and John Lennon. She was a cultural leader in the East Village Renaissance. Her band Monad performed opening night at the Pyramid Club on Avenue A. She had formative friendships with Larry Rivers, Allen Ginsburg, Peter Beard, Don Cherry, Keith Haring, Jean-Michel Basquiat, Andy Warhol, Joni Mitchell, Billy Joel, Crystal Field, David Bowie and many others.

As the opening act for David Bowie on his 1990 Sound+Vision Tour US tour, Legere played her original songs for 20,000 people a night. A huge forklift brought a white grand piano to the stage, where she performed with her seminal punk-rock band, MONAD:The Four Nurses of the Apocalypse.

In 2000, with composer Morgan Powell, she co-wrote The Waterclown – a musical setting of her epic poem about water issues, "The Waterclown" – for the Cleveland Chamber Symphony.

Beginning in 2001, Legere worked as Head Writer, on-air host, and interviewer for Roulette TV, a collection of video programs broadcast online and on New York City cable television, that captures the creative process of live performance at "the extreme frontier edge of art and music" and is dedicated to experimental art and music. Legere's musical invention the Sneakers of Samothrace were the subject of one episode of the programs on 9 December 2007. She was interviewed afterward by David Behrman, an American composer and pioneer of computer music, revealing that her first job was resident composer for The Wooster Group and discussing in detail their influence on her art making.

Legere is Founder and archivist for the New York Underground Museum (founded 2006).

In 2013, she created The Shamancycle, a four-wheeled alternative vehicle designed in the form of a moving giant eagle sculpture constructed from repurposed metal and powered by alternative energy and having room for 15 people, the idea for which came to her in a dream.

In 2015, Legere appeared on It's Me, Hilary: The Man Who Drew Eloise, an HBO documentary produced by Lena Dunham about Hilary Knight who is best known as the illustrator of Kay Thompson's Eloise series of children's books.

Legere was touring in 2017, bringing art and music to the children in low income communities on behalf of her nonprofit Foundation for New American Art, founded in 2016.

She wrote and starred in the play Speed Queen: The Joe Carstairs Story, performing as multiple characters in a musical about the life of Marion Barbara 'Joe' Carstairs (1900–1993), the wealthy British power boat racer known for her speed and lavish lifestyle. The production combined storytelling, painting, sculpture, movie stars, costumes, and music. Legere performed this transdisciplinary play at Dixon Place. Legere's newest Performance Art work The Fish Who Saved New York premiered at the Waterfront Museum on June 28, 2026.

== Personal life ==
Legere is single. She has never been married. She is the aunt of "Criminal" and "This Is Love" podcaster Phoebe Judge.

== Discography ==
Studio albums

- Phoebe Legere (1993) (re-released as 1000 Kisses in 1996)
- Last Tango in Bubbleland (1997)
- Blue Curtain (2000)
- Children of the Dawn (2007)
- Ooh La La Coq Tail (2010)
- East Village/East Berlin (2012)
- Heart of Love (2017)
- 2 Pianos (2025)
- Girl Power (2026)

With Four Nurses of the Apocalypse

- Armageddon A Go Go (1995)

With Jim Staley

- Blind Pursuits (2001) (also featuring Borah Bergman)

With The Tone Road Ramblers

- Dancing with the Ramblers (2008)
- The Common Root (2012)

Singles and EPs

- Trust Me (1986)
- Blond Fox (1987)
- Marilyn Monroe (1989)
- L 'Opera Légere / Injecticide (1995)
- Beautiful Nightmare (1995)
- Amazing Love (1997)
- Ultra Romantic Parallel Universe (2009)
- Acadian Moon (2015)

Demos

- Good Nurse

== Plays ==
- In 2001, Legere received a NYSCA grant to write The Queen of New England, an experimental multimedia opera about the Massachusetts Native American Holocaust.
- Her musical, Hello Mrs. President, about the first African American woman president of the United States played four times in New York City. In 1991, the first woman president was played by Rock and Roll Hall of Fame star LaVerne Baker.
- Her musical, Shakespeare and Elizabeth, about the life of Elizabeth l, premiered at Theater for the New City on December 5, 2013.
- Speed Queen, performed in March 2018.
- The Fish Who Saved New York, performed on June 28, 2026, at the Waterfront Museum.

== Filmography ==
Year	Title	Role	Notes
1988	Mondo New York	Herself	Performing "Marilyn Monroe" live.
1989	The Toxic Avenger Part II	Claire	
1989	The Toxic Avenger Part III: The Last Temptation of Toxie	Claire	
1989	Beyond Vaudeville	Herself	Episode #1.17
1989	Nelson Sullivan's Video Diaries	Herself	Documentary
1990	King of New York	Piano Player	
1990	Wogan	Herself	Episode #10.55
1990	The Joe Franklin Show	Herself	Halloween Special 1990
1991	Sgt. Kabukiman N.Y.P.D.	Waitress	Uncredited
1993	The Word	Herself	Episode #3.17
1997	Le Marquis de Slime	Creator, Str	Short film
1998	The Bar Channel		Short Film
1998	Sin City Spectacular	Herself	Episode #1.16
2005	The Naked Brothers Band: The Movie	David's Mom	
2008	The Imaginary Opera	Herself	Live compilation with Kathy Supové and Oliver Lake
2014	Wie ich lernte, die Zahlen zu lieben	Herself	English title: Germans Taste the Best
2025	Mr. Melvin	Claire	Re-edit of The Toxic Avenger Parts II and III

2025 | The Gender Symphony | Author, Director, Animator, Music
