= Invasion of the Blood Farmers =

- Directed by: Ed Adlum
- Screenplay by: Ed Adlum; Ed Kelleher
- Produced by: Ed Adlum
- Starring: Norman Kelley; Tanna Hunter; Bruce Detrick; Jack Neubeck; Paul Craig Jennings
- Distributed by: NMD Film Distributing Co.
- Release date: 1972
- Country: United States

Invasion of the Blood Farmers is a 1972 horror film directed by Ed Adlum and written by Adlum and Ed Kelleher.

== Plot ==
In the small town of Jefferson Valley in Downstate New York, a number of civilians start going missing over the course of a few weeks. One day, a man covered in blood stumbles into the bar screaming before abruptly collapsing and dying. During the investigation, local scientist Roy Anderson discovers that the man's blood cells have been reproducing at an impossibly fast rate.

Later that day, a strange man dressed as a farmer approaches the house where Roy lives, only to be chased off into the woods by Roy's dog Buster. The farmer beats Buster to death with a cane in self-defense, but unknowingly drops a mysterious antique key whilst disposing of the dog's body. The next morning, Roy's daughter Jenny finds Buster's body strung up outside their front door. Jenny's fiancé Don runs off into the woods to try and find the culprit, and finds the key the farmer had dropped.

It is revealed that the farmer, named Egon, is part of a group of druids known as the Sangroids. Their leader, Creton, is planning to resurrect their dead queen, Onhorrid, by kidnapping civilians and taking them to the farm where they hold their meetings before draining them of their blood and pumping it into the queen's body, after which she will be restored to purity with the help of a "host" that the Sangroids have yet to find. Creton scolds Egon for losing the "Key of Menanon", which is an important item needed for the resurrection process. Don shows Roy the key he found, Roy calls a friend named Kinski to identify the type of metal the key is made from, not knowing that Kinski is actually one of the Sangroids (who also goes by the name of Sontag). After convincing Roy that the key is merely a cheap toy, Sontag takes it back to Creton.

The next day, Roy shows Don that he has discovered that a mixture of "iodine and household ammonia" causes the blood cells of the dead man from the bar to shrink at a rate just as fast. Whilst on a date, Don and Jenny are then kidnapped by the Sangroids, who plan to use Jenny as their "host" for the queen. Roy learns of their kidnapping, however, and tracks down the Sangroids at a quarry, where the queen is resurrected. Roy dumps a sample of the mixture onto the queen, destroying her and killing the Sangroids.

== Cast ==
- Norman Kelley as Dr. Roy Anderson
- Tanna Hunter as Jenny Anderson
- Bruce Detrick as Don Tucker
- Paul Craig Jennings as Creton
- Richard Erickson as Sontag
- Jack Neubeck as Egon
- Warren D'Oyly-Rhind as Ogmar
- Frank Iovieno as Chief Spano
- Cynthia Fleming as Queen Onhorrid

== Production ==
Prior to producing the film, Ed Adlum had a minor hit novelty song with his band the Castle Kings and worked as an editor for Cashbox magazine. His first entry into film production was for Blonde on a Bum Trip which he co-produced with Jack Bravman. In the offices of Cashbox magazine, Adlum began developing the script for Invasion of the Blood Farmers with his co-worker Ed Kelleher.

In the film's original script the blood farmers were going to be aliens from outer space. Within the first week of shooting, Adlum stated that they would not have enough money to have any outer space content in the film and had it changed to being about druids instead of aliens. Adlum has stated the cast primarily stuck to the script, with the exception of Dick Erickson (playing Kinski) who could not remember his lines and needed to use cue cards.

The film was shot primarily on weekends using Adlum's own house in Westchester County and woods north of New York City.

== Release ==
After trying to sell the film to distributors, Adlum eventually met with Nick Demetroules who Adlum stated he did not have good relations with. Newspapers advertisements promoting the film were released as early as June 7, 1972, in Burlington, Vermont.

Adlum spoke about home video releases of the film in 2012, stating that he "never sold VCR or DVD rights to anybody. Every single copy is a knock off. And what's funny about those knock offs, is they all begin with an FBI disclaimer. It's like counterfeiting money and then putting on there, "Counterfeiting money will put you in jail.""

The film was released on Blu-Ray by Severin in 2019.
