= The Farmer's Daughters (GLOW wrestlers) =

American professional wrestlers

Amy the Farmer's Daughter
- Born: Trudy Adams; U.S.
- Occupations: Professional wrestler, actress
- Years active: 1987–1991, 2011
- Professional wrestling career
- Website: GLOW official

Sally the Farmer's Daughter
- Born: Beckie Mullen; U.S.
- Died: July 27, 2020 (aged 55)
- Occupation: Professional wrestler
- Years active: 1986–1990
- Professional wrestling career
- Website: GLOW official

Babe the Farmer's Daughter
- Born: Ursa Bamby Hayden; 1966; Santa Monica, California, U.S.
- Died: December 3, 2022 (aged 56)
- Occupations: Professional wrestler, actress, and businesswoman
- Years active: 1986–2022
- Children: 1
- Professional wrestling career
- Website: GLOW official

The Farmer's Daughters were three GLOW good girls (babyface) kayfabe sisters known as Amy The Farmer's Daughter, Babe The Farmer's Daughter and Sally the Farmer's Daughter who wrestled for Gorgeous Ladies of Wrestling (GLOW) in the late 1980s and early 1990s. They wore cut-off jeans, white running shoes (though Amy and Sally sometimes wrestled barefoot), and farm outfits. When the glow raps and show intros occurred the Farmer's Daughters would talk about their time on their farms and things about them.

== Glow careers ==
Sally who was played by Beckie Mullen started wrestling in GLOW during season 1. Amy who was played by Trudy Adams appeared during season 2 of GLOW and would often team with California Doll who would often win their matches. Babe who was played by Ursula Hayden appeared during season 3 and would often team with Sally.

== Aftermath ==
After Amy left GLOW she went to Powerful Women of Wrestling (POWW) promotion, where she had a successful career and became known as Brandi Mae. Sally left GLOW after season 1, but returned and wrestled during season 3, before leaving again. Babe wrestled for GLOW until season 4 in 1990 when GLOW stopped being broadcast.

In 2001 Babe purchased the GLOW company from Meshulam Riklis. and wrestled three matches on the Independent circuit in July 2011 in Edmonton, Alberta. Sally died on July 27, 2020, from cancer at age 55. Babe died from on December 3, 2022, also from cancer at the age of 56.
