= List of GLOW characters =

GLOW is an American television series created by Liz Flahive and Carly Mensch, based on the women's wrestling promotion Gorgeous Ladies of Wrestling (GLOW). The following is a list of characters from the series.

== Cast ==
Actor	Character	Seasons		
Actor	Character	1	2	3
Alison Brie	Ruth Wilder	Main	Main	Main
Betty Gilpin	Debbie Eagan	Main	Main	Main
Sydelle Noel	Cherry Bang	Main	Main	Main
Britney Young	Carmen Wade	Main	Main	Main
Marc Maron	Sam Sylvia	Main	Main	Main
Britt Baron	Justine Biagi	Recurring	Main	Main
Kate Nash	Rhonda Richardson	Recurring	Main	Main
Gayle Rankin	Sheila the She-Wolf	Recurring	Main	Main
Kia Stevens	Tammé Dawson	Recurring	Main	Main
Jackie Tohn	Melanie Rosen	Recurring	Main	Main
Chris Lowell	Bash Howard	Recurring	Recurring	Main
Sunita Mani	Arthie Premkumar	Recurring	Recurring	Recurring
Ellen Wong	Jenny Chey	Recurring	Recurring	Recurring
Kimmy Gatewood	Stacey Beswick	Recurring	Recurring	Recurring
Rebekka Johnson	Dawn Rivecca	Recurring	Recurring	Recurring
Marianna Palka	Reggie Walsh	Recurring	Recurring	Recurring
Bashir Salahuddin	Keith Bang	Recurring	Recurring	Recurring
Rich Sommer	Mark Eagan	Recurring	Recurring	Recurring
Andrew Friedman	Glen Klitnick	Recurring	Recurring	
Casey Johnson	Billy Offal	Recurring	Recurring	
Shakira Barrera	Yolanda Rivas		Recurring	Recurring
Victor Quinaz	Russell Barroso		Recurring	Recurring
Paul Fitzgerald	Tom Grant		Recurring	
Annabella Sciorra	Rosalie Biagi		Recurring	
Horatio Sanz	Ray		Recurring	
Geena Davis	Sandy Devereaux St. Clair			Recurring
Breeda Wool	Denise			Recurring
Kevin Cahoon	Bobby Barnes			Recurring
Toby Huss	J.J. 'Tex' McCready			Recurring

== Main characters ==
=== Ruth Wilder ===
Ruth Wilder (Alison Brie) is an actress struggling to land a role on film or television. Originally from Omaha, Nebraska, Ruth's love of acting began in her hometown, and she honed her skills at the Blue Barn Theatre. Having studied the works of August Strindberg, Ruth relies heavily on method acting.

Her Protestant grandfather died of hypertension when Ruth was 10. This affected her profoundly as she dressed up as Anne of Green Gables for a year afterward. One day, she is given an invitation for an audition, which turns out to be for the fledgling women's wrestling promotion Gorgeous Ladies of Wrestling (GLOW). Ruth initially has personality conflicts with director Sam Sylvia due to her tendency to overact in the ring. Aside from her acting style, Sam often questions her looks, unsure whether or not he finds her attractive. Making matters worse is her affair with Mark Eagan, the husband of her best friend, Debbie. Because of this, she is known by the other women as a homewrecker. Her attempts at creating a quasi-villainous wrestling persona include characters called the Homewrecker, Mint Julep, "a bitchy southern debutante type," The Aunty Christ, an "evil person" who "gives out raisins to kids on Halloween," and after her research at motel proprietor Gregory's family bris, Gittel the Orthodox Warrior. She finally creates the in-ring persona of Zoya the Destroya, a Soviet heel based on the real GLOW wrestler Colonel Ninotchka. Ruth joins Sam on venue scouting to a Mayan-themed theater after Bash fails to arrive. They bond and she gives him relationship advice about ending his relationship with Rhonda. Discovering she is pregnant the day of Sheila's roller rink birthday celebration, Ruth calls Sam for a lift to Planned Parenthood the next morning. When Bash's mother Birdie cuts off his funds, the girls attend her fundraiser under the guise of WAD: Wrestlers Against Drugs. Each girl shares a fake recovery story and Ruth uses her moment to apologize to Debbie. Her story compels Birdie to provide a venue for the show. With Sam absent for the pilot, Ruth picks up his directing role. As Zoya the Destroya, Ruth takes the win after her match. From the audience, Debbie challenges her as Liberty Belle and is named the winner; only to have Welfare Queen steal the crown from Liberty Belle. Ruth asks Debbie to go out for a celebratory drink after the show however, Debbie turns her down.

In Season 2, Ruth directs the show's opening sequence without Sam's approval, resulting in tensions between the both of them. While Ruth settles her differences with Sam, she falls victim to a drunk and cocaine-induced Debbie, who breaks her ankle during their match. The injury sidelines her for eight weeks, resulting in a heated argument between her and Debbie over past issues with each other. After the duo reconcile with each other, Ruth continues to provide story ideas for the show and also portrays a non-wrestling character Olga, the good twin sister of Zoya, in numerous skits. Ruth continues to interact with Justine and Sam outside of the ring even encouraging Justine to attend her school dance with Rosalie and Sam as chaperone. While slow dancing with Sam, Ruth pulls away from an attempted kiss and arrives at Russell's apartment to take him up on his previous dating offer. She tells Sam the news about her sleeping with his cameraman Russell when he brings up the previous night's dance. Sam has Ruth direct alongside him in the booth. He rewards her by having her win the GLOW Crown in the show's final episode.

In Season 3, Ruth feels extremely guilty for cutting a heel promo when the Space Shuttle Challenger explodes on live television, prompting her to have the rest of the Ladies observe a moment of silence backstage before their first show in Las Vegas. Sam refuses to let Ruth work on her day off and they instead have the "perfect day"; gambling, eating steak and meeting in the hot tub. Sam tells Ruth he's trying to respect their boundaries but she is making it impossible and admits he is in love with her. This brings her relationship with Russell in doubt, as she has feelings for Sam after rejecting him previously. During a camping trip, Ruth confesses to Debbie she is both "scared" and "excited" by Sam's profession of love. Debbie tells her to go after what she wants. When Sam and his daughter Justine successfully sell Justine's screenplay to a film studio, Sam invites Ruth to audition for the film. Ruth confesses her love to Sam after the audition, they kiss and leave the bar to go back to Sam's house. Wanting to be honest, he tells her the truth about the casting. She is emotionally devastated when he tells her that Justine has decided to cast someone else for the role. Ruth refuses to follow Sam home. Back at the hotel, the ladies put on a production of A Christmas Carol in the ring and exchange gifts. As they each depart for home, Debbie tells Ruth about Bash purchasing a television station and her being the president, and asking Ruth to direct a new GLOW show. Ruth declines, saying she does not want what Debbie wants, as she heads for her plane ride home to Omaha.

=== Debbie Eagan ===
Debbie Eagan (Betty Gilpin) is a former actress and Ruth's best friend. She is best known for her role as Laura Morgan in the soap opera Paradise Cove until she was fired due to her pregnancy. Her friendship with Ruth is severely strained when she discovers that Ruth had an affair with her husband Mark during and after her pregnancy, sparking a cat fight during practice that inspires Sam to cast Debbie as GLOW's leading lady. While trying to convince her to join GLOW, Sam theorizes that despite her popularity in Paradise Cove, she was being held back by the show's writers and her character was put in a coma for a whole season as punishment for improvising too many lines before she was eventually replaced by another actress. Originally oblivious to the professional wrestling business, Debbie's mindset changes when she watches a local wrestling show and sees its similarities to soap opera before having a one-night-stand with male wrestler Steel Horse. She later on realizes that wrestling is a liberating experience, as her body is not constrained by Mark or her son Randy in the ring. Debbie's in-ring persona is Liberty Belle, a patriotic Southern belle based on the real GLOW wrestlers Americana and The Southern Belles: Scarlet and Tara.

In Season 2, Debbie divorces Mark after realizing he never took her acting career seriously. When the ladies are given new contracts by K-DTV, Debbie and Mark have her contract amended to make her a producer of the show. Her new position puts a strain on her already fragile friendship with Ruth, especially when she prevents Ruth from going out on a date with cameraman Russell Barroso by making her work overtime to finish editing the show's material. After Debbie discovers that Mark is seeing someone, she finds cocaine stashed in a pack of Sam's cigarettes and snorts it, causing her to become aggressive during the main event and break Ruth's ankle. They reconcile shortly after an intense argument at the hospital.

In Season 3, once GLOW moves to the Fan-Tan Hotel & Casino in Las Vegas in 1986, Debbie spends her free time having sex with the hotel's bellboys and parking valets. She also develops friction with Bash as co-producer throughout the show's run. When GLOW is given a contract extension through the end of the year, Debbie has Randy brought to the hotel instead of having to regularly travel back and forth to visit him. She forms a relationship with middle-aged tycoon J. J. "Tex" McCready, but shortly after their six-month anniversary, she realizes that he has been only using her as a tool for his business dinners. After GLOW performs its Christmas show, Debbie has Bash secretly outbid Tex on the purchase of Orange County TV station KXN. She tries to convince Ruth to become GLOW's new director when the promotion returns to TV in 1987, but Ruth turns down the offer.

=== Cherry Bang ===
Cherry Bang (Sydelle Noel) is a former stuntwoman who becomes GLOW's head trainer. She previously worked in Sam's exploitation films in the 1970s and had a threesome with him and her husband. Prior to GLOW, Cherry had not worked with Sam since 1978 and she had been out of work since 1979, as the blaxploitation subgenre went on a decline toward the 1980s. She also suffered a miscarriage two years before joining GLOW. Cherry's in-ring persona is Junkchain, a female rapper.

In Season 2, Cherry quits GLOW for a starring role in K-DTV's new female detective series Chambers and Gold, but she struggles with remembering her lines and emoting in front of the camera. This results in director Rick Hollander cutting her lines and forcing her to change her hair. It is also inferred that the white director and hair/make up team do not know what to do with her Black hair. After analyzing footage of the pilot episode, Sam deduces that Cherry's background in stunt work never prepared her for acting, and at Cherry's request to help her save face in exiting the production before being fired, he talks K-DTV producer Glen Klitnick to release her from the show so she can return to GLOW. After losing her Junkchain gimmick to Yolanda Rivas in her return match, Cherry reinvents herself as Black Magic, a voodoo practitioner loosely based on the real GLOW wrestler Big Bad Mama.

In Season 3, Cherry develops doubts about raising a family after a Vegas showgirl dance trainer named Diane tells her why she left the showgirl business. This results in a heated argument with Keith, who walks out on her and returns to L.A. She racks up $5,000 in casino debt and ends up mud wrestling with Carmen in order to make the difference. For the Christmas show, Carmen reveals she is Cherry's Secret Santa and arranges to have Keith show up as Santa Claus during the show. He has looked into adoption while in L.A. and the two happily reunite.

=== Carmen Wade ===
Carmen Wade (Britney Young) is a 25-year-old woman who is part of a professional wrestling family. Her father, legendary wrestler Goliath Jackson, disapproves of her desire to become a wrestler, as he sees women's wrestling as a cheap sideshow. Carmen's in-ring persona is Machu Picchu, a gentle Peruvian giant loosely based on the real GLOW wrestler Mount Fiji. She assists Cherry in training the ladies, teaching them moves and skills and about wrestling culture. Against her better judgment, Carmen is convinced to steal the "lumberjack chop", one of her professional wrestling brother Kurt's signature wrestling moves, for GLOW fight choreography. Kurt and her other brother Tom show up before their pilot in the season 1 finale and demand justice. This takes the form of a brief cameo fight with Liberty Belle, Machu Picchu, and She-Wolf, as well as Carmen wearing a T-shirt during that fight that says "The Lumberjacks are my favorite wrestlers" on one side and "I peed the bed til I was 10."

Carmen suffers from stage fright and is the show's ingenue. She gradually outgrows her stage fright during season 1 and we see her continue to grow out of her shell as the series progresses, enjoying dancing at a gay club and partying with the GLOW girls. Carmen develops close relationships with Rhonda and Bash. She is hurt when the two marry and their friendship suffers. Bash later asks Carmen to tend to a bed-ridden Rhonda and Carmen tells him he has to be her caregiver as he is Rhonda's husband. She has fun during the “freaky Tuesday” match watching everyone's character switch. Carmen informs the others she can play Black Magic and as she explains to Melrose she is multiracial (white, Black, and Cherokee). She helps Cherry in doing her mud wrestling gig to help pay off her gambling debt. Carmen also asks Keith to return as her secret Santa gift for Cherry.

Carmen engages in some soul searching about what is best for her after Kurt visits and offers her a job in his wrestling league because he is impressed with what she's done. She tells Debbie and Ruth at the airport she will not be returning and will wrestle with her brother, Kurt, in the new year. She does not tell the others that she didn't want to ruin Christmas.

=== Sam Sylvia ===
Sam Francis Sylvia (Marc Maron) is a Sicilian American exploitation film director hired to direct GLOW. He is loosely based on Matt Cimber, the director of the original GLOW series. Sam had directed eight films in the 1970s and claims that two of them are taught in colleges. In addition, his film Gina the Machina was deemed so controversial that it was banned in 49 states. Sam has a chronic drug and alcohol addiction that has led to one divorce and multiple affairs with other women; his habits continue in GLOW when he has an affair with wrestler Rhonda Richardson. He often has conflicts with GLOW's producer Sebastian "Bash" Howard over the creative direction of the promotion, with Sam going for a dystopian sci-fi theme and Bash incorporating colorful stereotypes. Sam develops a closer relationship with Ruth over the planning process.

In Season 2, Sam becomes paranoid over his role as director when he learns that Bash talked K-DTV out of replacing him with another director named Rick Hollander. This is exacerbated when he discovers that Ruth directed the show's main title sequence without his approval. After firing Reggie Walsh for defending Ruth, Sam punishes Ruth by keeping her off the next episode's taping. He subsequently settles his difference with Ruth, admitting to his insecurity. She admits to Sam that the network executive, Tom Grant, tried to sleep with her against consent and she thinks that's the reason behind the show's new 2:00 a.m. time slot. Sam defends Ruth, noting Grant is an "asshole" and later destroys the windshield of Grant's car. Sam has growing feelings for Ruth and trusts her judgment. He is jealous of Russell when he "rescues" Ruth from the wrestling match which resulted in her broken leg. Sam insists on staying with Ruth in the hospital and tells her he does not want to do the show without her and she is not replaceable. He has her to stay for family dinner and asks her to help navigate custody with Rosalie. He slow dances with Ruth and they almost kiss before she panics and leaves. Sam addresses this the following day in an attempt to explain their connection to one another. He lets Ruth know Rosalie took Justine back to Sacramento. During the GLOW championship tournament, Sam has Ruth do a zip line entry on stage to win the crown after previously not allowing her to wrestle while in her cast. He makes Glenn admit to the girls that the station owns their characters and therefore they can no accept other offers. During Justine's prom, Sam meets Ray, a strip club owner, who later offers the ladies a show in Vegas.

In Season 3, Sam takes over the refereeing position after Keith Bang leaves Las Vegas following a falling out with his wife Cherry. He finally admits to Ruth he is in love with her while she rejects his advances. Sam believes Ruth is afraid of her true feelings and is hiding behind his age and past misdeeds. When Bash signs an extension for GLOW to continue playing in Vegas until the end of 1986, Sam quits and returns to L.A. to help his daughter Justine sell her screenplay. He has a heart attack however he does not tell Justine or Ruth about it. He wants to offer a part to Ruth however Justine insists on having her do a screen test. Sam thinks she's perfect for the part however Justine and the casting director go with someone named Angela. He meets Ruth after the audition and the two agree to not discuss their profession life. Ruth admits she is in love with Sam and he wonders when this happened. He kisses her and the two head back to his house. While waiting for the valet, Sam is truthful about the audition outcome and even though he is the director, Justine is his daughter and the screenwriter and he wants to respect her wishes. Ruth refuses his offer to go home and talk about it. He goes home without Ruth. Later, from Christmas, he gives Justine adoption papers to ensure her inheritance.

=== Justine Biagi ===
Justine Victoria Biagi (Britt Baron) is a 17-year-old punk rock girl who uses the in-ring name Scab. On the first day of auditions, she claims to be 19 years old. She is a fan of Sam's exploitation films and has a romantic relationship with pizza boy Billy Offal. Later in the series, Justine reveals herself to be Sam's illegitimate daughter, as he had a one-night-stand with her mother Rosalie after being kicked out of a Black Panther Party rally in Sacramento nearly two decades ago. Her sole purpose of joining GLOW was to meet him.

In Season 2, Justine no longer participates in GLOW as a wrestler; instead, she plays small parts in the show as a teenage girl named Lisa. She also goes back to school at the insistence of Sam. One day, Rosalie spots her on an episode of the show and storms in Sam's house to bring her back to Sacramento. After being allowed to attend the school dance, Justine is talked out of moving out to New York with Billy and decides to go home with her mother.

In Season 3, Justine pays Sam a visit and gives him her own screenplay. After Sam quits from GLOW, he helps Justine sell her screenplay to a film company and invites Ruth to audition for the film, but Justine ultimately decides to cast someone else for the role. She is pleased when Sam formally adopts her.

=== Rhonda Richardson ===
Rhonda Richardson (Kate Nash) is a British model who takes the in-ring persona of Britannica, an English genius inspired by the real GLOW wrestlers Zelda the Brain and Godiva. Prior to joining GLOW, she was homeless, living in a car and asking men for money in Santa Monica. Rhonda becomes romantically involved with Sam, but he becomes concerned when she makes their affair obvious in front of the other ladies.

In Season 2, Rhonda adds a male store window mannequin named Thomas as part of her Britannica persona; in the GLOW storyline, Britannica is working on bringing Thomas to life using her knowledge of science. When GLOW faces cancellation due to its new time slot, Rhonda reveals that she has been working without a social security number, which poses a problem for her as the ladies prepare for job openings. Not wanting to return to her drunk and abusive parents in Bromley, she takes Jenny's advice and visits the British Consulate to secure a work visa, but her request is denied and she is marked as an illegal alien. Carmen proposes for Rhonda to marry her fan Cupcake so she can secure a green card. The wedding is the focus of GLOW's final episode on K-DTV, but it falls through when Bash objects the marriage and confesses his love for Rhonda before marrying her.

In Season 3, Rhonda reveals to Bash's mother Birdie that she came to the U.S. as a Duran Duran groupie and stayed in L.A. after the band's tour there. Despite her lower middle class upbringing, she gains the respect of Birdie. Concerned with Bash not wanting to have sex with her for several months, she hires the local gigolo Paul to insinuate that the two of them are having an affair. This however, ends up becoming a threesome, with Bash later confessing he enjoyed having sex with Paul.

=== Sheila the She-Wolf ===
Sheila the She-Wolf (Gayle Rankin) is an asocial woman who wears heavy black eye makeup and has a savage personality. She claims to have an acute sense of smell and hearing, hence being a light sleeper. She also says that she is spiritually a wolf and has been using her persona for at least five years. Sheila actually has blond hair underneath her thick black wig, but she refuses to break kayfabe even in everyday life. Aside from wrestling, Sheila is in charge of audio production. She can play the keyboard, but is limited to "Theme of Exodus".

In Season 2, Sheila is shown to have more skills outside the wrestling business. She becomes a typist for Ruth and Debbie, who have no experience in using a typewriter. At the same time, she becomes concerned about her new popularity upon seeing dozens of fans dressed like her.

In Season 3, Sheila tries her hand at acting in Las Vegas, but walks out of the acting school due to a personality conflict with the teacher. She bonds with drag artist Bobby Barnes after Bash rejects his offer to star in GLOW. While the ladies go on a hiking trip at Red Rock Canyon, Sheila sees a white wolf on a hill before passing out from dehydration. That night, she rediscovers herself and sheds her She-Wolf persona by throwing her wig and outfit in the campfire.

=== Tammé Dawson ===
Tammé Dawson (Kia Stevens) is a Black woman who takes the in-ring persona of The Welfare Queen, a wrestler who flaunts her wealth from America's welfare policies. During the match in the season 1 finale, she makes social commentary on anti-Blackness in America by referencing Ronald Reagan's and says, "America, you have turned your back on me long enough! You've ghettoized my people, trapped us in an endless cycle of poverty. Not anymore. Tonight, I take back what I deserve!" She is initially concerned with her gimmick, as her son Ernest is studying at Stanford University. Prior to joining GLOW, Tammé worked as an extra in several TV shows such as Knots Landing and Gimme a Break! and as an audience coordinator for some game shows such as Family Feud.

In Season 2, Tammé pays Ernest a visit for parents' weekend. When Ernest hears that she is in GLOW, he goes with her to L.A. to attend the next taping, where she defends the GLOW crown against Debbie. Tammé loses to Debbie and is further humiliated when Debbie gives her an apron and a broom, causing her to walk out of the ring in disgust while the crowd boos Debbie. Later on she talks to Ernest, who admits he found the portrayal offensive but the sight of his mother wrestling and "throwing that white girl" empowering, and Tammé is able to make peace with her son watching GLOW.

In Season 3, the constant shows in Las Vegas take their toll on Tammé's back to the point she can no longer wrestle. Welfare Queen becomes a manager in the ring, which involves no wrestling, but a lot of personality and showmanship.

=== Melanie Rosen ===
Melanie Danielle "Melrose" Rosen (Jackie Tohn) is a "party girl" and chauffeur who worked as an extra in several films and music videos. She initially is at odds with Cherry Bang, who sees through her as an attention-starved Jewish-American princess who has never had a real job. Melrose introduces herself as "Melanie Rose," even though her real last name is Rosen. Her parents pay for her health insurance. Her in-ring personality is based on the real GLOW wrestler Hollywood.

In Season 2, Melrose gives up her prized jacket to Jenny for curing her constipation. This leads to a rivalry between the two after Jenny uses the jacket to score with GLOW cameraman Phil at a pool party.

In Season 3, Melrose has a one-night-stand with a man named Paul, who reveals himself to be a gigolo and gets into a heated argument with her when she refuses to pay for his services. Several months later, she dates Paul and pays him on her own terms. At a camp retreat with the girls, she shares that her Aunt Pestel and her eight children were murdered in the Holocaust.

=== Bash Howard ===
Sebastian "Bash" Howard (Chris Lowell) is the heir to the Howard Foods business empire and producer of GLOW, as well as the promotion's ring announcer and commentator. He provides the ladies with an old boxing gym for them to train and The Dusty Spur motel as their sleeping quarters. Bash also coordinates with K-DTV for broadcast rights and Patio Town for sponsorship. However, he is in a bind when his mother Birdie freezes his assets after having spent over $600,000 on GLOW. Bash is loosely based on GLOW creator David McLane and his dealings with financier/owner Meshulam Riklis.

In Season 2, Bash has the boxing gym converted into the official GLOW arena, but is once again strapped for cash due to Birdie funding him on a bi-monthly basis. Because of this, his butler Florian walks out on him due to a bounced check. When K-DTV relegates the show to a 2:00 a.m. time slot, Bash and Debbie go to a TV network convention and persuade several network producers to attend the final episode's taping in hopes for at least one of them to buy the show's rights. However, he is devastated upon hearing that Florian has died. While coping with his friend's death, Bash marries Rhonda on the show's final episode to help her secure a green card.

== Recurring characters ==
=== Dawn and Stacey ===
Dawn Rivecca (Rebekka Johnson) and Stacey Beswick (Kimmy Gatewood) are hairstylists who pull practical jokes on the other GLOW women. Their in-ring personas are Edna and Ethel Rosenblatt: The Beatdown Biddies - a geriatric tag team based on the real GLOW wrestlers The Housewives: Arlene and Phyllis. In GLOW's first show, Dawn and Stacey are put on a bind when they are scheduled to face Cherry and Tammé, as two black women beating up two elderly white women looks bad on all sides. As a compromise, The Beatdown Biddies wear Ku Klux Klan outfits (somewhat inspired by original GLOW characters The Hicks: Sara and Mabel) to completely put the match in favor of their opponents. Aside from wrestling, Dawn and Stacey are in charge of the wrestlers' hair and make-up.

In Season 2, Dawn and Stacey evolve their characters into The Toxic Twins: Nuke and Ozone, based on The Housewives' other persona The Heavy Metal Sisters: Chainsaw and Spike. They revert to The Beatdown Biddies in Season 3, when GLOW moves to Las Vegas.

=== Arthie Premkumar ===
Arthie Premkumar (Sunita Mani) is an Indian-American pre-med student who takes the in-ring persona of Beirut the Mad Bomber, a Middle Eastern terrorist based on the real GLOW wrestler Palestina. She is also the backstage medic for the wrestlers. During her match with Rhonda in GLOW's first season final episode, Arthie's gimmick is met with extreme hostility from some male fans, who spit at her and yell racist insults at her. One fan throws a beer can at her, but she blocks it and hits Rhonda in the head. While tending to Rhonda's head wound backstage, Arthie shows concern about the fan reaction to her gimmick.

In Season 2, Arthie plans to kill off her Beirut gimmick and introduce a new persona, but her idea is stolen by Dawn and Stacey, causing a rift between them. Arthie also reveals that she failed med school, but she is more committed to GLOW than ever before. In addition, she slowly becomes attracted to newcomer Yolanda Rivas. In season 3, Arthie and Yolanda become a couple. At the same time, Arthie struggles with her sexuality, but eventually comes out as a lesbian.

=== Reggie Walsh ===
Reggie Walsh (Marianna Palka) is an Olympic medalist. She is originally given the "Liberty Belle" gimmick in the persona test, but because of a lack of personality, the gimmick is given to Debbie instead, and Reggie becomes Vicky the Viking due to her tall, athletic stature and blond hair. Her in-ring persona is loosely based on the real GLOW wrestler Brunhilda.

In Season 2, Reggie is fired by Sam after defending Ruth over her decision to direct GLOW's title sequence and the show's pilot episode. When GLOW is relegated to a 2:00 a.m. time slot, Reggie is rehired by Sam to help complete the season.

=== Jenny Chey ===
Jenny Chey (Ellen Wong) is a Cambodian-American woman who takes the in-ring persona of Fortune Cookie, a stereotypical Chinese martial artist. Aside from wrestling, Jenny is in charge of the wrestlers' costumes.

In Season 2, Jenny helps Melrose with her constipation in exchange for her jacket. This results in some animosity between the two when new crew member Phil notices Jenny wearing the jacket and makes out with her. This animosity further worsens in Season 3, when Jenny is offended by Melrose's version of her Fortune Cookie persona in the show's Freaky Tuesday special. Jenny also reveals in Season 3 that she was a survivor of the Khmer Rouge's Cambodian Genocide, where the rest of her family who remained behind more than likely died in the Killing Fields.

=== Mark Eagan ===
Mark Eagan (Rich Sommer) is Debbie's husband. He had encouraged Debbie to leave Paradise Cove to be happy and raise a family; however, during Debbie's pregnancy, he had a sexual affair with Ruth after they both got drunk at a party. After Debbie learns of his infidelity, Mark makes several attempts to mend their marriage. However, Debbie realizes that he has never taken her career seriously ever since her Paradise Cove days.

In Season 2, Mark moves out of Debbie's house after she divorces him. They share joint custody of their son Randy. In Season 3, Mark tells Debbie that Randy made his first baby steps shortly after she flew back to Vegas.

=== Mallory ===
Mallory (Amy Farrington) is a casting director who purposefully brings in Ruth to casting calls to show directors who not to cast in their projects. Seeing that Ruth is desperate for a break, Mallory leaves a message on her answering machine about a potential opportunity with GLOW. She also threatens to have Ruth blacklisted from all casting calls if she continues to stalk her in the office restroom. Later in the series, Mallory calls Cherry to inform her that K-DTV has invited her to audition for a TV drama titled Chambers and Gold.

=== Keith Bang ===
Keith Bang (Bashir Salahuddin) is Cherry's husband and the GLOW referee. Like Cherry, Keith previously worked with Sam on his exploitation films in the 1970s. In Season 3, Keith walks out on Cherry and leaves Las Vegas after a heated argument over planning a family. He returns during GLOW's Christmas show dressed as Santa Claus and reconciles with Cherry, proposing to adopt a child to take the emotional weight off Cherry.

=== Florian Becker ===
Florian Becker (Alex Rich) is Bash's butler. He and Bash have known each other since the third grade. Florian participates in GLOW's pilot episode to present the GLOW Crown. He makes a cameo in the first episode of Season 2, but does not reappear due to a falling out with Bash over a bounced check. Florian is later revealed to be gay and passes away from pneumonia, caused by AIDS. His mother, Eileen Becker, lives in Encino according to Bash.

=== Glen Klitnick ===
Glen Klitnick (Andrew Friedman) is an executive for North Hollywood-based K-DTV who picks up the broadcast rights of GLOW. On the night of GLOW's pilot episode taping, Glen tells Cherry that she won the audition for Chambers and Gold, but she must quit GLOW if she wants to take the part. When it is evident that Cherry does not have any acting experience, Glen has the show reworked into Good as Gold while Cherry returns to GLOW. Following GLOW's final TV episode, Glen informs everyone that K-DTV owns the exclusive television rights to GLOW's characters, preventing other networks from purchasing the show.

=== Billy Offal ===
Billy Offal (Casey Johnson) is a pizza delivery boy who develops a relationship with Justine. He and Justine have very differing opinions on Sam Sylvia's films, as he considers him to be a hack. In Season 2, Billy is the lead vocalist of the punk rock band Shitpope, with Justine printing t-shirts for them. Seeing that Justine has issues with Sam and Rosalie, Billy tells her to move with him to New York, where he plans to continue his band's career. Eventually, Justine breaks up with him and decides to move back with her mother to Sacramento.

=== Goliath Jackson ===
Goliath Jackson (Winston James Francis) is a veteran wrestler and Carmen's father. He is against Carmen pursuing a career in GLOW, as he wants her to get married and be a good housewife instead, but comes around to the idea by GLOW's pilot airing when he influences the crowd to cheer for her.

=== Big Kurt Jackson and Mighty Tom Jackson ===
Big Kurt Jackson (Carlos Edwin) and Mighty Tom Jackson (Tyrus) are Carmen's elder brothers. They are known in the wrestling business as the tag team "The Lumberjacksons". At the insistence of Carmen, the duo train Ruth and Debbie for their main event. In the Season 2 finale, Big Kurt angrily confronts Carmen when she trains the wrestlers to use one of his moves on the TV show, but is talked down by Debbie and convinced to help out for the show's final episode.

In Season 3, Big Kurt pays Carmen a visit and suggests for her to move to Arizona with the rest of the family.

=== Patrick O'Towne ===
Patrick O'Towne (Andy Umberger) is the CEO of Patio Town, an indoor/outdoor lifestyle store chain. He initially declines to sponsor GLOW due to his lack of interest, but Sam convinces him to reconsider when Ruth cuts a promo as Zoya the Destroya during the ribbon-cutting ceremony of Patio Town's new Calabasas branch.

In Season 2, Patio Town withdraws its sponsorship of GLOW after Tammé hits Debbie with a breakable chair that is implied to be one of the store's products. Furthermore, Patrick is said to have been offended by the show's PSA on teenage pregnancy, as his mother was 15 when she gave birth to him.

=== Gregory ===
Gregory (Ravil Isyanov) is the cranky Russian manager of The Dusty Spur motel. When Ruth needs help in developing her Zoya the Destroya character, he takes her to a Russian Jewish family party. Fortunately, Ruth does not speak Russian and thus cannot understand what the family is saying about her.

=== Birdie Howard ===
Birdie Howard (Elizabeth Perkins) is Bash's mother. Upon discovering that Bash spent over $600,000 on investing on GLOW, she freezes his assets. After Bash brings in the GLOW wrestlers as mock speakers in Birdie's anti-drug fundraiser, Birdie allows him to use the Hayworth Hotel's ballroom for GLOW's pilot episode.

Birdie returns in Season 3 to pay Bash and Rhonda a visit in Las Vegas. After taking Rhonda out to a shopping trip, Birdie facilitates a telephone conference between Bash and the family lawyer, who reveals that Bash's marriage has unlocked the $40 million inheritance from his late grandfather.

=== Gary ===
Gary (Marc Evan Jackson) is Birdie's butler who has worked for the Howard family for eighteen years. Bash brings the women to one of Birdie's parties in order to try to raise money from the guests to reserve a venue for the pilot, but is stopped by Gary. After letting Bash tell a sob story about the women being recovering drug addicts, a clearly skeptical Gary lets them in. In Season 2, Bash meets Gary at Birdie's house after his falling out with Florian, and expresses his various issues to Gary over some soup. After revealing Florian himself had come by for help after he left Bash, Gary sympathetically offers to convince Birdie to give Bash the money to continue funding GLOW.

=== Yolanda Rivas ===
Yolanda Rivas (Shakira Barrera), also known as "Yo-Yo", is a Mexican American lesbian stripper who replaces Cherry in the role of Junkchain in Season 2. Despite having no wrestling background, she excels with her dancing skills, especially breakdancing. When Cherry returns, Yolanda defeats her to keep the Junkchain gimmick. Arthie falls in love with her after they film a segment where Beirut dreams of being a dancer and Yolanda is her male partner. They become a couple in season 3.

=== Russell Barroso ===
Russell Barroso (Victor Quinaz) is a member of the GLOW camera crew in Season 2. Prior to joining GLOW, he worked for pornography director Hal Freeman. Russell slowly develops a relationship with Ruth. When GLOW moves to Las Vegas after the show's final episode, Russell says farewell to Ruth, as he is still under contract with K-DTV. In Season 3, Russell comes to visit Ruth for weekend. She buys him an expensive camera and offers to live with him when she returns to Los Angeles. He says these behaviors are out of character as if she is trying to prove they are in a good relationship. They have an argument about her obsession with Sam but make up before he goes home. Russell informs Ruth that Menahem Golan has offered him a job as a cameraman in an upcoming movie being shot in Spain. He mentions to Ruth that his grandfather is Portuguese and still living.

=== Phil ===
Phil (Wyatt Nash) is a member of the GLOW camera crew in Season 2 who becomes romantically involved with Jenny.

=== Rick Hollander ===
Rick Hollander (Peter O'Brien) is a British director who works for K-DTV. After helming Quilting Bee Easy, the network's longest-running TV show, he is assigned to direct the female buddy cop series Chambers and Gold. The production proves disastrous due to Cherry's inexperience in acting, causing Hollander to try another narrative direction by cutting her lines and making her change her hair. Sam intervenes and convinces Glen and Hollander to release Cherry from Chambers and Gold so she can return to GLOW. Hollander also takes Sam's suggestion to rename Chambers and Gold to Good as Gold.

=== Susan ===
Susan (Phoebe Strole) is Mark's secretary in Season 2. Following their divorce, Debbie discovers that Mark has a relationship with Susan.

=== Tom Grant ===
Tom Grant (Paul Fitzgerald) is the president of K-DTV. He invites Ruth over for a meeting at his hotel room, where he sexually harasses her. When she walks out of the meeting, Grant punishes GLOW by relegating the show to a dismal 2:00 a.m. time slot and giving their original Saturday morning time slot to a men's wrestling show. Sam destroys Grant's car windshield after hearing about what he did to Ruth.

=== Rosalie Biagi ===
Rosalie Biagi (Annabella Sciorra) is Justine's mother who is concerned about her new relationship with Sam and GLOW.

=== Cupcake ===
Toby "Cupcake" Matkins (Patrick Renna) is Rhonda's biggest fan. He bakes cupcakes for her and proposes to her, but she rejects his offer. When Rhonda faces deportation for lacking a green card, she reluctantly agrees to marry Cupcake in the show's final episode. The wedding ceremony, however, is objected by Bash, who realizes that Cupcake does not really love Rhonda. When the wedding is changed to have Bash marry Rhonda, a frustrated Cupcake announces that wrestling is fake before he is kicked out of the ring.

=== Ray ===
Ray (Horatio Sanz) is the owner of a strip club chain that Yolanda used to work for. He befriends Sam during a high school dance attended by Justine. When negotiations for other networks to pick up GLOW fall through due to K-DTV owning the TV rights to the characters, Ray proposes to have the promotion moved to Las Vegas (which was the home of the original GLOW series) as a live show, claiming that GLOW has the potential to be a headliner and make at least $25,000 a week.

=== Sandy Devereaux St. Clair ===
Sandy Devereaux St. Clair (Geena Davis) is a former showgirl and the entertainment director of the Fan-Tan Hotel & Casino in Las Vegas, the new home of GLOW starting in 1986. She shows no interest in professional wrestling, but is impressed by the revenue generated by GLOW.

=== Denise ===
Denise (Breeda Wool) is a dance instructor. After Denise gives Cherry some advice on strength training, Cherry has the Ladies take a dance class with the Rhapsody showgirls. Denise reveals to Cherry that she was part of the Rhapsody cast until her pregnancy forced her out of the show.

=== Bobby Barnes ===
Bobby Barnes (Kevin Cahoon) is a drag performer who has been doing his show at the Fan-Tan for ten years. His shows feature his impersonations of Carol Channing, Barbra Streisand, and Liza Minnelli. Despite his career as a drag performer, Bobby is married with a seven-year-old son. After encountering the Ladies in one of his shows, he offers to work for Bash, but despite setting up a private show, Bash turns him down. Sheila bonds with Bobby following the show. Bobby hosts the Libertine Ball, a fundraising LGBT charity ball for AIDS awareness. A majority of the Ladies attend the 1986 Libertine Ball, which is ruined by a fire set by a homophobic gang.

=== J. J. "Tex" McCready ===
James Joseph "J. J." McCready (Toby Huss) is a middle-aged tycoon who made his fortunes from semiconductor minerals at his ranch in Wyoming. He initially meets Debbie on her flight back to Vegas. They meet again at the Fan-Tan when Randy gets lost at the casino; only this time, J. J. is clean-shaven. Debbie calls him "Tex" because she initially mistakes him for a Texan. Tex and Debbie have a relationship for six months until Debbie realizes she has been used by Tex as a tool for his business dinners. Debbie retaliates by having Bash secretly outbid Tex on the purchase of Orange County TV station KXN.

=== Paul ===
Paul (Nick Clifford) is a hotel guest who has sex with Melrose, who discovers that he is a gigolo before they argue about her not paying for his services. By the time GLOW reaches its 200th show, Melrose dates and pays Paul on her terms. When Rhonda becomes concerned about Bash, as they have not had sex for months, she borrows Paul from Melrose as a means to get Bash to notice her again. However, the planned affair becomes a threesome, with Bash telling Debbie that he likes having sex with Paul. It is implied that Sandy is Paul's pimp, as she openly acknowledges his presence at the casino.

=== Jonathan ===
Jonathan (Armen Weitzman) is the second film executive who reviews Justine's screenplay. After interviewing Justine, Jonathan informs her that his studio would like to make a film out of her work.

== Guest characters ==
- Salty "The Sack" Johnson (John Hennigan) is a professional wrestler assigned as GLOW's original trainer, but is fired by Sam due to creative differences.
- Carolyn (Esther Anderson) is Sam's ex-wife. Sam divorced her after he caught her having sex with his steadicam operator. They share joint custody of their dog Lenny.
- Lorene (Lisa Ann Walter) is Debbie's mother, who takes care of Randy while Debbie is out training for GLOW. She was a working mother who wasn't able to stay home with Debbie. She is divorced from Debbie's father. She credits Debbie's Aunt Kathy with helping her through the divorce. She married Ron.
- Ron (Allan Havey) is Debbie's stepfather.
- Dale (Alex Riley) is a professional wrestler who takes the persona of "Steel Horse", a working-class hero. As Debbie watches Dale's match, she realizes that wrestling is a soap opera in the ring. Backstage, Dale admits to Debbie that he has been a fan of hers since her days in Paradise Cove, which was one of the inspirations for the in-ring storylines. A drunk Debbie makes out with him in his dressing room before she goes back to the motel the next morning.
- Rick (Joey Ryan) is a professional wrestler who takes the persona of "Mr. Monopoly", an arrogant business tycoon who is Steel Horse's arch nemesis and half-brother. His gimmick is a parody of "The Million Dollar Man" Ted DiBiase, and he is accompanied by his valet and Steel Horse's ex-girlfriend Crystal (Laura James), a parody of Miss Elizabeth.
- Michael (Daniel Polo) is Gregory's cousin and a young Russian Jewish chess champion who migrates to America. He undergoes bris during his welcome party, and upon overhearing Ruth talking about Yentl, he asks her to sing one of Barbra Streisand's songs to ease his pain.
- Amber Fredrickson (Brooke Hogan) is the manager of a night club (which looks like the Mayan Theater) that Sam and Ruth see as a possible venue for GLOW shows.
- Regina Offal (Christine Elliott) is Billy's mother.
- Ernest Dawson (Eli Goree) is Tammé's son.
- Dan Lyon (Jake Fogelnest) is a DJ for KXQB 98.5. He interviews the ladies, who are promoting the show's final episode and Britannica's wedding.
- Priest/Judge Eric (Jonathan Mangum) is the priest who oversees the wedding ceremony of the show's final episode.
- Chico Guapo (Chavo Guerrero Jr.) is Big Kurt's friend. He and Big Kurt storm into the ladies' room to confront Carmen over stealing Big Kurt's wrestling moves. Debbie defuses the situation by having Carmen wear a humiliating shirt during the show's wedding segment. During the battle royal for the GLOW Crown, Chico and Big Kurt interrupt the match before they are thrown out by Debbie, Carmen, and Sheila.
- Bernie Rubenstein (Ray Xifo) is the director and choreographer of Rhapsody, the longest-running show at the Fan-Tan Hotel & Casino. He is invited by Sandy to watch GLOW's opening night. Bernie dies shortly before GLOW's final week at the Fan-Tan, with Sandy giving a brief eulogy to him at the hotel before offering GLOW a contract extension until the end of the year.
- Brenda (Ashley Platz) is a stewardess on Debbie's flight back to L.A. She gives Debbie an airline lapel pin for Randy, but Debbie gives it back on her flight back to Vegas.
- Jerry and Lev Zeissman (Randy and Jason Sklar, respectively) are identical twins who run their show Havana Dreams at the Coconut Hotel & Casino. Bash invites the brothers for a tennis doubles match with him and Sam as a means to network with every entertainer in Vegas. After the match, the twins are invited to one of GLOW's shows. The Zeissmans enter the Ladies' dressing room and make them uncomfortable with their showgirl jokes.
- Steve Mills (Murray SawChuck) is a waiter and magician. Upon overhearing the conversation between Debbie, Sam, and Bash over finding a referee to replace Keith, Steve offers his services to them. He is ultimately not hired due to Cherry protesting that his magic skills clash with her Black Magic persona.
- Don Silverberg (Brandon Keener) is a TriStar Pictures executive and a former friend of Sam. Despite having converted to Buddhism, Don lashes out at Sam in front of Justine over some past incidents between them, resulting in Sam and Justine walking out of the film studio.
- Patricia (BB Gandanghari) is a fortune teller who is paid a visit by Ruth, who is wondering if she has been wasting her life.
