= GLOW: The Story of the Gorgeous Ladies of Wrestling =

- Directed by: Brett Whitcomb
- Written by: Bradford Thomason
- Produced by: Jason Connell; Brett Whitcomb
- Starring: Emily Dole; Dee Booher; Angelina Altishin; Cindy Maranne; Lorilyn Palmer; Lisa Moretti; Jeanne Basone; Steve Blance; Mando Guerrero
- Cinematography: Brett Whitcomb
- Edited by: Bradford Thomason; Alex Perrault
- Music by: ESG; Bradford Thomason; Dwayne Cathey
- Production companies: Connell Creations; Window Pictures
- Release date: April 27, 2012
- Running time: 76 minutes
- Country: United States
- Language: English

GLOW: The Story of the Gorgeous Ladies of Wrestling is a documentary film about professional wrestling. Released in 2012, it tells the story of the Gorgeous Ladies of Wrestling (abbreviated G.L.O.W. or GLOW), a women's wrestling promotion. GLOW staged live events that were filmed and then shown on American television for four seasons in the late 1980s. The documentary includes footage from the TV series, combined with then-recent interviews of some of the participants.

The film was directed by Brett Whitcomb and written by Bradford Thomason. It premiered on April 27, 2012, at the Hot Docs Canadian International Documentary Festival. It won the Best Documentary award at the 2012 San Diego Comic-Con film festival. It was released on DVD in the United States on March 26, 2013. It became available for streaming on Netflix on April 1, 2017.

== Synopsis ==
Gorgeous Ladies of Wrestling was the first women's professional wrestling TV show. It was created by David McLane and directed by Matt Cimber. Mando Guerrero trained the wrestlers, most of whom were aspiring actors and models with no previous experience in professional wrestling. The production was financed by Meshulam Riklis, who at the time was the principal owner of the Riviera hotel and casino in Las Vegas and was married to Pia Zadora. As usual in professional wrestling, the women of GLOW portrayed campy, flamboyant characters who were either "good" or "bad". The TV series also included comedy sketches and rap music performed by the wrestlers. It was quite popular and ran for four seasons, from 1986 to 1989, before it was abruptly cancelled.

GLOW: The Story of the Gorgeous Ladies of Wrestling combines footage from the television series with interviews of some of the wrestlers, done about 15 years after the TV show ended. Towards the end of the movie, the women of GLOW have a reunion party in Orange County, California. Wrestlers interviewed in the film include Emily Dole (Mountain Fiji), Dee Booher (Matilda the Hun), Angelina Altishin (Little Egypt), Cindy Maranne (Americana), Lorilyn Palmer (Ninotchka), Lisa Moretti (Tina Ferrari), Jeanne Basone (Hollywood), Lynn Braxton (Big Bad Mama), Dawn Rice (Godiva), Donna Willinsky (Spike), Sharon Willinsky (Chainsaw), Cheryl Rusa (Lightning), and Ursula Hayden (Babe the Farmer's Daughter).

== Critical reception ==
In The New Yorker, Sarah Larson wrote, "If a show like [the GLOW TV series] were made today, it might be self-consciously or ostensibly feminist – a celebration of fortitude and athleticism, like roller derby or American Ninja Warrior. G.L.O.W. was aesthetically about as feminist as Charlie's Angels – yet it was empowering. It created a bizarre new realm in which women could be strong and aggressive and reveal a raw id. The G.L.O.W. alums in the documentary, though blunt about G.L.O.W.'s management and working conditions, speak about their time on the show with pride. In its own weird way, G.L.O.W. was physically and spiritually freeing."

In The Village Voice, Araceli Cruz said, "Yes, GLOW... was a groundbreaking television show that... featured female wrestlers who, we now learn, were actresses, models, dancers, and/or stunt women hoping to break into show business any way they could. But what happened to them? Director Brett Whitcomb takes us into the lives of this tough group of women in his documentary GLOW: The Story of the Gorgeous Ladies of Wrestling from the initial open-call auditions, to the grueling training with wrestling legend Mando Guerrero, to overnight success and global recognition, and the show's unexpected cancellation."

On Toronto Film Scene, William Brownridge wrote, "Although GLOW... didn't last very long on television, the fan following was immense. How could you not fall in love with something so campy and fun? With the big hair, neon colours, gorgeous ladies, and some impressive wrestling skills, the women of GLOW enjoyed huge popularity. At what was probably the height of their success, the money was pulled out of the show, forcing everything to shut down. GLOW: The Story of the Gorgeous Ladies of Wrestling takes us from the first auditions, through the final moments of the league, and finally, to a reunion that brings the girls back together after more than 15 years."

On RogerEbert.com, Jana Monji said, "Director Brett Whitcomb and writer Bradford Thomason take us back to the disco era of big hair, glitter and Spandex to look at how three men, David McLane, Matt Cimber and Steve Blance with money from Pia Zadora's then-husband Meshulam Riklis, created a TV faux-reality show and peopled it with wanna-be stars.... Clips from the original broadcasts and interviews with former members paint a picture of innocence, fun and folly, but the reunion that resulted from the making of this documentary is touching. [The filmmakers] don't ignore the downside of wrestling including on-stage and cumulative injuries."

In LA Weekly, Siran Babayan wrote, "Everything about G.L.O.W. was '80s excess: the makeup, high-cut leotards and even higher hair. For 500 matches, girls with un-P.C. and mildly offensive names like Spanish Red, Cheyenne Cher, Little Egypt and Palestina head-locked each other in staged cat fights in Vegas interspersed with cheesy comedy sketches and even worse rap songs... The film's where-are-they-now interviews are made all the more touching thanks to a cast reunion recently organized in O.C. that included the elusive [Matt] Cimber, who, by most accounts, was a temperamental taskmaster. Cimber, a movie producer who was Jayne Mansfield's last husband, declined to be interviewed for the movie."

On Decider, Josh Sorokach said, "An eclectic blend of sketch comedy, singing, and grappling, the series was heavy on variety as it combined elements of Laugh-In, MTV, Saturday Night Live, and the WWF (now referred to as the WWE) to create a wholly original viewing experience. The original GLOW is the personification of '80s camp.... Inspirational, heart-breaking, and a whole lot of fun, this riveting doc is a must-watch for fans of Netflix's newest comedy."
