= Ursula Hayden =

American professional wrestler (1966–2022)

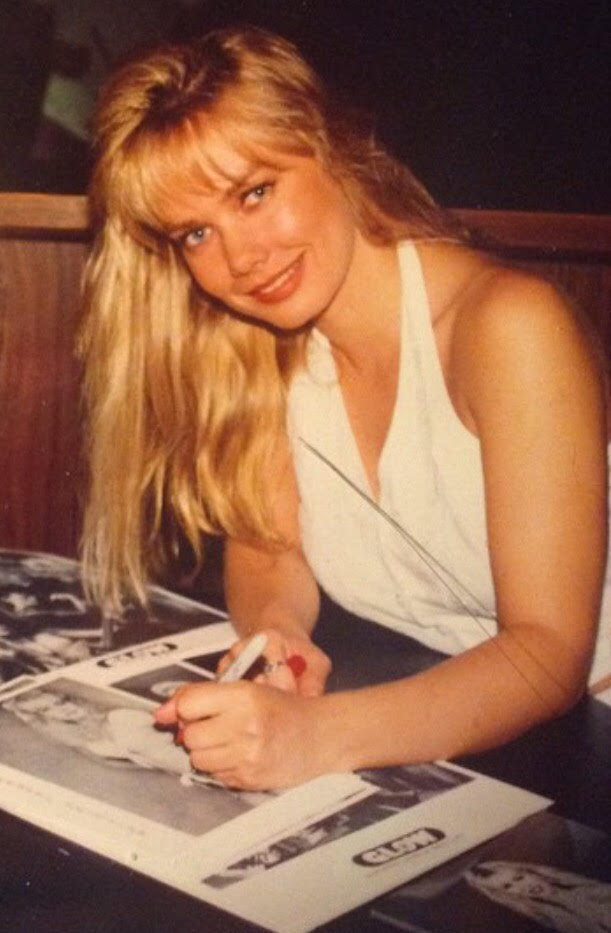
- Hayden signing autographs in 1987
- Born: Ursa Bamby Hayden; March 8, 1966; Santa Monica, California, U.S.
- Died: December 3, 2022 (aged 56)
- Occupations: Professional wrestler, actress, businesswoman
- Years active: 1986–2022
- Known for: Owner of Gorgeous Ladies of Wrestling (GLOW)
- Children: 1
- Family: Hayden
- Professional wrestling career
- Ring name(s): Babe the Farmer's Daughter; Donna Matrix; Goldie Ray; Princess of Darkness; Ursula Hayden
- Trained by: Mando Guerrero
- Debut: 1986
- Retired: 2011
- Website: GLOW official

Ursula Hayden (born Ursa Bamby Hayden; March 8, 1966 – December 3, 2022) was an American professional wrestler, actress, and businesswoman. She was best known for her character Babe the Farmer's Daughter on the 1980s television show Gorgeous Ladies of Wrestling (also known as GLOW), and being the owner of the GLOW company from 2001 until her death. She was also a consultant on the Netflix original web series GLOW.

== Early life ==
Ursa Bamby Hayden was born in Santa Monica, California, on March 8, 1966, and grew up in Los Angeles, California, where she was involved in gymnastics from a very young age.

== Career ==
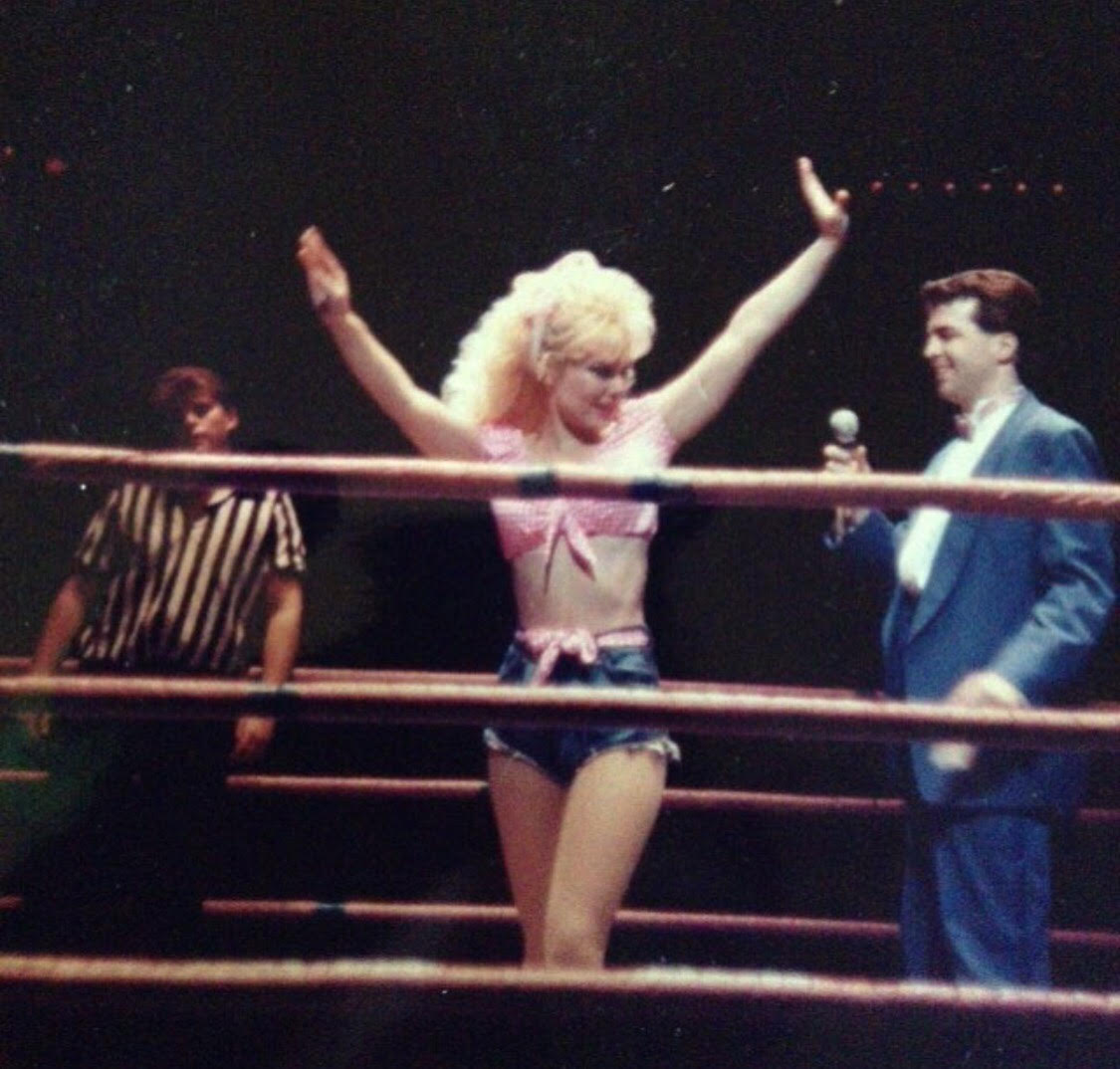
Hayden winning a "Gorgeous Ladies of Wrestling" match in 1987.

During the 1970s and early 1980s, Hayden did modeling jobs for various companies such as Sirkka T Fashion and Beno's Department Store. When Hayden was 17 years old, she entered into Southern California's Miss Perfect Teen Pageant and won first place.

In 1986, Hayden started her professional wrestling career on the hit television show that was known for its colorful characters, strong women, and over-the-top comedy sketches, Gorgeous Ladies of Wrestling. She wrestled under the ring names "Babe the Farmer's Daughter", "The Princess of Darkness", and "Donna Matrix". In 1987, Hayden worked on a Faberge shampoo commercial while also being in her character Babe the Farmer's Daughter. She then continued her wrestling career by joining Powerful Women of Wrestling and portrayed the character Goldie Ray.

Hayden then went on to guest-star in television shows such as Hard Time on Planet Earth (1989), Married... with Children (1990), and Family Feud (1992).

Hayden purchased the Gorgeous Ladies of Wrestling (GLOW) company from Meshulam Riklis in 2001. Once taking over ownership, Hayden oversaw the restoration of archived GLOW episodes for viewing on the official company website. She then worked on her first wrestling adventure which was a sold out (2003) live event at the El Rey Theater in Los Angeles, California. After great reviews with the event, she put together another one that reunited original GLOW wrestlers in Las Vegas, Nevada. Then in 2012, Hayden worked on the documentary titled GLOW: The Story of the Gorgeous Ladies of Wrestling, which won the Best Documentary award at the 2012 San Diego Comic-Con film festival. The documentary was later released on DVD in the United States and then became available for streaming on Netflix April 1, 2017.

She wrestled three matches in June and July 2011 in Edmonton, Alberta, in the independent circuit.

Hayden then started working with writers Liz Flahive and Carly Mensch in 2014, on creating a new GLOW Gorgeous Ladies of Wrestling television show. In 2016 Netflix picked up the pilot for a full season and Hayden served as a series consultant on GLOW which was released June 23, 2017. She was then featured in articles such as The Washington Post, Inverse, Sports Illustrated, and the LA Times.

In 2018, Hayden returned to television on The Bachelor with fellow original Gorgeous Ladies of Wrestling cast member Angelina Altishin (‘Little Egypt’), to train eight women how to wrestle and put on a live wrestling match. Each of the women were assigned their own wrestling personality, using wildly imaginative costumes and makeup. However, a few of the bachelorettes were upset by the aggressive nature of Ursula and Angelina’s wrestling personas.

== Personal life and death ==
Hayden died from cancer on December 3, 2022, at the age of 56.

== Filmography ==
Television

| Year | Title | Role |
|---|---|---|
| 1986–1990 | GLOW: Gorgeous Ladies of Wrestling | Babe the Farmer's Daughter |
| 1987 | POWW: Powerful Women of Wrestling | Goldie Ray |
| 1989 | Hard Time on Planet Earth | Babe the Farmer's Daughter (episode "The Hot Dog Man") |
| 1990 | Married... with Children | Babe the Farmer's Daughter (episode "You Gotta Know When to Fold Them") |
| 2017 | GLOW (Netflix series) | series consultant |
| 2018 | The Bachelor | herself |

Films

| Year | Title | Role |
|---|---|---|
| 2012 | GLOW: The Story of the Gorgeous Ladies of Wrestling | herself |
