= Ivory (wrestler) =

American professional wrestler (born 1961)

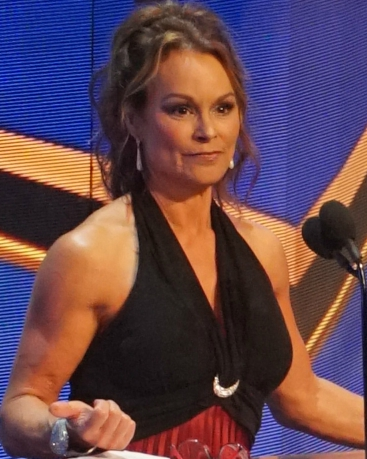
- Ivory in 2018

Personal information
- Born: Lisa Mary Moretti; November 26, 1961 (age 64) Los Angeles, California, U.S.
- Education: University of Southern California

Professional wrestling career
- Ring name(s): Ivory; Lisa Moretti; Nina; Tina Ferrari; Tina Moretti
- Billed height: 5 ft 5 in (1.65 m)
- Billed weight: 135 lb (61 kg)
- Billed from: Seattle, Washington
- Trained by: Mando Guerrero
- Debut: 1986
- Retired: 2006

Signature
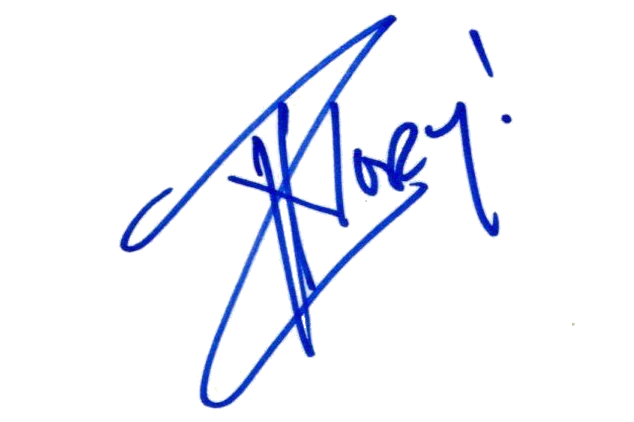

Lisa Mary Moretti (born November 26, 1961) is an American retired professional wrestler, teacher and coach. She is best known for her tenure in WWE, where she is a three-time WWE Women's Champion - twice in 1999 and once in 2000 - and she was inducted into the WWE Hall of Fame in 2018.

Moretti began her career and first found national exposure in the independent promotion Gorgeous Ladies of Wrestling, where she performed as Tina Ferrari from the mid-to-late-1980s. Moretti debuted in WWE in 1999 as the manager for D'Lo Brown & Mark Henry. She won the Women's Championship twice, before becoming a part of the villainous Right to Censor, a storyline stable of characters with harshly conservative sociopolitical views. This led to her third Women's Championship victory.

In her later years with WWE, she wrestled only sporadically. Moretti co-hosted WWE Experience and served as one of the trainers on WWE Tough Enough. After she left WWE in 2005, she wrestled for Women Superstars Uncensored, winning two other titles, and was also inducted into the WSU Hall of Fame. Moretti also began volunteering at her local animal shelter, and in 2007 opened an animal care and grooming facility named Downtown Dog in her hometown.

== Professional wrestling career ==
=== Early years (1986–1994) ===
In her youth, Moretti wrestled with her two brothers and sister. Later, while attending the University of Southern California (USC), Moretti was, in her own words, "dragged by a friend" (later confirmed to be Nadine Kadmiri) to an audition held by the newly formed Las Vegas, Nevada-based Gorgeous Ladies of Wrestling (GLOW). She and Kadmiri were both successful in their audition and went on to train under Mando Guerrero for six weeks, before beginning to wrestle in GLOW under the ring names Tina Ferrari and Ashley Cartier respectively, also forming a tag team known as T & A. Ferrari defeated Colonel Ninotchka to win the vacant GLOW Championship, which was represented by a crown.

Moretti later wrestled for the Powerful Women of Wrestling promotion and the Ladies Professional Wrestling Association under the ring names Nina and Tina Moretti, winning the POWW Championship.

On September 23, 1994, at UWF's Blackjack Brawl, Moretti, under the name Tina Moretti, wrestled against Candi Devine for the vacant UWF World Women's Championship in a losing effort. After UWF, Moretti took a hiatus from wrestling and was not seen in the public eye for five years.

=== World Wrestling Federation/Entertainment (1999–2005) ===
==== Women's Champion (1999–2000) ====
In January 1999, after several years of absence, Moretti returned to wrestling, signing a contract with the World Wrestling Federation (WWF). Her first appearance in WWF was accompanying The Godfather, a "pimp" character who was accompanied by various women dubbed the "hos", to the ring. On the February 13, 1999 episode of Raw, however, Moretti was introduced as Ivory, the storyline love interest of Mark Henry. Ivory acted as the fan favorite valet for the tag team of Mark Henry and D'Lo Brown, and made her televised WWF in-ring debut on the February 15 episode of Raw, teaming with Brown to face Jeff Jarrett and Debra in an intergender tag team match that ended in a no contest. Ivory faced Debra in a singles match on the March 1 episode of Raw, defeating Debra by disqualification after she was attacked by the Pretty Mean Sisters (Jacqueline Moore and Terri Runnels). At WrestleMania XV on March 28, Ivory accompanied D'Lo Brown and Test to the ring for their WWF Tag Team Championship title match against Jarrett and Owen Hart. Jarrett and Hart retained their titles following interference from Moore, Runnels, and Debra.

During this time, the women in the WWF were known more for their physical appearances and "sex appeal" rather than their wrestling abilities, and featuring women in strip matches or farcical "slop matches", a match that takes place in a pool of slop, were common. Ivory, who was a trained wrestler, entered into a brief feud with Sable, the current title holder, who subsequently dropped the title to Debra. Ivory finally won the Women's Championship on June 14, by defeating Debra and went on to defend her title against Tori at SummerSlam on August 22. Ivory turned heel during her feud with Tori, which continued in the weeks following SummerSlam, defeating Tori in the first ever WWF women's hardcore match on September 6. Ivory was then challenged by Luna Vachon, who Ivory defeated in a farcical hardcore match at Unforgiven on September 26. SLAM! Wrestling called the match "pointless and senseless". In October 1999, Ivory feuded with The Fabulous Moolah, who defeated her for the Women's Championship on October 17, 1999, at No Mercy, in what John Powell of SLAM! Wrestling called the "worst match I've ever seen". She, however, defeated Moolah in a rematch on the October 25 episode of Raw to win her second Women's Championship. Her second title reign ended with a loss to Miss Kitty, an un-trained wrestler, in a Four Corners Evening Gown pool match, a match where a wrestler wins by stripping the evening gown off of her opponents, on December 12 at Armageddon.

In late 1999, Ivory began portraying a more conservative character. On January 23, 2000, at the Royal Rumble, she grudgingly took part in the "Miss Royal Rumble" swimsuit contest, which was won by Mae Young. She challenged Jacqueline for the WWF Women's Championship on March 9, but she was unsuccessful. A few weeks later on an episode of Smackdown, she became the first woman to attempt to win the WWF Hardcore Championship, after unsuccessfully trying to pin Crash Holly backstage.

==== Right to Censor (2000–2001) ====
Following a period of absence, Ivory returned to WWF television in October 2000 as a member of a villainous alliance of conservative wrestlers known as Right to Censor. The change in character saw her don less suggestive ring attire and more conservative hairstyles. Group leader Stevie Richards would later state on his podcast that unlike the other Right to Censor members (notably The Goodfather) who privately hated being in the group, Ivory legitimately felt the way the group felt on scantily clad women and that the focus needed to be on in-ring skills. Richards also said that Ivory could have easily supplanted himself as the leader with how well she performed in the role, adding that it "was her best role in WWE".

Ivory quickly began a rivalry with Women's Champion Lita, winning the Women's Championship for the third time by defeating Lita, Jacqueline, and Trish Stratus in a Fatal Four-Way match. She retained the title against Lita at the Survivor Series on November 19, with the assistance of Right to Censor leader Steven Richards, in a match that SLAM! Wrestling claimed "illustrated to what heights women's wrestling is capable of reaching in North America if the right talent is permitted to strut their stuff in a wrestling ring and not a pit full of jello." Ivory also retained her title in a Triple Threat match against Stratus and Molly Holly at Armageddon on December 10.

Ivory and the Right to Censor began feuding with Chyna after the latter posed for Playboy in late 2000. On the December 7 episode of Raw, Ivory and Val Venis delivered a double-team piledriver to Chyna which, in storyline, injured her neck. Chyna challenged Ivory for the Women's Championship at the Royal Rumble on January 21, 2001. Ivory retained her title when she pinned Chyna, who had appeared to re-aggravate her neck injury. Chyna challenged Ivory for the title once more at WrestleMania X-Seven on April 1 and defeated Ivory in a brief match, ending Ivory's third reign as Women's Champion. The Right to Censor stable was finally disbanded on April 26, 2001.

==== Various storylines (2001–2005) ====
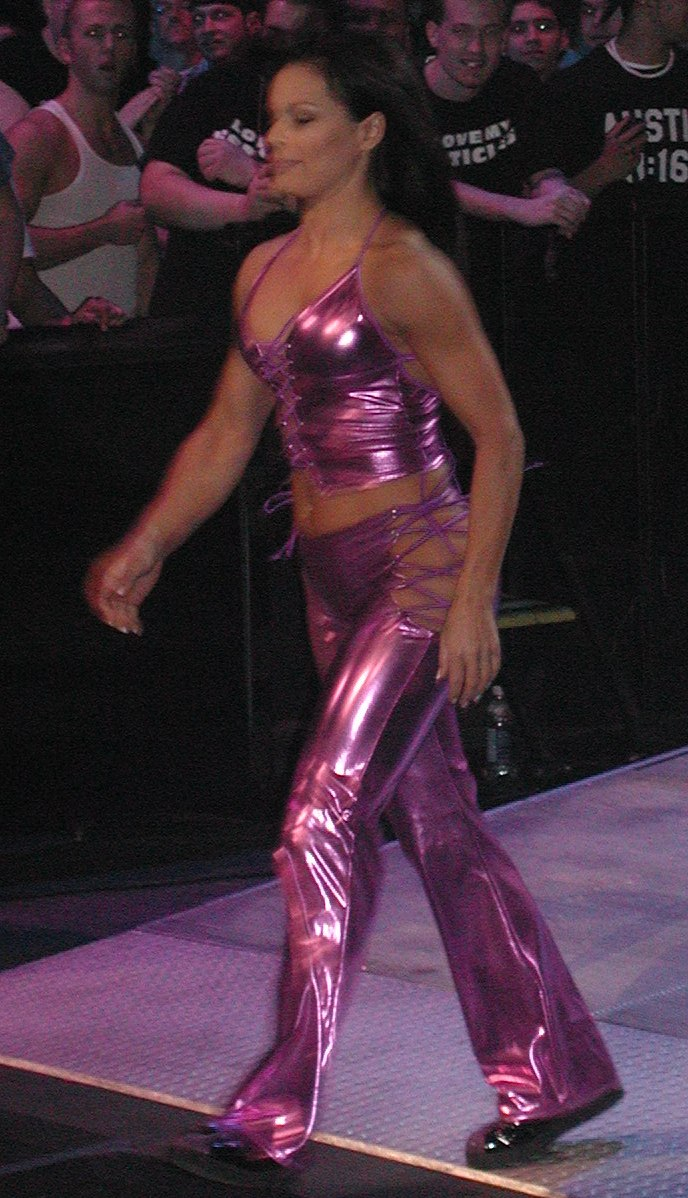
Ivory during a WWE Raw live show in March 2003

Ivory returned to WWF television on the August 6 episode of Raw, joining The Alliance during The Invasion, a storyline where the former wrestlers of World Championship Wrestling (WCW) and Extreme Championship Wrestling (ECW) formed an alliance and "invaded" the WWF. Ivory formed an alliance with former WCW wrestlers Torrie Wilson and Stacy Keibler after helping them defeat Jacqueline in a handicap match, but later turned on Wilson due to her budding romance with Tajiri. Ivory eventually became the valet for Lance Storm. At No Mercy, Ivory accompanied Storm and The Hurricane to the ring, but the Hardy Boyz defeated the two men to retain their WCW World Tag Team Championship. Ivory went on to compete in the women's division, and on November 18 at the Survivor Series, she participated in a six-pack challenge for the vacant Women's Championship, which Trish Stratus won.

In early 2002, Ivory served as a trainer in the second series of Tough Enough. After the World Wrestling Federation was renamed "World Wrestling Entertainment" and the roster was split into two "brands", Raw and SmackDown!, Ivory was drafted to the SmackDown! brand. Continuing to portray a villainess, Ivory engaged in a brief feud with Tough Enough co-winners Linda Miles and Jackie Gayda, which led to her facing Miles on the June 8 episode of Velocity. Ivory won the match after Gayda shoved Miles off the top rope and costing her the match. On the June 13 episode of SmackDown!, Ivory teamed with Gayda in a losing effort against Miles and Trish Stratus. Along with several other SmackDown! wrestlers, Ivory was traded to Raw in exchange for The Big Show in November 2002. Throughout the remainder of 2002, she teamed with Victoria in tag team matches and feuded with Trish Stratus. In November of that year, she was also part of the WWE Raw Tour in India, becoming the first female performer to tour the country, however only appeared in media events and signings, as she was not booked to compete.

In 2003, Ivory became a face and wrestled sporadically in the women's division. In June of that year, she had three pinfall victories over the WWE Women's Champion, Jazz, but never received a title match opportunity. Her only pay-per-view appearance in the course of the year was on December 14 at Armageddon, where she unsuccessfully challenged Molly Holly for the Women's Championship, after Molly grabbed her tights for leverage, and managed to capture the victory. She also served as a trainer on the third season of Tough Enough, and did broadcasting duties at WWE events. Ivory also spent eight weeks working as a trainer at WWE's then-developmental territory, Ohio Valley Wrestling (OVW) and also made one televised appearance against Jillian Hall in a losing effort. In May of that year, she and Todd Grisham began hosting The WWE Experience, a weekly television show that recapped events from Raw and SmackDown!. On July 22, 2005, several weeks before WWE Experience ended in August 2005, WWE announced that Ivory had opted not to renew her contract with the company.

=== Independent circuit (2005–2006) ===
After leaving WWE, Moretti began wrestling sporadically on the independent circuit under her birth name. On November 19, 2005, in Spartanburg, South Carolina at A Tribute to Starrcade, she teamed with Bambi to defeat Team Blondage (Krissy Vaine and Amber O'Neal) for the CCW Tag Team Championship. On April 21, 2006, in Surrey, British Columbia, Moretti defeated Rebecca Knox for Extreme Canadian Championship Wrestling (ECCW)'s NWA SuperGirls Championship. She also successfully retained her title in a match the following night. Afterward, Moretti decided to stay with ECCW to help create a strong women's division. She held the title for approximately five months before losing it to Nattie Neidhart on October 8, 2006.

On March 5, 2011, Moretti appeared at the Women Superstars Uncensored (WSU) 4 Year Anniversary event, where she was inducted into the WSU Hall of Fame. She also appeared on the event, preventing Rick Cataldo from interfering successfully in the WSU Spirit Championship bout, hitting Cataldo with the Poison Ivory, between Brittney Savage and Sassy Stephie. As a result, Stephie was able to win, capturing the championship and thanking Ivory for her help.

=== Sporadic WWE appearances and Hall of Fame (2015–present) ===
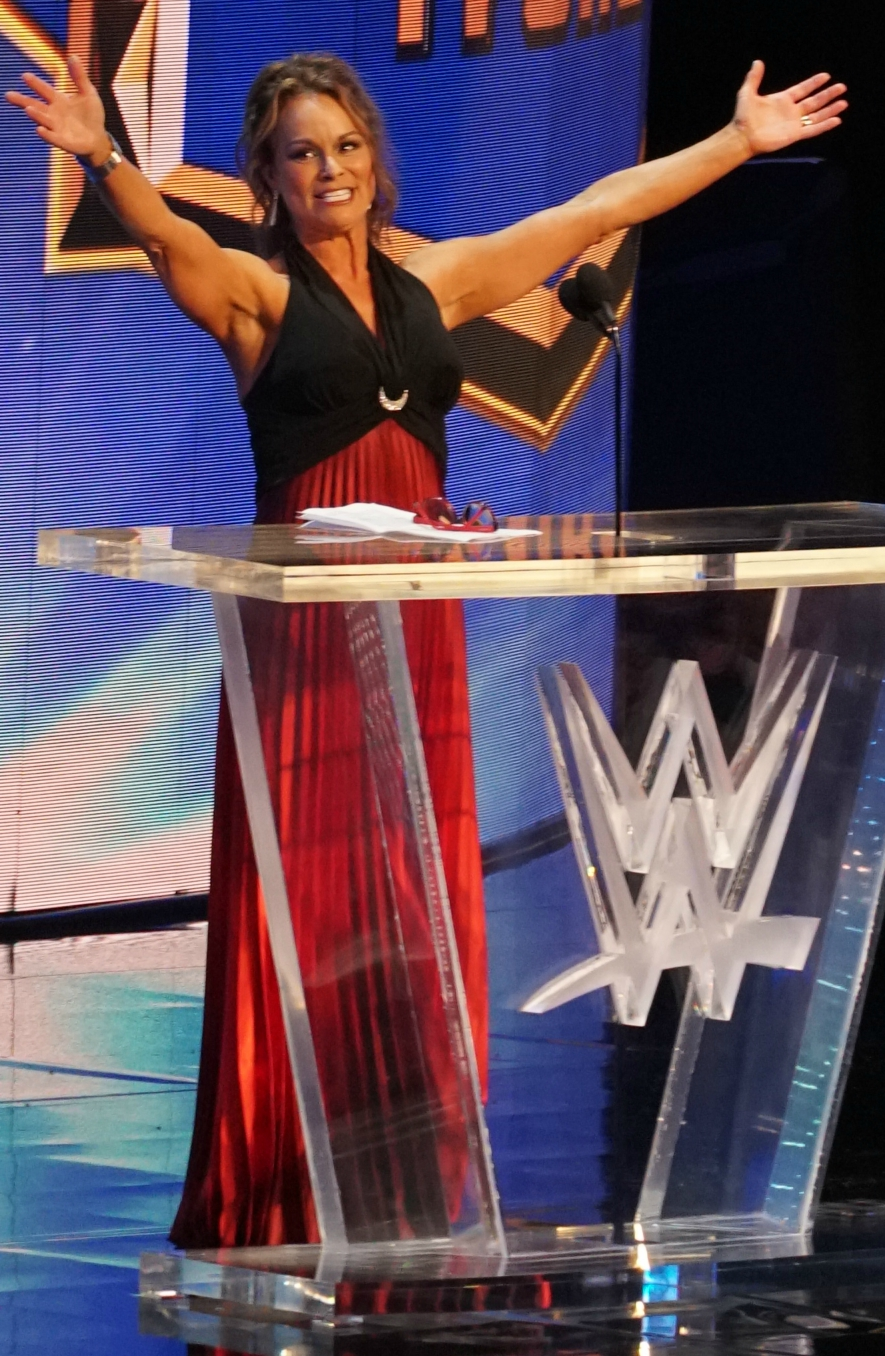
Ivory during her speech of induction at the WWE Hall of Fame in April 2018

Ivory took part in the WrestleMania Axxess convention from WrestleMania 31 in March 2015 and later appeared on The WWE List, a digital series that aired on WWE.com. On January 27, 2016, she appeared on the WWE Network program Table for 3, alongside fellow wrestlers Alundra Blayze and Molly Holly.

On February 12, 2018, it was announced that Ivory would be inducted into the WWE Hall of Fame class of 2018. At the ceremony on April 6, she was inducted by Molly Holly. On April 8, she appeared alongside the 2018 Hall of Fame class at WrestleMania 34. Ivory made her in-ring return for WWE's first ever all-women's pay per view, WWE Evolution, to compete in a battle royal for a future title shot at the WWE Raw Women's Championship. She lasted longer than all of the returning female legends, placing fifth after being eliminated by Asuka. In 2019, she was in attendance for the following year's WWE Hall of Fame ceremony in support of Torrie Wilson.

On January 29, 2022, Ivory returned to WWE in her Right To Censor gimmick, entering the 2022 Women's Royal Rumble match at number 18. She started to cut a promo on her way to the ring and lasted an overall 25 seconds in the match, before being eliminated by Rhea Ripley. At age 60, she became the oldest woman to enter the women's Royal Rumble, and the third oldest competitor in any Royal Rumble behind Jerry Lawler at 62, and Jimmy Snuka at 64.

Moretti was shown in the crowd on July 13, 2025, during the Evolution 2 event, being recognized as one of the pioneers of WWE's Women's Evolution alongside several female WWE Hall of Famers and legends.

== Other media ==
Moretti (as Ivory) has appeared in nine WWE video games. She made her in-game debut at WWF WrestleMania 2000 and appears in WWF SmackDown! 2: Know Your Role, WWF No Mercy, WWF SmackDown! Just Bring It, WWF Raw, WWE SmackDown! Shut Your Mouth, WWE 2K17 (DLC), WWE 2K18 and WWE 2K19.

In 2012, Moretti appeared in the documentary, GLOW: The Story of the Gorgeous Ladies of Wrestling, which was directed by Brett Whitcomb and premiered at Hot Docs Canadian International Documentary Festival. The documentary served as the inspiration for the fictional television series GLOW on Netflix.

Moretti has appeared in numerous San Juan Community Theatre productions, including Chicago as Velma Kelly. She has also judged local dog shows and modelled in the annual county fair show, "Fashion Trashion".

== Personal life ==
Moretti was born in Los Angeles, California and raised in Inglewood, California She has three siblings: two brothers and one sister. She studied public relations at the University of Southern California (USC), and she was a cheerleader for the Los Angeles Express of the United States Football League (USFL) in the mid-1980s. Prior to beginning her career in wrestling, Moretti worked as a make-up artist for the cosmetic brand Revlon.

After leaving WWE, Moretti began working in the landscaping industry. Moretti also worked with her niece to help the pet population affected by Hurricane Katrina. In addition, Moretti volunteered for an organization called Best Friends Animal Society, which is a no-kill animal shelter (a shelter that does not euthanize to control animal populations) in Utah. She also worked with her local animal shelter on San Juan Island in northwestern Washington, where she has resided since 2000. While working at the shelter, she met her eventual business partner Jessica Ray, with whom she opened Downtown Dog in 2007. The facility is an animal daycare, as well as a training, grooming, and cat boarding company located in Friday Harbor, Washington. In June 2007, they expanded the business to include veterinary care and later the Bow Wow Bus, which takes the dogs on outings. Moretti has taken classes to learn how to groom animals and now grooms them as part of the business.

== Championships and accomplishments ==
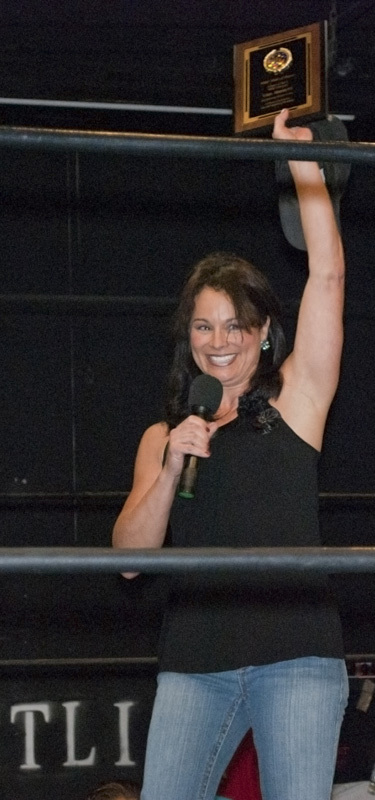
Ivory during her induction into the WSU Hall of Fame in March 2011

- Carolina Championship Wrestling
  - CCW Women's Tag Team Championship (1 time) – with Bambi
- Cauliflower Alley Club
  - Women's Wrestling Award (2012)
- Gorgeous Ladies of Wrestling
  - GLOW Championship (1 time)
  - GLOW Tag Team Championship (1 time) – with Ashley Cartier
- Ladies Sports Club
  - LSC Championship (1 time)
- Powerful Women of Wrestling
  - POWW Championship (2 times)
- Pro Wrestling This Week
  - Wrestler of the Week (March 13–19, 1988)
- SuperGirls Wrestling
  - SuperGirls Championship (1 time)
- Women Superstars Uncensored
  - WSU Hall of Fame (Class of 2011)
- World Wrestling Federation / WWE
  - WWF Women's Championship (3 times)
  - WWE Hall of Fame (Class of 2018)
