= Trudy Adams =

American actress and professional wrestler

Professional wrestling career
- Ring name: Amy the Farmer's Daughter; Brandi Mae
- Billed from: Hog Hollow, Nebraska; Spivey, Kansas
- Debut: 1987
- Retired: 1991

Trudy Adams was an American actress and retired female professional wrestler, who wrestled in the Gorgeous Ladies of Wrestling as Amy the Farmer's Daughter and in the Powerful Women of Wrestling, the Ladies Sports Club and the American Wrestling Association as Brandi Mae.

== Professional wrestling career ==
Adams debuted as a professional wrestler in early 1987 in the Gorgeous Ladies of Wrestling promotion as "Amy the Farmer's Daughter". She formed a successful tag team with The California Doll (Jane Hamlin). Adams only appeared during season two of the GLOW television series.

When promoter David McLane left GLOW in 1987, Adams was one of several GLOW performers that joined his new Powerful Women of Wrestling promotion. Upon joining POWW, Adams changed her ring name to "Brandi Mae", but maintained the same country farmer gimmick. She and Hamlin (now renamed "Malibu") reunited as The Bombshell Blondes. They became the top contenders for the POWW Tag Team Championship, which was held by Luna Vachon and Hot Rod Andie.

In 1988, Adams joined the American Wrestling Association while continuing to wrestle for POWW. As Brandi Mae, she became the top contender for the AWA World Women's Championship, which was held by Madusa Miceli. Adams feuded with Miceli in a series of singles matches, as well as tag team matches pitting Miceli and Debbie Combs against Adams and Heidi Lee Morgan. During this time, Adams enlisted the aid of Rocky Mountain Thunder to counter the ringside presence of Curt Hennig, whom Miceli was managing. In addition to managing Rocky Mountain Thunder, she also became the manager of Cousin Luke. In December 1988, Adams wrestled in a 9-woman battle royal at the AWA SuperClash III pay-per-view. During this time, Adams also appeared in the Delta Tiger Lilies promotion, where she formed a tag team with Candi Devine and continued her feud with Miceli and Combs.

While still competing in POWW, she formed a second tag team with Bambi named The Country Connection in 1989. The promotion closed in 1990. Adams then briefly worked for McLane's newest promotion, Ladies Sports Club, beginning in 1990. During this time, she held the LSC Television Championship. The Ladies Sports Club closed in 1991 and Adams retired from professional wrestling shortly thereafter.

Beckie Mullen (Sally, the farmer’s daughter) Ursula Hayden (babe the farmer’s daughter) both passed away from cancer. However, there is no report of death for Trudy Adams (Amy the farmer’s daughter)

== Championships and accomplishments ==
- Ladies Sports Club
  - LSC Television Championship (1 time)
