= Hollywood (wrestler) =

American professional wrestler

Personal information
- Born: Jeanne Marie Basone; May 19, 1963 (age 63) Glendale, California, U.S.
- Website: jeannebasone.com

Professional wrestling career
- Ring name(s): Hollywood; Jeanne Basone; Wonder Womyn
- Billed height: 5 ft 7 in (170 cm)
- Billed weight: 122 lb (55 kg)
- Trained by: Mando Guerrero; Cynthia Peretti
- Debut: December 1985

Jeanne Marie Basone (born May 19, 1963), better known by her ring name Hollywood, is an American professional wrestler, actress, model and stuntwoman.

Basone's memoir Hooray for Hollywood! The True Story of the Original GLOW Girl was released on November 30, 2024.

== Early life ==
Basone was born in Glendale, California, but was raised in nearby Burbank, California. She attended John Burroughs High School and graduated in 1981. She was working as a phlebotomist when GLOW advertised for a women's sports television show.

== Career ==
She was selected for the women's wrestling promotion, Gorgeous Ladies of Wrestling (GLOW), in 1986 by founder David McLane. Basone won the United States Championship in a match against Tulsa on the 1993 pay-per-view. She is the only wrestler to star in both the pilot and all four seasons of the promotion. After the cancellation of GLOW in 1989, Basone continued to compete on the independent circuit as Hollywood. She appeared in several all-female wrestling promotions, including CRUSH, Beauty Slammers, Hottest Ladies of Wrestling, and NWA.

=== Acting ===
Basone appeared in numerous television series and films as an actress and stuntwoman, including JAG, Days of Our Lives, Chuck, Married... with Children, Saved by the Bell, The Larry Sanders Show, In Living Color, and Me, Myself & Irene. She also played Jane in the game Plumbers Don't Wear Ties for the 3DO home console and Windows PC. She has teamed up with international award-winning filmmaker Christopher Annino, ECW legend Angel Orsini and producer Evan Ginzburg. She is in the first silent feature film in 80 years, Silent Times, and Confessions of Nick Sargenti and the Lollipop Gang. Hollywood appeared on 15 episodes of Family Feud and appeared on The Phil Donahue Show and The Sally Jessy Raphael Show. She appeared in the pictorial Dec. 1989 issue of Playboy magazine.

=== Entrepreneurship ===
Basone currently owns an artisan soap company, Hollywood Botanika.

== Book ==
- Hooray for Hollywood! The True Story of the Original GLOW Girl (2024), Hollywould Productions Inc.
