= Britt Baron =

American actress (born 1991)

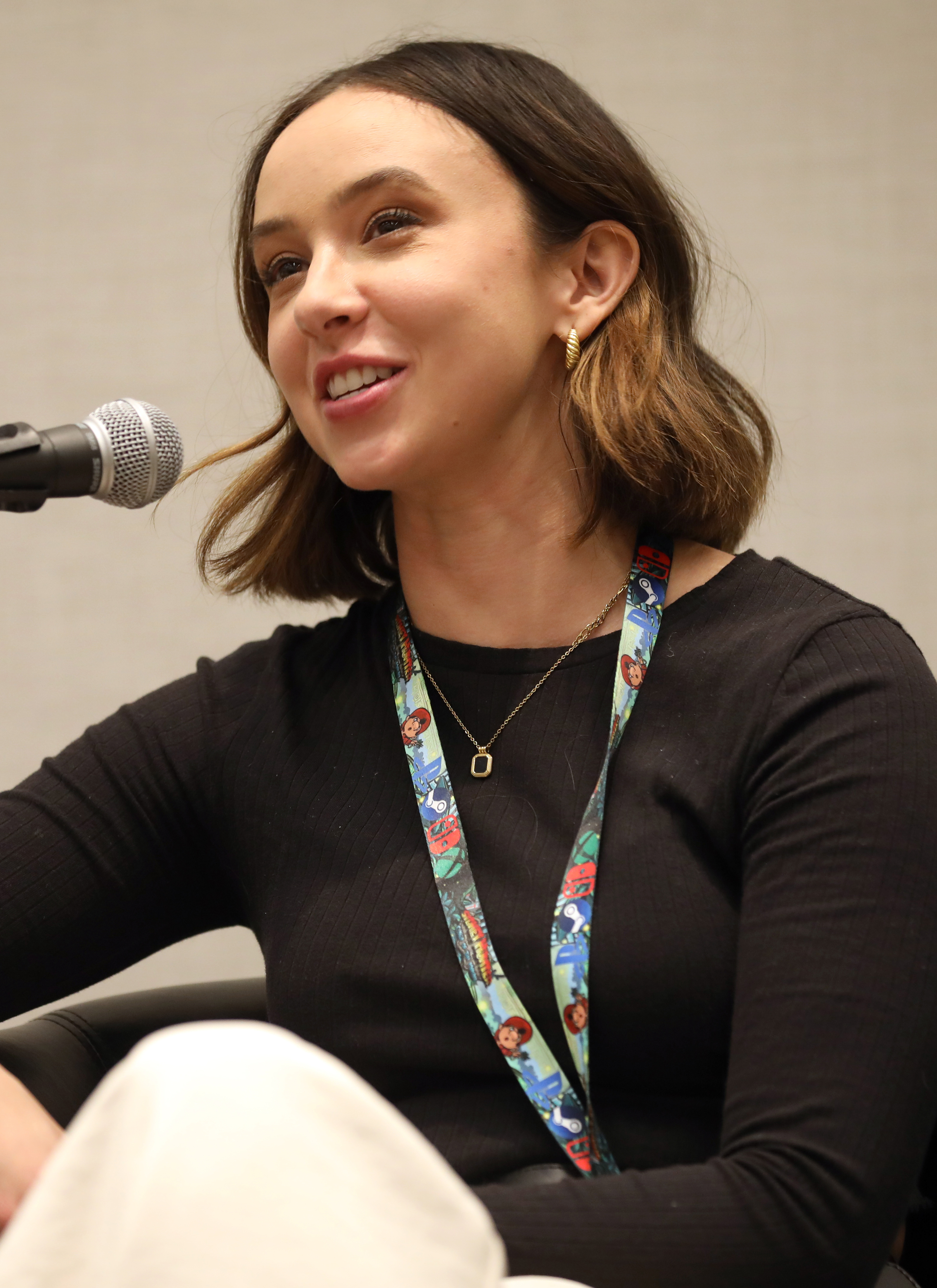
- Baron in 2024
- Born: Brittany Noelle Uomoleale; October 16, 1991 (age 34); White Plains, New York, U.S.
- Education: University of Michigan
- Occupation: Actress
- Years active: 2014–present
- Spouse: Taber Onthank (m. 2022)

Britt Baron (born Brittany Noelle Uomoleale; born October 16, 1991) is an American actress, best known for her role as Justine Biagi in the television series GLOW (2017–2019) and for voicing Tifa Lockhart in the Final Fantasy VII Remake franchise (2020–Present), for which she received multiple Awards for Best Supporting Performance.

== Early life ==
Britt Baron was born Brittany Noelle Uomoleale in White Plains, New York and grew up in Westport, Connecticut. She graduated in Performance Arts at the University of Michigan in 2013.

== Career ==
Baron has worked as a voice over, film, and theatre actress. She starred in East of Eden and Grand Concourse at Steppenwolf Theatre in Chicago.

== Personal life ==
In 2022, Baron married her high school boyfriend Taber Onthank.

== Filmography ==
=== Film ===
Year	Title	Role	Notes	Ref.
2015	Meshes of Dusk	Liv		
2019	Bushwick Beats	Sadie		
2021	Amy and Peter Are Getting Divorced	Maya		
2021	Aftermath	Dani		
2023	Daddy	F.R.A.N.N.		
2023	V/H/S/85	Karen		

=== Television ===
Year	Title	Role	Notes	Ref.
2014	Jennifer Falls	Sophie	Episode: "Triangle"	
2014	Awkward	Sex Crazed Student	Episode: "The New Sex Deal"	
2015	Halo: The Fall of Reach	Linda (Adult)	Main cast	
2015	Chicago P.D.	Party Girl	Episode: "Forget My Name'	
2016–2017	Criminal Minds: Beyond Borders	Josie Garrett	Guest cast: seasons 1–2	
2017	Grey's Anatomy	Mary Parkman	Episode: "Don't Stop Me Now"	
2017	Lucifer	Maggie Cole	Episode: "The Sin Bin"	
2017–2019	GLOW	Justine "Scab" Biagi	Recurring cast: season 1, main cast: seasons 2–3	
2018	Rob Riggle's Ski Master Academy	Brit Brit Hamsteak	Main cast	
2019	Young Justice	Livewire (voice)	Recurring cast (season 3)	
2019	All Rise	Andrea Monroe	Episode: "Sweet Bird of Truth"	
2020	Into The Dark	Valentine Fawkes	Episode: "My Valentine"	
2020	The Thing About Harry	Stasia	Television film	

=== Video games ===
Year	Title	Role	Notes	Ref.
2015	Halo 5: Guardians	Linda-058, additional voices	Credited as Brittany Uomoleale	
2016	Skylanders: Imaginators	Aurora / Imaginators		
2016	Dishonored 2	Witch		
2017	Agents of Mayhem	Pride Trooper		
2017	Dishonored: Death of the Outsider	Witches		
2018	Destiny 2: Forsaken	Ada-1		
2020	Final Fantasy VII Remake	Tifa Lockhart		
2020	Fallout 76: Wastelanders	Tessa Crews, Settlers, additional voices		
2022	Crisis Core: Final Fantasy VII Reunion	Tifa Lockhart		
2023	Star Wars Jedi: Survivor	Gabs		
2024	Final Fantasy VII Rebirth	Tifa Lockhart		
2027	Final Fantasy VII Revelation	Tifa Lockhart		

=== Audio book ===
Year	Title	Role	Notes
2015	Rain of the Ghosts	Rain Cacique	Credited as Brittany Uomoleale

Awards and nominations

Year	Award	Category	Work	Result	References
2024	Grand Game Awards 2024	Best Supporting Performance	Final Fantasy VII Rebirth (Tifa Lockhart)	Won	
2024	Famitsu Dengeki Game Awards 2024	Character ("Tifa Lockhart")	Final Fantasy VII Rebirth (Tifa Lockhart)	Won	
