= List of women's wrestling promotions in the United States =

This is a list of women's professional wrestling promotions in the United States, both active and defunct women's promotions from the 1950s through the present.

Promotion name	Location	Promoter(s)	Years active	Notes
Mission Pro Wrestling	Buda, Texas	Thunder Rosa	2020–present	
Professional Girl Wrestling Association	Raleigh, North Carolina	Randy Powell	1992–present	
Queens of Combat	Charlotte, North Carolina	Josette Bynum	2004–present	
Shimmer Women Athletes	Berwyn, Illinois	Dave Prazak and Allison Danger	2005–present	
Shine Wrestling	Ybor City, Florida	Dave Prazak and Lexie Fyfe	2012–present	WWNLive brand and sister promotion to Shimmer Women Athletes
Spark Joshi Puroresu of America	Santa Fe, New Mexico	"Chibi C.B." C.B. Liffer and Francis Jay	2023–present	
Sukeban	New York, New York	Dream Slam Productions	2023–present	
Ultimate Women of Wrestling	Los Angeles, California	Rampage Jackson	2022-present	
Women of Wrestling	Los Angeles, California	David McLane	2000–2001; 2012-present	
Women Superstars United	New Jersey	Jac Sabboth (2006–2007); Sean McCaffrey (2007–2012); Drew Cordeiro (2012–2014); D. J. Hyde (2013–present)	2006–present	Sister promotion to Combat Zone Wrestling and member of the United Wrestling Network
Women's Wrestling Army	Chicago, Illinois	Maria Kanellis	2022-present	
Women's Wrestling Revolution	Providence, Rhode Island	Drew Cordeiro	2016-present	Sister promotion to Beyond Wrestling
Defunct
ChickFight	San Francisco, California	Jason Deadrich	2004–2008	
Dangerous Women of Wrestling	Philadelphia, Pennsylvania	Steve O'Neill, Dan Kowal	1999–2007	Formerly "Gorgeous Ladies of Outrageous Wrestling" until 2003
Gorgeous Ladies of Wrestling (G.L.O.W.)	Las Vegas, Nevada	Meshulam Riklis (1986–2001); Ursula Hayden (2001-2003)	1986-2003	
Ladies Major League Wrestling	Florida	Howard Brody	1989–1992	
Ladies International Wrestling Association	North Carolina	The Fabulous Moolah	1990-2000	
Ladies Professional Wrestling Association	Laughlin, Nevada	Tor Berg	1989–1998	
Naked Women's Wrestling League	Las Vegas, Nevada	Howard Mann	2004–2009	
Powerful Women of Wrestling	Indianapolis, Indiana	David McLane	1987–1990	
Rise Wrestling	Naperville, Illinois	Kevin Harvey	2016–2020	Sister promotion to Shimmer Women Athletes
Women's Extreme Wrestling	Philadelphia, Pennsylvania	Dan Kowal, Greg Bagarozy, Steve Karel	2002–2008	
World Women's Wrestling	Jamaica Plain, Massachusetts	Sheldon Goldberg	2006–2010	
World Women's Wrestling Association	Los Angeles, California	Mildred Burke	1950–1960	
Wrestlicious	Tampa, Florida	Jonathan Vargas, Johnny Cafarella, and Jimmy Hart	2009–2010	

== See also ==
- List of women's wrestling promotions
