= Garo Mardirossian =

Armenian-American lawyer

- Born: Garo Mardirossian; 1956 (age 69–70); Aleppo, Syria
- Education: B.A. Economics, University of California, Los Angeles; J.D., Whittier Law School
- Occupations: Attorney; judge pro tem; arbitrator
- Years active: 1981–present
- Employer(s): Mardirossian & Associates Inc. (formerly known as Law Offices of Garo Mardirossian)

Garo Mardirossian (born 1956) (Note: The 1995 American Lawyer and Los Angeles Daily Journal articles, amongst others at the time, note Mardirossian's age at 39 at the time of the Dole verdict.) is an Armenian-American lawyer practicing in Los Angeles. Mardirossian has handled cases involving personal injury, civil rights, complex litigation, product liability, and constitutional law. Several of the cases he has been involved in have garnered national and international attention, including the Dole bridal shower and the Thomas beating cases by different police agencies. The Dole Family case involved numerous victims, including the television celebrity and female wrestler known as Mt. Fiji (Emily Dole), (Note: Emily Dole professionally in wrestling is known as Mountain Fiji, sometimes abbreviated incorrectly in publications as Mt. Fiji rather than Mtn. Fiji.) and resulted in the highest monetary jury award against a policing agency in U.S. history. (Note: The legal case involved 36 plaintiffs, including the taking of the depositions of Sheriff Sherman Block and over 50 deputies. The final judgement by jury verdict that was paid with interest was $24,850,000.)

== See also ==
- Rodney King beating, another later Los Angeles major police brutality case.
- History of the Armenian Americans in Los Angeles
- Armenian diaspora
