= Plumbers Don't Wear Ties =

1993 video game

- Developer: United Pixtures
- Publishers: United Pixtures; Kirin Entertainment (3DO); Limited Run Games (re-release)
- Director: Michael Anderson
- Producer: Michael Anderson
- Programmers: John Crane; Michael Chang; Jason Chen; Tun Huang
- Artists: Albert Truong; Andrew Webster; Theodore Serafica
- Writer: Michael Anderson
- Composer: Martin Golnick
- Platforms: 3DO; Windows; Nintendo Switch; PlayStation 4; PlayStation 5; Xbox Series X/S
- Release: Windows; NA: 1993; 3DO; NA: September 30, 1994; Windows, PS4, PS5, Switch, Xbox Series X/S; WW: March 5, 2024
- Genre: Adventure
- Mode: Single-player

Plumbers Don't Wear Ties is an adult-oriented adventure video game developed by United Pixtures and published by Kirin Entertainment in September 1994 for the 3DO. An earlier version for Windows with very limited distribution was published in 1993 by United Pixtures itself. The game stars Edward J. Foster and Jeanne Basone as John and Jane, two people who are being pressured by their respective parents to go out and find a spouse. The player's task is to get John and Jane together.

Plumbers Don't Wear Ties sold poorly and received overwhelmingly negative reviews from critics for its lackluster production value, nonsensical storyline, poor acting and humor, and for primarily being presented as a slideshow despite being advertised as a full motion video game. The game is considered one of the worst video games of all time.

At E3 2021, a re-release of the game for Nintendo Switch, PlayStation 4, PlayStation 5, Windows, and Xbox Series X/S was announced by Limited Run Games. It was published in March 2024.

== Gameplay ==
In each part of the game, the player can choose how the story will progress.

The only interaction is where the player gets to choose the storyline (two to three choices at a time) in a DVD menu-style manner, although there are only one to two right choices. The player will use the D-pad (or mouse in the PC version) to make a choice and then will press the A button to see what will happen for choosing that option. At certain points in the game, the player has the opportunity to choose what actions John or Jane will do; making the right choices will bring the characters together while making the wrong choices will result in commentary from the game's two narrators, who sometimes fight with each other. If enough bad choices are made, the player is given the choice to restart the game or try to make the right choice.

== Plot ==
A full motion video clip features the character Jane introducing the player to the main objective and basic rules of the game. From that point onwards, the entire format is that of still photographs with actors reading the dialogue. The narrator also changes once during the game, before being changed back to the original a few scenes later.

In the early 1990s, Los Angeles locals John (Edward J. Foster) and Jane (Jeanne Basone), are both being pressured by their respective parents to find a suitable spouse. John, a plumber, is told by his mother (Violetta Gevorkian, voiced by Samantha Eggersoll) to go to her house with the girl she had set a date up with, Amy, for dinner at 6:00 pm. Jane, meanwhile, a college student who is considered a "daddy's girl", is going to a job interview, having disliked her coworkers at her previous job.

John and Jane both meet in a parking lot by 8:00 AM and John instantly falls in love with Jane, calling her "perfect". John decides not to go to work and stays in the parking lot to wait for Jane to leave from her job interview so he can meet Jane again, thinking it is more important than his job, possibly due to his mother's wanting of a spouse for him. Around this time, it is revealed that the game is narrated by Harry Armis (who also played Jane's father).

When Jane is at the interview, her prospective boss, Paul Mark Thresher (Paul Bokor), tells her that, despite her outstanding qualifications and recommendations, her position was canceled an hour before. When Jane gets very upset about this, Thresher says that "something can be worked out, after all," and asks her to take her clothes off, which appears to be an attempt to lead Jane to have sex with him to get a job. However, when Jane refuses, Thresher attempts to rape her, and eventually, Jane (still partially undressed) runs away from him. John sees Thresher chasing Jane and dashes off to save her. After a long chase sequence through the streets of Los Angeles, the three find themselves in an abandoned building. Around this time, Harry Armis is replaced by a female narrator named Wilma (Thyra Metz). Later, she is shot multiple times by Armis, who then returns as narrator.

After the chase, Thresher offers to pay Jane $5 million for sex. Jane refuses after John confesses his feelings for her. John and Jane both walk out of the house with Thresher having a date with somebody else (Samantha Eggersoll) as a consolation to lose Jane to John, and asking to call the police, while John and Jane return to the parking lot where they first met.

As a reward for being honorable, Jane decides to treat John to dinner and they travel to her place on John's bike. While he attempts to tell her that his profession is that of a plumber, Jane believes he is joking, then replies, "Plumbers don't wear ties."

Bad endings include the following:

- During Jane's interview, if any of the two options besides Thresher ordering Jane to undress are selected, a fail state will result. The option in which Jane gets a job will result in her rejecting John upon leaving the building, and the option in which Jane gets sent away by Thresher will result in her failing to find John after he drove off.
- If John doesn't chase after Thresher in the parking lot, Thresher will seduce Jane, and the two will suddenly become a couple before the game tells the player that they should try again.
- If Jane accepts Thresher's offer of money, John is forced into marrying Amy and having 3 kids to please his mother, and Jane becomes a prostitute.
- If "Gimme Something Completely Different" is selected after Thresher is dealt with, Jane confesses to John that she is still a virgin and plans to become a nun, much to John's surprise. After failing to talk her out of it, John is forced to return home to have dinner with his mother, who arranges a shotgun wedding between him and Amy.

== Cast ==
- Edward J. Fasulo as John (credited as Edward J. Foster)
- Jeanne Basone as Jane
- Paul Bokor as Thresher
- Michael Anderson as the Male Narrator and Jane's father (credited as Harry Armis)
- Thyra Metz as Wilma, the Female Narrator
- Violetta Gevorkian as John's mother
- Samantha Eggersoll as Thresher's date and the voice of John's mother
- Danny Beyda, Giovanni Cuarez, Grant Swanson, and Soumaya Young as alternate versions of John and Jane during a fantasy sequence

== Development and release ==
Plumbers Don't Wear Ties was published by Fremont, California-based game company Kirin Entertainment, a subsidiary of Digital Stuff Inc. It was developed and produced by Michael Anderson. The musical score was provided by Martin Golnick.

The Windows version of the game was released before the 3DO version; however, due to a limited number of copies being made, it faded into obscurity. In 2017, a user looking to test an old laptop discovered a listing for the PC version of the game, and after searching through WorldCat, discovered one copy at the Ball State University library. Through Reddit, users were able to obtain the game and made a version emulated through DOSBox for users to try, then later uploaded on the Internet Archive. In comparison to the 3DO version, the Windows version of the game features higher-quality audio than the 3DO version and uncensored cutscenes without the use of a code. Both versions are also playable on various modern systems using ScummVM.

Limited Run Games announced during E3 2021 that they would be porting the game to the Nintendo Switch, PlayStation 4, PlayStation 5 and Microsoft Windows, with both digital and physical releases. It was announced to be released in 2022. On July 12, 2023, Limited Run Games announced a release date of September 2023. Preorders for the physical release of the game opened on September 22, 2023, with the digital release of the game releasing on March 5, 2024. The new release includes additional features such as save states, an in-game gallery, documentary footage, and a dungeon crawler mode through which the player unlocks bonus content. Limited Run Games also released a novelization of the game, written by Mike Drucker.

== Reception ==
One of the game's major criticisms was for being a slide show and not a full-motion video.

Though the game was an obscure title due to the 3DO format, it gained attention through James Rolfe's coverage of it as part of his Angry Video Game Nerd series in 2009 (episode 74).

Plumbers Don't Wear Ties is widely considered to be one of the worst games of all time. It received negative attention mainly due to much of the game being presented as a slideshow despite being advertised as a full motion video game (only its introduction was FMV) where it uses mostly still images instead of full motion graphics as well as random, out-of-place color filters. Other criticisms focused on its "surreal" storyline and poor voice acting.

In giving the game a 15% rating, Diego Antico wrote: "It's hard to determine where Plumbers Don't Wear Ties is at its most horrendous. Is it in the pathetic music department? The graphics (or its lack thereof)? The awful gameplay?" Allgame gave the game one star. The site made note of how despite it being advertised as a full motion video, the game was simply a slideshow. Video Games & Computer Entertainment magazine criticized the game for being all just "still pictures of the director's friends acting like goofballs and delivering bad voiceovers", also stating: "Not even the promise of some naked pictures could save this disc from becoming a joke around here. Avoid this one at all costs, it looks like a bad Public Access show and that's the pits." PC Gamer, giving the game a 3%, said that the game was funny for only 30 seconds, calling the game an "irksome and yobbishly executed pseudo-pornographic photo story with the wit and charm of an elephant's arse". PC Format rated the game a 4%, the lowest rating the magazine had ever given to a video game.

In 1997, Electronic Gaming Monthly listed Plumbers Don't Wear Ties as the fourth worst console video game of all time. PC Gamer dubbed it a "shallow, hateful waste of a game, [that] may very well be responsible for having killed the 3DO, interactive fiction, and the whale", naming it #1 on its "Must NOT Buy" list in May 2007. It was #27 in UGO Network's 102 "Worst Video Games of All Time", concluding "If you have the patience, check out a video walkthrough online of either the worst storyline in gaming history, or a post-modern masterpiece", and #4 in Screen Play's, calling the game a "hilariously dodgy FMV adventure with actors who make Home and Away look like Shakespeare". The game was put in 411mania.com's 2008 "Hall of Shame", with writer Vincent Chiucchi stating "By Jove, this could very well be the worst game ever!" It was included among the worst games of all time by GamesRadar in 2014.

The game's cover art was one of 1UP.com's "Worst Videogame Box Covers", criticizing its use of clip art and fonts. IGN has cited Plumbers Don't Wear Ties as "a symbol for everything that was wrong with giving a license to anyone that wanted one", referring to the fact that 3DO publishers only needed to pay a $3 royalty per disc and did not have to join a stringent licensing program like other game consoles, which led to many low-quality adult-oriented video games being released for the system.
