= Gorgeous Ladies of Wrestling =

Women's professional wrestling promotion

- Acronym: G.L.O.W.
- Founded: 1986; 40 years ago
- Style: Women's professional wrestling
- Headquarters: Las Vegas, Nevada (1986–1992)
- Founder: David McLane
- Owner(s): Meshulam Riklis (1986–2001); Ursula Hayden (2001–2022)
- Successor: 'Unofficial: Powerful Women of Wrestling; Women of Wrestling
- Website: gorgeousladiesofwrestling.com

Gorgeous Ladies of Wrestling (also known by its initials as GLOW or G.L.O.W.) is a women's professional wrestling promotion that began in 1986 (the pilot was filmed in December 1985) and has continued in various forms after it left television. Colorful characters, strong women, and over-the-top comedy sketches were integral to the series' success. Most of the performers were actresses, models, dancers or stunt women hoping to enter show business.

== Inception ==
David B. McLane created the series while working as an announcer and promoter with Indianapolis-based World Wrestling Association (WWA) after seeing fans react to women's wrestling. The show runner Dick the Bruiser believed that Indianapolis audiences would not be receptive to a wrestling promotion featuring female wrestlers and dismissed the concept as an unprofitable novelty.

Undeterred, McLane went to Hollywood and posted casting notices in The Hollywood Reporter and Variety, leading to over 500 women showing up for auditions at The Hyatt on Sunset. The first audition was at Gold's Gym, and the dozen finalists selected trained for six weeks at the Broadway Boxing Gym at 108th and Broadway in the South Los Angeles neighborhood of Watts. McLane hired professional Mexican wrestler Mando Guerrero to train them and later brought in wrestling veteran Cynthia Peretti (professionally known as Princess Jasmine) to take over from Guerrero. Peretti also wrestled in the series as "Pepper".

McLane partnered with the television distribution company Independent Network Incorporated (INI), headed by former Lorimar-Telepictures executive Irv Holender. Holender's previous credits included producing Gumby, which was revived about the same time. It was through Holender that McLane met Meshulam Riklis, chairman of Rapid-American Corporation, a conglomerate which included ownership of the Riviera Hotel and Casino on the Las Vegas Strip. Riklis arranged for the Riviera Hotel to host GLOW. Holender's firm was in charge of distribution (in a joint venture with a New York City based syndicator, MG/Perin) and McLane headed the venture. Matt Cimber, who had recently directed the movie Butterfly, starring Riklis' then wife Pia Zadora, was brought in to provide creative services and direct the shows.

A number of the original dozen wrestlers moved to Las Vegas and were supplemented by local women, many of whom had been actresses and showroom dancers. Lauri Thompson, a future Las Vegas attorney and lead dancer in the Folies Bergère at the Tropicana, played Susie Spirit. Thompson recruited others, creating a recruiting chain of other friends and dancers. One of those, Lorilyn Palmer, who played Colonel Ninotchka, took over training the new women. According to David McLane, the first actress hired was Jeanne Basone (who was working as a phlebotomist at the time) as the character Hollywood. Basone also appeared in Playboy, part of a pictorial titled Lethal Women. She went on to do stunt work and started her own wrestling production company Hollywould Productions.

The show was introduced at the 1986 NATPE Convention. Following the successful initial sale to 30 major television markets in the US and six other countries, McLane brought in Jackie Stallone, mother of Sylvester Stallone, to play kayfabe GLOW owner and the manager of the Good Girls. Kitty Burke as Aunt Kitty, was the manager for the Bad Girls. Stallone had been promoting a physical fitness gym for women only.

== Broadcast ==
The syndicated GLOW TV show was produced for four seasons (1986–1990). Seasons 1 and 2 were shot at the Riviera on Saturday afternoons with a casino crowd. McLane and the majority of the original cast left the company in a dispute over the domination of low brow, blue, Hee Haw style comedy Cimber had infused into the show. McLane's new promotion became Powerful Women of Wrestling. Seasons 3 and 4 were filmed at a former warehouse building approximately three miles east of the Riviera hotel which would later be a Harley-Davidson outlet. Cimber cast new actresses to play the wrestlers.

They wrestled approximately eight matches per live event. The show itself differed from Vince McMahon's World Wrestling Federation (WWF) in that the venture held live events only for the purpose of taping television programming, versus running live shows in various city locations each week. They had actual television seasons consisting of 26 episodes that were each rerun once to complete the year, with a total of 104 episodes produced and aired. As Cimber focused on producing, Andrew Hecker directed later episodes. A fifth season was being shot when the show went off the air in financial turmoil. Hecker directed an initial revival attempt in 1991, which became the pay per view special, GLOW: Gorgeous Ladies of Wrestling: Canvas Carnage, which included clips from every performer in the company's history including McLane's return as host. McLane later created Women of Wrestling, also directed by Hecker and syndicated to TV stations by MG/Perin, in 2000.

McLane performed as the ring announcer and host for Seasons 1 and 2. McLane's announcing voice was replaced in Season 2 to add more comedy feel to the episodes, using Miles Headlock (a computer generated knock-off of Max Headroom), and "Motormouth" Mike Morgan (who sounded a lot like Howard Cosell). Steve Blance was the senior referee in Season 2 before becoming GLOW's "commissioner" in Seasons 3 and 4. He was the regular recipient of a GLOW Girl beatdown in Season 2. Johnny Cafarella (as "Johnny C.") was the ring announcer for Seasons 3 and 4, was the figurehead owner (buying David McLane's "interest" in a storyline) and also served as company manager after the departure of McLane in 1987.

Each of the GLOW performers had their own rap song (personalized lyrics using the same backing track). It was shown on videotape prior to that wrestler's match. Similar to other wrestling promotions' use of wrestler-specific entrance themes, this gimmick may have been influenced by the Chicago Bears' "Super Bowl Shuffle". The music for the rap was written by Hank Donig, who did the music for the first two seasons supervised by Morris I. Diamond. Music for Seasons 3 and 4 was created by Brian Bogle and Ed Ryba under the name "Music out the Yang". Hecker gave each performer personalized Digital video effects including 3D effects and personalized logos, with Ann DeVilbiss as graphic designer.

GLOW began re-airing its entire third season and three episodes of season four on the streaming service Tubi under the name "The Original Ladies of Wrestling" as of 2020.

== Revival by Ursula Hayden ==
The GLOW company was owned and operated since 2001 by Ursula Hayden, who portrayed Babe the Farmer's Daughter, Princess of Darkness, and Donna Matrix. Her first venture with GLOW was a sold-out 2003 live event at the El Rey Theatre in Hollywood California. Followed by a DirecTV pay-per-view produced by Ursula Hayden and Johnny Cafarella, Glow's ring announcer season 3 and 4. In April 2012, GLOW returned to Las Vegas for a show that reunited former GLOW participants Hollywood (Jeanne Basone), Babe the Farmer's Daughter, Gremlina, Lightning, Thunder Bolt, Melody Trouble Vixen, Ashley Cartier, Godiva, Daisy, and Corporal Kelly. The show also featured new GLOW wrestlers, including Sara Deathray and VH1. Then later in 2012 she appeared in the documentary GLOW: The Story of the Gorgeous Ladies of Wrestling. It premiered on April 27, 2012, at the Hot Docs Canadian International Documentary Festival and won the Best Documentary award at the San Diego Comic-Con Film Festival. In 2017 after a few years of working with writers Liz Flahive and Carly Mensch, GLOW – a scripted comedy-drama series based on the actual wrestling promotion – was picked up by Netflix. Hayden served as a series consultant for the show until its cancellation due to the COVID-19 pandemic. Hayden died on December 3, 2022.

== Documentary ==
A documentary film, GLOW: The Story of the Gorgeous Ladies of Wrestling, was released in 2012. The film was directed by Brett Whitcomb and written by Bradford Thomason. It features the music of ESG. The film premiered to positive reviews at the Hot Docs Canadian International Documentary Festival, and has since been featured in New York Magazine, LA Weekly, RogerEbert.com, VICE, /Film, The Village Voice, and Mental Floss magazine. It won the Best Documentary award at the 2012 San Diego Comic-Con Film Festival, and Audience Choice Best Documentary at Sidewalk Film Festival in Birmingham, Alabama.

== Netflix series ==
GLOW is a TV series that premiered on Netflix in 2017. A scripted comedy drama, it tells the fictional story of a 1980s professional wrestling promotion that is based on the actual Gorgeous Ladies of Wrestling. It was created by Liz Flahive and Carly Mensch, and stars Alison Brie, Betty Gilpin, and Marc Maron.

== Alumnae ==
| Character | Actress(es) | Seasons |
|---|---|---|
| Americana | Cindy Maranne (Ferda) | 1, 2 |
| Amy The Farmer's Daughter | Trudy Adams | 2 |
| Angel | Andrea Laird | 2 |
| Ashley Cartier | Nadine Kadmiri | 1, 2 |
| Attache | Laura Fisher | 1, 2 |
| Babe the Farmer's Daughter | Ursula Hayden | 3, 4 |
| Beastie | Kelle Favara | 3, 4 |
| Big Bad Mama | Lynn Braxton | 3, 4 |
| Broadway Rose 1 | Eva Chirumbolo | |
| Broadway Rose 2 | Andrea Janell | 3 |
| Brunhilda | Deanne Murray | 4 |
| The California Doll 2 | Jayne Hamlin | 1, 2 |
| The California Doll 1 | Lynda Aldon | Pilot |
| Cheyenne Cher | Dee Chocktoot | 3, 4 |
| Colonel Ninotchka | Lori (Lynn) Palmer | 1–4 |
| Corporal Kelly | Olympia Hartauer | 1 |
| Corporal Kelly 2 | Lillian Weaver Crabtree | 3 |
| Daisy | Helena LaCount | 3, 4 |
| Dallas | Debi Pelletier | 1 |
| Debbie Debutante | Ann LaBree | 1, 2, interim 3 |
| Dementia 2 | Nancy Daly | 3 |
| Dementia, Sugar | Michelle Duze | 2 |
| Draculetta | Janna Denig | 4 |
| Ebony | Jan White | 1, 2 |
| Evangelina | Christy M. Smith | 3 |
| Godiva | Dawn Maestas | 3–5 |
| Gremlina | Sandy Manley | 3, 5 |
| Habana | Christina Garcia | 3 |
| The Heavy Metal Sisters (Chainsaw and Spike); The Housewives (Arlene and Phyllis) | Sharon Wilinsky (Chainsaw/Phyllis) and Donna Wilinsky (Spike/Arlene) | 1, 2 |
| The Hicks (Sarah and Mabel) | April Hom (Sarah) and Nadine Kadmiri (Mabel) | 1 |
| Hollywood | Jeanne Basone | 1–5 |
| Jailbait | Trish Casella/Trish King Casella | 3 (Unaired), 5 |
| Jungle Woman | Annette Marroquin | 1 |
| Justice | Narice Crockett | 3, 4 |
| Liberty | Penny/Penelope Johnson | 3 |
| Lightning | Cheryl Rusa | 3–5 |
| Little Egypt | Angelina Altishin | 1, 2, 5 |
| Little Feather | Kuno | 1 |
| Little Fiji | Theresa Woo | 1–3 |
| Magnolia The Southern Bell | Unknown | 4 |
| Major Tanya | Noelle Rose | 3, 4 |
| Matilda the Hun | Dee Booher | 1, 2 |
| Melody "Trouble" Vixen (MTV) | Eileen O'Hara | 3–5 |
| Mexi-Cali Red (Spanish Red's Cousin) Also Liberty in PPV Match | Unknown | 4–5 |
| Mika the Headhunter | | 1 |
| Mina the Headhunter | | 1 |
| Mana the Headhunter | Myra Singleton | 1, 2 |
| Mountain Fiji | Emily Dole | 1–4 |
| Nature Boy | Tony Cimber | 1 |
| Ninotchka | Lori Weathers | 1–5 |
| Olympia | Debbie Pavlica | 1 |
| Palestina | Janeen Jewett | 1, 2 |
| Pepper | Cynthia Peretti | 1 |
| Princess of Darkness | Janet Bowers, Ursula Hayden | 1, 2 |
| Queenie | Cindy Bromley | 4 |
| Roxy Astor | Tracee Meltzer | 3–5 |
| The Royal Hawaiian | April Hom | 1 |
| Sally The Farmer's Daughter | Beckie Mullen | 1, 3 |
| Salt | Charli Haynes | 1 |
| Scarlet the Southern Belle | Janice Flynn | 1 |
| Shannon Obrien | Tresha Bowers | Unaired Episodes |
| Sneaky | Unknown | 3, 4 |
| The Soul Patrol, Envy and Adore | Carmen "Envy" Campbell, Sharon "Adore" Lacey | 1, 2 |
| Spanish Red | Ericka Marr/Martinez | 1, 2 |
| Star | Suzanne Duplessis | 3, 4 |
| Stinky | Michelle Javas | 3, 4 |
| Sunny | Patricia Summerland | 3 |
| Susie Spirit | Laurie Thompson | 1, 2 |
| Tammy Jones | Debbie D'Amato | 1 |
| Tara the Southern Belle | Sheila Best | 1, 2 |
| Thunderbolt | Dana Felton Howard | 3 |
| Tiffany Mellon | Sandra Margot Escott | 3–5 |
| Tina Ferrari | Lisa Moretti | 1, 2 |
| Tulsa | Jody Haselbarth | 2 (interim), 3, 4 |
| Vicky Victory | Peach Janae | 3, 4 |
| Vine | Janet Bowers | 1–3 |
| The Widow | Nancy Daly | 4 |
| Zelda The Brain | Marie Moore | 3, 5 |

== Championships ==
=== GLOW Championship ===
Key
| No. | Overall reign number |
| Reign | Reign number for the specific champion |
| Days | Number of days held |

| No. | Champion | Championship change | | | Reign statistics | | Notes | Ref. |
| No. | Champion | Date | Event | Location | Reign | Days | Notes | Ref. |
|---|---|---|---|---|---|---|---|---|
| 1 | Tammy Jones | December 5, 1985 | GLOW: Gorgeous Ladies of Wrestling | Las Vegas, NV | 1 | 58 | Jones defeated Matilda the Hun to become the inaugural Champion. Aired on tape delay on September 13, 1986. | |
| 2 | The Royal Hawaiian | February 1, 1986 | GLOW: Gorgeous Ladies of Wrestling | Las Vegas, NV | 1 | 120 | | |
| 3 | Americana | June 1, 1986 | GLOW: Gorgeous Ladies of Wrestling | Las Vegas, NV | 1 | (Note: The length of the reign is too uncertain to calculate.) | | |
| — | Vacated | December 1986 | GLOW: Gorgeous Ladies of Wrestling | Las Vegas, NV | — | — | The championship was held up when a match between Americana and Col. Ninotchka ended in controversy. | |
| 4 | Tina Ferrari | May 15, 1987 | GLOW: Gorgeous Ladies of Wrestling | Las Vegas, NV | 1 | | Ferrari defeated Col. Ninotchka to win the vacant championship | |
| 5 | Col. Ninotchka | December 1987 | GLOW: Gorgeous Ladies of Wrestling | Las Vegas, NV | 1 | | | |
| — | Vacated | N/A | GLOW: Gorgeous Ladies of Wrestling | Las Vegas, NV | — | — | Col. Ninotchka forfeited the championship due to "defecting" to the U.S. following a confrontation with tag team partner Major Tanya. | |
| 6 | Cheyenne Cher | December 1988 | GLOW: Gorgeous Ladies of Wrestling | Las Vegas, NV | 1 | | Cher defeated Godiva in a tournament final to win the vacant championship. | |
| 7 | Daisy | December 1989 | GLOW: Gorgeous Ladies of Wrestling | Las Vegas, NV | 1 | | This episode aired on tape delay on May 26, 1990. | |
| — | Deactivated | 1990 | — | — | — | — | The championship was deactivated with the closing of GLOW. | |

=== GLOW Tag Team Championship ===
Key
| No. | Overall reign number |
| Reign | Reign number for the specific team—reign numbers for the individuals are in parentheses, if different |
| Days | Number of days held |

| No. | Champion | Championship change | | | Reign statistics | | Notes | Ref. |
| No. | Champion | Date | Event | Location | Reign | Days | Notes | Ref. |
|---|---|---|---|---|---|---|---|---|
| 1 | The Beverly Hills Girls (Ashley Cartier and Tina Ferrari) | December 5, 1985 | GLOW: Gorgeous Ladies of Wrestling | Las Vegas, NV | 1 | | Defeated Hollywood & Vine in a tournament final. Aired on tape delay on September 13, 1986. | |
| 2 | Hollywood and Vine | N/A | GLOW: Gorgeous Ladies of Wrestling | Las Vegas, NV | 1 | | | |
| — | Deactivated | 1989 | — | — | — | — | Decommissioned after Vine left the promotion. | |
