= Cynthia Peretti =

American actress and professional wrestler (1948 – 2009)

Personal information
- Born: June 2, 1948 Chicago, Illinois, U.S.
- Died: May 8, 2009 (aged 60) Chicago, Illinois

Professional wrestling career
- Ring name: Princess Jasmine; Pepper
- Billed height: 5 ft 8 in (173 cm)
- Billed weight: 142 lb (64 kg)
- Billed from: Chicago, Illinois
- Trained by: Prince Pullins; Dick the Bruiser
- Debut: 1968
- Retired: 1987

Cynthia Peretti (June 2, 1948 – May 8, 2009) was an American professional wrestler and trainer, better known by her ring name Princess Jasmine.

== Professional wrestling career ==
In 1968, Peretti was trained by professional wrestlers Prince Pullins and Dick the Bruiser. Under the ring name "Princess Jasmine", she wrestled primarily in the midwest region of the United States, but also competed in the southeast, Canada, Japan, the Philippines, the Caribbean, Africa, Korea, and the Middle East throughout the 1970s and 1980s.

Peretti was a trainer for David McLane's Gorgeous Ladies of Wrestling promotion. She appeared as an on-screen character during the promotion's first set of television tapings, where she competed under the ring name "Pepper" and worked as the tag team partner of Salt (portrayed by Charli "Golden Cat" Haynes).

After leaving GLOW, Peretti joined the American Wrestling Association and become a top contender for the AWA World Women's Championship, which was held by Sherri Martel. She also competed in tag team matches with former champion Candi Devine against the Daughters of Darkness (Luna Vachon and The Lock). During this time, she also worked for McLane's new Powerful Women of Wrestling organization.

In 1987, Peretti briefly appeared in the World Wrestling Federation and challenged Martel for the WWF Women's Championship.

== Acting career ==
After retiring from professional wrestling, Peretti became involved in films. She appeared as an extra in Chain Reaction, U.S. Marshalls, My Best Friend’s Wedding, and Love Jones.

== Personal life ==
While working as a film extra, Peretti maintained a job in shipping and receiving at Ford Motor Company.

Peretti had cancer for some time and died on May 8, 2009.

== Legacy ==
In 2013, WOW – Women of Wrestling created the 'Princess Jasmine Trailblazer Award' in honor of Peretti's life and contributions to the professional wrestling business. The inaugural recipient of the award was Peggy Lee Leather (known in WOW as 'Thug').

== Championships and accomplishments ==
- Cauliflower Alley Club
  - Ladies Wrestling Award (2009)
