= Mountain Fiji =

American athlete, actress and professional wrestler (1957 – 2018)

Personal information
- Born: September 28, 1957 Downey, California, U.S.
- Died: January 2, 2018 (aged 60)

Professional wrestling career
- Ring name: Mountain Fiji
- Billed height: 5 ft 11 in (180 cm)
- Billed weight: 350 lb (159 kg)
- Billed from: American Samoa
- Trained by: Mando Guerrero
- Debut: 1985
- Retired: 1989

Emily Leona Dole (September 28, 1957 – January 2, 2018) was an American athlete, actress and professional wrestler. She is best known for her appearances with Gorgeous Ladies of Wrestling under the ring name Mountain Fiji (abbreviated in publications and her official logo as Mt. Fiji).

== Track and field career ==
A 1976 graduate of Cypress High School, Dole threw the shot put at 50 ft 6 in (15.39 m). This won Emily two Amateur Athletic Union (AAU) awards in 1975: number two distance in the U.S.A. for the Women's Division and number one distance in the U.S.A. for the Junior Division. Until 2000, only two other California high school girls had achieved that feat. Dole competed in the AIAW for the Long Beach State Beach track and field team, placing 6th at the 1977 AIAW Outdoor Track and Field Championships. She qualified for two Olympic Trials, finishing fifth in 1976 and seventh in 1980. Both Trials were won by Maren Seidler during her 4 Trials winning streak. Dole joined Seidler and several other elite athletes of the period in playing supporting roles in the film Personal Best starring Mariel Hemingway and Scott Glenn (1982).

== Professional wrestling career ==
In 1985, as Mt. Fiji occasionally elongated to Mountain Fiji, she was part of the original cast of the Gorgeous Ladies of Wrestling. At 350 pounds, she dwarfed all of the other members of the cast, the closest competitor being the glamazon queen Matilda the Hun, who she feuded with for the first two seasons. During those first two seasons she was also given a kayfabe little sister, Little Fiji, who as one of the smallest members of the cast always needed rescuing. For the third and fourth seasons she was given a new nemesis, Big Bad Mama. There were many gimmick matches and handicap situations, to the extreme of Fiji being chained to the ringpost. Throughout her run with the promotion, she never lost a match. It was a notable event if she was knocked off her feet.

Wrestling led to other appearances on the Hard Time on Planet Earth, Mama's Family and Son in Law. She also appeared in an audience polling group with nine other female wrestlers on the CBS daytime version of Card Sharks in 1988 and picked up host Bob Eubanks.

== Bridal shower incident ==
Toward the end of the series, while segments of "Life in the GLOW House" were being shot for season four, Dole's family was involved in an incident with the Los Angeles County Sheriff's Department on February 11, 1989. The incident involved an overwhelming force of sheriffs in riot gear invading the family home in Cerritos, California during a bridal shower for Dole's sister, Melinda. Much like the Rodney King incident two years later, the event was videotaped by a neighbor, Doug Botts, showing the police beating 36 members of the family. After being a TV celebrity for three years on National TV, the massive Dole took a passive stance, arms folded in the middle of the street, where the video showed her being beaten to the ground with police batons and flashlights. The 36 members of the party, all Samoan, were beaten and arrested. The Samoan-American community was angered, contending the incident was racist in nature. The family represented by Garo Mardirossian sued the Sheriff's Department and won a $24,850,000 jury verdict with interest. The legal process included taking the depositions of Sheriff Sherman Block and over 50 deputies. In response, Dole said, "Thank God it's over with. This goes to show that in the United States of America, justice does prevail. Nine years is a long, long time. We can forgive, but we cannot forget."

== Later life ==
Dole had many health problems over the years, basically due to illnesses related to her extreme obesity, and had been staying in an assisted living facility. In 2008 Dole weighed 425 pounds, but later weighed 235 pounds.

Emily Dole was interviewed and featured in the 2012 documentary film GLOW: The Story of the Gorgeous Ladies of Wrestling.

On January 2, 2018, she died at the age of 60 after years of health issues. The exact cause of her death was never revealed.

== Filmography ==
Year	Title	Role	Notes
1982	Personal Best	Maureen	
1986–1989	Gorgeous Ladies of Wrestling	Mountain Fiji	104 Episodes
1987	Mama's Family	Masked Mabel #2	Episode: "Mama Mania"
1989	Hard Time on Planet Earth	Mountain Fiji	Episode: "The Hot Dog Man"
1990	Family Feud	Mountain Fiji (contestant)	Episode: "Wrestlers Family Feud Special III"
1991	GLOW: Gorgeous Ladies of Wrestling: Canvas Carnage	Mountain Fiji	
1993	Son in Law	Thumper	
2003	G.L.O.W. Vol. 1	Mountain Fiji	
2003	G.L.O.W. Vol. 2: The Saga Continues	Mountain Fiji	
2003	G.L.O.W. Vol. 3: Fans Beware...Anything Goes!	Mountain Fiji	
2006	The Very Best of GLOW: Gorgeous Ladies of Wrestling: Vol. 1	Mountain Fiji	
2006	The Very Best of GLOW: Gorgeous Ladies of Wrestling: Vol. 2	Mountain Fiji	
2007	The Very Best of GLOW: Gorgeous Ladies of Wrestling: Vol. 3	Mountain Fiji	
2008	GLOW: Greatest TV Moments	Mountain Fiji	
2012	GLOW: The Story of the Gorgeous Ladies of Wrestling	Mountain Fiji	Final film appearance
