= Powerful Women of Wrestling =

Wrestling promotion

- Acronym: POWW
- Founded: 1987
- Defunct: 1990
- Style: Women's professional wrestling
- Headquarters: Indianapolis, Indiana (1987-1990)
- Founder: David McLane
- Owner: David McLane (1987-1990)
- Sister: World Wrestling Association
- Predecessor: Gorgeous Ladies of Wrestling
- Successor: Women of Wrestling

Powerful Women of Wrestling (also known as POWW) was a women's professional wrestling promotion based out of Indianapolis, Indiana founded by David McLane, founder of Gorgeous Ladies of Wrestling and Women of Wrestling.

== History ==
After David McLane left Gorgeous Ladies of Wrestling (GLOW), he returned to Indianapolis and created Powerful Women of Wrestling (POWW). Many wrestlers left GLOW due to pay disputes and joined McLane's new POWW promotion under altered ring names. Unlike GLOW (which focused on comedy, variety, and skits), POWW focused more on actual wrestling. POWW was aligned with World Wrestling Association in Indianapolis and their titles were sometimes referred to as the WWA Women's Championship and WWA Women's Tag Team Championship. They were also briefly aligned with the American Wrestling Association during 1989. That same year, many of the POWW wrestlers were featured in the 1989 film American Angels- Baptism of Blood. The promotion closed the following year in 1990.

== Alumni ==
- Bambi (Selina Majors)
- Brandi Mae (Trudy Adams) - Formerly "Amy the Farmer's Daughter" in GLOW
- Candi Devine (Candace Rummel)
- Coal Miner's Daughter (Donna Spangler)
- Danya
- Destiny
- Devila
- Essence - Formerly "Envy" in GLOW
- Futura (Kathleen Blair)
- Genie Beret / Jeanie Beret (Laura Fisher) - Formerly "Attache" in GLOW
- Goldie Rae (Ursula Hayden) - Formerly "Babe the Farmers Daughter" in GLOW
- Heidi Lee Morgan
- Hot Rod Andie - Formerly "Angel" in GLOW
- Insanity - Formerly "Dementia" in GLOW
- Katie Kincaid
- Kimmie Kozak
- Lady Soul/Essence - Formerly "Envy" in Glow
- Liberty (Susan Phelan)
- Lock (Winona Barkley)
- Luna Vachon (Gertrude Vachon)
- Madusa Miceli (Debra Miceli)
- Malibu (Jane Hamlin) - Formerly "California Doll" in GLOW
- Natasha the Russian (Noelle Rose) - Also "Major Tanya" in GLOW
- Nina (Lisa Moretti) - Formerly "Tina Ferrari" in GLOW
- Orient Express: Shanghai and Ninjia
- Paisley
- Passion
- Peggy Lee Leather
- Pocahontas
- Polynesian Princess
- Princess Jasmine (Cynthia Peretti) - Formerly "Pepper" in GLOW
- Queen Kong (Dee Booher) - Formerly "Matilda the Hun" in GLOW
- Rockin' Rebel (Robin Kelly)
- Sasha the Russian (Michelle Duze) - Formerly "Dementia" & "Sugar" in GLOW
- Shannon O'Brien
- Spanish Fury
- Susie Steele
- 'The Syrian Terrorist' Pali Al-Azar Rashan Yerovich (Janeen Jewett) - Formerly "Palestina" in GLOW
- Thora the Barbarian (Ann Marie Cosgrove)
- Tiffany Crystal (Natalie Will)
- Wendi Richter

== Championships ==
=== POWW Championship ===
Natasha the Russian was the first POWW Champion. She lost the title on the second TV episode. Nina was the second POWW Champion. She lost the title to Sasha the Russian, but later regained it. The title was also referred to as the WWA Women's Championship.

==== Belt design ====
Initially, the title was a crown worn by the champion and was referred to as the "POWW Crown". Eventually the crown was replaced by a white sash belt with metal studs spelling the words "POWW Champion" fastened on the sash.

=== POWW Tag Team Championship ===
Luna Vachon and Hot Rod Andie defeated The Blonde Bombshells (Brandi Mae and Malibu) to become the first POWW Tag Team Champions. The titles were also referred to as the WWA Women's Tag Team Championship..
