= Meshulam Riklis =

Israeli-American financier and businessman (1923–2019)

- משולם ריקליס
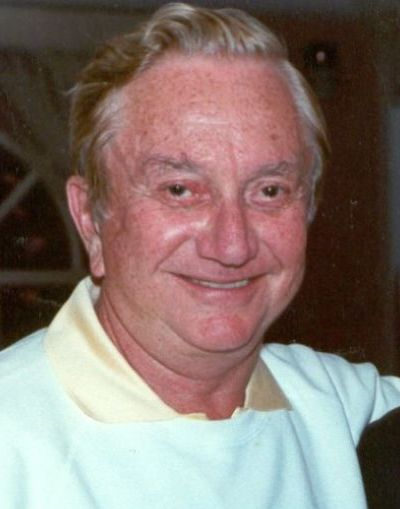
- Riklis in 1988
- Born: 2 December 1923; Istanbul, Turkey
- Died: 25 January 2019 (aged 95); Tel Aviv, Israel
- Occupations: Financier; businessman
- Spouses: Judith Stern (divorced) Pia Zadora (m. 1977; div. 1993) Tali Sinai (m. 2010)
- Children: 5

Meshulam Riklis (Hebrew: משולם ריקליס; 2 December 1923 – 25 January 2019) was an Israeli financier and businessman.

== Early years ==
Born in Istanbul to a Russian-Jewish family, Riklis grew up in Tel Aviv, and attended the Herzliya Hebrew Gymnasium high school; before coming to the United States in 1947 with his first wife, Judith Stern, with whom he had three children. He studied mathematics at Ohio State University, graduating in 1950. His first significant job was as a junior stock analyst for the Minneapolis investment firm Piper Jaffray.

== Business career ==
Riklis is credited with having originated complicated paper transactions like high-yield bonds and leveraged buyouts to take over control of major companies, then doing paper switches of the assets into companies he owned. His first significant foray was the creation in 1966 of the Rapid-American Corporation by combining his significant stake in Rapid Electrotype Company, a platemaking concern with the American Colortype Company, a maker of stereoview lithographs and dollhouse furniture. Tracing the history of Rapid American Corporation and its renamed form Glen Alden Corporation, one can find the succession of acquisitions Riklis used to create his financial empire, including; McCrory Stores, Leeds Travelware, Gruen Watch Company, Elizabeth Arden cosmetics, Aunt Nellie's Farm Kitchens, Bargain Time, Beatrice Foods, Canadian retailer Dylex, Culligan International, Fabergé Cosmetics, J. J. Newberry stores, Lerner Shops, Lawry's Meat Specialties, Martha White Foods, Odd Lot Trading, International Playtex, the Riviera hotel and casino in Las Vegas, RKO-Stanley Warner Theatres, Samsonite, and Schenley Industries, the one-time American distributor of Dewar's whisky.

After his financial empire was well established, he returned to Ohio State to complete his master's degree in Finance. His degree thesis, titled "Expansion through Financial Management" and based on his career, discussed "the effective use, or rather non-use, of cash." At the height of his financial success, he claimed in an interview with the Los Angeles Times to have had a reported net worth of a "billion dollars."

One of the many shells and holding companies he bought in the process of building the empire was E-II Holdings, in which the other investors later discovered he had placed the names of impressive companies, but not the assets. Among the investors in E-II was Carl Icahn. These investors revolted against Riklis and started seizing other properties in the financial empire.

Many of the corporations declared bankruptcy, again carefully maneuvered by Riklis to preserve his personal wealth. He famously sold his stake in the Carnival Cruise Line to Ted Arison for US$1 (while the company was US$5 million in debt). In the early 1980s, he hired Jeffrey Silver and then Boston accountant, Arthur Waltzman, to take over as CEO of his then struggling Vegas landmark Riviera Hotel and Casino and rescue it from Chapter 11 bankruptcy. He also brought on board 25-year Playboy Enterprises executive, Sam Distefano to head the resort's entertainment department and personally hire its celebrity headliners for over eleven years.

Forbes Magazine reported that while at the helm of a string of his companies, Riklis left his creditors unpaid for over US$2.9 billion in debt. According to Forbes, less than 10% of this had been recovered as of 2007. In March 2013, Riklis filed for bankruptcy protection for Rapid-American Corp because of asbestos related personal injury claims brought against Rapid American through their subsidiary Philip Carey Manufacturing.

== Personal life ==
After divorcing his first wife, the 53-year-old Riklis was married to the then 23-year-old Pia Zadora on 18 September 1977. They had two children, Kady and Kristofer.

Riklis then financed the movie Butterfly, starring Zadora. Her acting in the film was lampooned by comedians and critics alike, winning her the Razzie Award for Worst Actress, but she somehow won the Golden Globe Award as New Star of the Year after a well publicized press junket paid for by Riklis, also hosted at his own Riviera Hotel. He financed two more films with Zadora; all three movies have become known as camp classics.

Riklis and Zadora then bought and demolished one of Beverly Hills' best known landmarks, Pickfair Manor, the former home of silent movie legends Douglas Fairbanks and Mary Pickford, to build a larger home on the site. They lived there until their divorce in 1993.

In 2010, aged 86, Riklis married his third wife, Tali Sinai, who was almost 40 years his junior. In 2012, his daughter Simona, known professionally as advice columnist Mona Ackerman, predeceased her father, dying from cancer at age 66. Meshulam died in Tel Aviv on 25 January 2019, aged 95.

== Philanthropy ==
The philanthropic ventures of Meshulam Riklis included Beit Riklis in Jerusalem, which closed in 2009.
