= Kevin Costner filmography =

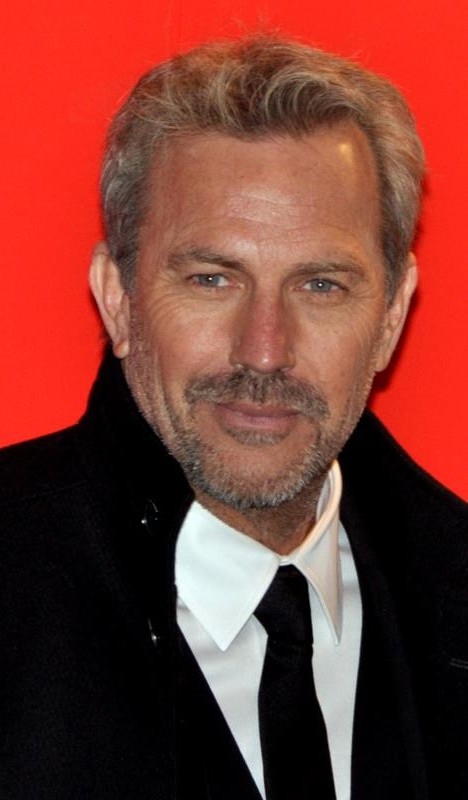
Costner in 2013

American actor, director, and producer Kevin Costner started his acting career in 1981 by starring in the romantic comedy independent film Sizzle Beach, U.S.A. He went on to appear in the films Testament (1983), and Shadows Run Black (1984) before co-starring in the 1985 ensemble western film Silverado alongside Kevin Kline, Scott Glenn, and Danny Glover. The same year, he starred in the comedy film Fandango with Judd Nelson, as well as American Flyers with David Marshall Grant. In 1987, Costner starred as Eliot Ness in the crime film The Untouchables with Robert De Niro and Sean Connery. In 1988, he played Crash Davis in the romantic comedy sports film Bull Durham with Susan Sarandon and Tim Robbins. The film is on AFI's 10 Top 10 for Greatest Sports Movies. Costner then starred in the sports fantasy drama film Field of Dreams with James Earl Jones. The film received generally positive reviews from critics, and was nominated for three Academy Awards: Best Picture, Best Original Score, and Best Adapted Screenplay. In 2017, it was selected for preservation in the United States National Film Registry by the Library of Congress as "culturally, historically, or aesthetically significant". It is also on AFI's 10 Top 10 for Greatest Fantasy Movies.

In the 1990s, Costner starred in numerous films including the 1990 epic Western film Dances With Wolves as Lieutenant John J. Dunbar, which he also directed and produced. The film received 12 Academy Awards nominations with Costner winning Best Picture, Best Director and was nominated for Best Actor. He also starred as: Robin Hood in Robin Hood: Prince of Thieves with Morgan Freeman (1991), The Bodyguard with Whitney Houston (1992), Wyatt Earp with Dennis Quaid (1994), Tin Cup with Rene Russo (1996), The Postman with Will Patton (1997), Message in a Bottle with Robin Wright (1999) and For Love of the Game with Kelly Preston (also 1999). In the 2000s, he co-starred in the heist black action comedy film 3000 Miles to Graceland with Kurt Russell (2001), the Revisionist Western film Open Range with Robert Duvall (2003), Rob Reiner's romantic comedy film Rumor Has It with Jennifer Aniston (2005), psychological thriller film Mr. Brooks with Demi Moore (2007), and the comedy-drama film Swing Vote with Kelsey Grammer (2008).

He was cast as Jonathan Kent in Zack Snyder's 2013 superhero film Man of Steel, based on the DC Comics character Superman. In 2014, he co-starred in the films: Jack Ryan: Shadow Recruit with Chris Pine, 3 Days to Kill with Amber Heard, and Draft Day with Jennifer Garner. For his role in the 2016 biographical drama film Hidden Figures, Costner and the cast won the Screen Actors Guild Award for Outstanding Performance by a Cast in a Motion Picture. He played Jessica Chastain's father in the 2017 biographical crime drama film Molly's Game and he portrayed lawman and Texas Ranger Frank Hamer in the 2019 period crime thriller film The Highwaymen opposite Woody Harrelson. In 2024, he directed the Westerns Horizon: An American Saga.

Costner's television work includes playing Devil Anse Hatfield in the three-part Western television miniseries Hatfields & McCoys, and from 2018 to 2024, he was the lead, John Dutton, on the Western series Yellowstone.

== Film ==
Year	Title	Role	Notes	Ref.
1981	Sizzle Beach, U.S.A.	John Logan		
1982	Chasing Dreams	Ed		
1982	Night Shift	Frat Boy #1		
1982	Frances	Luther Adler	Uncredited	
1983	Stacy's Knights	Will Bonner		
1983	Table for Five	Newlywed Husband		
1983	Testament	Phil Pitkin		
1983	The Big Chill	Alex Marshall	Uncredited	
1984	Shadows Run Black	Jimmy Scott		
1985	Fandango	Gardner Barnes		
1985	Silverado	Jake		
1985	American Flyers	Marcus Sommers		
1987	The Untouchables	Treasury Agent Eliot Ness		
1987	No Way Out	Lieutenant Commander Tom Farrell		
1988	Bull Durham	Crash Davis		
1989	Field of Dreams	Ray Kinsella		
1989	The Gunrunner	Ted Beaubien		
1990	Revenge	Michael "Jay" Cochran	Also producer	
1990	Dances With Wolves	Lieutenant John J. Dunbar	Also director and producer	
1991	Madonna: Truth or Dare	Himself	Documentary	
1991	Robin Hood: Prince of Thieves	Robin Hood	Also producer	
1991	JFK	District Attorney Jim Garrison		
1992	The Bodyguard	Frank Farmer	Also producer	
1993	A Perfect World	Robert "Butch" Haynes		
1994	A Century of Cinema	Himself	Documentary	
1994	Wyatt Earp	Wyatt Earp	Also producer	
1994	The War	Stephen Simmons		
1995	Waterworld	Mariner	Also producer	
1996	Tin Cup	Roy "Tin Cup" McAvoy		
1997	Sean Connery: An Intimate Portrait	Himself	Documentary	
1997	The Postman	The Postman	Also director and producer	
1999	Message in a Bottle	Garret Blake	Also producer	
1999	For Love of the Game	Billy Chapel		
1999	Play It to the Bone	Ringside Fan		
2000	Thirteen Days	Kenny O'Donnell	Also producer	
2001	3,000 Miles to Graceland	Thomas J. Murphy		
2002	Dragonfly	Joe Darrow		
2003	Open Range	Charley Waite / Charles Travis Postelwaite	Also director and producer	
2005	The Upside of Anger	Denny Davies		
2005	Rumor Has It	Beau Burroughs		
2006	The Guardian	Ben Randall		
2007	Mr. Brooks	Mr. Earl Brooks	Also producer	
2008	Swing Vote	Bud Johnson	Also producer	
2009	The New Daughter	John James		
2010	The Company Men	Jack Dolan		
2011	Field of Dreams 2: Lockout	lowa Farmer's Dad	Short film	
2013	Man of Steel	Jonathan Kent		
2014	Jack Ryan: Shadow Recruit	U.S. Navy Commander Thomas Harper		
2014	3 Days to Kill	Ethan Renner		
2014	Draft Day	Sonny Weaver Jr.		
2014	The Man Who Saved the World	Himself	Documentary	
2014	Black or White	Elliot Anderson	Also producer	
2014	Hollywood Banker	Himself	Documentary	
2015	McFarland, USA	Coach Jim White		
2015	Fastball	Narrator	Documentary	
2016	Batman v Superman: Dawn of Justice	Jonathan Kent	Cameo appearance	
2016	Criminal	Jericho Stewart		
2016	Hidden Figures	Al Harrison		
2017	Molly's Game	Larry Bloom		
2018	Whitney	Himself	Documentary	
2019	The Highwaymen	Frank Hamer		
2019	The Art of Racing in the Rain	Enzo (voice)		
2020	Let Him Go	George Blackledge	Also producer	
2021	Zack Snyder's Justice League	Jonathan Kent		
2024	Horizon: An American Saga – Chapter 1	Hayes Ellison	Also director, producer and writer	
2024	Horizon: An American Saga – Chapter 2	Hayes Ellison	Also director, producer and writer	
TBA	Honeymoon with Harry †	Harry	Post-production	

Key
†	Denotes films that have not yet been released

== Television ==
Year	Title	Role	Notes	Ref.
1985	Amazing Stories	Captain	Episode: "The Mission"	
1990	The Earth Day Special	Bartender	Special	
1992	Oliver Stone: Inside Out	Himself	Television film	
1992	Beyond 'JFK': The Question of Conspiracy	Himself	Documentary film	
1995	500 Nations	Presenter & Host	8-part documentary	
2012	Hatfields & McCoys	Devil Anse Hatfield	Miniseries; also producer	
2015	Billy the Kid: New Evidence	Narrator	TV documentary	
2018–2024	Yellowstone	John Dutton	Main role; also executive producer	
2025	Kevin Costner Presents: The First Christmas	Host	Also executive producer	
2025	Kevin Costner's the West	Narrator	Miniseries; also executive producer	

== Producer ==
List of film and television credits as producer
Year	Title	Notes	Ref.
1990	Revenge	Executive producer	
1990	Dances With Wolves		
1991	Robin Hood: Prince of Thieves	Uncredited producer	
1992	The Bodyguard		
1994	Rapa Nui		
1994	Wyatt Earp		
1995	Waterworld		
1997	The Postman		
1999	Message in a Bottle		
2000	Thirteen Days		
2003	Open Range		
2007	Mr. Brooks		
2008	Swing Vote		
2012	Hatfields & McCoys		
2014	Black or White		
2018	Yellowstone	Executive producer	
2020	Let Him Go	Executive producer	
2024	Horizon: An American Saga – Chapter 1		
2024	Horizon: An American Saga – Chapter 2	Post-production	
TBA	Horizon: An American Saga – Chapter 3	Post-production	
