= Killer Tomato =

American professional wrestler and actress

Debi Pelletier
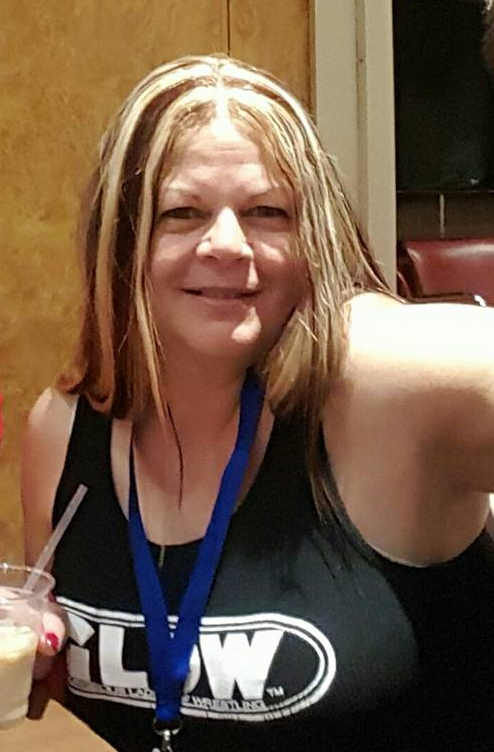
- Debi Pelletier, who wrestled as Dallas for GLOW

Personal information
- Born: c. 1959 California, United States

Professional wrestling career
- Ring name(s): Dallas; Debi the Killer Tomato; Killer Tomato
- Billed height: 5 ft 9 in (175 cm)
- Billed weight: 130 lb (59 kg)
- Billed from: Los Angeles, California
- Trained by: Jay York
- Debut: 1983

Debi Pelletier is an American retired professional wrestler, better known by her ring name, Killer Tomato.

== Professional wrestling career ==
=== Early career (1983–1986) ===
In 1983, Pelletier debuted as a professional wrestler using the ring name "Killer Tomato". In her first match, she substituted for another female wrestler at a wrestling event held at the Olympic Auditorium.

=== Gorgeous Ladies of Wrestling (1986) ===
Pelletier joined David McLane's Gorgeous Ladies of Wrestling promotion in 1986. She appeared as an on-screen character under the ring name "Dallas". Her character was similar to a Dallas Cowboys Cheerleader. She appeared during the first season.

=== American Wrestling Association (1986) ===
After leaving GLOW, Pelletier joined the American Wrestling Association in 1986 under her Killer Tomato ring name and became a top contender for the AWA World Women's Championship, which was held by Sherri Martel. She also feuded with Martel in the California Championship Wrestling promotion in 1986.

== Acting career ==
In 1985, Pelleitier appeared in Grunt! The Wrestling Movie. Pelletier also appeared in the movie The Bad Guys. She had a speaking role in the TV series Hardcastle and McCormick. In 2018, she starred on stage in AfterGLOW: The 80s Musical Experience with some of the original GLOW wrestlers: Matilda The Hun (Dee Booher), Roxy Astor (Tracee Meltzer), MTV (Eileen O’Hara), and Sunny the California Girl (Patricia Summerland). In 2020, the show was nominated for 8 Broadway World Awards of the Decade and subsequently won 2 awards: Best Ensemble of the Decade and Director of a Musical of the Decade.

== Championships and accomplishments ==
- Cauliflower Alley Club
  - Women's Wrestling (Retired) Award (2014)
