= Fortress of Amerikkka =

- DVD cover
- Directed by: Eric Louzil
- Written by: Eric Louzil
- Produced by: Lloyd Kaufman; Michael Herz
- Starring: Gene LeBrock; Kellee Bradley; David Crane; William J. Kulzer; Karen Michaels; Douglas C. Fox; Scot Perlstein
- Cinematography: Ron Chapman
- Edited by: Diane Robinson
- Music by: Dave Ouimet
- Distributed by: Troma Entertainment
- Release date: August 1989
- Running time: 100 minutes
- Country: United States
- Language: English

Fortress of Amerikkka is a 1989 American action film directed by Eric Louzil and distributed by Troma Entertainment.

== Premise ==
The film follows John Whitecloud, a criminal rebel who seeks revenge against a corrupt Sheriff and a militia run by a crazed general.

== Cast ==
- Gene LeBrock
- Kellee Bradley
- David Crane
- William J. Kulzer
- Karen Michaels
- Douglas C. Fox
- Scot Perlstein

== Production ==
The production is presented as an attempt to deal with political topics with which Troma was not generally associated. Lloyd Kaufman said about the film that "It was about a futuristic society where everyone in the world hates America. What a preposterous idea that is! "

== Release ==
The film was theatrically released as Fortress of Amerikkka: The Mercenaries. Troma released a VHS and then DVD version of much disputed quality (respectively qualified as "borderline unwatchable" and "scuzzy"). Vinegar Syndrome released a Blu-ray edition in 2022.

== Reception ==
DVD Talk said the film "would have been decent. Not great or even good, but worthy of wasting a Friday evening on. But with his movie mania in overdrive and his head in a geo-political treatise instead of a story of vicious, villainous vice, Louzil loses control of the chaos and his film crashes and burns." Another recent review contains a similar assessment of the film: "Fortress of Amerikkka initially presents itself as a considered understanding of divisiveness and American values, offering an introduction that details the central crisis between those who choose to live in the country and those who seek to control it under the guise of patriotism. There's a moment when the feature seems like a prescient look at the world we live in today, offering a brutal but accurate understanding of armed wackos and the hyper-masculine, Rambo-loving world they live in. Alas, this is a Troma Entertainment production, so hope for a nuanced understanding of militia activity and thinking isn't a priority. Instead of a blistering critique of American life, writer/director Eric Louzil (Bikini Beach Race, Class of Nuke 'Em High Part II: Subhumanoid Meltdown) is out to make an exploitation movie filled with dim-witted characters, loud gunplay, and topless women. That's the basic shape of Fortress of Amerikkka, which vacillates between graphic, mean-spirited violence and goofball antics with broad performances. There's some entertainment value in the absurdity of Louzil's screenplay, but the endeavor falls short of its potential, missing a chance to give Troma a real politicized offering to help them break free of their low-budget formula."

A review in The Fayetteville Observer wrote, "Still, it's hard to imagine even the most bubble-headed fan of gratuitous violence being able to sit through the incoherent plot of "Fortress of Amerikkka," an action-adventure mishap which opened today at the Westwood Cinema and Eutaw Movies. To list everything wrong with this poorly-written, poorly-staged venture would be difficult, not to mention exhausting. Perhaps it will suffice to say what is right: Everyone speaks English, and they all know how to look at the camera."

""Fortress Of Amerikkka," a.ka. "The Mercenaries," is an old-fashioned sexploitation film that will appeal to that fringe which enjoys truly bad acting, t&a and gore effects. Secdon Troma release from filmmaker Eric Louzil, pic is a slight step from his "Lust for Freedom," but still suffers from awkward direction and the annoying Troma practice of adding hokey dialog and sound effects to fill up dead air. ... Apart from scenic views of forests and mountains, film's technical credits are weak. The background score is extremely poor.", noted Variety.

Robert Nowlan noted, "In a weak sexploitation film, Indian halfbreed Gene LeBrok is just out of jail and hot on the trail of sheriff David Crane who cold-bloodedly killed LeBrok's brother. His crusade is complicated by a band of mercenary soldiers, the "Fortress of Amerikkka" led by William J. Kulzer, whose game is killing. The acting is horrible and even all the topless busty actresses don't help matters." while Daniel Budnidk found, "The film is maybe a little too long and some of the scenes of the partying mercenaries might have been trimmed. Or some of the more obvious scenes with the racist sheriff could have hit the road. But once the sheriff and some fat vigilantes storm the mercenaries and all hell breaks loose, it become worthwhile. Then the narration returns and one cannot figure out what the hell Troma is up to. But it's nice that they tried it. Whatever it is."
