= Lust for Freedom =

1987 film by Eric Louzil

- Directed by: Eric Louzil
- Written by: Craig Kusaba; Duke Howard; Eric Louzil
- Produced by: Eric Louzil
- Starring: Melanie Coll; William J. Kulzer; Judi Trevor; Dee Booher
- Cinematography: Ron Chapman
- Edited by: Steve Mann; Thomas R. Rondinella
- Music by: John Massari
- Production companies: Mesa Films; Troma Team
- Distributed by: Troma Team
- Release dates: May 1987 (Cannes Film Festival); February 19, 1988 (U.S. theatrical release)
- Running time: 92 minutes
- Country: United States
- Language: English
- Budget: $1.5 million

Lust for Freedom is a 1987 "women in prison" film directed, produced and co-written by Eric Louzil, and starring Melanie Coll. The film was originally shot at a cost of $50,000 in 1985, under the title of Georgia County Lock-up. In 1986, Troma Team provided $125,000 to alter the film for a theatrical release. The film premiered at the Cannes Film Festival in 1987, before premiering theatrically the following year.

== Plot ==
The film is narrated by Gillian Kaites, an undercover detective who witnesses the murder of her fiancé/partner during a drug bust that has gone wrong. Gillian takes a road trip afterwards and is kidnapped by the corrupt Georgia County police and prison force along the California-Mexico border. Gillian is framed for a crime she did not commit and is sent to a prison where other kidnapped women have been sent and are subjected to abuse. Gillian, with help from the other women, plots to escape the prison.

== Cast ==
- Melanie Coll as Gillian Kaites
- William J. Kulzer as Sheriff Coale
- Judi Trevor as Ms. Pusker
- Howard Knight as Warden Maxell
- Elizabeth Carlisle as Vicky
- Dee Booher as Edna "Big Eddie" (credited as Dee "Queen Kong" Booher)
- Michelle Bauer as Jackie

== Production ==
The Bristlecone Film Committee was formed in 1983, by citizens of Ely, Nevada, who were concerned about their struggling community after the closure of the nearby Robinson Mine. The film committee advertised Ely as an ideal filming location in film publications. Eric Louzil, the president of Mesa Productions in Los Angeles, learned of Ely's "Rent A Town" concept on an evening news show and began negotiations in 1984 to use the city as a filming location for what was then known as Georgia County Lock-up. Louzil co-wrote the film with Craig Kusaba and Duke Howard, and served as producer and director. "Women in prison" films were popular at the time of the film's production.

Filming was underway in Nevada in June 1985. A 30-member crew began filming in Ely on July 8, 1985, and continued there for a week. Filming locations in Ely included Comins Lake, Duck Creek Basin, and the local cemetery. Several Ely residents were cast in small roles, including local councilmember Carl Stanek. It was the largest production project to occur in Ely up to that point. Approximately 30 percent of the film was shot in Ely, while the remainder was shot at studios in California. At the time of filming, the film was expected to be completed for distribution by October 1, 1985, although a release date had not been set. The film had a budget of $1.5 million, and was made at a cost of $50,000.

In 1986, Louzil met Lloyd Kaufman of Troma Team. Troma provided Louzil with $125,000 to improve the film's sound, add additional scenes, and convert the footage to 35mm film for a theatrical release. By January 1987, the film had been renamed as Lust for Freedom. The film's musical score was composed by John Massari, and the soundtrack includes two songs by Grim Reaper: "Lust for Freedom" and "Rock You to Hell". Lust for Freedom was Melanie Coll's only film role.

== Release ==
The film was shown at the Cannes Film Festival in May 1987, and was later released theatrically on February 19, 1988. The film was released on video in July 1992. Louzil said, "We made a ton of money on the film, more than $2 million, because those were the days when people were buying videos and paying high prices."

== Reception ==
Caryn James of The New York Times wrote, "The worst kind of exploitation film masquerades as a spoof, luring innocent but otherwise intelligent people to the theater." James wrote that from the time Gillian arrives in the prison, "it is clear that this movie will never again cross the line from exploitation into fun. 'I knew a lot of brutality and perversion was going on in those cells, but I didn't care,' Gillian whines, and throughout the movie her helpless depression is an excuse for showing brutality and perversion, as the film makers try to mask the sadistic and sexist heart of their story."

Michael Wilmington of the Los Angeles Times called the film a "low-rent women's prison movie which gives us plenty of lust and little freedom. Shot with the elan of a TV soap opera on a bad day and packed with performances for which 'staggeringly inept' might be a mild compliment, this appalling little Troma Team release offers murder, mayhem, kidnapping, drugs, false arrest, perversion, rape, pornography, white slavery, arson, carnage—and, as if all that weren't enough, a rigged wrestling match." Wilmington wrote, "As Gillian's whacked-out narration drones on, we can sense discontent brewing among her fellow inmates. Soon, the prison populace explodes into revolt, overwhelmed by the lust for freedom—or perhaps just sick of hearing the same two Grim Reaper songs repeated endlessly on the sound track." Wilmington wrote that the film "has one thing going for it: It looks as though it cost almost nothing to make. That's a relief. Even if this movie is abysmal, at least it doesn't look profligate."

Lou Lumenick of The Record wrote, "While this may not actually be the case, 'Lust for Freedom' looks as if its creators started out making a hard-core porno film and switched midway to a soft-core, women's prison picture. If there were any criteria for casting most of the women other than their willingness to take off their clothes, it isn't apparent in the final product, which is unprofessional even by the standards of the Troma Team, whose last effort was 'Surf Nazis Must Die.' When the women prisoners aren't parading in halter, shorts, and heavy makeup, they are as consistently overexposed in the endless shower and lesbian scenes as the movie's photography is underexposed." Lumenick wrote that although Coll does not appear nude in any scenes, "the moronic script abundantly makes up for that with other humiliations such as encounters with crazed lady wrestlers and psychotic Indians. Kevin Costner's career may have survived Eric Louzil's direction in 'Sizzle Beach, U.S.A.,' but it's doubtful Coll will be able to say the same."

In 2005, Christopher Curry of Film Threat gave the film two and a half stars out of five and called it a "by-the-books women in prison movie". Curry stated that like many Troma films, Lust for Freedom "is steeped in amateurish acting, erratic pacing and, just to keep the action moving along, massive plot holes. Marry all this with a snuff film subplot and a soundtrack by British Heavy Metal act Grim Reaper and you have one nasty little film."

The following year, Bill Gibron of PopMatters wrote, "You only need three words to understand why Lust for Freedom is such a fantastic freak-out of a film: three simple pieces of the English language that say so very much while remaining so basic and pure. Trapped within their vowels and consonants are the tone, the timbre, and the type of cinematic sensation you're in for. And what is this lexis of lunacy, you ask—this triumvirate of telltale phonics? Why, women in prison, of course." Gibron noted the poor acting, but wrote that the film "is so ripe with seedy shenanigans and despicable ideas that makers of autopsy porn look down on its delicious tawdriness. [...] this is one exploitation gambol that takes the tired conventions of the jailbird genre and pumps them full of radioactive iniquity." Gibron concluded that Lust for Freedom "makes you understand instantly why films of this genre—namely gals in gulags—are so cotton-picking pleasing."

In 2010, Mark Burger of Yes! Weekly gave the film zero stars and described it as a "low-rent" film, writing, "The laughs are unintentional and frequent [...]. Entertaining in spite of itself, with Coll's incongruous narration and a hilarious, head-banging soundtrack by Grim Reaper among the proverbial 'highlights.' Laughable trash in the best (and worst) Troma tradition."
