= Eric Louzil =

American film director

- Born: September 1, 1952 (age 73)
- Occupations: • Film director • Film producer

Eric Louzil (born September 1, 1952) is an American low-budget film director, writer and producer.

== Career ==
Louzil began his career as a UCLA film student, when he served as associate producer of the short film Sonic Boom starring Ricky Nelson, George Kennedy, Sal Mineo and Keith Moon in 1975. He soon made a career for himself as a low-budget producer and later director, most notably for infamous independent film company Troma. His early productions Sizzle Beach, U.S.A. (aka Malibu Hot Summer) and Shadows Run Black are notable as the first two films to feature film star Kevin Costner. Louzil also directed the 1987 film, Lust for Freedom.

His other credits include the action film Fortress of Amerikkka (1989), Bikini Beach Race (1992), Class of Nuke 'Em High 2: Subhumanoid Meltdown (1991), and Class of Nuke 'Em High 3: The Good, the Bad and the Subhumanoid (1994) (in which he also plays a role), both a part of the Class of Nuke 'Em High film series. Louzil was noted for having been among the independent filmmakers who gravitated to Yuma, Arizona, in the late 1980s and early 1990s.
