= List of awards and nominations received by Kevin Costner =

Kevin Costner awards and nominations
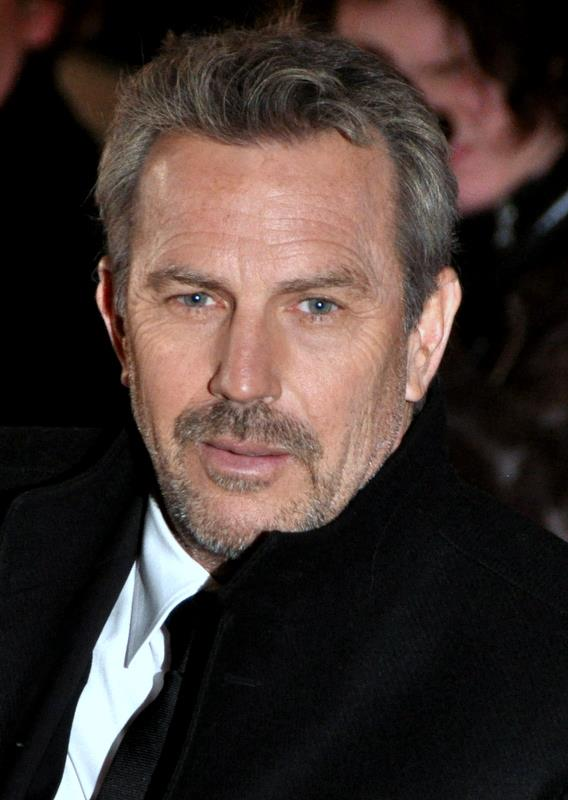
- Costner in 2013
Awards and nominations
Award	Wins	Nominations
Actor Award	2	3
Academy Awards	2	3
BAFTA Awards	0	3
Critics' Choice	0	2
Emmy Awards	1	2
Golden Globe Awards	3	6

Totals (Note: Certain award groups do not simply award one winner. They acknowledge several different recipients, have runners-up, and have third place. Since this is a specific recognition and is different from losing an award, runner-up mentions are considered wins in this award tally. For simplification and to avoid errors, each award in this list has been presumed to have had a prior nomination.)
- Wins: 28
- Nominations: 67

This article is a list of awards and nominations received by Kevin Costner

Kevin Costner is an American actor, director, producer, and musician. Known for his leading roles in film and television, he has received various accolades including two Academy Awards, two Actor Awards, a Directors Guild of America Award, a Primetime Emmy Award and three Golden Globe Awards as well as nominations for three BAFTA Awards and two Critics' Choice Awards. He has been honored with a star on the Hollywood Walk of Fame in 2003, an Honorary César in 2013 and the Critics' Choice Lifetime Achievement Award in 2014.

Costner gained acclaim for starring in and directing the revisionist western drama Dances with Wolves (1990) for which he won two Academy Awards for Best Picture and Best Director as well as the Golden Globe Award for Best Director, the Directors Guild of America Award for Outstanding Directorial Achievement in Theatrical Feature Film, and a Special Distinction Independent Spirit Award. He was also nominated for three BAFTA Awards for Best Film, Best Direction, and Best Actor, and competed for the Golden Bear at the Berlin International Film Festival. For his portrayal of Jim Garrison in the Oliver Stone directed political thriller JFK (1991) for which he was nominated for the Golden Globe Award.

He starred in the romantic comedy sports drama Tin Cup (1996) for which he was nominated for the Golden Globe Award for Best Actor in a Motion Picture – Musical or Comedy. He starred as Robin Hood in the swashbuckler film Robin Hood: Prince of Thieves (1991) and as a bodyguard to a music star in the romantic drama The Bodyguard (1992) for which he was nominated for multiple MTV Movie Awards. For his role in the romance The Upside of Anger (2005) he was nominated for the Critics' Choice Movie Award for Best Supporting Actor and the Satellite Award for Best Actor in a Motion Picture. He played a director of a space force organization in the historical drama Hidden Figures (2016) for which he won the Actor Award for Outstanding Performance by a Cast in a Motion Picture and a prize for the Palm Springs International Film Festival.

On television, he portrayed Devil Anse Hatfield in the History Channel miniseries Hatfields & McCoys (2012) for which he won the Primetime Emmy Award for Outstanding Lead Actor in a Limited Series or Movie, the Golden Globe Award for Best Actor – Miniseries or Television Film, and the Actor Award for Outstanding Actor in a Limited Series or Movie as well as nomination for the Critics' Choice Television Award for Best Actor in a Movie/Miniseries. He starred as an owner of a ranch Paramount+ neo-western series Yellowstone (2018–2024) for which he won the Golden Globe Award for Best Actor – Television Series Drama as well as nomination for the Actor Award for Outstanding Ensemble in a Drama Series.

== Major associations ==
=== Academy Awards ===
Year	Category	Nominated work	Result	Ref.
1991	Best Picture	Dances With Wolves	Won	
1991	Best Director	Dances With Wolves	Won	
1991	Best Actor	Dances With Wolves	Nominated	

=== Actor Awards ===
Year	Category	Nominated work	Result	Ref.
2013	Outstanding Actor in a Miniseries or Television Movie	Hatfields & McCoys	Won	
2017	Outstanding Cast in a Motion Picture	Hidden Figures	Won	
2022	Outstanding Ensemble in a Drama Series	Yellowstone	Nominated	

=== BAFTA Awards ===
Year	Category	Nominated work	Result	Ref.
British Academy Film Awards
1991	Best Film	Dances With Wolves	Nominated	
1991	Best Direction	Dances With Wolves	Nominated	
1991	Best Actor in a Leading Role	Dances With Wolves	Nominated	

=== Critics' Choice Awards ===
Year	Category	Nominated work	Result	Ref.
Critics' Choice Movie Awards
2006	Best Supporting Actor	The Upside of Anger	Nominated	
2015	Lifetime Achievement Award		Honoured	
Critics' Choice Television Awards
2012	Best Movie/Miniseries Actor	Hatfields & McCoys	Nominated	

=== Emmy Awards ===
Year	Category	Nominated work	Result	Ref.
Primetime Emmy Awards
2012	Outstanding Lead Actor in a Miniseries or a Movie	Hatfields & McCoys	Won	
2012	Outstanding Miniseries or Movie	Hatfields & McCoys	Nominated	

=== Golden Globe Awards ===
Year	Category	Nominated work	Result	Ref.
1991	Best Director – Motion Picture	Dances With Wolves	Won	
1991	Best Actor – Drama	Dances With Wolves	Nominated	
1992	Best Actor – Drama	JFK	Nominated	
1997	Best Actor – Musical or Comedy	Tin Cup	Nominated	
2013	Best Actor – Miniseries or Television Film	Hatfields & McCoys	Won	
2023	Best Actor – Television Series Drama	Yellowstone	Won	

== Miscellaneous awards ==
Organizations	Year	Category	Work	Result	Ref.
Berlin International Film Festival	1991	Golden Bear	Dances with Wolves	Nominated	
Berlin International Film Festival	1991	Silver Bear for an Outstanding Single Achievement	Dances with Wolves	Won	
Blockbuster Entertainment Awards	2000	Favorite Actor – Drama or Romance	Message in a Bottle	Nominated	
Chicago Film Critics Association	1991	Best Actor	Dances with Wolves	Nominated	
Chicago Film Critics Association	1991	Best Director	Dances with Wolves	Nominated	
César Awards	1992	Best Foreign Feature	Dances with Wolves	Nominated	
César Awards	2013	Honorary César		Honoured	
David di Donatello	1991	Best Foreign Actor	Dances with Wolves	Nominated	
David di Donatello	1991	Best Foreign Film	Dances with Wolves	Nominated	
Directors Guild of America Awards	1991	Best Director	Dances with Wolves	Won	
Golden Raspberry Awards	1992	Worst Actor	Robin Hood: Prince of Thieves	Won	
Golden Raspberry Awards	1993	Worst Picture	The Bodyguard	Nominated	
Golden Raspberry Awards	1993	Worst Actor	The Bodyguard	Nominated	
Golden Raspberry Awards	1995	Worst Picture	Wyatt Earp	Nominated	
Golden Raspberry Awards	1995	Worst Actor	Wyatt Earp	Won	
Golden Raspberry Awards	1995	Worst Remake or Sequel	Wyatt Earp	Won	
Golden Raspberry Awards	1995	Worst Screen Couple	Wyatt Earp	Nominated	
Golden Raspberry Awards	1996	Worst Picture	Waterworld	Nominated	
Golden Raspberry Awards	1996	Worst Actor	Waterworld	Nominated	
Golden Raspberry Awards	1998	Worst Picture	The Postman	Won	
Golden Raspberry Awards	1998	Worst Actor	The Postman	Won	
Golden Raspberry Awards	1998	Worst Director	The Postman	Won	
Golden Raspberry Awards	2000	Worst Actor	For Love of the Game and Message in a Bottle	Nominated	
Golden Raspberry Awards	2000	Worst Actor of the Century		Nominated	
Golden Raspberry Awards	2002	Worst Actor	3000 Miles to Graceland	Nominated	
Golden Raspberry Awards	2002	Worst Screen Couple	3000 Miles to Graceland	Nominated	
Independent Spirit Awards	1991	Special Distinction Award	Dances with Wolves	Won	
Japan Academy Prize	1992	Best Foreign Language Film	Dances with Wolves	Won	
Jupiter Award	1992	Best Foreign Film	Dances with Wolves	Won	
Jupiter Award	1992	Best Foreign Director	Dances with Wolves	Won	
Jupiter Award	1992	Best Foreign Actor	Dances with Wolves	Won	
MTV Movie & TV Awards	1992	Most Desirable Male	Robin Hood: Prince of Thieves	Nominated	
MTV Movie & TV Awards	1992	Best On-Screen Duo (with Morgan Freeman)	Robin Hood: Prince of Thieves	Nominated	
MTV Movie & TV Awards	1992	Best Male Performance	Robin Hood: Prince of Thieves	Nominated	
MTV Movie & TV Awards	1993	Most Desirable Male	The Bodyguard	Nominated	
MTV Movie & TV Awards	1993	Best On-Screen Duo (with Whitney Houston)	The Bodyguard	Nominated	
MTV Movie & TV Awards	1993	Best Male Performance	The Bodyguard	Nominated	
National Board of Review	1991	Best Director	Dances with Wolves	Won	
Palm Springs International Film Festival	2016	Ensemble Performance Award	Hidden Figures	Won	
Producers Guild of America Awards	1991	Outstanding Producer of Theatrical Motion Pictures	Dances with Wolves	Won	
Producers Guild of America Awards	2013	Outstanding Producer of Long-Form Television	Hatfields & McCoys	Nominated	
San Francisco Film Critics Circle	2005	Best Supporting Actor	The Upside of Anger	Won	
Satellite Awards	2005	Best Actor – Motion Picture Musical or Comedy	The Upside of Anger	Nominated	
Satellite Awards	2012	Best Actor – Miniseries or Television Film	Hatfields & McCoys	Nominated	
Saturn Award	1992	Best Actor	Robin Hood: Prince of Thieves	Nominated	
Saturn Award	1998	Best Actor	The Postman	Nominated	

== Special honors ==
Year	Honor	Ref.
1992	Golden Plate Award of the American Academy of Achievement	
2000	World of Little League Museum Hall of Excellence	
2003	The Hollywood Walk of Fame, 6807 Hollywood Boulevard, August 11, 2003, Motion Pictures	
2019	Hall of Great Western Performers at the National Cowboy & Western Heritage Museum in Oklahoma City, Oklahoma	
