= Brainsmasher... A Love Story =

- Directed by: Albert Pyun
- Written by: Albert Pyun
- Produced by: Tom Karnowski
- Starring: Andrew Dice Clay; Teri Hatcher; Yuji Okumoto; Dee Booher; Deborah Van Valkenburgh
- Cinematography: George Mooradian
- Music by: Tony Riparetti
- Distributed by: Trimark Pictures
- Release date: November 17, 1993
- Running time: 88 minutes
- Country: United States
- Language: English

Brainsmasher... A Love Story is a 1993 American romantic comedy film written and directed by Albert Pyun. It stars Andrew "Dice" Clay as Ed "The Brainsmasher" Malloy and Teri Hatcher as Samantha Crain.

== Plot ==
Ed Malloy, a tough bouncer from Portland, Oregon, is dragged into a twisted web of lies, magic, and kung fu. Samantha Crain is a glamorous supermodel who has everything—except for true love. Her sister Cammy is an "Indiana Jones" styled botanist in search of a very rare lotus flower.

Meanwhile, a group of Chinese Shaolin monks with high-flying martial arts powers are in search of the lotus as well, because they believe that whoever eats its petals will gain infinite powers. (They also indignantly protest, "We are NOT ninjas!" when anyone mischaracterizes them.)

Samantha receives a package from her sister, who is trying to escape back to America, with the Shaolin monks hot on her tail. The package is the rare lotus flower. It's arranged for the Crain sisters to meet in Portland. But the monks intervene, and the Crain sisters flee separately. While racing through the streets of Portland, Samantha seeks refuge in a bar that employs Ed Malloy (Andrew "Dice" Clay), who is notoriously nicknamed "The Brainsmasher."

Malloy sees the monks and decides to help Samantha. While on the chase from the monks (and occasionally, Malloy's mother), the two fall in love.

Desperate, the monks capture Malloy and hold him for ransom: His life for the lotus. The Crain sisters agree, but then double-cross the monks, and Malloy saves the day by living up to his 'Brainsmasher' moniker.

== Cast ==
- Andrew "Dice" Clay as Ed "The Brainsmasher" Malloy
- Teri Hatcher as Samantha Crain
- Deborah Van Valkenburgh as Cammy Crain
- Yuji Okumoto as Wu, Leader of The Shaolin Monks
- Peter Kwong as Red Monk
- Brion James as Detective Brown
- Tim Thomerson as Detective Black
- Charles Rocket as Detective Jones
- Nicholas Guest as Detective Smith
- Ralph Monaco as Pops Malloy
- Liz Sheridan as Ma Malloy
- Dorothy Dells as Miss Bellows
- Dee Booher as Bertha
- Galen Schrick as Jimmy Romeo
- Steve Tancora as Bob Brisco
- Russ Fast as Ted
- Kelsi Pollard as Ted's Date
- Karrie Grove as Waitress At Bar None
- Lin Shaye as Makeup Artist
- Sonia Satra as Model #1
- Anahit Minasyan as Model #2
- Nichole McAuley as Veronica (uncredited)

== Release ==
The movie was released directly to videocassette in 1993 by Vidmark Entertainment. It has never been released in the United States on DVD and as of January 4, 2010, Lionsgate has yet to announce any plans for a DVD release. It is available on DVD in Australia and the United Kingdom.
