= Shadows Run Black =

- European DVD cover
- Directed by: Howard Heard
- Written by: Duke Howard; Craig Kusaba
- Produced by: Eric Louzil
- Starring: Elizabeth Trosper; William J. Kulzer; Kevin Costner; Shea Porter; George Engelson
- Cinematography: John Sprung
- Edited by: Raúl Dávalos; Davide Ganzino
- Distributed by: Troma Entertainment
- Release date: 1984
- Running time: 91 minutes
- Country: United States
- Language: English

Shadows Run Black is a 1984 erotic crime thriller directed by Howard Heard and starring Kevin Costner.

== Plot ==
The film follows a tough Los Angeles detective as he races against time to discover who is behind a string of brutal serial slayings. Costner plays the film's main suspect.

== Cast ==
- Kevin Costner as Jimmy Scott
- William J. Kulzer as Rydell King
- Elizabeth Trosper as Judy Cole (credited as Elizabeth Carroll Trosper)
- Shea Porter as Morgan Cole
- George Engelson as Priest (credited as George J. Engelson)
- Dianne Hinkler as Helen Cole
- Julius Metoyer as Billy Tovar
- Terry Congie as Lee Faulkner
- Lee Bishop as Police Officer

== Critical reception ==
AllMovie called the film "execrable" and an "exploitational slice-n-dicer masquerading as a police thriller".
