= Kevin Costner & Modern West =

American country rock band

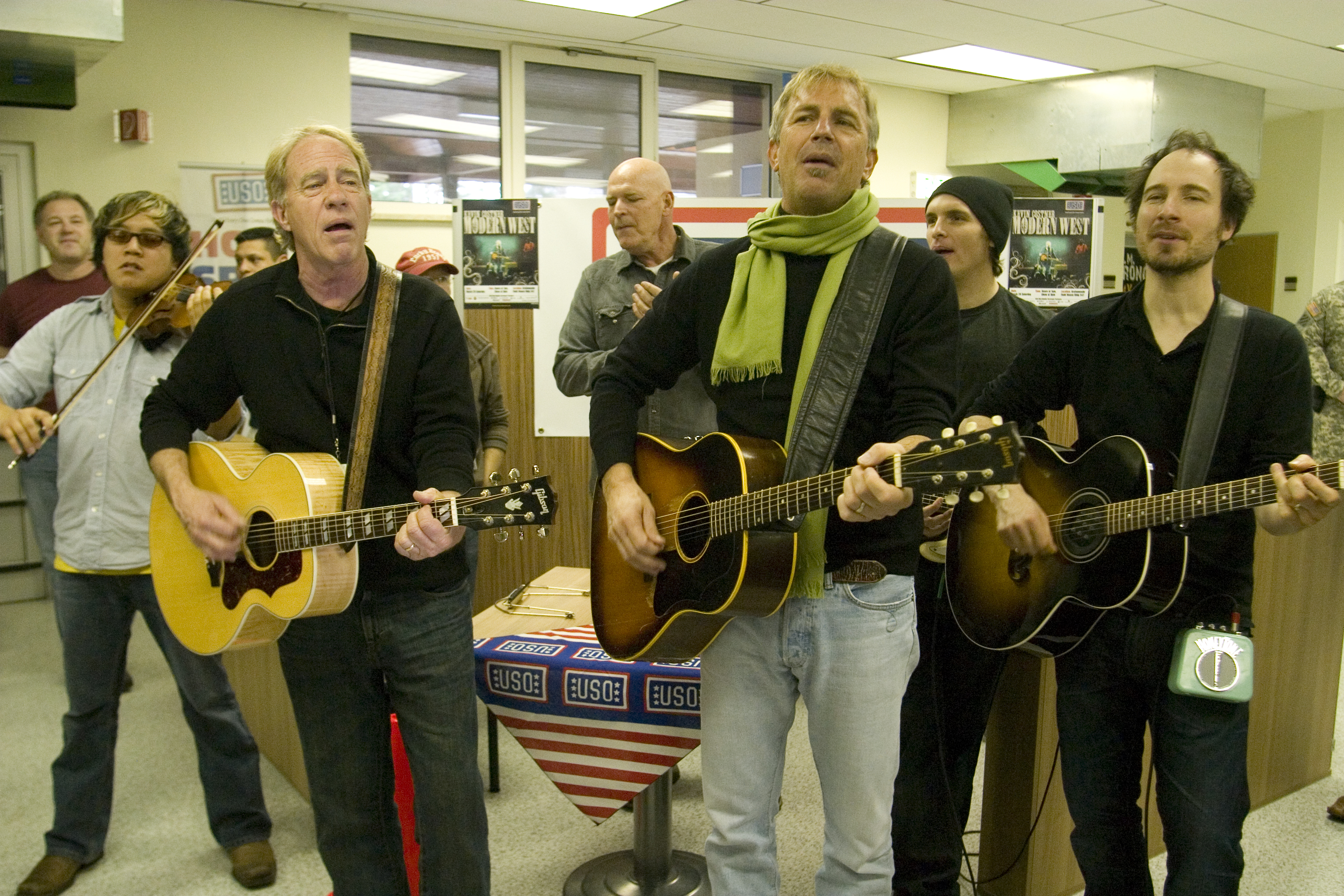

Background information
- Genres: Country rock, country
- Years active: 2007–present
- Label: Universal South
- Members: Kevin Costner; John Coinman; Teddy Morgan; Blair Forward; Larry Cobb; Park Chisolm; Luke Bulla; Bobby Yang; Roddy Chong

Kevin Costner & Modern West is an American country rock band founded and fronted by actor Kevin Costner. He began a worldwide tour with the band in October 2007, which included shows in Istanbul and Rome. It also performed at NASCAR Sprint Cup Series races at Daytona International Speedway and Lowe's Motor Speedway in Concord, North Carolina.

The band released its first country album, Untold Truths, on November 11, 2008, on Universal South Records. It peaked at No. 61 on the Billboard Top Country Albums chart and No. 35 on the Top Heatseekers chart. Three singles ("Superman 14", "Long Hot Night" and "Backyard") have been released to radio, although none have charted. Videos were made for the songs "Superman 14", "Backyard" and "Hey Man What About You".

In 2009, Costner went on tour with the band and special guests The Alternate Routes. In August, at the Big Valley Jamboree in Camrose, Alberta, Costner and the band were scheduled next on stage when a severe thunderstorm struck, causing the stage and stands on the main stage to collapse. One person was reported dead and forty wounded. Later, an auction was held to raise money for the two young sons of the woman killed. A dinner with Costner was auctioned for $41,000. Two guitars, one autographed by Costner, helped raise another $10,000 each.

In February 2010, Kevin Costner & Modern West released their second album, Turn It On, only in Europe. To support the album the band toured Europe, with Turn It On reaching the album charts in Germany, Austria, Switzerland and Greece. The first single from the album, "Let Me Be the One", with special guest Sara Beck singing with Costner, was also made as a music video. A third album, From Where I Stand, was released in 2011 and included vocals from the German pop singer Nena. In April 2012, the band played a benefit gala for the Adrienne Arsht Center for the Performing Arts in Miami, Florida.

== Discography ==
=== Studio albums ===
Title	Album details	Peak chart positions							
Title	Album details	US Country	US	US Heat	US Indie	AUT	GER	GRE	SWI
Untold Truths	Release date: November 11, 2008; Label: Universal South Records	61	—	35	—	—	—	—	—
Turn It On	Release date: February 26, 2010; Label: Edel Music	—	—	—	—	25	28	31	65
From Where I Stand	Release date: September 27, 2011; Label: Edel Music	—	—	—	—	—	39	—	62
Famous for Killing Each Other: Music from and Inspired By Hatfields & McCoys	Release date: May 22, 2012; Label: Madison Gate Records	14	73	16	15	—	—	—	—
Tales from Yellowstone	Released: 2020; Label: Kevin's Music								
"—" denotes releases that did not chart or were not released to that country

=== Singles ===
Year	Single	Album
2008	"Superman 14"	Untold Truths
2008	"Long Hot Night"	Untold Truths
2009	"Backyard"	Untold Truths
2009	"Hey Man What About You"	Untold Truths
2010	"Let Me Be the One" (featuring Sara Beck)	Turn It On
2011	"Let Go Tonight" (featuring Nena)	From Where I Stand
2014	"Alive in the City"	
2017	"Love Shine"	

=== Music videos ===
Year	Video	Director
2008	"Superman 14"	Mark Gillard
2008	"Backyard"	Rory Karpf
2010	"Turn It On"	
