= Dan Magnus =

American mixed martial artist

- Dan Magnus in 2020
- Born: September 18, 1956 (age 69); New York, New York
- Occupations: Martial artist, businessman
- Years active: 1969-present
- Known for: Kickboxing
- Notable work: The M.A.G.N.U.S. Method
- Partner: Tracee Meltzer (2013-present)
- Children: 1
- Awards: 2x World Kickboxing Champion

Daniel Magnus (born September 18, 1956) is an American martial artist, celebrity bodyguard, fugitive recovery specialist, businessman and heart transplant survivor. He is a two-time world kickboxing champion and is best known for being the only person to ever defend his championship title after open-heart surgery. He is an 8th-degree Black Belt and has owned and operated five Martial Arts schools.

== Early life ==
Dan Magnus was born in New York, New York, the son of Everett and Elizabeth Magnus.

He is the oldest of 3 children: Daniel, Connie and Lee. He attended George Washington High School in New York, New York and graduated from the Class of 1974.

As a teenager, Magnus was a competitive roller skater from 1973 to 1976. He won third-place for Junior Men Figures at the 1974 National Roller Skating Championships.

== Early career ==
After finishing his studies at John Jay College of Criminal Justice in Police Science, Magnus became a New York City police officer. It was during this time that Magnus started training full-contact fighting with future world karate champion Jeff Smith. This training helped him as he moved onto being a contract fugitive recovery specialist. Magnus concurrently competed, owned his own martial arts schools and also trained police officers. During his time in fugitive recovery and private bounty hunting, he had been shot and stabbed many times while on duty. In 1989, he was hit by a car during a chase which caused him to fall over a 4-foot retaining wall, breaking his ribs, which pierced his heart, and subsequently severing his aortic valve.

== Kickboxing And Coming Back From Heart Surgery ==
Magnus began his martial arts training in 1969, learning from big names in the martial arts field such as Peter Urban, Jeff Smith, Rodney Batiste and Bill "Superfoot" Wallace. He won 35 of his 45 full-contact fights and became the United States light-middleweight full-contact karate champion in 1982 and the #3 contender in the world.

Shortly after winning the championship title in 1982, Magnus was chasing a fugitive and was hit by a car which sent him tumbling over a 4-foot retaining wall. In April 1983, Magnus was preparing for a world title bout in Denver against Tom Dalton when doctors detected a heart murmur an hour before the match. The doctors did not allow him to fight, even after he protested and choked the doctor. Despite threatening everyone, there was no title bout and the world championship title was given to someone else.

The doctors discovered that he was bleeding internally. The accident from the previous year had broken his ribs which punctured his heart and tore his aortic valve. After undergoing surgery, about a quarter of his heart was now made of metal. In 1984, the Professional Karate Association vacated his US championship title because of a policy where if a fighter is injured and cannot defend their title within that year, they are stripped of their title. At the same time, his wife filed for divorce, he lost his house, lost his dog and his finances were dwindling. Seven different cardiologists had also told him that he would never fight again. He set out to prove them wrong and trained to regain his strength, walking out of the hospital 10 days later. He fought the following year—one year to the day after the surgery—and defeated Tom Dalton in Atlantic City and gained back his title in a unanimous judges' decision. After seeing how he got back into shape, two of the doctors started to take martial arts lessons from him.

As of 2021, Magnus is still the only person on the planet to come back to competition from open heart surgery and win a fight.

== Life After Kickboxing ==
10 years after his first heart surgery, the valve ripped again in June 1994. In the original procedure, the doctors were hoping to avoid replacing the heart valve so they stitched it back together but now there was irreparable damage so it was replaced with a mechanical valve. After being given a 50/50 chance of survival, Dan Magnus walked out of the hospital 4 days later.

In 1997, Magnus, along with G. Q. Money, co-founded Central Wrestling Organization (CWO) in Colorado. To coincide, Magnus opened Slam City Wrestling School, the first pro-wrestling training school in Colorado. Magnus wasn't looking for professional wrestlers for the wrestling school. He just wanted people who wanted to "try out their dreams." Beyond expectation, Slam City's popularity exploded.

Since the early 2010s, Magnus has periodically offered self-defense trainings around the country. Originally named "R.E.A.C.T. Before You A.C.T.," he renamed the personal protection seminars "Victim No More." He also wrote a book in 2014 on self defense, The M.A.G.N.U.S. Method: R.E.A.C.T. B 4 U A.C.T. He also contributed to a book for students heading off to college with a bonus chapter: "How to Keep Your Teen Safe on Campus."

In 2018, Magnus underwent another heart surgery but, like the previous two times, bounced back after doctors had given him dim diagnoses.

In 2019, Magnus was nominated for a Los Angeles Broadway World Award for Best Choreography for "Afterglow: 80s Musical Experience," a musical play based on the real-life stories of the original Gorgeous Ladies of Wrestling (GLOW). He also acted in the role of "Referee" in the show. In 2020, he was nominated for a Broadway World Los Angeles Award in the Best Choreographer of the Decade category. The show ended up winning two awards: Best Ensemble of the Decade and Director of a Musical of the Decade.

At the end of 2020, at 64, Magnus found himself awaiting a heart transplant. Though outwardly asymptomatic, he was admitted into ICU in wait for a heart. Though two hearts were offered, they were not strong enough to match with his active lifestyle. In March 2021, a matching heart was found and Magnus successfully received a heart transplant after having been in the hospital for nearly 6 months. He returned home 2 weeks after surgery.

== Trainees ==
Dan Magnus has trained many martial artists over the years.

- Danny Boccagno (martial artist)
- Sifu Chee (martial artist)
- John Fabbricatore
- Jason David Frank (White Dragon, Green Power Ranger)
- Steve Magill (martial artist)

== Personal life ==
After two marriages and divorces, Magnus has partnered with Tracee Meltzer since 2013.
