= Roxy Astor =

American actress and wrestler

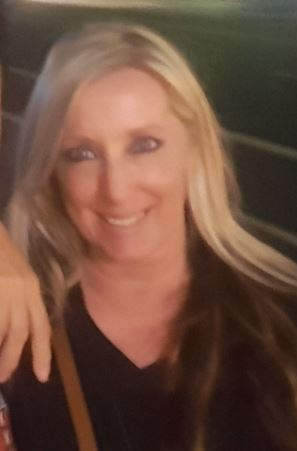
- Meltzer in 2016
- Born: Tracee Leigh Phelps; October 23, 1962 (age 64); Auburn, Washington, U.S.
- Occupations: Actress, Wrestler, Hairstylist
- Years active: 1988–present
- Notable work: G.L.O.W.: Gorgeous Ladies of Wrestling (1988–1990), Afterglow (2014–present)
- Partners: Dan Magnus (2013–present)
- Children: 3

Tracee Leigh Meltzer (née Phelps) (born October 23, 1962), best known as Roxy Astor, is an American actress, wrestler, children's fashion designer and hairstylist. She wrestled as one half of the tag team duo The Park Avenue Knockouts on G.L.O.W.: Gorgeous Ladies of Wrestling. She wrestled on G.L.O.W. for seasons 3 and 4.

== Early life ==
Tracee Leigh Phelps was born in Auburn, Washington, the daughter of Earleen Ane Colvin (née Phelps).

She is the oldest of 2 children: Tracee and Kim. She attended Auburn High School in Auburn, Washington. After graduating, she studied fashion illustration at Seattle Art Institute.

== Early career ==
Meltzer moved to California after a break up. She became a hairdresser and later was interested in auditioning for GLOW, although she had no acting experience.

== GLOW Wrestling ==
Meltzer saw a banner on TV that said, “Do you want to be a GLOW Girl?” Despite having no acting experience, this prompted her to audition for the show. She initially tried out with becoming a bad girl in mind, even bringing headshots of her standing next to a motorcycle. After seeing her audition out of 3500 other women, director Matt Cimber hired her: Meltzer wrestled as Roxy Astor for seasons 3 and 4 of GLOW’s run on syndicated television.Despite being a natural blond from Washington, her character was a red-headed socialite from New York City. Ironically, she had never been to New York in her life up to that point. Having been a professional hairdresser, Meltzer did a lot of the wrestlers’ hair for GLOW, including her own. She colored her hair with temporary red dye. Meltzer's character Roxy Astor along with her tag team partner Tiffany Mellon (played by Sandra Lee Schwab, later known as Tiffany Million in the adult film industry) were the Park Avenue Knockouts, replacing the Beverly Hills Beauties Tina Ferrari and Ashley Carter (played by Lisa Moretti and Nadine Kadmiri, respectively) from seasons 1 and 2.

Years after GLOW had been taken off the air, an award-winning documentary about the show, GLOW: The Story of the Gorgeous Ladies of Wrestling, was produced in 2012. Besides Meltzer, her daughter Kayla Meltzer (who wrestled under the name Juvi Hall in Wrestlicious and tried out for WWE’s NXT as Britney Astor) was also interviewed for the film. The documentary sparked a renewed interest in GLOW and, in 2013, Matt Cimber started working on a new wrestling program called Femme D’Action starring new wrestlers as well as some of the original GLOW wrestlers in different non-wrestling roles.

== AfterGlow ==
Despite being a ratings juggernaut that surpassed even WWF wrestling (later renamed WWE), GLOW was unexpectedly cancelled. “For me, it was just never quite done,” said Meltzer, whose sentiments reflected many of the other wrestlers who never had the opportunity to find closure when the show stopped production. The 2012 documentary GLOW: The Story of the Gorgeous Ladies of Wrestling had revived renewed interest in GLOW and just as the wrestlers had not found closure, they also learned that their fans were left wondering what had happened, too. With many of the wrestlers being found by fans on social media, Meltzer decided to plan a reunion for the fans by starting a Kickstarter campaign called “The AfterGLOW Fan Party.” Fundraising surpassed the $5000 goal.

Several of the original wrestlers from GLOW reunited for the first ever Q-&-A stage show called “The AfterGlow Fan Party” on Saturday, October 25, 2014 at the Acme Comedy Theater in Hollywood. Johnny C, the original ring announcer from GLOW emceed the event. The wrestlers in attendance were Daisy (Helena LeCount), Dallas (Debi Pelletier Miller), Godiva (Dawn Maestas), Gremlina (Sandy Manley), Jailbait (Trisha Casella), Little Egypt (Angelina Altashin), Major Tanya (Noelle Rose), Matilda the Hun (Deanna Booher), Melody Trouble Vixen (Eileen O'Hara), Roxy Astor (Tracee Meltzer), and Sunny the California Girl (Patricia Summerland).

After the success of the first AfterGLOW Fan Party, Meltzer continued with the AfterGLOW brand and has used that platform to bring recognition to the original GLOW franchise. She organizes AfterGLOW events for fan meet-and-greets.

She has also planned personal appearances around the country where fans can meet her and bring their GLOW related items for her to sign. She has also set up wrestling workshops to train "ordinary folks" to transform into invincible GLOW wrestlers themselves.

== AfterGLOW: The 80s Musical Experience Stage Show ==
AfterGLOW: The 80s Musical Experience was the brainchild of original GLOW girl Roxy Astor (Tracee Meltzer). On October 23, 2018, Meltzer's 56th birthday, all of her labor came to fruition and AfterGLOW: The 80's Musical Experience premiered at the 11:11 Theatre in West Hollywood. Directed by award-winning Christopher G. Carver and written by Melissa Wassum, the show starred five of the original GLOW girls: Matilda The Hun (Dee Booher), Roxy Astor (Tracee Meltzer), MTV (Eileen O'Hara), Dallas (Debi Pelletier Miller), and Sunny the California Girl (Patricia Summerland). The show is based on the real-life stories of 5 of the original GLOW wrestlers. The show opens with the wrestlers reunited at Mountain Fiji’s memorial as they relive never before told stories from behind the scenes of GLOW. The show also starred LA Radio talk radio star Sheena Metal and Shameless star Mary Kennedy (New Fiona). Also starring in this show were Kayla Ane Meltzer (Roxy Astor’s real life daughter and professional wrestler), Charlene Ward, Jasmine Fontes, Melissa Wssaum, Taylor Ann Tracy, Justin Root, Robert Samo, and Nic Hodges.

Meltzer was nominated for a Broadway World Award for her role as "Roxy Astor" in the show. The show itself earned 8 nominations. In 2020, she received a BroadwayWorld Los Angeles nomination for Costume Design of the Decade. The show ended up winning two awards: Best Ensemble of the Decade and Director of a Musical of the Decade.

In 2021, the show, renamed AfterGLOW 80s Extravaganza, won Most Anticipated Upcoming Production of a Play from BroadwayWorld Las Vegas.

== Matilda the Hun: The Raw Meat Stage Play ==
Matilda the Hun: The Raw Meat was a stage play produced, written, directed by and starred Roxy Astor and Robert Nguyen on July 26, 27, and 28, 2024 at the Zephyr Theatre in Hollywood. The show is based on the personal stories of Roxy Astor and Robert Nguyen with Deanna Booher, more famously known as Matilda the Hun, in her last years. By the end of the year, the show had been nominated in 10 different categories for the Broadway World Awards which resulted in 3 wins for David Navarro for Best Music Direction & Orchestra Performance, Best Scenic Design of a Play or Musical, and Best Sound Design of a Play or Musical.

The following year, Roxy Astor, Robert Nguyen and David Navarro brought the show back, where it was selected along with over 400 unique shows to be performed at the Hollywood Fringe Festival. For the Hollywood Fringe Festival, the show was condensed to an hour and there were five performances throughout the month of June (7, 16, 22, 26, 29).

== Afterglow Women's Wrestling ==
On April 25, 2025, it was announced that Roxy Astor would co-create and co-executive produce Afterglow Women's Wrestling with UPW Pro Wrestling Executive Producer Steven Van Beckum. Afterglow Women's Wrestling would debut with a test run of filming on August 24, 2025 at Superior Fan Fest in Marquette, MI where UPW is based. They will then film the pilot for the show in Las Vegas on December 5, 2025–40 years to the date when the original GLOW was recorded.

== Personal life ==
Meltzer is the mother of three children: Dylan, Kayla and Lindzee. Her daughter Kayla wrestled for the Wrestlicious promotion under the name “Juvi Hall” and has also wrestled under the name "Britney Astor." Shortly after GLOW ended, Meltzer applied her education in fashion illustration to design children's fashion. Her line "Designs by Tracee" hung in several prestigious stores; among them were Fred Segal, Santa Monica and in a shop at Treasure Island Hotel in Las Vegas when the casino/hotel was newly built. She has also been dating former U.S. marshal and 2-time world kickboxing champion Dan Magnus since 2013. Meltzer is a frequent guest on several radio shows such as GoTarryn! TV and Totally Driven Radio.
