= Untold Truths =

Studio album by Kevin Costner and Modern West
- Released: November 11, 2008
- Genre: Country rock
- Length: 50:18
- Label: Universal South
- Producer: John Coinman, Teddy Morgan

Kevin Costner and Modern West chronology
Untold Truths (2008)	Turn It On (2010)

Singles from Untold Truths
- 1. "Superman 14" Released: September 2008; 2. "Long Hot Night" Released: November 2008; 3. "Backyard" Released: January 2009

Professional ratings
Review scores
Source	Rating
Allmusic	3/5 stars

Untold Truths is the debut country album from actor-turned-singer Kevin Costner & Modern West. The album was released on November 11, 2008, on Universal South Records. The album reached #61 on the U.S. Billboard Top Country Albums, and #35 on the U.S. Top Heatseekers charts.

Three singles, "Superman 14", "Long Hot Night", and "Backyard", were released to radio, although none of the songs entered the Hot Country Songs chart.

== Track listing ==
No.	Title	Writer(s)	Length
1.	"Long Hot Night"	John Coinman, Teddy Morgan	4:27
2.	"90 Miles an Hour"	Park Chisholm, Kevin Costner, Teddy Morgan	5:18
3.	"Hey Man What About You"	John Coinman	4:28
4.	"Superman 14"	John Coinman, Teddy Morgan	5:36
5.	"Don’t Lock’em Away (Song For Molly)"	John Coinman, Kevin Costner, Teddy Morgan	3:44
6.	"Down in Nogales"	John Coinman	4:34
7.	"Every Intention"	John Coinman	4:08
8.	"Five Minutes from America"	John Coinman, Kevin Costner, Teddy Morgan	4:40
9.	"The Sun Will Rise Again"	Park Chisholm, John Coinman, Kevin Costner, Teddy Morgan	3:51
10.	"Backyard"	John Coinman, Kevin Costner, Teddy Morgan	4:37
11.	"Leland Iowa"	John Coinman	3:59
12.	"Gotta Get Away (Song for Bud)"	John Coinman, Kevin Costner, Teddy Morgan	3:36

== Chart performance ==
=== Album ===
Chart (2008)	Peak position
U.S. Billboard Top Country Albums	61
U.S. Billboard Top Heatseekers	35

=== Singles ===
Year	Single	Peak positions
Year	Single	US Country
2008	"Superman 14"	—
2008	"Long Hot Night"	—
2009	"Backyard"	—
2009	"Hey Man What About You"	—
"—" denotes releases that did not chart

== See also ==
- 2008 in country music
