= Chasing Dreams (film) =

- Directed by: Therese Conte; Sean Roche
- Written by: David G. Brown; Therese Conte; Sean Roche
- Produced by: David G. Brown; Therese Conte
- Starring: David G. Brown; Kevin Costner; John Fife
- Cinematography: Connie Holt
- Edited by: Robert L. Sinise; Jerry Weldon
- Music by: Gregory Conte
- Production company: Nascent Productions
- Distributed by: Nascent Productions; Prism Entertainment
- Release date: 1982
- Running time: 94 minutes
- Country: United States
- Language: English

Chasing Dreams is a 1982 American sports film directed by Therese Conte and Sean Roche, and starring David G. Brown. Its plot revolves around a teenage boy, growing up on a farm, who discovers he has a knack for baseball. The film is mainly remembered for a small role by Kevin Costner as the hero's older brother.
