= Dee Booher =

American professional wrestler and actress (1948–2022)

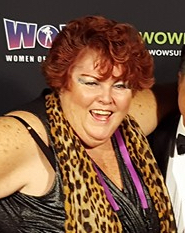
- Deanna Booher at the WOW red carpet event in 2016
- Born: Deanna White; August 6, 1948; Torrance, California, U.S.
- Died: January 7, 2022 (aged 73)
- Occupations: actress, professional wrestler
- Spouse: Ken Booher
- Children: 1 Professional wrestling career
- Ring name(s): Matilda the Hun; Queen Adrena; Queen Kong
- Billed height: 6 ft 4 in (193 cm)
- Billed weight: 340 lb (154 kg)
- Billed from: Germany (as Matilda the Hun)
- Trained by: Mando Guerrero
- Debut: December 5, 1985
- Retired: 1996

Deanna Booher (August 6, 1948 – January 7, 2022) was an American actress, professional wrestler, and roller derby skater. She is known for her appearances with Gorgeous Ladies of Wrestling as Matilda the Hun, as well as her appearances in films such as Brainsmasher... A Love Story and Spaceballs.

== Early life ==
Booher grew up in Lake Arrowhead, California. Prior to becoming involved in wrestling, she held jobs including as a masseuse and as a phone sex operator. She wrestled at El Camino Junior College in California, helping the team win a state championship.

== Professional wrestling career ==
Booher made her first foray into professional wrestling by organizing amateur mud wrestling shows, performing as a masked character named "Queen Kong". After California's gaming commission barred her from wrestling men, her first professional match was against a 700 lb (320 kg) bear.

Booher later teamed with GLOW creator David McLane and director Matt Cimber to cast, recruit and train performers for the first all-women's professional wrestling show. She also wrote the show's theme song. Booher portrayed Matilda the Hun in GLOW. Her villainous character ate raw meat in the ring and scared children in the crowd, which Booher said she enjoyed.

After two years with GLOW, Booher and others left to form a competing show called Powerful Women of Wrestling, but it was unsuccessful.

Booher said she learned her signature move, a big splash, from watching English professional wrestler Big Daddy.

In 2012, Booher appeared in a documentary about GLOW, titled GLOW: The Story of the Gorgeous Ladies of Wrestling.

== Acting career ==
After Booher's professional wrestling career, she earned a living doing stunt work as well as by performing singing telegrams that incorporated aspects of wrestling.

Booher had several film roles in her career, including in the Mel Brooks comedy Spaceballs. She was in the romantic comedy Brainsmasher... A Love Story alongside Andrew "Dice" Clay and Teri Hatcher. She also appeared in the music video for Aerosmith's "Love in an Elevator", carrying a dwarf on her shoulders.

She also had guest-starring roles in television, including Married... with Children, My Two Dads, Mama's Family and Night Court. She often portrayed her Queen Kong character in these roles.

== Personal life and death ==
Booher was married to her husband Ken Booher for 39 years before he died. She had one son, Dean Booher.

By 2017, Booher used a motorized wheelchair because of wrestling-related spinal deterioration. In her later life, she had lupus and peripheral neuropathy. She died on January 7, 2022, at the age of 73.

== Tributes ==
In July 2024, a stage show in tribute of Booher was co-written, co-directed and co-starred by Tracee Meltzer and Robert Nguyen called Matilda the Hun: The Raw Meat at the Zephyr Theatre in Hollywood. The show was nominated in 10 different categories for BroadwayWorld Awards and resulted in 3 wins for David Navarro for Best Music Direction & Orchestra Performance, Best Scenic Design of a Play or Musical and Best Sound Design of a Play or Musical.

== Filmography ==
Film roles
Year	Title	Role	Notes
1984	Delta Pi	Tawny "Terrible Tawny"	
1985	Grunt! The Wrestling Movie	Female Wrestler	
1986	Welcome to 18	Tough Broad	
1987	Spaceballs	Bearded Lady	
1987	Lust for Freedom	Edna "Big Eddie"	
1987	Deathstalker II	Gorgo, Amazon Champion Wrestler	
1987	Dirty Laundry	Big Lady With Whip	
1987	Crazy Legs	Louise	
1989	Cage	Gang Girl	
1989	Slash Dance	"Repo"	
1990	Club Fed	The Ex-Wife	
1992	The Nutt House	Large Nurse	
1993	Brainsmasher... A Love Story	Bertha	
1993	Little Miss Millions	Sarge	
1994	Save Me	Nude Model	
1995	Theodore Rex	Meanest Woman Truck Driver	
1997	Meet Wally Sparks	Lady Party Guest	
1998	Heaven and the Suicide King	Shirley	
2015	The Dog Wedding	Elaine Pierce	
	Femme d'Action	Invader Manager	Television movie

Television roles
Year	Title	Role	Notes
1985	Hardcastle and McCormick	Woman Wrestler (uncredited)	Episode: "Strangle Hold"
1987	Mama's Family	Masked Mabel #1	Episode: "Mama Mania"
1987	Night Court	Maggie	Episode: "Ladies Night"
1989	Night Court	Nadine	Episode: "The Game Show"
1989	Amen	Ilona	Episode: "Sing, Sister, Sing"
1989	My Two Dads	Mrs. Lurch	Episode: "Joey Gets Pinned"
1990	Dream On	Olga	Episode: "Death Takes a Coffee Break"
1990	In Living Color	Wife (uncredited)	Episode: "Homey D. Clown Returns"
1991	Parker Lewis Can't Lose	Maxine	Episode: "A Walk on the Dark Side"
1995	Married... with Children	Biker Chick	Episode: "The Weaker Sex"

Music video roles
Year	Title	Role	Notes
1989	Love in an Elevator	Wrestler	Single by Aerosmith

== Bibliography ==
- Glamazon Queen Kong: My Life of Glitter, Guts, and Glory (2014)
