= Black or White (film) =

2014 film

- Theatrical release poster
- Directed by: Mike Binder
- Written by: Mike Binder
- Produced by: Kevin Costner; Mike Binder; Todd Lewis
- Starring: Kevin Costner; Octavia Spencer; Jillian Estell; Bill Burr; Jennifer Ehle; André Holland; Gillian Jacobs; Anthony Mackie
- Cinematography: Russ T. Alsobrook
- Edited by: Roger Nygard
- Music by: Terence Blanchard
- Production companies: Sunlight Productions; Treehouse Films; Treehouse Productions; Venture Forth
- Distributed by: Relativity Media (United States); IM Global (International)
- Release dates: September 6, 2014 (TIFF); January 30, 2015 (United States)
- Running time: 121 minutes
- Country: United States
- Language: English
- Budget: $9 million
- Box office: $21.7 million

Black or White is a 2014 American drama film written and directed by Mike Binder. The film stars Kevin Costner, Octavia Spencer, Jillian Estell, Bill Burr, Jennifer Ehle, André Holland, Gillian Jacobs and Anthony Mackie. The film premiered at the 2014 Toronto International Film Festival and was released in the United States on January 30, 2015.

== Premise ==
Following the sudden death of his wife in a car crash, wealthy attorney Elliott Anderson is left to raise his seven-year-old biracial granddaughter, Eloise, entirely alone. Elliott and his late wife had been the child's sole guardians ever since their own daughter died during childbirth, and Eloise's drug-addicted father, Reggie, abandoned them. When Reggie’s mother, Rowena, attends the funeral and demands custody so her troubled son can have a second chance at parenting, an emotionally devastated Elliott angrily refuses, igniting a bitter, racially charged legal battle.

Elliott raises his granddaughter as he struggles with his grief by binge-drinking. Elliott's world is turned upside-down when Rowena demands that Eloise be brought under the care of her father Reggie, whom Elliott blames for the negligence that led to the pregnancy and death of his own daughter.

Elliott soon finds himself deeply entrenched in a custody battle and will stop at nothing to keep his granddaughter from coming under the watch of her reckless father.

== Cast ==
- Kevin Costner as Elliott Anderson
- Octavia Spencer as Rowena Jeffers
- Jillian Estell as Eloise Anderson
- Bill Burr as Rick Reynolds
- Mpho Koaho as Duvan Araga
- André Holland as Reggie Davis
- Jennifer Ehle as Carol
- Gillian Jacobs as Fay
- Paula Newsome as Judge Cummins
- Anthony Mackie as Jeremiah Jeffers

== Production ==
On September 25, 2014, Open Road Films was in talks to acquire the US distribution rights to the film. On October 17, Relativity Media acquired the US rights to the film. Costner financed the film using his own money.

A thousand girls auditioned for the part of Eloise.

=== Filming ===
Principal photography of the film began on July 15, 2013, in New Orleans with the filming lasting for five weeks.

== Release ==
Relativity planned to release the film in time to qualify for the Oscar race, starting with a limited release on December 3, 2014, then opening wide on January 30, 2015.

=== Home media ===
Black or White was released on Blu-ray and DVD on May 5, 2015.

== Reception ==
=== Box office ===
Black or White grossed $21.6 million in North America against a budget of $9 million.

In its opening weekend of January 30, 2015, the film made a gross of $2.3 million on Friday, $3 million on Saturday and $986,312 on Sunday for a weekend total of $6.2 million, playing in 1,823 with a per-theater average of $3,408 and ranking #4.

=== Critical response ===
Black or White received mixed reviews from critics. On Rotten Tomatoes, the film holds a 37% rating, based on 102 reviews, with an average rating of 5.19/10. The website's consensus reads: "Black or White has more on its mind than your average family drama, but the film's approach to its thought-provoking themes too often lives down to its title." On Metacritic, the film has a score of 45 out of 100, based on 30 critics, indicating "mixed or average" reviews. Audiences polled by CinemaScore gave the film an average grade of "A−" on an A+ to F scale.

Jordan Mintzer of The Hollywood Reporter wrote: "Black and White never panders too easily to sentiments, creating characters who are riddled with flaws but likeable all the same." Scott Foundas of Variety praised Costner for his performance, calling it "some of the finest, most deeply felt work of his career" but was critical of the film "this well-intentioned family drama never quite shakes free from its didactic, movie-of-the-week dramaturgy and a hand-holding approach to race-relations."
