= Tin Cup =

1996 film by Ron Shelton

- Theatrical release poster
- Directed by: Ron Shelton
- Written by: John Norville; Ron Shelton
- Produced by: Gary Foster
- Starring: Kevin Costner; Rene Russo; Cheech Marin; Don Johnson
- Cinematography: Russell Boyd
- Edited by: Kimberly Ray; Paul Seydor
- Music by: William Ross
- Production company: Regency Enterprises
- Distributed by: Warner Bros.
- Release date: August 16, 1996
- Running time: 134 minutes
- Country: United States
- Language: English
- Budget: $45 million
- Box office: $75.8 million

Tin Cup is a 1996 American romantic comedy sports film co-written and directed by Ron Shelton, and starring Kevin Costner and Rene Russo with Cheech Marin, Linda Hart and Don Johnson in major supporting roles. The film was released by Warner Bros. on August 16, 1996 and received generally positive reviews from critics and grossed $75.8 million against its $45 million budget. Costner received a nomination for the Golden Globe Award for Best Actor – Motion Picture Musical or Comedy.

== Plot ==
Roy "Tin Cup" McAvoy is a former golf prodigy who lost his chance to become a professional golfer when he attempted a risky shot for the final round of the PGA Tour Qualifying Tournament rather than taking a safer shot. He owns a ramshackle driving range in West Texas, where he drinks and hangs out with his pal Romeo Posar and their friends.

One day Dr. Molly Griswold, a clinical psychologist, arrives looking for a golf lesson. She has been dating David Simms, a top professional golfer who played with Roy at the University of Houston. Roy is attracted to Molly.

The next day, Simms shows up at Roy's trailer ahead of a local benefit tournament. Roy thinks he is being invited to play, but Simms actually wants to hire him as a caddie. During the round, Roy needles Simms about laying up instead of having the nerve to take a 230-yard shot over a water hazard. A bet among the other players is made, and Simms fires Roy after he makes the long shot.

To get even with Simms and prove his worth to Molly, Roy decides to try to qualify for the U.S. Open. He makes a play for Molly. She turns him down but offers to be his sports psychologist in exchange for golf lessons.

In the first qualifying round, with Romeo as his caddie, Roy's game is excellent, but he insists on playing recklessly. They fight, and Romeo quits. Despite breaking most of his clubs in a tantrum, Roy advances to the final qualifying round. Without Romeo, he barely succeeds at the sectional qualifying round, earning a spot in the U.S. Open. Romeo returns and helps Roy with some swing problems.

On the first day of the U.S. Open, Roy, playing hungover, shoots a horrendous 83. Meanwhile, Molly sees Simms' unpleasant side and decides she wants to be with Roy. With renewed confidence, he shocks the golf world by making the cut with a round record at 10 under par. Roy's third round is also excellent and moves him into contention.

On the last day of the tournament, Roy is in a three-way battle to win. For the fourth day in a row, he takes a shot that repeatedly fails to keep the ball out of the water hazard. On his twelfth and final shot, facing disqualification, he reaches the green and gets the ball into the hole. Roy has blown a shot at winning the U.S. Open, but Molly reassures him that people will always remember his amazing shot.

Back in Texas, Molly tells Roy that he automatically qualified for next year's Open. They kiss passionately.

== Cast ==
- Kevin Costner as Roy "Tin Cup" McAvoy
- Rene Russo as Dr. Molly Griswold
- Don Johnson as David Simms
- Cheech Marin as Romeo Posar
- Linda Hart as Doreen
- Rex Linn as Dewey
- Dennis Burkley as Earl
- Lou Myers as Clint
- Richard Lineback as Curt
- George Perez as Jose
- Mickey Jones as Turk
- Michael Milhoan as Boone
- Jim Nantz as CBS announcer
- Ken Venturi as CBS announcer
- Herbert Jaeger as patron

== Production ==
Tin Cup was based on a story by Ron Shelton and Tim Norville inspired by the vulgar expression, "He's (She's) not worth a fart in a tin cup." It was scripted by Norville and received a rewrite from Shelton. Kevin Costner joined the project in June 1995, having previously worked with Shelton on Bull Durham. Filming was due to start on September 15, 1995.

Janine Turner was reportedly the first choice for the role of Molly Griswold, but she turned it down. Michelle Pfeiffer was also approached before Rene Russo was then cast. Dennis Quaid, Pierce Brosnan and Alec Baldwin were considered for the part of David Simms, before Don Johnson was placed in the film. John Leguizamo was offered the character of Romeo Posar until Cheech Marin stepped in to do the role.

Kevin Costner trained extensively with Gary McCord to learn how to play golf, as stated in the foreword Costner wrote for McCord's book, Golf For Dummies. McCord helped Costner develop a swing and pre-shot routine, is listed in the end credits as a golf consultant and has a cameo appearance in the film.

The film's climactic scenes take place at a fictional U.S. Open tournament set in North Carolina.

There are (credited) cameo appearances by pro golfers Phil Mickelson, Craig Stadler, John Cook, Johnny Miller, Lee Janzen, Billy Mayfair, Corey Pavin, Fred Couples and Peter Jacobsen—as well as TV golf broadcasters Jim Nantz, Ken Venturi, Gary McCord, Ben Wright, Frank Chirkinian, Lance Barrow, Peter Kostis, Jimmy Roberts, Brian Hammonds and George Michael—all playing themselves.

Many of the golf shots by Costner's character Roy McAvoy were made by Costner himself.

The scene at the end of the film in which Roy McAvoy repeatedly reaches the water hazard is based on a true incident. Gary McCord, an actual commentator and pro on the Champions Tour, needed a birdie to win. He kept reaching the hazard and it took him 15 strokes to reach the green, then just one putt, from 25 feet, to complete the par-4 hole. In the film, McAvoy holes out the shot in 12.

The ball of Costner's that knocked a pelican off its perch is also based upon a true incident involving McCord.

The film included product placement from Taylor Made. Don Johnson's character David Simms uses a Taylor Made golf bag and clubs. Costner also used Taylor Made, but the prop department repainted and sanded the clubs to make them look suitably rough.

== Legacy ==
An annual golf tournament located in Charlotte, North Carolina that benefits the American Cancer Society is named the "Tin Cup Tournament". It is the American Cancer Society's largest single-day golf event in the Carolinas. Play is always on the second Monday of August. The 2004 REMAX World Long Drive Champion, David Mobley, is an annual celebrity guest. Most recently, the location is at Ballantyne Resort Golf Course.

A yearly golf outing in Appleton, Wisconsin is called the Tin Cup Open and players are able to play with only a 7-iron club, inspired by McAvoy's qualifying meltdown. The outing raises funds for the local Early Intervention Program of Outagamie and Winnebago Counties and takes place annually.

In a 1998 tournament, members of the gallery watching John Daly started shouting “Tin Cup” as he hit ball after ball in the water on his way to scoring 18 on a par-5 hole.

After carding a quadruple bogey and a double bogey on the 17th and 18th holes of the 2013 Players Championship, "Tin Cup" became a nickname for professional golfer Sergio García.

Eddie Pepperell was disqualified from a tournament in 2019 after running out of balls in a moment that was compared to the film.

== Reception ==
=== Box office ===
Tin Cup debuted at number one on its opening weekend, grossing $10.1 million. The film went on to earn $54 million at the US box office, and a worldwide total of $75.8 million against a budget of $45 million.

=== Critical response ===
On Rotten Tomatoes, the film has an approval rating of 74% based on reviews from 53 critics. The site's consensus states: "Breezy and predictable, Tin Cup is a likeable sports comedy that benefits greatly from Kevin Costner's amiable lead performance." On Metacritic the film has a score of 60 out of 100, based on reviews from 19 critics. Audiences surveyed by CinemaScore gave the film a grade B on scale of A to F.

Roger Ebert of the Chicago Sun-Times gave the film 3 out of 4 and wrote: "Well written. The dialogue is smart and fresh." Todd McCarthy of Variety magazine wrote: "Amiable and constantly amusing rather than uproarious, this mangy tale of a ne'er-do-well's fitful assault on personal and professional respectability benefits greatly from Kevin Costner's ingratiatingly comic star turn, his most appealing work in years."

== Soundtrack ==
The soundtrack was released through Sony in 1996.

1. "Little Bit Is Better Than Nada" - The Texas Tornados
2. "Cool Lookin' Woman" - Jimmie Vaughan
3. "Crapped Out Again" - Keb' Mo'
4. "Big Stick" - Bruce Hornsby
5. "Nobody There But Me" - Bruce Hornsby
6. "Let Me into Your Heart" - Mary-Chapin Carpenter
7. "I Wonder" - Chris Isaak
8. "This Could Take All Night" - Amanda Marshall
9. "Back to Salome" - Shawn Colvin
10. "Just One More" - George Jones
11. "Where Are You Boy" - Patty Loveless
12. "Every Minute, Every Hour, Every Day" - James House
13. "Character Flaw" - Joe Ely
14. "Double Bogey Blues" - Mickey Jones

== See also ==
- Michael Block
