= Sizzle Beach, U.S.A. =

- Theatrical poster
- Directed by: Richard Brander
- Written by: Craig Kusaba
- Produced by: Eric Louzil
- Starring: Terry Congie; Leslie Brander; Roselyn Royce; Robert Acey; Kevin Costner; Larry Degraw; James Pascucci; Peter Risch
- Cinematography: John Sprung
- Edited by: Howard Heard
- Music by: The Beach Towels
- Distributed by: Cineworld; Troma Entertainment
- Release date: 1981
- Running time: 90 minutes
- Country: United States
- Language: English

Sizzle Beach, U.S.A., also known as Malibu Hot Summer, is a 1981 independent film directed by Richard Brander, and starring Terry Congie, Leslie Brander, Roselyn Royce, and Kevin Costner in his film debut. It was filmed from 1978 to 1979. Troma re-released the film in 1986.

Costner was reportedly uncomfortable when filming a sex scene in the film. In the late 1980s, Costner tried to buy the rights to the film so he could keep it out of public view, but Troma Entertainment declined his offer.

In 1993, it was referenced in the Mystery Science Theater 3000 episode Alien from L.A., but was never parodied on any incarnation of the show itself.

== Plot ==
Three young women team up to rent a beach house in Malibu, California. One of them lands a job in a high school, thanks to an investment broker who she meets while jogging along the beach. Another of the women is taking acting lessons and enjoys horseback riding, though the young owner of the stable, John Logan (Kevin Costner), turns out to be more interesting than the riding itself.

The third woman practices her guitar, shuns the owner of the studio where she records, and hangs out with her hunk cousin Steve, the fourth roommate in the house.

== Reception ==
TV Guide panned the film, writing that it was "Inept from the opening titles to the closing credits." Impact magazine described the direction as amateurish and said the storyline's only point is to undress the actors. Costner's brief scene was noted as mild. Joe Bob Briggs wrote: "Best of all, absolutely no plot to make you forget the movie."
