= Kevin Costner =

American actor and filmmaker (born 1955)

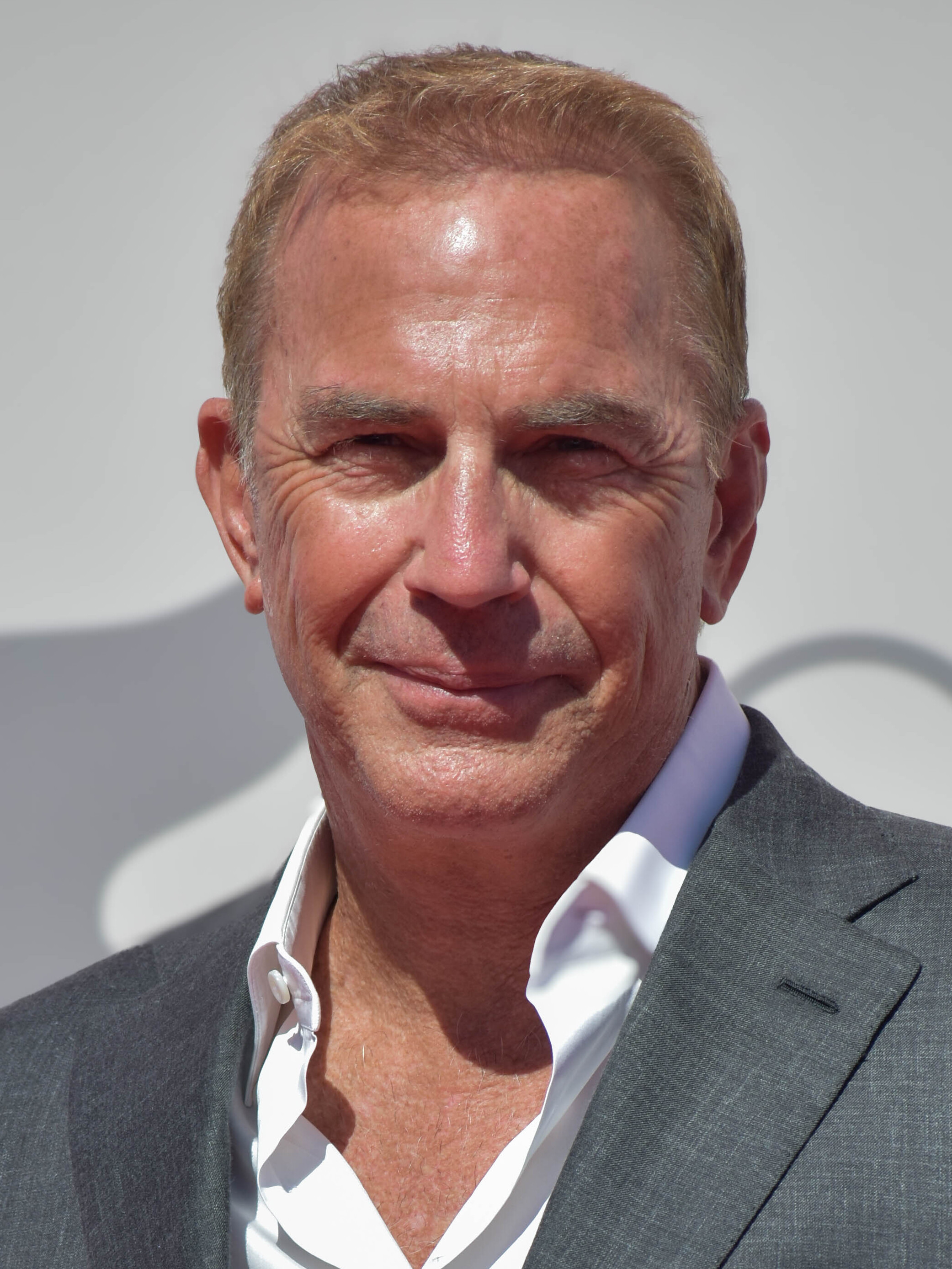
- Costner in 2024
- Born: Kevin Michael Costner; January 18, 1955 (age 71); Lynwood, California, U.S.
- Education: California State University, Fullerton (BA)
- Occupations: Actor; film director; producer; screenwriter; musician
- Years active: 1978–present
- Works: Full list
- Spouses: Cindy Silva (m. 1978; div. 1994) Christine Baumgartner (m. 2004; div. 2024)
- Children: 7
- Awards: Full list

Kevin Michael Costner (born January 18, 1955) is an American actor, filmmaker, and musician. His career in film and television spans more than five decades. His accolades include two Academy Awards, three Golden Globe Awards, and a Primetime Emmy Award as well as nominations for three BAFTA Awards. He has been honored with a star on the Hollywood Walk of Fame in 2003 and an Honorary César in 2013.

Costner rose to prominence starring in such films as The Untouchables (1987), Bull Durham (1988), Field of Dreams (1989), JFK (1991), Robin Hood: Prince of Thieves (1991), The Bodyguard (1992), and A Perfect World (1993). During this time, he directed and starred in the western epic Dances With Wolves (1990), for which he won two Academy Awards: Best Picture, and Best Director. He then starred in and co-produced Wyatt Earp (1994) and Waterworld (1995), and directed The Postman (1997), Open Range (2003), and Horizon: An American Saga (2024).

Costner's other notable films include Silverado (1985), No Way Out (1987), Tin Cup (1996), Message in a Bottle (1999), For Love of the Game (1999), Thirteen Days (2000), Mr. Brooks (2007), Swing Vote (2008), The Company Men (2010), 3 Days to Kill (2014), Draft Day (2014), Black or White (2014), McFarland, USA (2015), and The Highwaymen (2019). He has also played supporting parts in such films as The Upside of Anger (2005), Man of Steel (2013), Jack Ryan: Shadow Recruit (2014), Hidden Figures (2016), Molly's Game (2017), and Let Him Go (2020).

On television, Costner portrayed Devil Anse Hatfield in the miniseries Hatfields & McCoys (2012), winning the Primetime Emmy Award for Outstanding Lead Actor in a Limited or Anthology Series or Movie. From 2018 to 2024, he portrayed rancher John Dutton on the Paramount Network drama series Yellowstone, for which he received a Golden Globe Award in 2023.

== Early life and education ==
Costner was born on January 18, 1955, in Lynwood, California, and grew up in Compton, California. His parents were William and Sharon Costner. He is the youngest of three boys, the second of whom died at birth. Sharon Rae Costner (née Tedrick) was a welfare worker, and William Costner was an electrician and a utilities executive. Costner's father's heritage originates with German immigrants to North Carolina in the 1700s, and Costner also has English, Irish, Scottish, Welsh, and Cherokee ancestry. Costner was raised Baptist. He was not academically inclined in school, but did play sports (especially football), take piano lessons, write poetry, and sing in the First Baptist Choir. He has said that watching the 1962 film How the West Was Won as a child inspired his love for Western films.

Costner has stated that he spent his teenage years in different parts of California as his father's career progressed. He has described this time as a period when he "lost a lot of confidence", having to make new friends often. Costner lived in Ventura, then in Visalia. Costner attended Mt. Whitney High School where he was in the marching band. Costner graduated from Villa Park High School in 1973. He played baseball at Villa Park and was teammates with Dennis Burtt. He earned a BA from California State University, Fullerton (CSUF) in 1978. While at CSUF, he became a brother in the Delta Chi fraternity.

Costner became interested in acting and dancing while in his last year of college. In 1978, while on an airplane returning from his honeymoon in Puerto Vallarta, Costner had a chance encounter with actor Richard Burton. At that time, Costner was uncertain about whether he should become an actor, and he approached Burton to ask his advice. Costner has said that Burton encouraged him to pursue acting. Costner has also stated that he asked Burton whether it was possible to be an actor without experiencing turmoil in one's private life; according to Costner, Burton replied that he thought it was possible. Costner credits Burton with inspiring him to become an actor.

Having agreed to undertake a job as a marketing executive, Costner began taking acting lessons five nights a week, with the support of his wife. His marketing job lasted 30 days. He took jobs that allowed him to develop his acting skills by paying his tuition, including working on fishing boats, as a truck driver, and giving tours of movie stars' Hollywood homes.

== Career ==
=== 1981–1986: Rise to prominence ===
Costner made his film debut in Sizzle Beach, U.S.A. (1981). Costner played a minor role as "Frat Boy #1" in the Ron Howard film Night Shift (1982). In 1983, Costner starred in Stacy's Knights.

Costner appeared in a commercial for the Apple Lisa and Table for Five in 1983, and, the same year, had a small role in the nuclear holocaust film Testament. Later, he was cast in The Big Chill and filmed several scenes that were planned as flashbacks, but they were removed from the final cut. His role was that of Alex, the friend who committed suicide, the event that brings the rest of the cast together. Costner was a friend of director Lawrence Kasdan, who promised the actor a role in a future project. That became Silverado (1985) and a breakout role for Costner. He also starred that year in the smaller films Fandango and American Flyers and appeared alongside Kiefer Sutherland in an hour-long special episode of Steven Spielberg's Amazing Stories.

=== 1987–1994: Stardom and acclaim ===
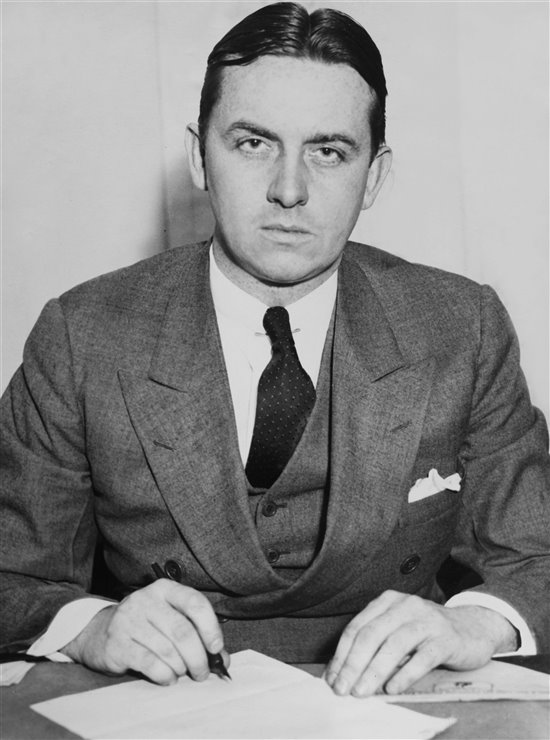
Costner portrayed Eliot Ness (pictured) in The Untouchables (1987)

Costner achieved movie star status in 1987, when he starred as federal agent Eliot Ness in The Untouchables and in the leading role of the thriller No Way Out. He solidified his A-list status in the baseball-themed films Bull Durham (1988) and Field of Dreams (1989). In 1990, he partnered with producer Jim Wilson to form the production company Tig Productions. Tig's first film was the epic Dances With Wolves which Costner directed and starred in. The film was nominated for 12 Academy Awards and won seven, including two for him personally (Best Picture and Best Director). The same year saw the release of Revenge, in which he starred along with Anthony Quinn and Madeleine Stowe, directed by Tony Scott; Costner had wanted to direct it himself.

Costner portrayed Robin Hood in the action-adventure film Robin Hood: Prince of Thieves (1991) where he also served as a producer. Costner starred alongside Alan Rickman, Morgan Freeman, and Christian Slater. The film received mixed reviews but was an immense box-office success. He then starred as District Attorney Jim Garrison in the Oliver Stone-directed political epic thriller JFK (1991). The film gained significant controversy for its historical inaccuracies but was also praised for its style, direction, and performances. Costner received a nomination for a Golden Globe Award for Best Actor – Motion Picture Drama for his role. Critic Roger Ebert praised his performance writing, "As Garrison, Costner gives a measured yet passionate performance. Like a man who has hold of an idea he cannot let go, he forges ahead, insisting that there is more to the assassination than meets the eye."

He then starred opposite Whitney Houston in the romantic drama The Bodyguard (1992) where he also served as a producer. The film was a pop-culture sensation and financial success. The next year he starred as a criminal on the run in Clint Eastwood's drama A Perfect World (1993). Film critic Owen Gleiberman of Entertainment Weekly wrote, "Costner seems about as pathological as a koala bear, and his gentle charisma reinforces the film's touchy-feely theme". He took the title role in the western biopic Wyatt Earp (1994), directed by Lawrence Kasdan, where he also served as a producer. That same year, he starred in the drama film The War. The film also co-starred Elijah Wood. The film seemed to gain little attention.

=== 1995–2011: Career fluctuations ===
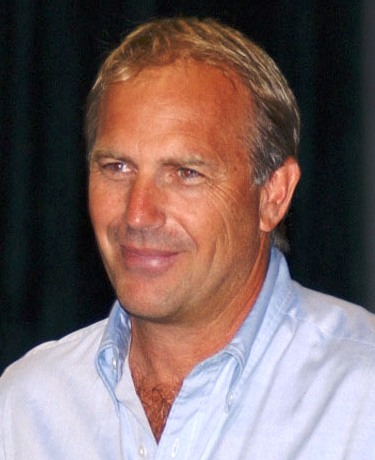
Costner visiting Andrews Air Force Base in July 2003

The science fiction-post-apocalyptic epics Waterworld (1995) and The Postman (1997), the latter of which Costner also directed, were both commercial disappointments and both largely regarded by critics as artistic failures. However, while Waterworld achieved respectable box office and some positive reviews, results for The Postman were far worse and it ended up winning five Golden Raspberry Awards, including Worst Picture, Worst Actor, and Worst Director for Costner. Costner starred in the golf comedy Tin Cup (1996) for Ron Shelton, who had previously directed him in Bull Durham. He developed the film Air Force One and was set to play the lead role of the President, but ultimately decided to concentrate on finishing The Postman instead. He personally offered the project to Harrison Ford. In 1999, he starred in Message in a Bottle with Robin Wright, based on the novel of the same name by Nicholas Sparks. The film drew mixed reviews and just about broke even at the box office.

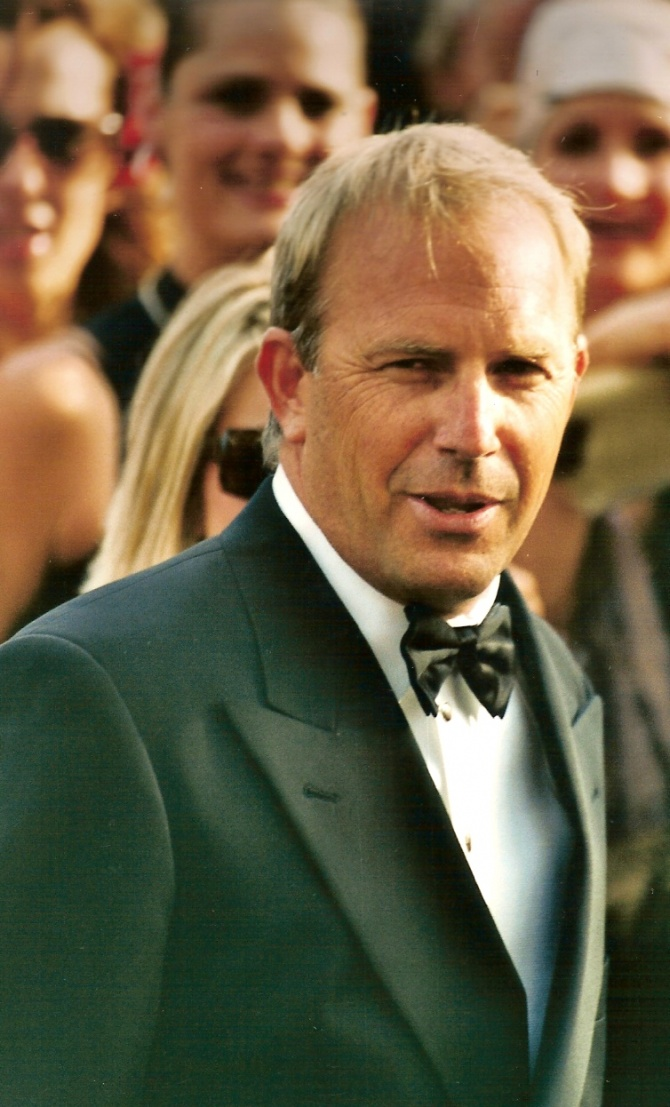
Costner at the 2003 Cannes Film Festival

His career revived somewhat in 2000 with Thirteen Days, in which he portrayed Kenneth O'Donnell, a top adviser to John F. Kennedy. The western Open Range, which he directed and starred in, received critical acclaim in 2003, and was a surprise success commercially. He received some of his best reviews for his supporting role as retired professional baseball player Denny Davies in The Upside of Anger, for which he received a nomination from the Broadcast Film Critics Association and won the San Francisco Film Critics Circle Award for Best Supporting Actor. After that, Costner starred in The Guardian and in Mr. Brooks, in which he portrayed a serial killer. In 2008, his Tig Productions company closed and was changed to Tree House Films.

In 2008, Costner starred in Swing Vote. He starred opposite Jennifer Aniston in the 2005 movie Rumour Has It. Costner was honored on September 6, 2006, when his handprints and footprints were set in concrete in front of Grauman's Chinese Theatre alongside those of other celebrated actors and entertainers. In 2010, he appeared in The Company Men alongside Ben Affleck, Tommy Lee Jones, and Chris Cooper. It debuted at the Sundance Film Festival, and received good reviews. It was released in cinemas worldwide in January 2011.

Costner announced that he would be returning to the director's chair for the first time in seven years, in 2011, with A Little War of Our Own. He was also about to team up again with director Kevin Reynolds in Learning Italian. No updates have been released about either film since their original production announcement. He also appears, as a special cameo, in Funny or Die's "Field of Dreams 2: NFL Lockout". Costner portrayed Jonathan Kent in the rebooted Superman film Man of Steel, directed by Zack Snyder. Costner was going to have a role in Quentin Tarantino's Django Unchained, but had to drop out due to scheduling conflicts.

=== 2012–present: Career resurgence and Yellowstone ===
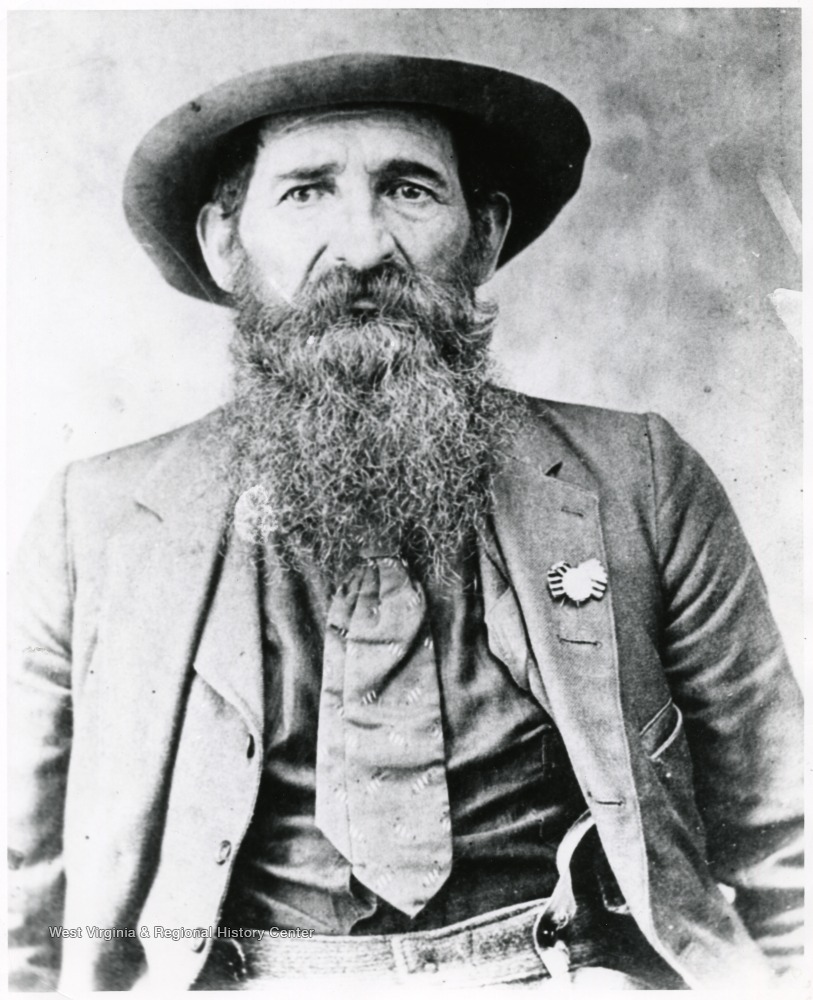
Costner portrayed Devil Anse Hatfield (pictured) in the miniseries Hatfields & McCoys (2012)

Costner portrayed Devil Anse Hatfield in the three-part miniseries Hatfields & McCoys, which premiered on May 28, 2012, on the History Channel. It broke a record by pulling 13.9 million viewers. The miniseries tells the true American story of a legendary family feud – one that spanned decades and nearly launched a war between Kentucky and West Virginia. The role earned Costner the 2012 Emmy Award for Outstanding Lead Actor in a Miniseries or a Movie, the 2013 Screen Actors Guild Award for Outstanding Performance by a Male Actor in a Miniseries or Television Movie, and the 2013 Golden Globe Award for Best Performance by an Actor in a Limited Series or a Motion Picture Made for Television.

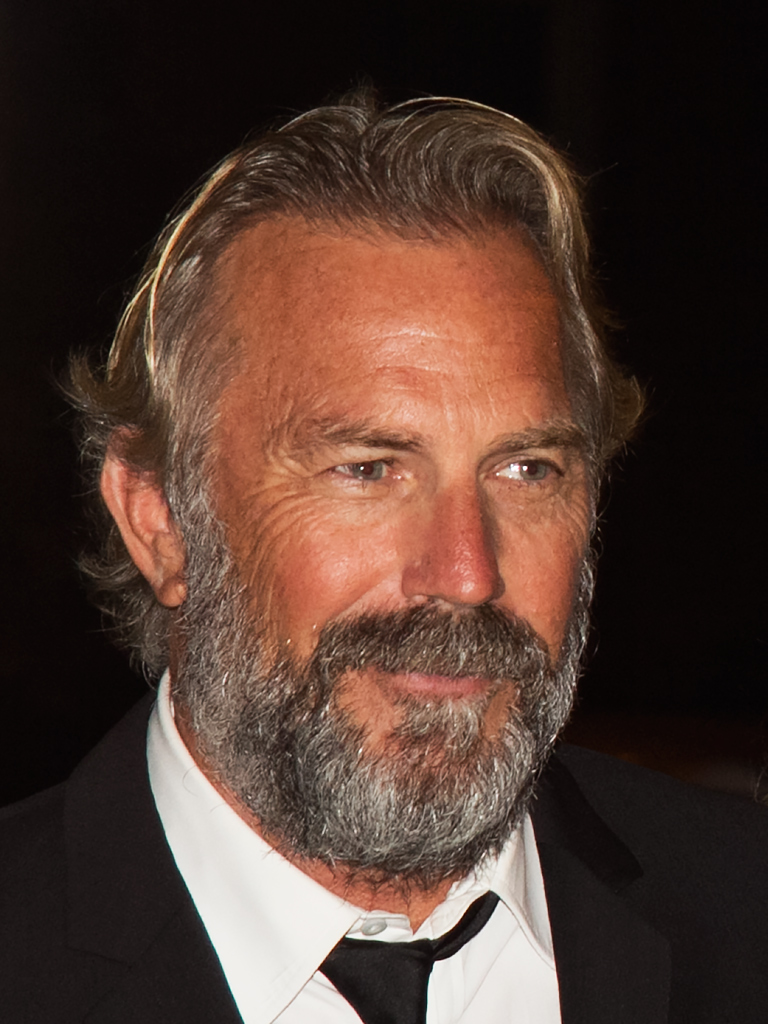
Costner in 2014

In 2014, Costner appeared in the spy film Jack Ryan: Shadow Recruit, as Thomas Harper, a mentor for the series' title character. The same year, he starred in the thriller 3 Days to Kill, and the drama Draft Day, and produced and starred in Black or White. Black or White premiered at the 2014 Toronto International Film Festival and opened in the United States in 2015. In 2015, Costner played coach Jim White in the drama film McFarland, USA, about cross-country running. In 2016, he played the fictional character Al Harrison, a NASA Space Task Group supervisor, in Hidden Figures, and in 2017, he starred with Jessica Chastain in Aaron Sorkin's directorial debut film Molly's Game. From 2018 until mid-way through the show's fifth season, he has starred in and executive produced the television series Yellowstone, marking the first regular TV series role of his career. In 2019, Costner starred in The Art of Racing in the Rain, where he voiced Enzo the dog. It was his first voice-over film in his career. In 2020 Costner co-starred with Diane Lane in the neo-Western thriller Let Him Go (2020) (a No.1 box office hit during the COVID pandemic).

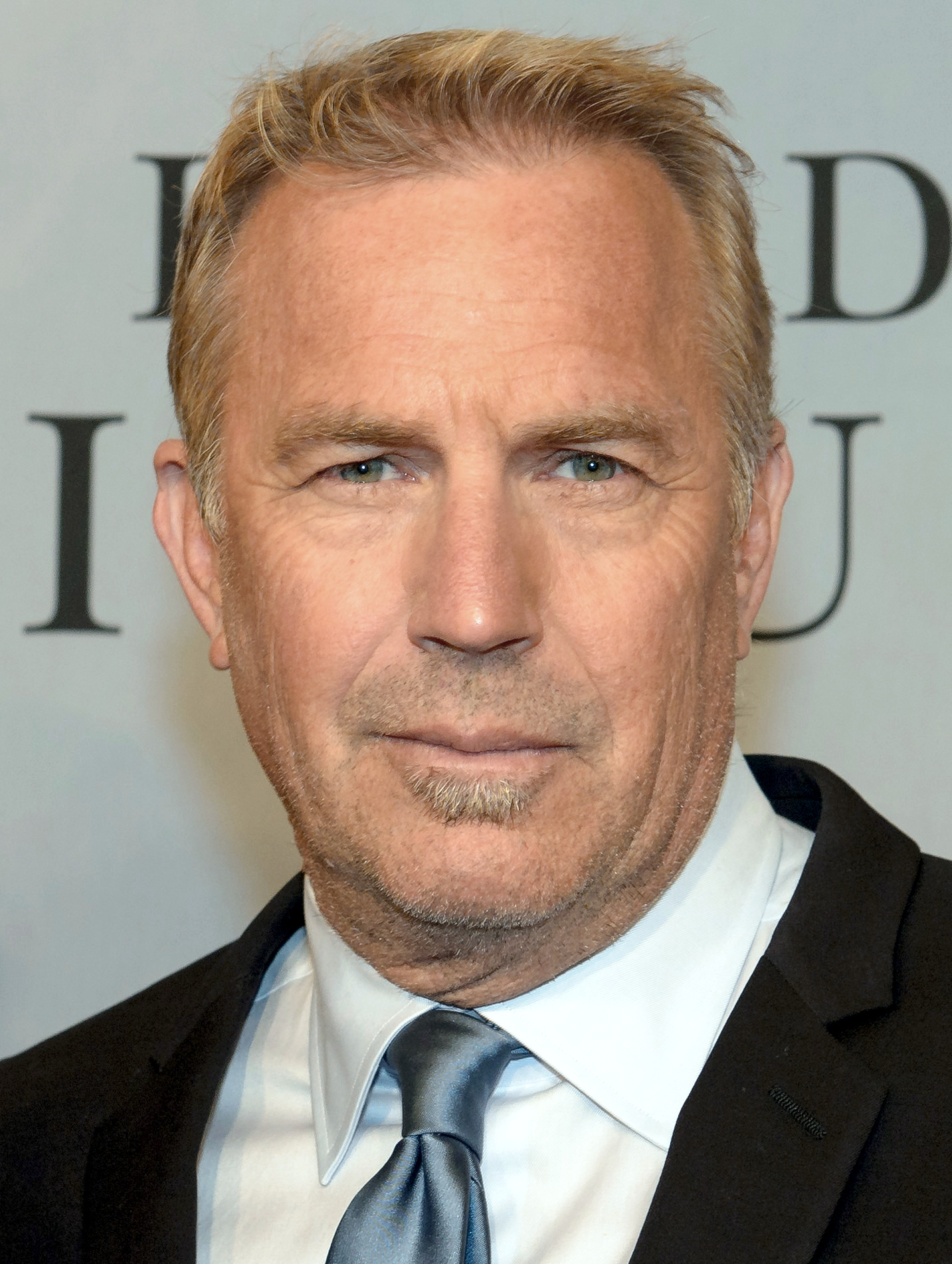
Costner in 2016

In August 2022, Costner began production on Horizon: An American Saga, a Western epic that will be split into at least four films, each just under three hours in length. Costner plans on the films being released over a series of months. Costner will both star in and direct the project and said the film was proposed as an event television series. Production on the first film was expected to last at least 220 days, but was completed by November 2022. Production of the next films was underway by May 2023. The first film, Horizon: An American Saga – Chapter 1, was released in June 2024, earning mixed reviews, and was a box office flop. The poor box-office returns of Chapter 1 was a factor in the indefinite delay of Chapter 2, which too had received mixed reviews after its debut at the 81st Venice International Film Festival. Chapter 2 was originally set for an August 16, 2024 release date. From May to June 2025, Costner hosted the eight-part documentary series Kevin Costner's The West on the History Channel.

A 2025 story from the Hollywood Reporter has indicated that production on Yellowstone was rife with power struggles and arguments, listing it among various other incidents that has marred Costner's reputation among colleagues in Hollywood.

== Other ventures ==
=== Country music ===
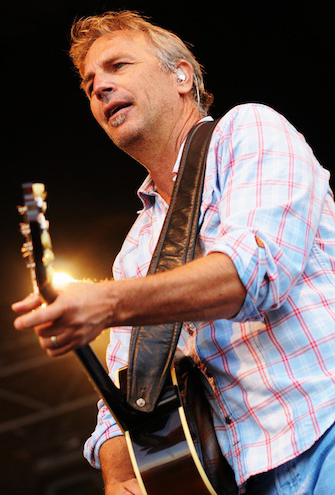
Costner on stage in July 2010

Costner is the singer in Kevin Costner & Modern West, a country rock band which he founded with the encouragement of his then wife, Christine. In October 2007, they began a worldwide tour, which included shows in Istanbul and Rome. The group also performed at NASCAR Sprint Cup Series races at Daytona International Speedway and Charlotte Motor Speedway in Concord, North Carolina.

The band released a country album, Untold Truths, on November 11, 2008, on Universal South Records. The album peaked at No. 61 on the Billboard Top Country Albums and No. 35 on the Top Heatseekers chart. Three singles ("Superman 14", "Long Hot Night", and "Backyard") have been released to radio, although none have charted. For the single "Superman 14" a live music video was made.

In 2009, they went on tour with opening act The Alternate Routes. In August, at the Big Valley Jamboree in Camrose, Alberta, Costner and the band were scheduled next on stage when a severe thunderstorm struck, causing the stage and stands on the main stage to collapse. One person was reported dead and forty injured. Later, an auction was held to raise money for the two young sons of the woman killed. A dinner with Costner was auctioned off for $41,000. Two guitars, one autographed by Costner, helped raise another $10,000 each.

A second Kevin Costner and Modern West album, Turn It On, was released in February 2010 in Europe and was supported by a European tour. In July 2012, the band performed in Halifax, Nova Scotia, at the 20th annual Telus World Skins Game in support of the IWK Health Centre Foundation, donating a guitar autographed by Costner.

Costner has also appeared in the documentary film Country Roads by Marieke Schröder.

The most recent album released by Kevin Costner and Modern West, Tales from Yellowstone, was written by Costner and his co-writers from the perspective of John Dutton, Costner's character on the hit TV series Yellowstone. Songs from the album were featured on Season 3 of the show.

=== Baseball ===
Several of Costner's films have included a baseball theme: Chasing Dreams, Bull Durham, Field of Dreams, For Love of the Game, and The Upside of Anger, in three of which his character is a pro baseball player and one a former pro baseball player.

Costner has a home in Austin, Texas, and sometimes appears at Texas Longhorns baseball practices and games. He was a close friend of former Longhorns baseball coach Augie Garrido from Garrido's days coaching at Cal State Fullerton, Costner's alma mater. He cast Garrido to play the role of the Yankee manager in For Love of the Game. He tries to attend every College World Series game that the CSUF Titans team plays in Omaha, Nebraska. Costner walked on for a tryout, but did not make the team early in his time at the university.

Costner was a partial owner of the Zion, Illinois-based Lake County Fielders independent baseball team in the North American League. The Fielders name was an homage to Field of Dreams, with the logo showing a ballplayer standing amid a field of corn. On August 12, 2021, he led the New York Yankees and Chicago White Sox onto the field prior to the MLB at Field of Dreams game held in Dyersville, Iowa and gave a short speech.

=== Business interests ===
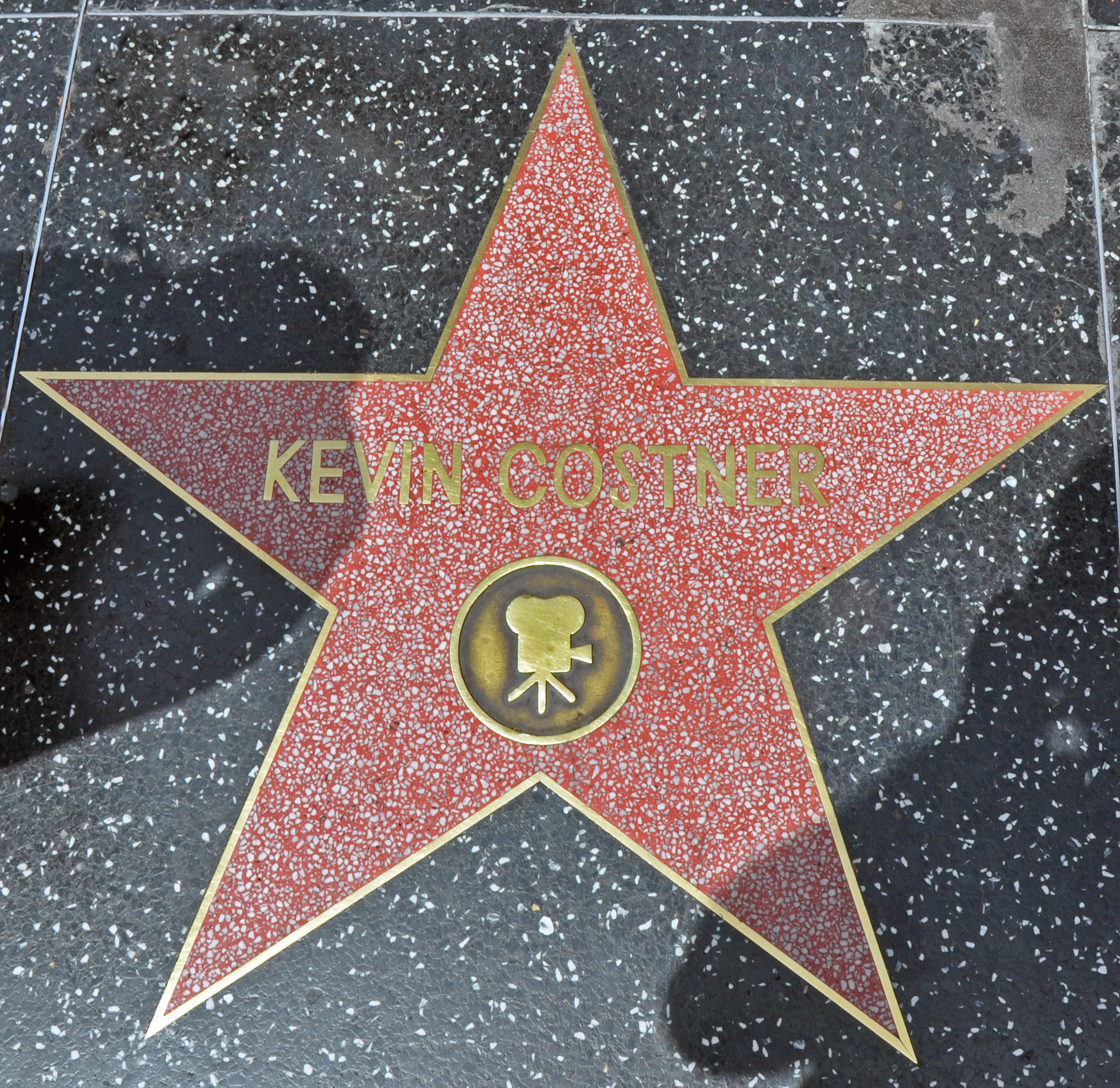
Costner's star on the Hollywood Walk of Fame

In 1995, Costner bought a company that was developing oil separation machines based on a patent he purchased from the US government. The machines developed by the company were of little commercial interest until the Deepwater Horizon oil spill, when BP took six of the machines from a company in which Costner owned an interest, Ocean Therapy Solutions, for testing in late May 2010. On June 16, 2010, BP entered into a lease with Ocean Therapy Solutions for 32 of the oil-water separation devices.

Although Spyron Contoguris and Stephen Baldwin had previously sold their interests in Ocean Therapy Solutions in mid-June to another investor in the company, they filed a lawsuit in Louisiana District Court claiming $10.64 million for securities fraud and misrepresentation. The suit claimed that Costner kept a meeting with BP secret from them, and the secret meeting resulted in an $18-million down payment on a $52 million purchase, and that after the down payment, but before any announcement, another investor used part of the down payment to buy out their shares, thus excluding them from their share of the profits from the total sale. The suit claimed that, despite public statements by Costner, Ocean Therapy Solutions, BP, and others to the contrary, Baldwin and Contogouris were told that BP was still testing the machines and had not yet committed to lease the machines from Ocean Therapy Solutions and that the other investor in Ocean Therapy Solutions purchased their shares for $1.4 million to Baldwin and $500,000, to Contogouris. In June 2012, a federal jury in Louisiana deliberated for less than two hours before rejecting Baldwin's and Contogouris' claims in the multimillion-dollar oil-clean-up case, and the court ordered Baldwin and Contogouris to reimburse Costner and the other defendants in the case for their costs.

On June 6, 2004, Costner opened Tatanka: The Story of the Bison one mile south of Deadwood, South Dakota, on U.S. Route 85, saying he hoped it would be an educational and emotional place for people to learn about America's westward expansion. Promoters stated in a news release that the $5-million attraction had a new, 3,800-square-foot interactive center featuring exhibits, retail, and food and beverage areas, offices, and a small theater. The visitor center features graphics and text about the bison and the relationship of the Plains Indians to the animals – historically hunting and now raising them for food and clothing, among other things. The centerpiece is a bronze sculpture depicting a buffalo jump by Hill City artist Peggy Detmers, depicting 14 bronze bison in the act of running from their pursuers and three bronze Lakota riders on horseback. Three of the massive bison are posed in midair, cascading over the face of a cliff. Costner commissioned the work in 1994 from Detmers. The five-fourths-scale bronzes, each weighing between 2,500 and 8,000 pounds, were cast at Eagle Bronze Foundry in Lander, Wyoming.

Costner opened the Midnight Star Casino and Restaurant in Deadwood, S.D., in 1991. He hired Francis and Carla Caneva to manage the establishment and gave each of them a 3.25 percent ownership and paid them salaries and bonuses. He terminated their employment in July 2004 and asked to agree to an amicable disassociation. When they declined, Costner dissolved the partnership and hired an accountant who determined its fair market value to be $3.1 million. The Canevas sued Costner to buy their shares based on twice that amount or sell the company on the open market. They won in the lower court but, on Costner's appeal, lost in the South Dakota Supreme Court. Costner closed the establishment in 2017 and sold it in 2020.

In 2020, Costner joined Woody Sears's new audio entertainment travel app, HearHere, as a co-founder, podcast narrator, and investor. Costner narrates some of the audio stories provided by the iPhone subscription app for travelers on road trips across the United States who want to hear about the people, places, and histories they are encountering on their travels.

=== Philanthropy ===
Costner serves on an honorary board for the National World War I Museum in Kansas City, Missouri. In spring 2011, he recorded two radio spots for the museum that were aired on Kansas City Royals Radio Network.

=== NASCAR ===
Costner was named ceremonial grand marshal of the NASCAR Cup Series' Auto Club 500 which took place on February 25, 2007, at the California Speedway. In 2008, he worked with the NASCAR Media Group and CMT Films to help produce the NASCAR Documentary The Ride of Their Lives which was released in December of that year. Costner would be the narrator for that documentary. Also in 2009, he was named the spokesman for NASCAR Day which took place on May 15. The next day, May 16, he and his country music band would perform in the infield of Charlotte Motor Speedway as well as participate as a judge in the 2nd annual Victory Challenge before the 25th Running of the NASCAR Sprint All-Star Race.

=== Writing ===
In 2015, Costner co-authored The Explorer's Guild: A Passage to Shambhala, a hybrid adventure novel and graphic novel, with John Baird, researcher Stephen C. Meyer, and illustrator Rick Ross.

Costner has a chapter giving advice in Tim Ferriss' book Tools of Titans.

== Personal life ==
=== Relationships ===
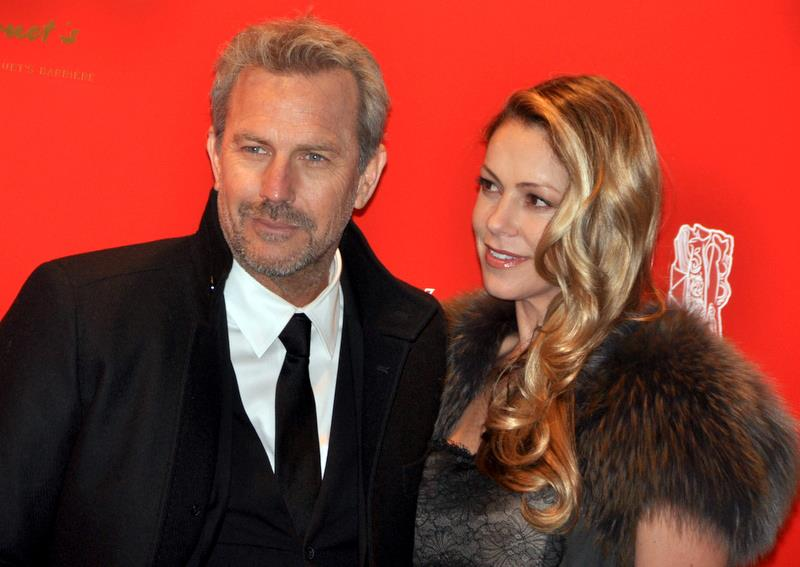
Costner and Baumgartner at the César Awards in 2013

In 1975, while in college, Costner started dating fellow student Cindy Silva, and they married three years later. During their marriage, they had two daughters born in 1984 and 1986, and a son born in 1988. The couple divorced in 1994 after 16 years of marriage, due to Costner allegedly having an affair while on the set of Waterworld. Cindy Silva received a settlement of $80 million (equivalent to $157 million in 2025).

Following his divorce, he had a brief relationship with Bridget Rooney, future wife of billionaire Bill Koch; Costner and Rooney had a son together, born in 1996. He then dated political activist Birgit Cunningham. In 1996, he lived with supermodel Elle Macpherson.

On September 25, 2004, Costner married his girlfriend of four years, model, and handbag designer, Christine Baumgartner, at his ranch in Aspen, Colorado. They have two sons, born in 2007 and 2009, and a daughter born in 2010. In May 2023, Baumgartner filed for divorce. They finalized their divorce on February 20, 2024.

=== Political activism ===
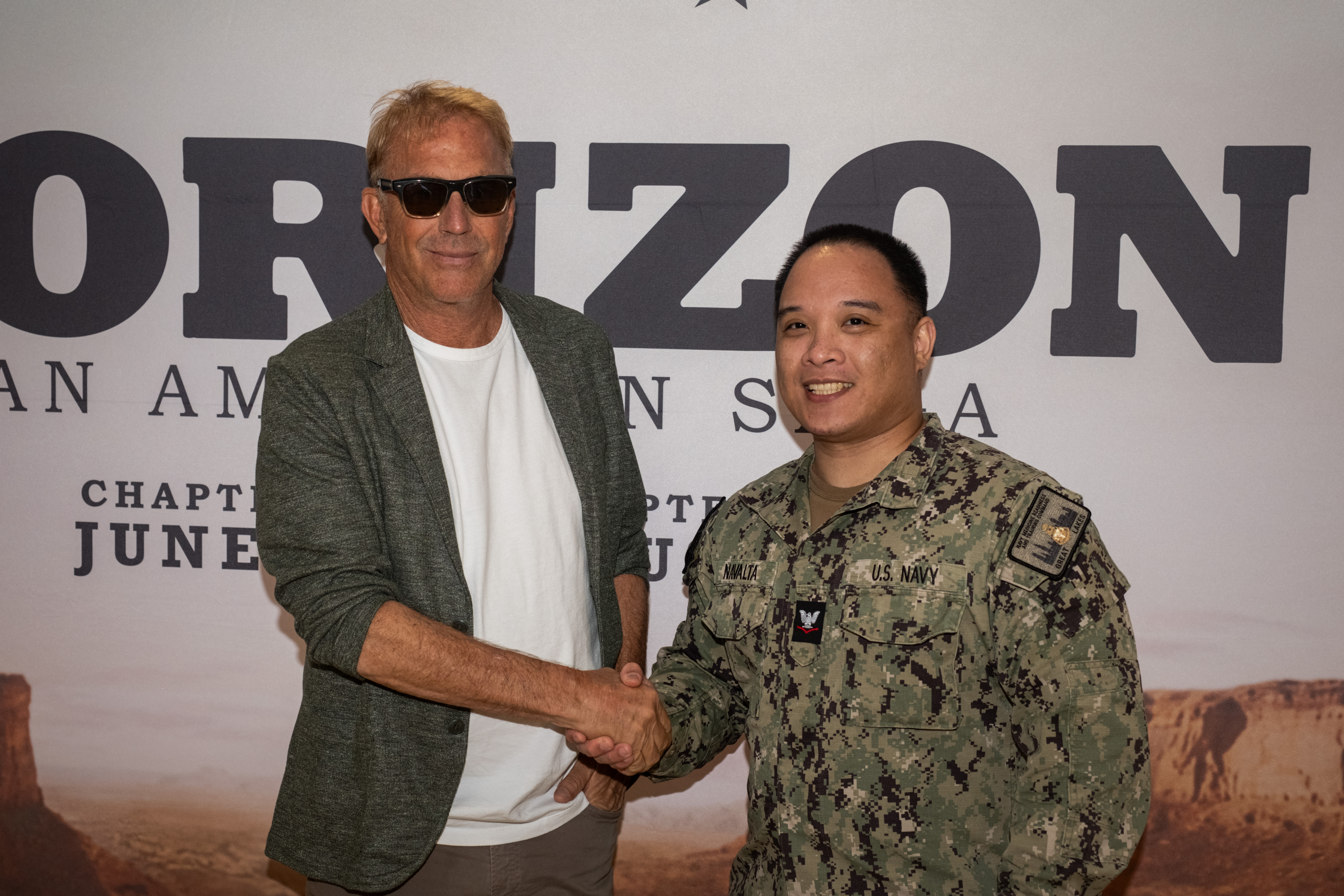
Costner shaking hands with a sailor in 2024

Early in his life, Costner was a Republican. He was both a supporter and friend of Ronald Reagan, frequently playing golf with the former president. He eventually switched his affiliation in the early 1990s. Since 1992, Costner has financially supported a variety of Democratic politicians, including Al Gore and Tom Daschle, but also made contributions to Republican Phil Gramm as late as 1995.

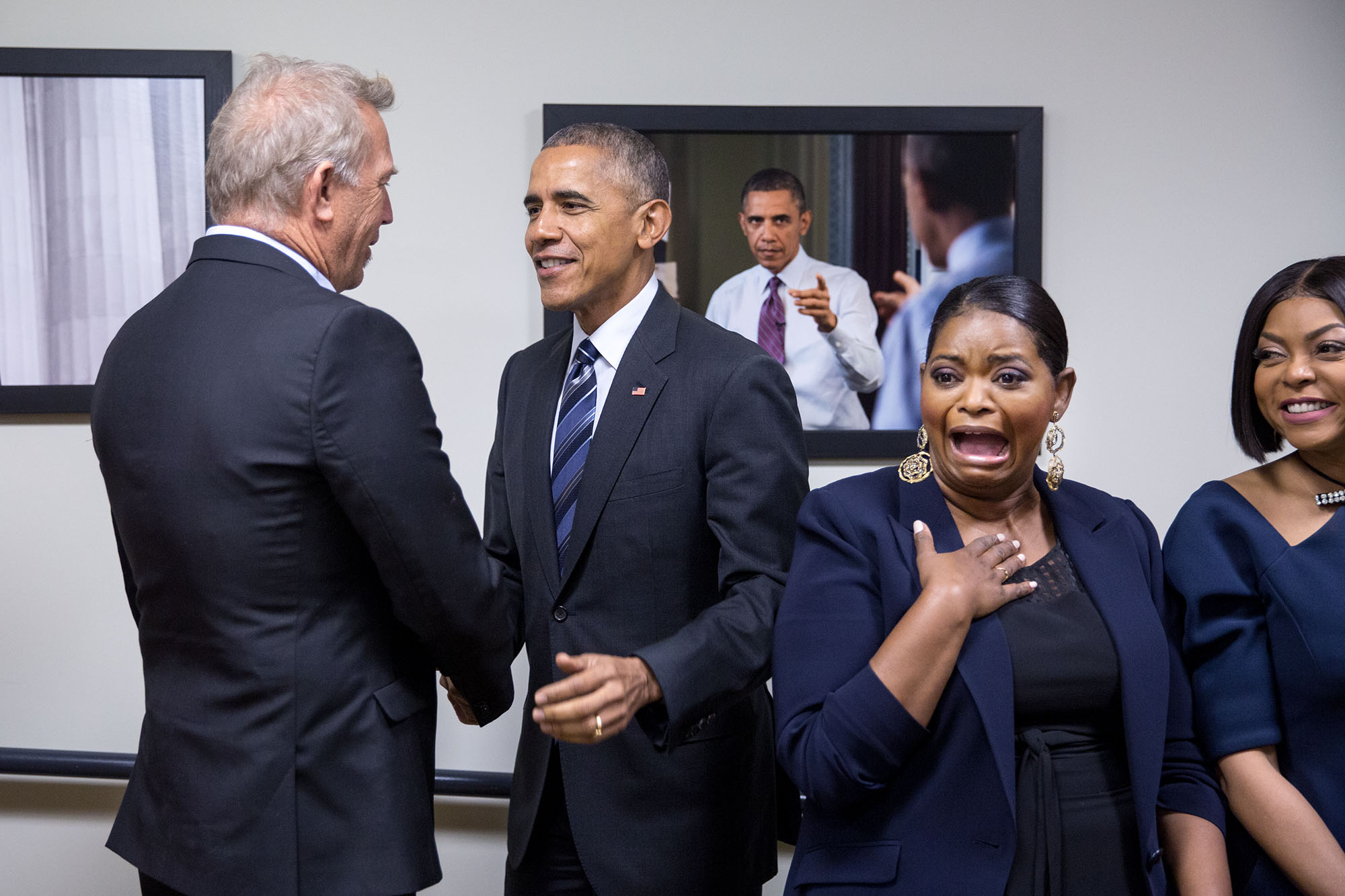
Costner (far left) shaking hands with President Barack Obama (second from left) in 2016

In 2008, he said publicly that he had no ambition to run for political office, adding "I've lived quite a colorful life". In the final days before that year's United States presidential election, Costner campaigned for Barack Obama, visiting various places in Colorado, where he has a home. In his speech, Costner stated the need for young voters to get to the polls, early, and with enthusiasm. "We were going to change the world and we haven't", Costner said at a Colorado State University rally. "My generation didn't get it done, and we need you to help us."

In October 2014, Costner sent a tribute to British troops serving around the world, thanking them for their work.

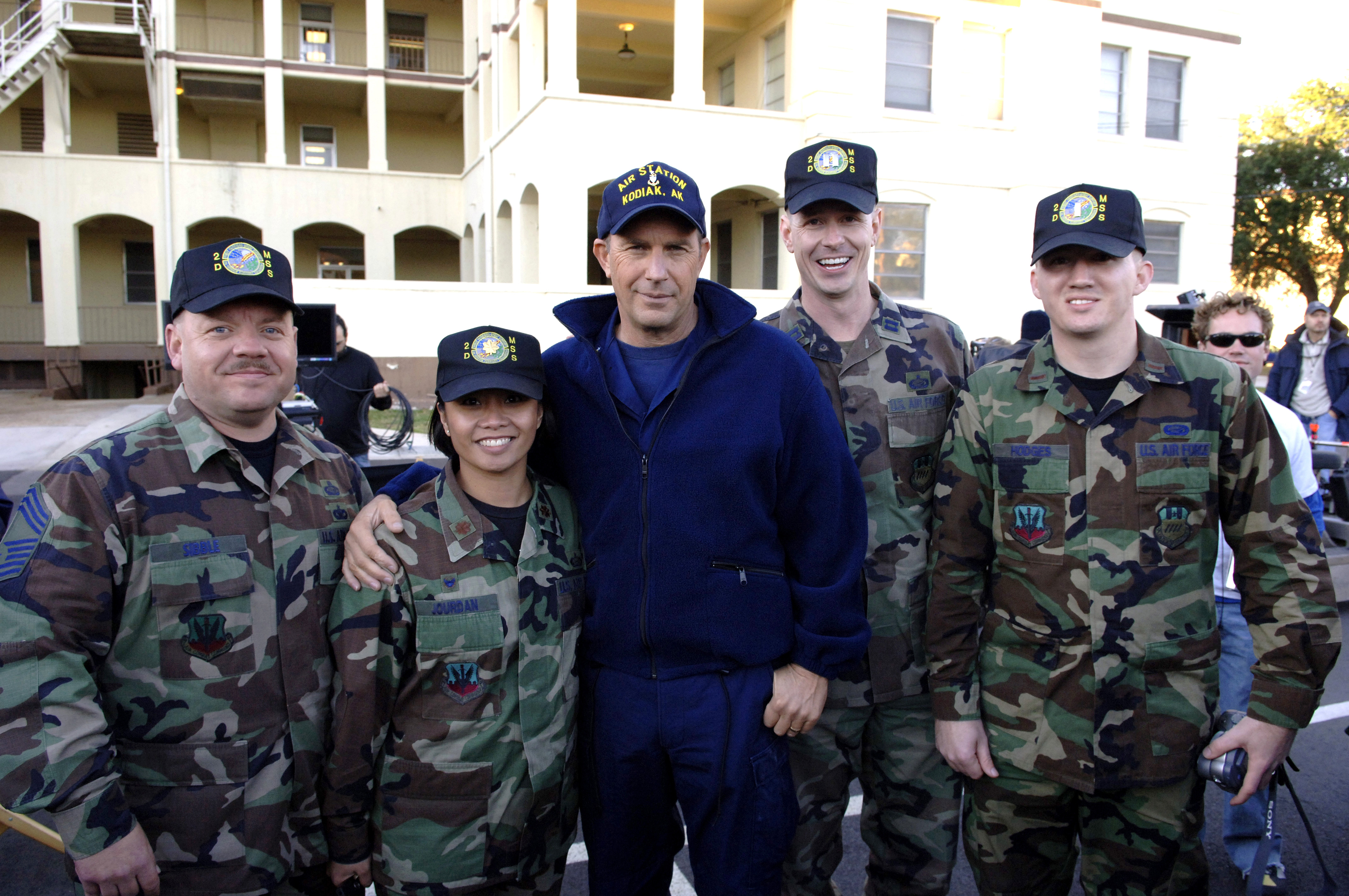
Costner with a group of U.S. Air Force airmen in 2006

On December 22, 2019, Costner endorsed Democratic presidential candidate Pete Buttigieg at a rally in Indianola, Iowa. Later, Costner supported Democratic candidate Joe Biden. Costner narrated a commercial for J. D. Scholten, a Democrat running for the U.S. House of Representatives from Iowa's 4th congressional district. For the 2022 United States House of Representatives election in Wyoming, Costner endorsed Republican Liz Cheney for reelection.

== Acting credits and accolades ==
Over Costner's career he has received numerous accolades including two Academy Awards for Best Picture and Best Director for Dances With Wolves (1990). He received three Golden Globe Awards for Dances with Wolves, Hatfields & McCoys (2012), and Yellowstone (2023). He also received a Primetime Emmy Award for Outstanding Lead Actor in a Limited or Anthology Series or Movie and two Screen Actors Guild Awards.

== Bibliography ==
- Costner, Kevin; Michael Blake; Jim Wilson (producer's notes); Diana Landau (1991). Dances with Wolves: The Illustrated Screenplay and Story Behind the Film. Newmarket Pictorial Moviebooks. Photographer: Ben Glass. New York: Newmarket Press. ISBN 9781557040886. OCLC 22450423.
- Costner, Kevin; Jonathan Baird; Stephen Meyer (2015). The Explorers Guild: Volume One: A Passage to Shambhala. Illustrator: Rick Ross. New York: Atria Books. ISBN 9781476727394. OCLC 926879500.
