= List of beach sports =

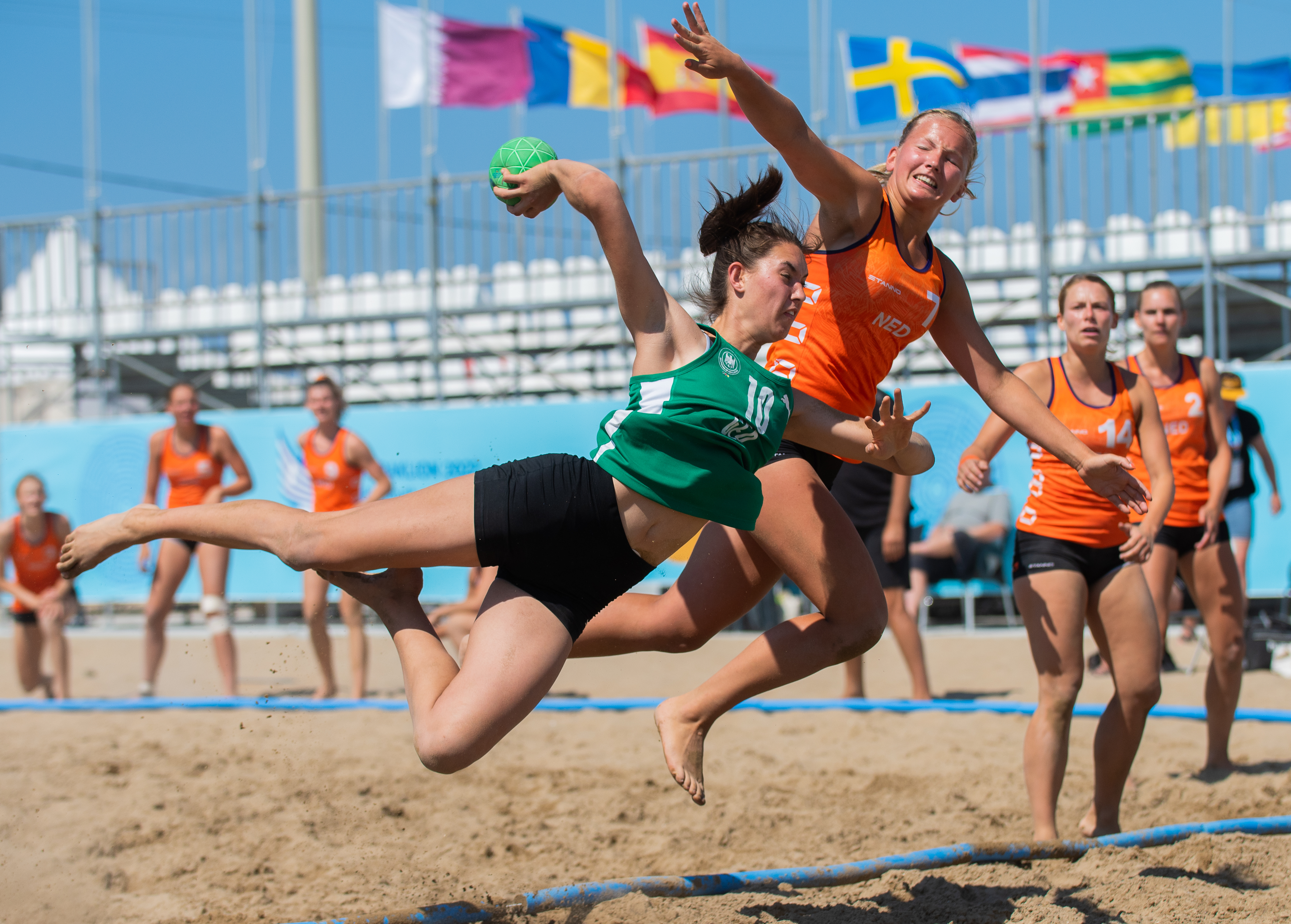
Beach handball

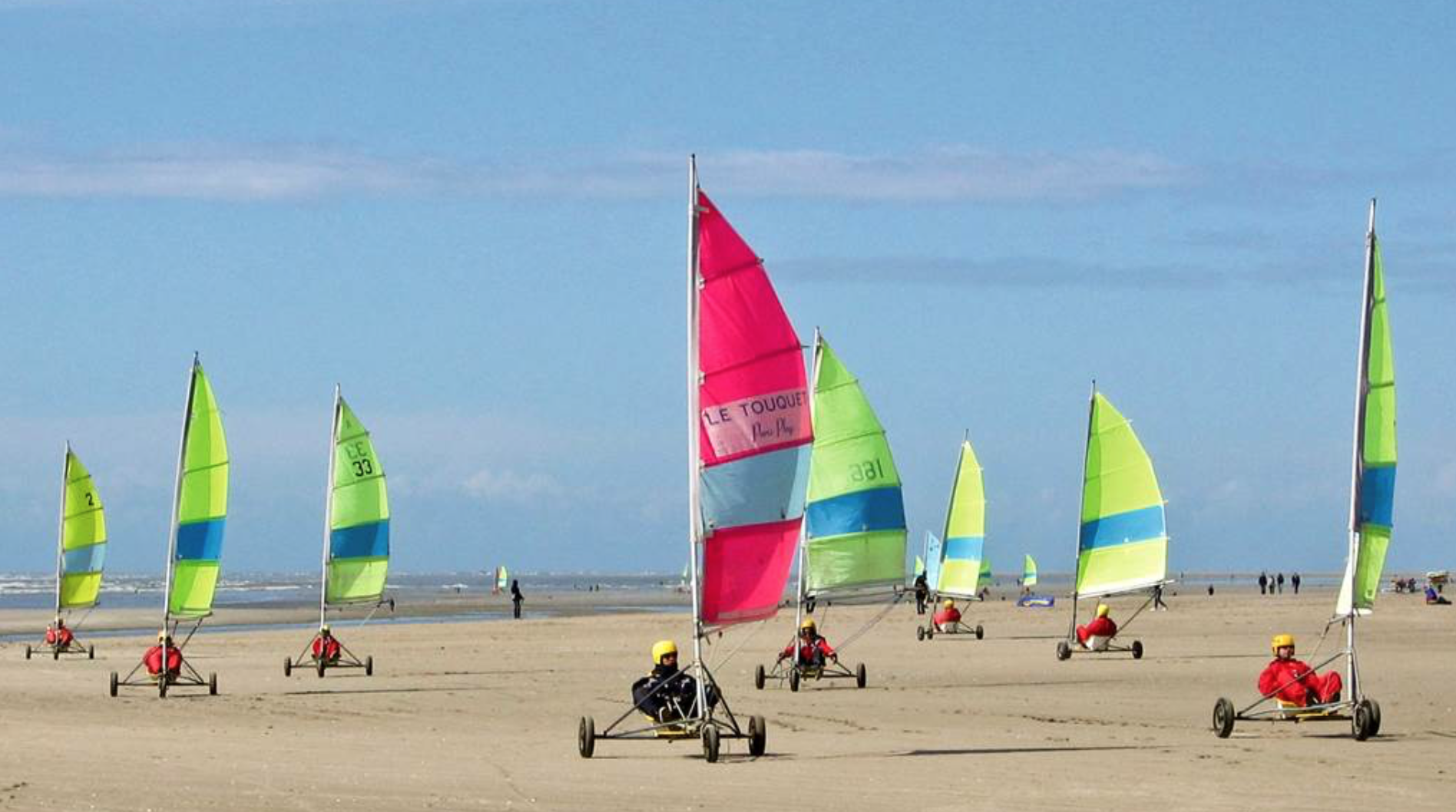
Sand yachting

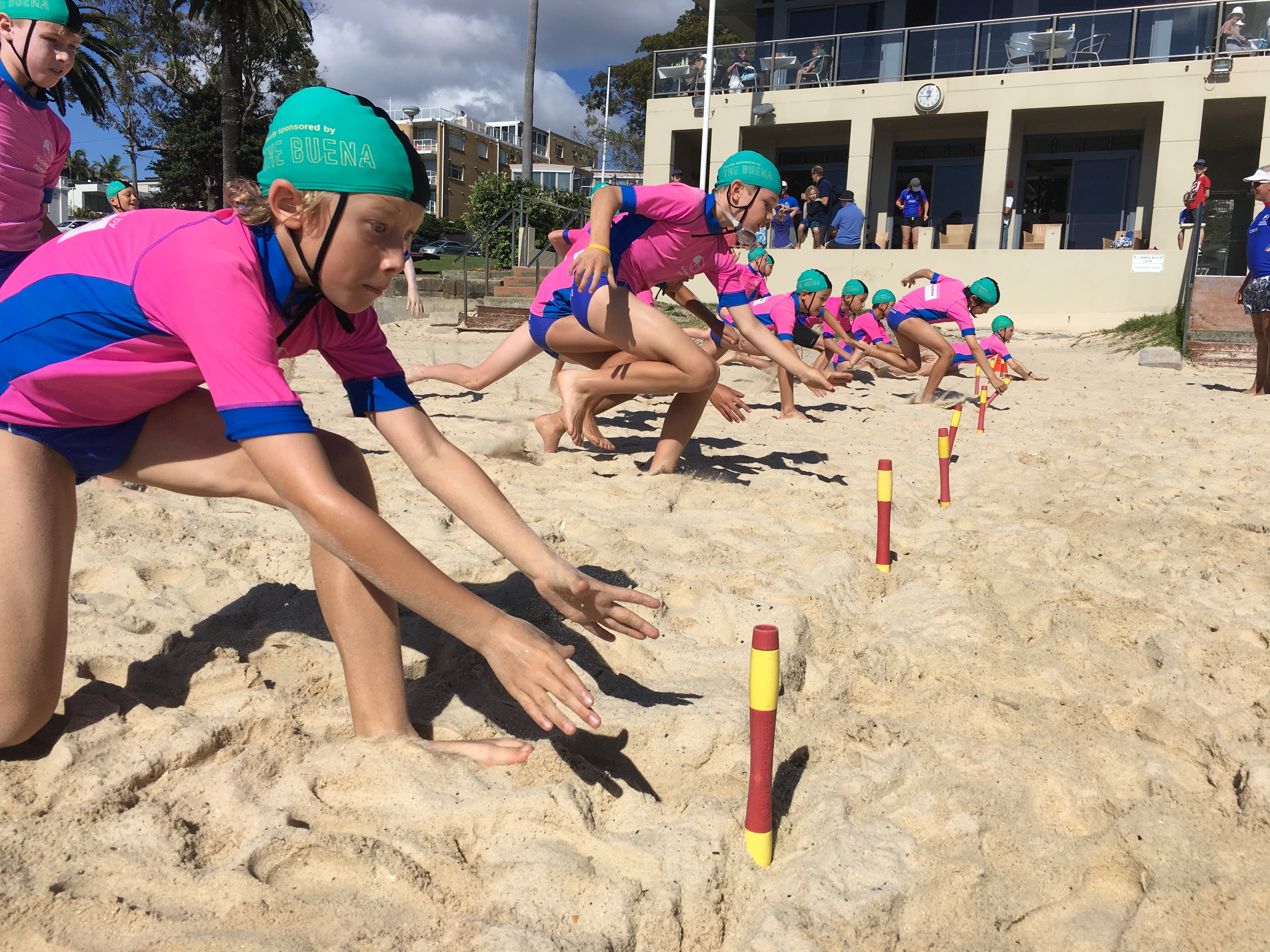
Beach flags

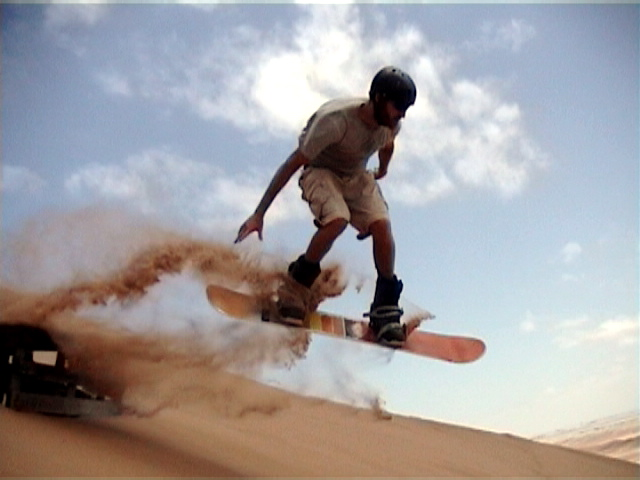
Sandboarding

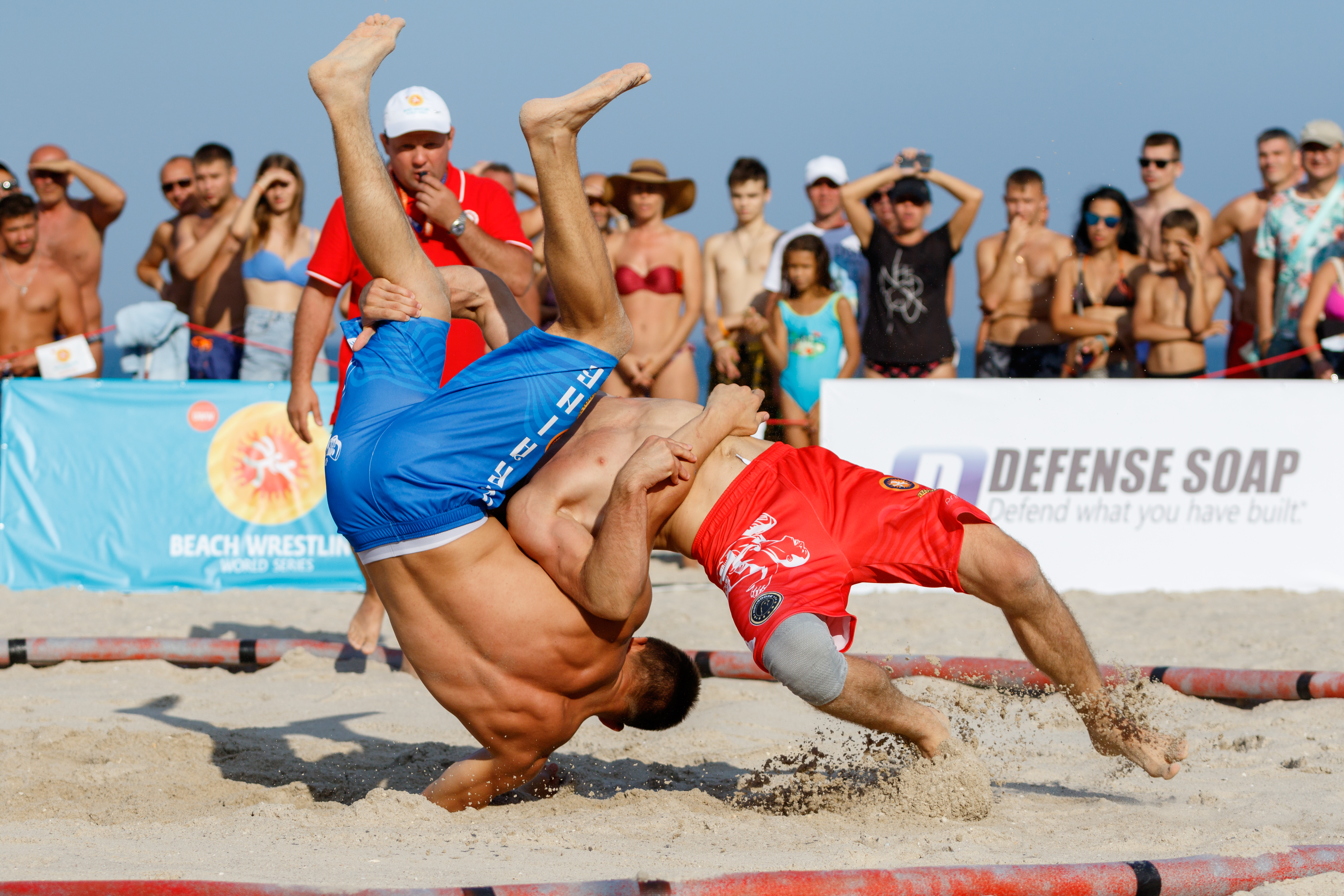
Beach wrestling

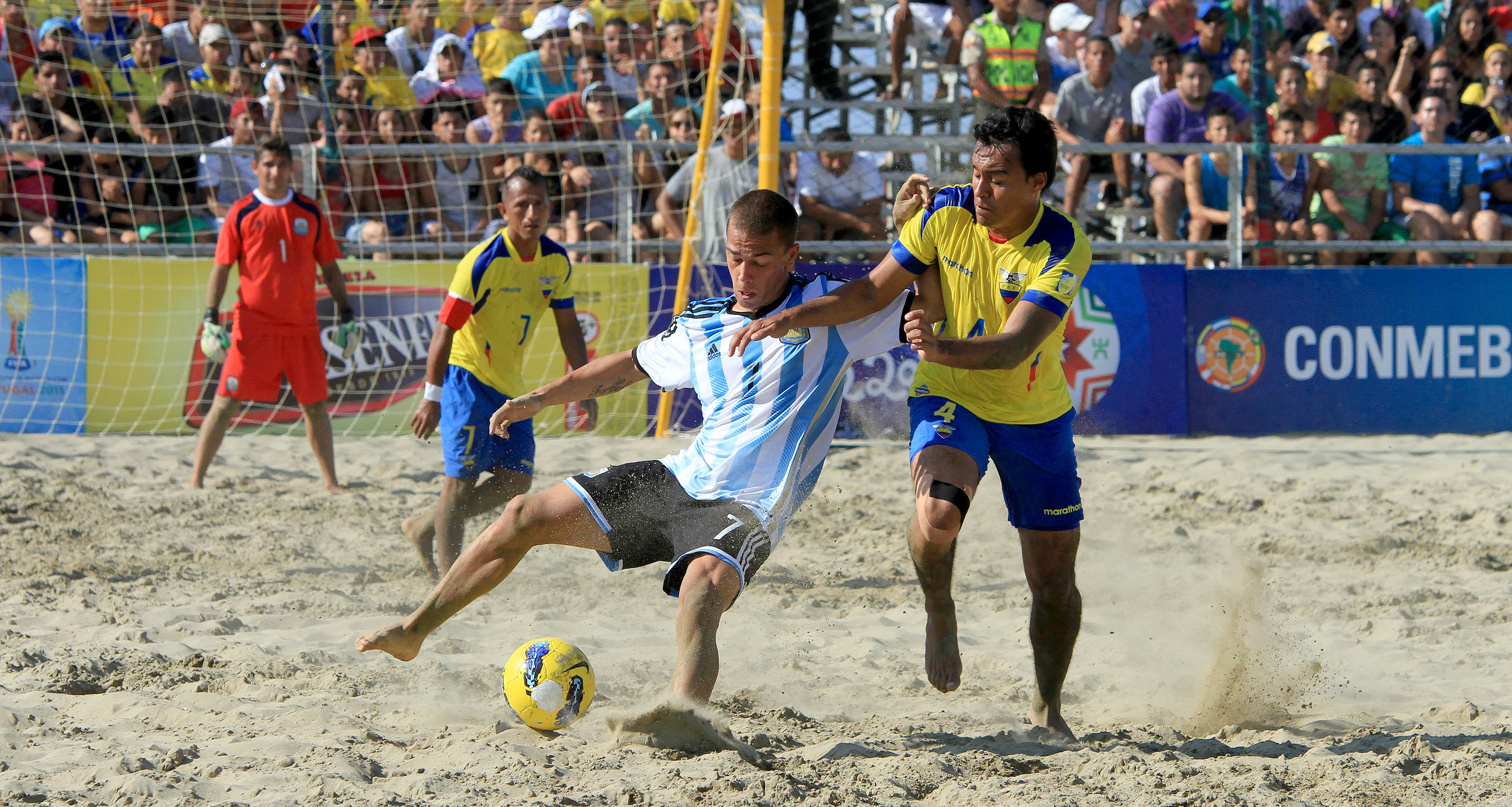
Beach soccer

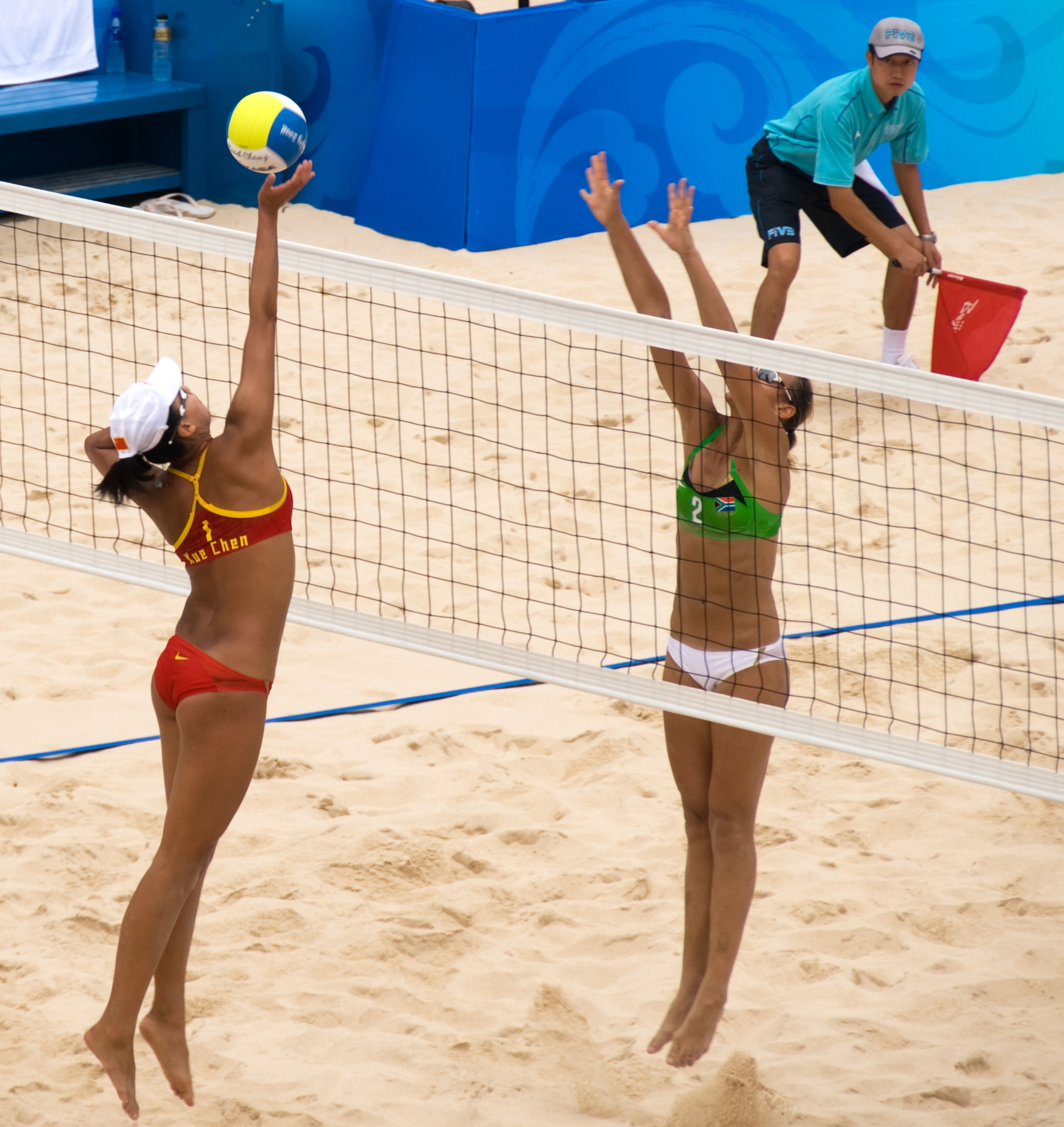
Beach volleyball

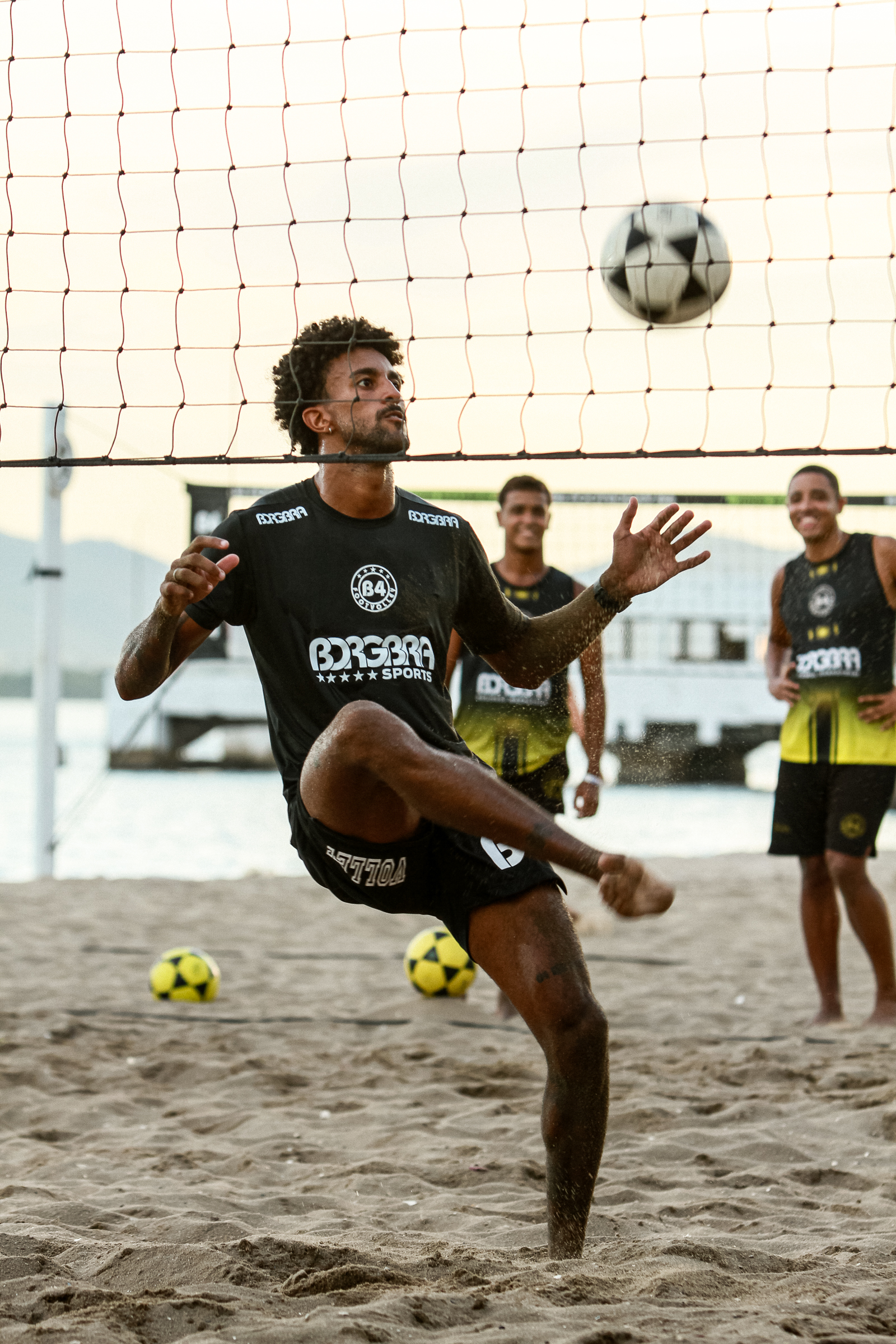
Footvolley

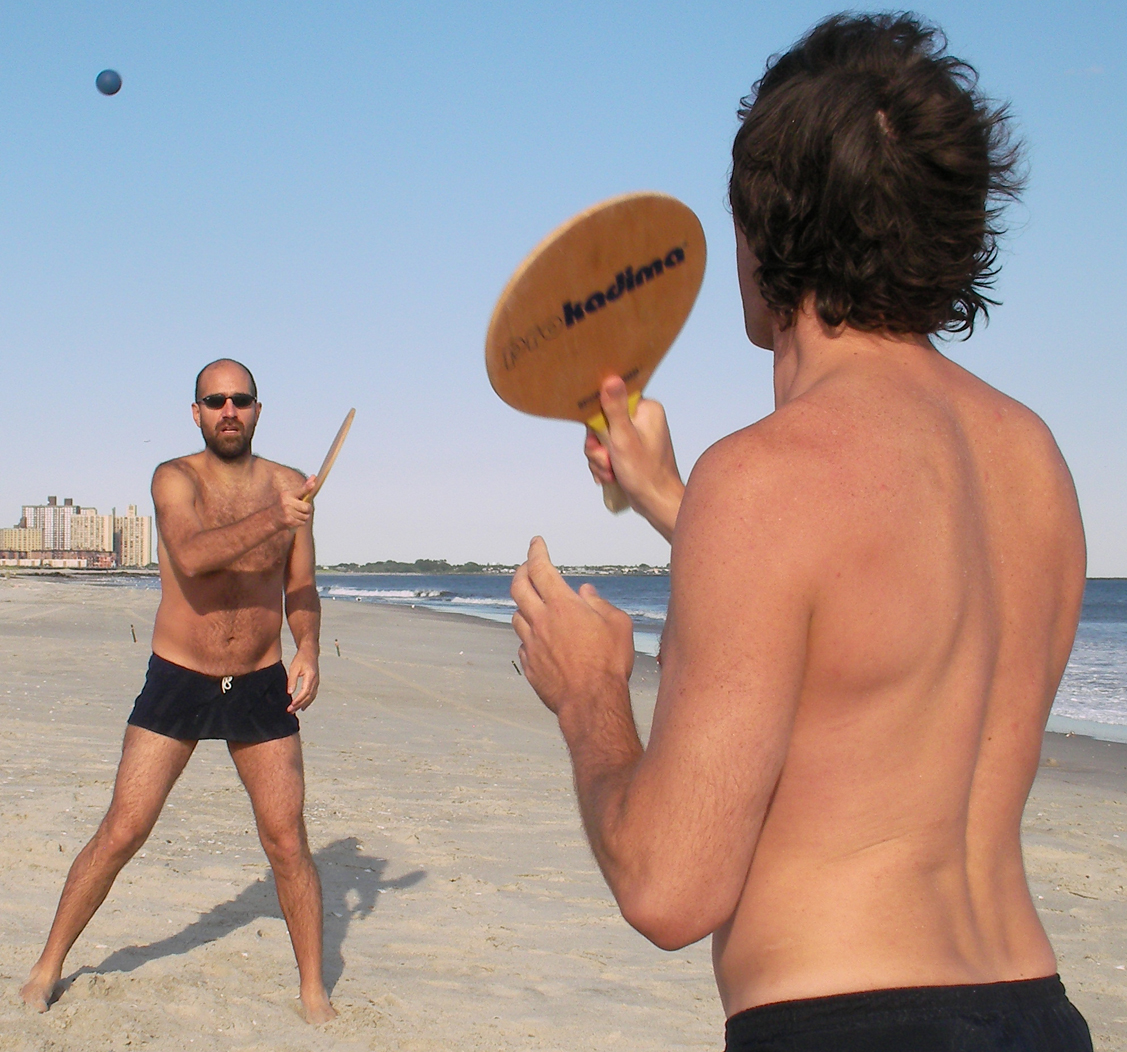
Frescobol/matkot

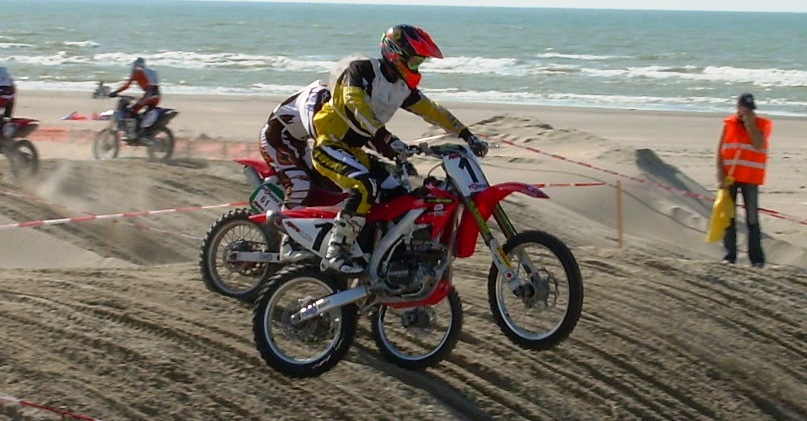
Beach racing

Beach sports are a classification of sport activities which are conducted on a sand surface. They are traditionally associated with being played on a natural, coastal sand beach, but also often take place on artificially constructed in-land playing fields using imported sand. Some beach sports are played on hard, compacted and smooth sand, whilst others are played on soft, loose and uneven sand; a handful are played on both.

Many are sand-based adaptations of sports already well established on other surfaces; most are played in smaller playing areas than their parent sports due to the more difficult and exhausting nature of traversing such a yielding terrain. The popularity and range of beach sports has experienced a notable rise since the emergence of pro beach volleyball as a successful commercial venture in the 1980s. Beach sports are practiced from a range of casual and non-competitive to professional-level competition.

The definition of beach sports is also frequently extended to include water sports conducted in an ocean or similar waterbody, overlooked by an adjacent beach which forms an integral part of the aesthetic and culture of such sports; this list excludes these.

== List of beach sports ==
This list is not intended to be exhaustive.

Most of the codified sports below are also frequently complemented by casual manifestations – typically impromptu, improvised, and loose interpretations of their, or their parent sports, rules and arrangements; self-declared versions of that sport for said session of play by its participants.

- Air badminton – derivative of badminton, intended to be played outdoors using a modified shuttlecock on non-conventional surfaces, including sand.
- Beach basketball – derivative of basketball; various permutations and magnitude of departure from parent sport depending on the organising body (sometimes played with one, neutral, backboard-less hoop), but all without dribbling due to the nature of the playing surface and therefore relaxed rules on travelling.
- Beach cricket – derivative of cricket, almost always informally played, with improvised, on the fly rules. However, most games involve no teams (it's the batter versus everyone else and therefore unlimited participants), the batter being obliged to run on any sort of hit, and a hit into the sea being six and out. Usually played on firm sand to aid bowling, using a tennis ball.
- Beach flag football – derivative of flag football (itself a derivative of American football), similar to parent sport but played barefoot, four-a-side, with shorter match lengths and less time for the quarterback to release the ball after the snap.
- Beach flags – Australian lifesaving activity to practice sprinting across soft sand; competitors run towards a limited set of flags wedged into the sand a distance away in an attempt to retrieve one (the concept operates very similar to musical chairs, eliminating one competitor per round by reducing the available flags each time until there is a winner).
- Beach golf – derivative of golf, with a major emphasis on treating all objects present as obstacles (e.g. deckchairs, bathers etc.); a soft polyurethane ball is used to prevent injuries to other beach users.
- Beach handball – derivative of handball, played outdoors with half as many outfield players and virtually no dribbling due to the nature of the playing surface. Matches are contested as best-of-three sets affairs, with the third played as a tiebreaking shootout if needed; extra points are awarded for speciality goals.
- Beach hockey – derivative of field hockey, played five-a-side with a larger ball and using sticks with holes in to allow the sand to pass through; goals are allowed to be scored from anywhere.
- Beach motorsport racing – derivative of motocross; very similar to parent sport but held on tracks marked out on beaches and/or sand dunes, often with the inclusion of man-made sand-jumps.
- Beach polo – derivative of polo; rules operate very similar to parent sport but is played in an enclosed arena with an inflated ball rather than a solid one and with one or two fewer players.
- Beach rugby – derivative of rugby union, usually played six-a-side with a smaller ball and just one point awarded per try; matches are only 10 minutes long and notably lack key features of parent sport such as scrums, line-outs and goalposts.
- Beach soccer – derivative of association football on soft sand, played five-a-side with rolling substitutions, using a lighter ball to be struck barefooted and no offsides. Matches are divided into three 12-minute periods; the clock counts down to zero and is stopped while play is inactive due to fouls and injuries. Matches always end with a winner, going to a penalty shootout if necessary.
- Beach tennis – derivative of lawn tennis, played entirely through volleys due to the ball being unable to bounce on sand; the ball is more depressurized than usual to cause it to travel more slowly and allow for longer rallies. The net is also raised much higher; beach volleyball courts are typically used for play. Solid paddle bats are typically used, rather than stringed tennis rackets.
- Beach ultimate – derivative of ultimate frisbee; rules operate very similar to parent sport but most notably is played with fewer players (usually five-a-side, sometimes four).
- Beach volleyball – derivative of volleyball played outdoors on soft sand, using a slightly larger and lighter ball, typically in two teams of two or occasionally four without substitutes, and best of three sets rather than five. Beach attire is a core aesthetic. Currently the only Olympic beach sport.
- Beach wrestling – a stand-up style of wrestling, no ground fighting takes place; three-minute matches, first to three points wins, whereby one point is awarded for a takedown or forcing the opponent out of the circle and three points for putting the opponent on their back. It takes place outdoors within a seven-metre diameter sand circle; participants wear beach attire or swimwear.
- Boules – usually a form of pétanque played recreationally by beach-goers in a party game-like fashion on soft or hard sand, frequently with specially, popularly derived coloured plastic balls.
- Footvolley – derivative of beach volleyball, in which players are only allowed to use their feet to touch the ball; a football is also used in place of a volleyball.
- Frescobol – played with solid, traditionally wooden rackets; typically between two players, the non-competitive aim is to maintain an airborne rally with a small rubber ball for as long as possible.
- Kite buggying – participants sit in a one-seater, three-wheeled, powerless buggy while flying a power kite in front of them to move and steer the vehicle across firm sand.
- Kite landboarding – based on kitesurfing, participants ride a mountainboard while flying a kite to pull them across firm sand, typically performing tricks similar to skateboarding, both on the ground and aerially; the latter is possible as participants are able to momentarily pull themselves a few metres into the air using the power of the kite's lift.
- Matkot – virtually identical to Frescobol described above, but played with louder, hollower and rounder rackets; the Israeli sport pre-dates its Brazilian counterpart by thirty years.
- Neppis – involves moving a small model car around a miniature race track built into sand by tapping it with a finger; each player takes turns to "nep" their car and the first to cross the finish line wins.
- Roundnet – adapted from volleyball, two teams of two surround a small circular trampoline-like net placed on the ground and alternate returning a ball to their opponents via bouncing it off the net within three touches; failure to do so rewards opponents with a point. Played on multiple surfaces, frequently including sand.
- Sand yachting – like water sailing, but conducted across firm sand in a three (or sometimes four) wheeled vehicle powered by wind through the use of a sail, and steered by pedals or hand levers; typically involves racing.
- Sandboarding – comparable to snowboarding, in which participants attempt to traverse across or down a sand dune while standing freely, or strapped onto, a sandboard.

== Beach multi-sport events ==
The worldwide growth of beach sports has given birth to multiple Olympic-style multi-sport events dedicated in large part to beach sports competition (water sports are also usually included).

The following lists major international beach multi-sport events:

Global

- World Beach Games (established by ANOC in 2019)

Regional

- African Beach Games (established by ANOCA in 2019)
- Asian Beach Games (established by the OCA in 2008)
- Bolivarian Beach Games (established by ODEBO in 2012)
- Mediterranean Beach Games (established by the CIJM in 2015)
- South American Beach Games (established by ODESUR in 2009)

== See also ==
- List of ball sports
- List of equestrian sports
- List of racket sports
- List of rural sports and games
- List of water sports
- List of winter sports
- Outdoor recreation
