= Triple Crown of Polo =

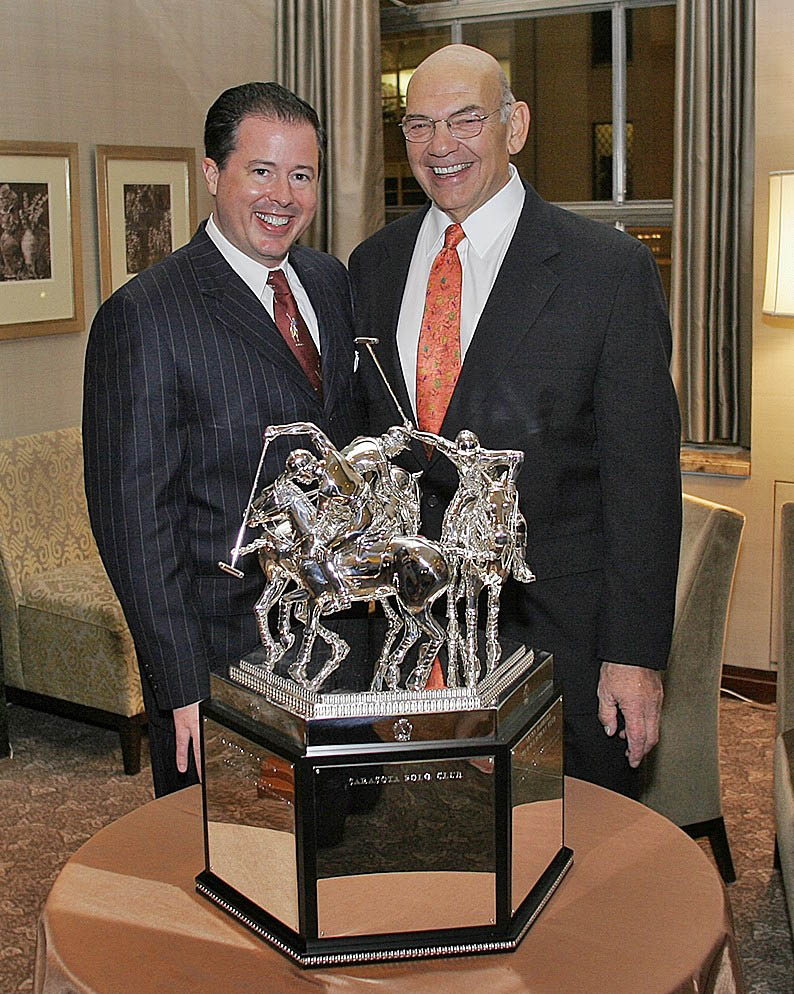
David McLane, ESPN executive James Allegro, and the Triple Crown of Polo trophy

'Triple Crown of Polo', started in 2006, is an ESPN2 television series exhibiting the top-level league of American polo. Started by David McLane, known for Women of Wrestling, Gorgeous Ladies of Wrestling, and Pro Beach Hockey, the show features three of the top tournaments in the country to appeal to the affluent polo fan.

The tournament's stops included the Sarasota Polo Club in Sarasota, Florida, the Las Colinas Polo Club in Dallas, Texas, and the Santa Barbara Polo Club in Santa Barbara, California the first year in 2006, and Sarasota, Santa Barbara and the New Bridge Polo and Country Club in Aiken, South Carolina since 2007.

The program was sponsored by luxury car manufacturer Lexus. It offered a Tiffany trophy delivered in a Brinks security truck that was followed to the venue by helicopter. Through ESPN's various international networks, the show was seen in 129 countries.

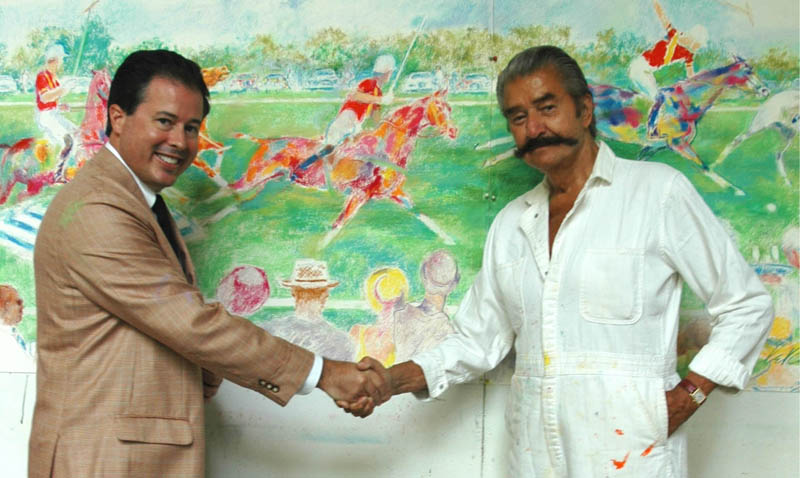
David McLane and LeRoy Neiman with his Triple Crown of Polo mural

LeRoy Neiman was the official artist of Triple Crown of Polo, creating ten portraits of the action.
