= David McLane =

American wrestling promoter

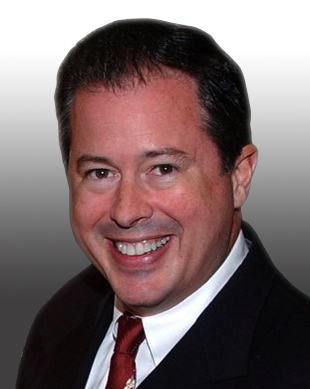
- Education: Indiana University (BA, BS)
- Occupations: Wrestling promoter; businessman
- Years active: 1986–present
- Known for: Gorgeous Ladies of Wrestling (GLOW); Powerful Women of Wrestling (POWW); Women of Wrestling (WOW); Pro Beach Hockey; World Roller Hockey League; World Wrestling Association (WWA); Triple Crown of Polo (TCP)

David B. McLane is an American businessman, known primarily as a wrestling promoter and television producer. He is the founder of the wrestling promotions Gorgeous Ladies of Wrestling (GLOW) and Women Of Wrestling (recognized as WOW! and WOW), both nationally syndicated series. He also created the ESPN series of the World Roller Hockey League, Pro Beach Hockey and the Triple Crown of Polo. Each aforementioned program is a property under his company banner David McLane Enterprises, Inc.

== Early life ==
McLane grew up watching professional wrestling on television with his older brothers and attended live events in his hometown of Indianapolis. As a teenager he launched the Dick the Bruiser Fan Club, selling photographs of the wrestling star and other local professional wrestlers through mail order. Bruiser brought McLane in to work in the office of Bruiser's Indianapolis-based wrestling promotion World Wrestling Association (WWA). There he learned the ropes of promotion and marketing, eventually became the ring announcer and match commentator. McLane attended Park Tudor School (class of 1979) and Indiana University in 1980.

While continuing to work for the WWA, McLane started his own promotional company to promote live events and concerts throughout the Midwest, including the stadium presentation of the Budweiser Country Concert Tour and marketing of such groups as New Edition in select markets.

== GLOW-Gorgeous Ladies of Wrestling (1986-1992) ==
McLane began the first-ever all women's wrestling television program in 1986, the Gorgeous Ladies of Wrestling (GLOW). GLOW was a syndication ratings success, achieving superior ratings to the WWF's syndicated Superstars series, which launched at the same time and was frequently shown in adjacent timeslots on the same stations. Shot in a showroom at the Riviera Hotel and Casino in Las Vegas, the show garnered a cult following. McLane served as the ring announcer, solo play by play announcer and owner of the company.

The strong cult following led Netflix to produce GLOW (TV series) based on McLane's original creation. The series, produced by Orange is the New Black creator Jenji Kohan launched on June 23, 2017. Netflix's second season of GLOW was released for streaming on June 29, 2018.

== Roller Hockey ==
After selling GLOW, McLane partnered with ESPN for the creation of the World Roller Hockey League (WRHL) in 1992, the first made-for-television roller hockey league in the United States. He arranged for these events to be sponsored by Franklin Sports and Walt Disney World, where the resort staged the events from its MGM Studios grounds. McLane merged the WRHL with another roller hockey start-up, Roller Hockey International, and introduced Pepsi and Taco Bell to this niche sports marketplace through a league sponsorship.

In 1997, McLane again partnered with ESPN to create Pro Beach Hockey (PBH), with over 156 hours of original programming for ESPN. By holding the events at a beach venue, he got the sport out of enclosed arenas and into a more accessible open air environment. The presentation has been compared to the X Games.

== WOW-Women of Wrestling (2000-present) ==
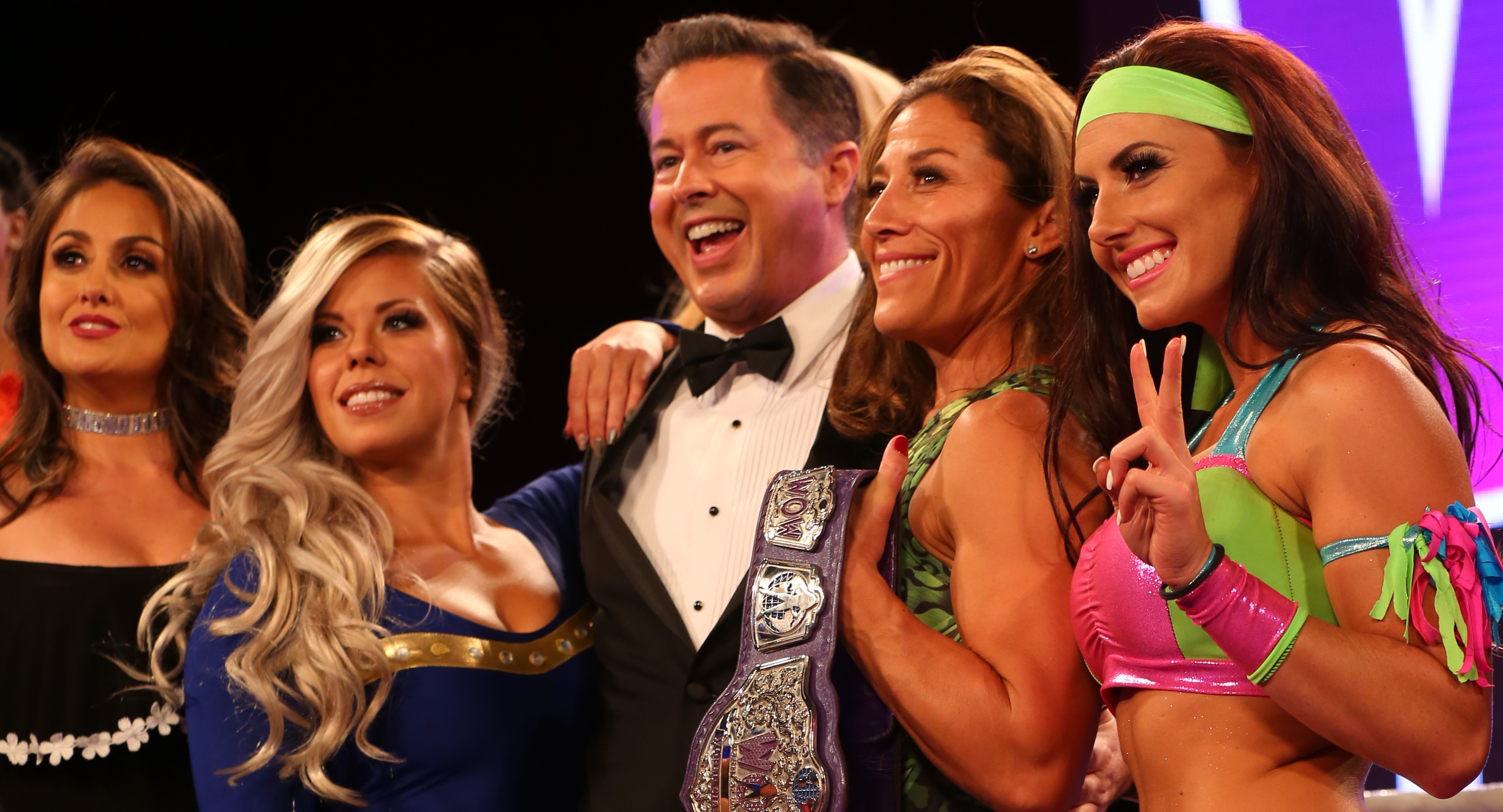
David McLane surrounded by WOW! Superheroes: Sophia Lopez, Attorney at Law and Abilene Maverick on his right; Jungle Grrrl with the WOW Championship belt and Santana Garrett on his left

In 2000, McLane ventured back to his passion of women's wrestling and created the WOW!-Women Of Wrestling television series. Shot at the Great Western Forum, WOW! was syndicated in 100 markets, becoming the number one rated syndicated wrestling program in the markets of New York City and Los Angeles.

McLane and his business partner, Jeanie Buss re-packaged WOW! in 2011 and aired its programs in select cities. Live events were staged in 2012 and 2013 in Las Vegas at the Eastside Cannery Casino and Hotel. In December 2014, WOW! announced their launch into digital media with a 2015 marketed platform as "WOW Superheroes".

New content was produced in 2016 from the Belasco Theater in Los Angeles for distribution on the company's [WOWE.com] website. On April 20, 2017, MGM Television Studios, headed by Mark Burnett formed a partnership with McLane and Buss to produce and distribute new content across a number of media platforms.

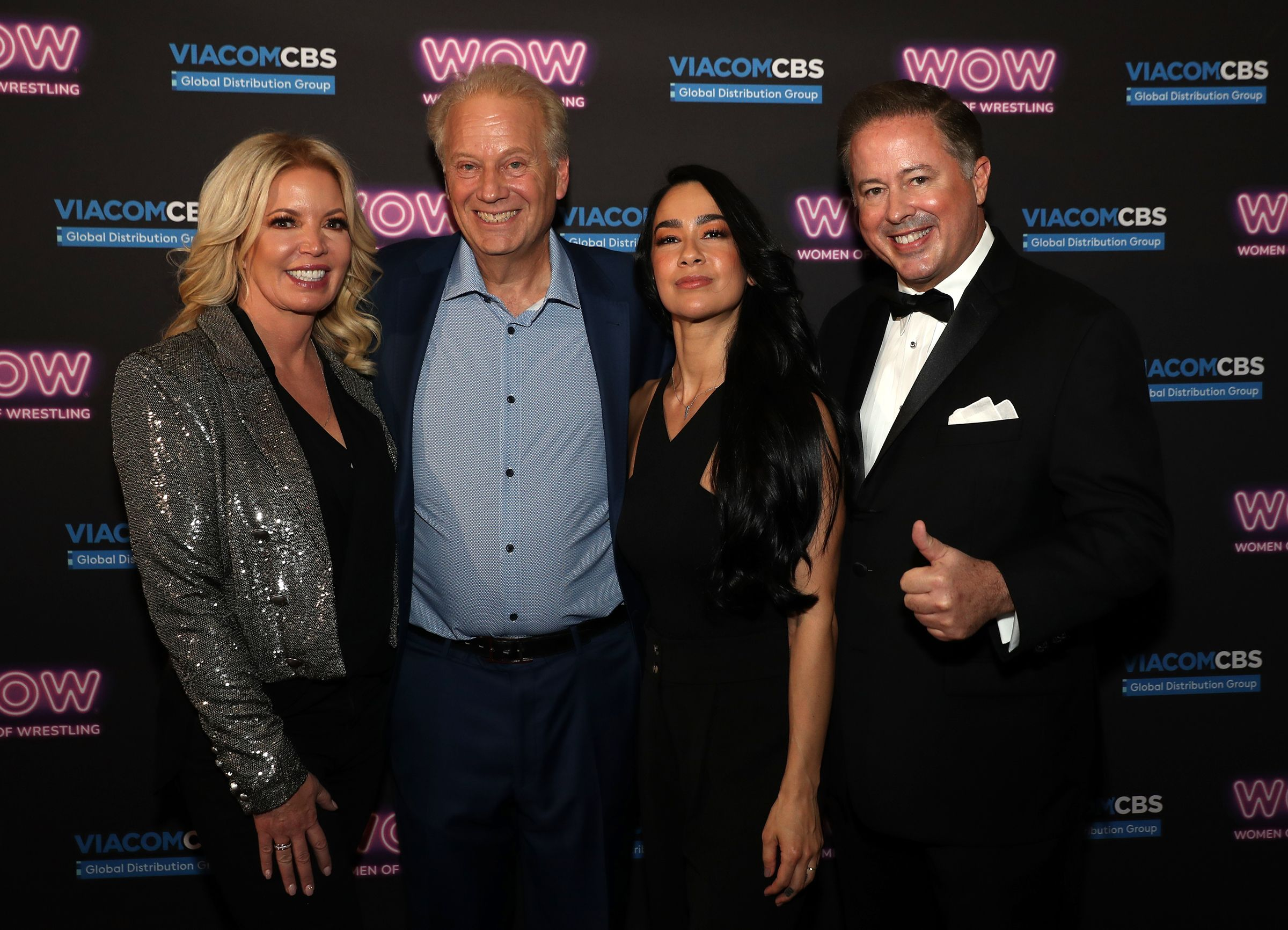
McLane (R) stands with Jeanie Buss (L), Dan Cohen, and AJ Mendez on October 6, 2021

On June 18, 2018, The Hollywood Reporter announced McLane and his business partners Jeanie Buss and Mark Burnett contracted with Mark Cuban's AXS TV for the broadcast of WOW live events commencing in early 2019. In summer of 2019 AXS TV CEO Andrew Simon announced in a live broadcast Women of Wrestling scored the highest ratings and social media engagement of any program in the 17 year history of the cable network.

On October 6, 2021, on top of the Circa Resort & Casino in Las Vegas, ViacomCBS Global Distribution President Dan Cohen, alongside McLane and WOW Executive Producers Jeanie Buss and AJ Mendez announced ViacomCBS had entered into a multi-year distribution agreement for WOW. For McLane this exclusive media rights deal gives WOW the biggest distribution opportunities for the U.S. and abroad in the history of women's professional wrestling.

== Polo ==
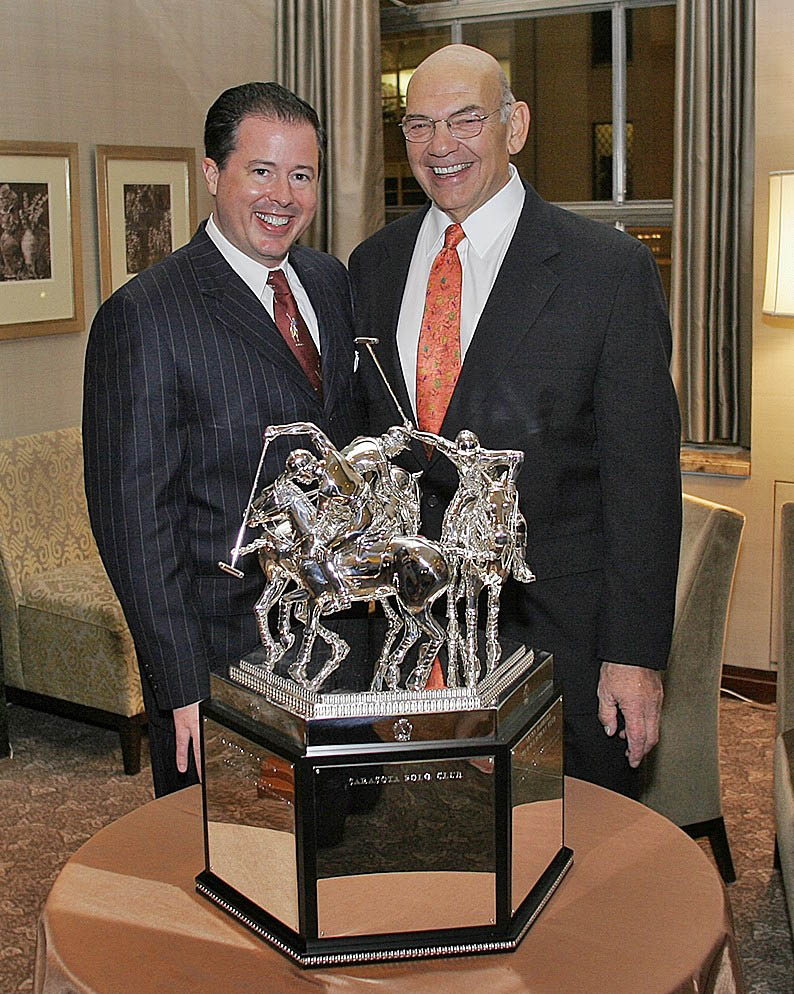
David McLane with ESPN Executive James Allegro and the Triple Crown of Polo trophy

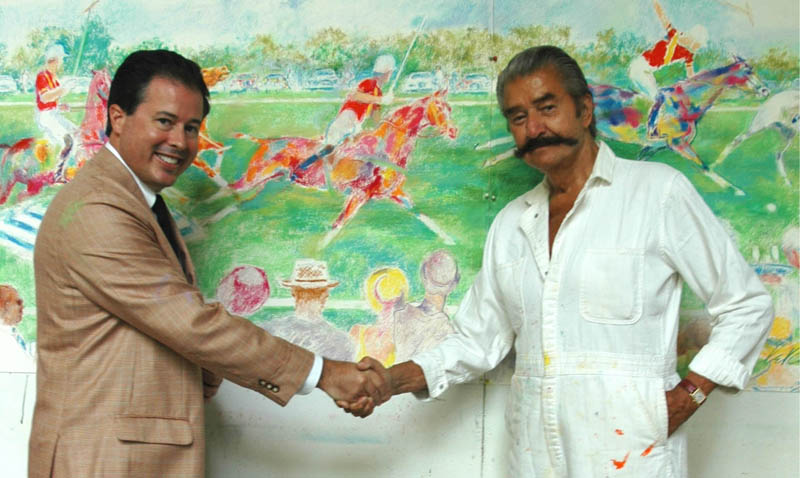
David McLane with artist LeRoy Neiman and his Triple Crown of Polo mural

In 2003, McLane developed another new venture with ESPN, the Triple Crown of Polo (TCP). The championship series was broadcast domestically on ESPN2 during weekends and internationally to 196 markets in twelve different languages by the ESPN International network through 2009. Marketing partnerships with high end sponsors Tiffany & Co. and Lexus helped propel the TCP to one of the most prestigious tournaments within the "Sport of Kings." In 2019, the Aspen Valley Polo Club hosted Team Audi defeating Team Flexjet to win the TCP season-finale.

In the last weekend of August 2021, fans attending the Aspen Valley Polo Club witnessed Team TonKawa headed by Jeff Hidebrand, Marc Ganzi, Gonzalito Pieres and Juan Bollini defeat Team NetJets by 9-8 in overtime to take the Aspen leg of the World Polo League Triple Crown of Polo.

== Marketing ==
With his history of taking products from concept to market, in 2008, McLane was retained by a start-up non-pharmaceutical/nutraceutical products company to manage its start up. Following the completion of clinical trials, McLane oversaw the entry of three products into the U.S. market through direct-response TV, online, and print media. The company's cornerstone product, an appetite suppressant, named Livea is patent pending and was endorsed by NBC's The Biggest Loser 3rd season runner-up Kai Hibbard.
