= LeRoy Neiman =

American painter and printmaker (1921–2012)

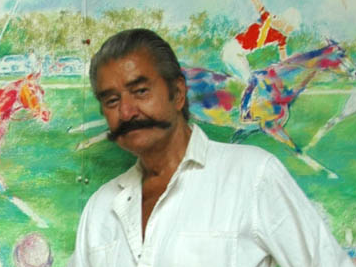
- Neiman in front of the mural he created for the Triple Crown of Polo
- Born: LeRoy Leslie Runquist; June 8, 1921; Saint Paul, Minnesota, U.S.
- Died: June 20, 2012 (aged 91); New York City, U.S.
- Resting place: Woodlawn Cemetery
- Education: School of the Art Institute of Chicago (BFA, 1950)
- Occupation: Painter
- Known for: Expressionist paintings
- Spouse: Janet Byrne

LeRoy Neiman (born LeRoy Leslie Runquist, June 8, 1921 – June 20, 2012) was an American artist known for his brilliantly colored, expressionist paintings and screenprints of athletes, musicians, and sporting events.

== Early life ==
Neiman was born in 1921 in Saint Paul, Minnesota, the son of Lydia Sophia (née Serline), of Braham, Minnesota, and Charles Julius Runquist, who were married in 1918 and lived in the city of Grasston, Kanabec County, Minnesota. He was of Turkish and Swedish descent ("as near as I can figure out", as he has said).

His father deserted his family, and when his mother married his stepfather, John L. Niman (Neiman) in 1926, LeRoy changed to the new surname as well. His mother divorced Neiman about 1935, and married for the third time in about 1940, to Ernst G. Hoelscher, of St. Paul. She died in St. Paul on November 14, 1985, aged 87. LeRoy was raised in the Macalester-Groveland and Frogtown neighborhoods of St. Paul. The home he lived in the longest, from about 1940 to about 1955, still stands at 569 Van Buren Avenue.

== Career ==
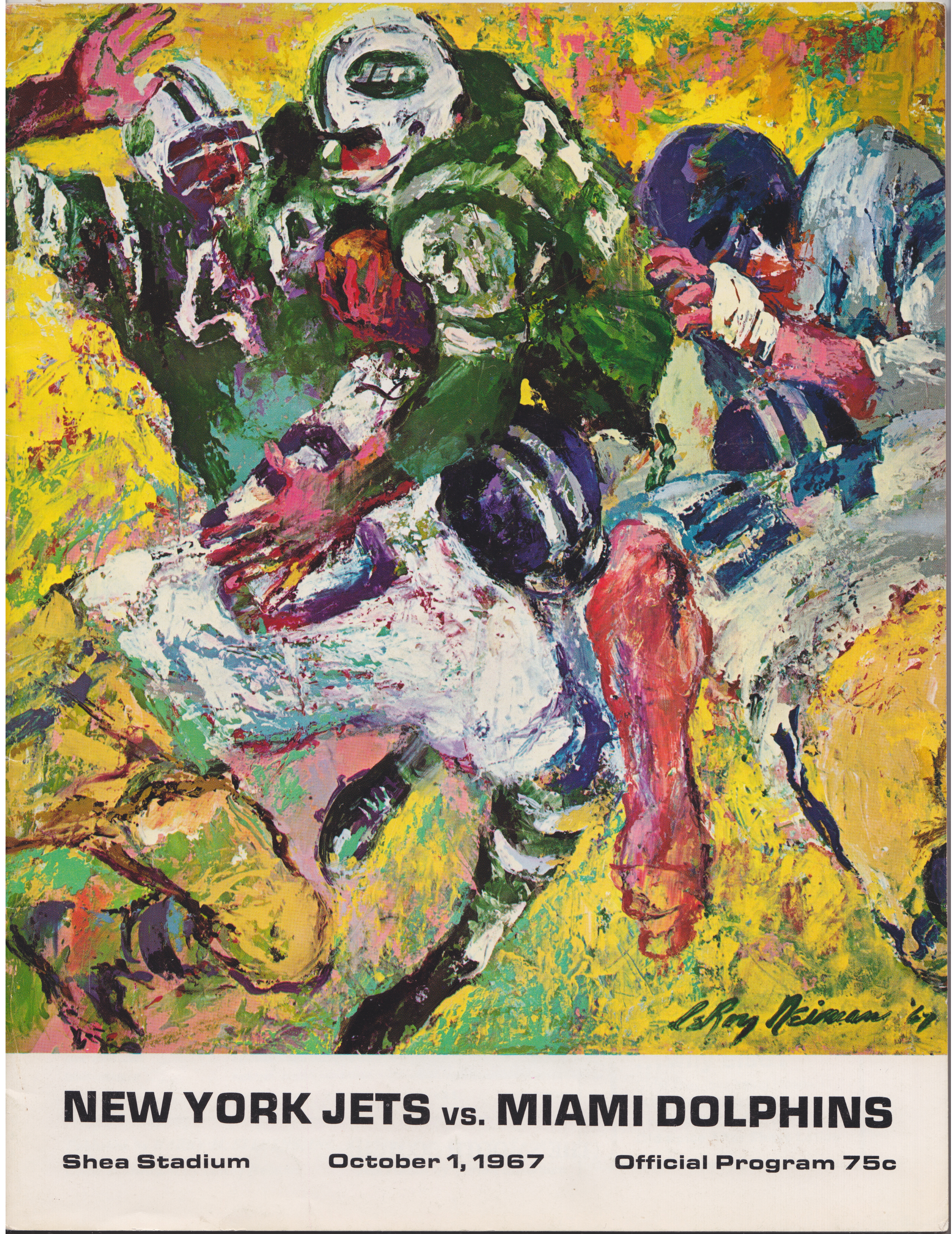
Program for 1967 Jets–Dolphins game

Neiman served in the U.S. Army during World War II. He worked as a cook until the end of the war, when his art skills were recognized and put to use painting sets for Red Cross shows. Following his return in 1946, Neiman studied briefly at the St. Paul School of Art, then at the School of The Art Institute of Chicago on the G.I. Bill. After graduating, Neiman served on the Art Institute faculty for ten years. During the time Neiman was teaching, he was exhibiting art in competitions and winning prizes.

Neiman met Hugh Hefner while doing freelance fashion illustration for the Carson Pirie Scott department store chain, where Hefner was a writer. In 1954, Neiman began his association with Playboy magazine. Hefner and Playboy art director Art Paul commissioned an illustration for the magazine's fifth edition. Hefner told Sports Illustrated, "I don't remember the moment. Our eyes did not meet across a crowded room." One day, after Hefner had started his magazine, he ran into Neiman on the street and asked him to become a contributor to Playboy. Among Neiman's contributions over the next 50 years, he created the Femlin character for the Party Jokes page, and did a feature for 15 years titled "Man at His Leisure", where Neiman would paint illustrations of his travels to exotic locations.

Beginning in 1960, he traveled the world observing and painting leisure life, social activities, and athletic competitions including the Olympics, the Super Bowl, the World Series, the Kentucky Derby, championship boxing, PGA and The Masters golf tournament, The Ryder Cup, the World Equestrian Games, Wimbledon and other Grand Slam competitions, as well as night life, entertainment, jazz, and the world of casino gambling.

In 1970, Neiman did the illustration for the 5th Dimension's album Portrait.

In 1994, Neiman was commissioned to create the illustrated logo for the Sherman Brothers musical Busker Alley. The illustration was used for posters and also was recreated as a five story high mural on the St. James Theater on Broadway (New York). In 1998, he did all the illustrations for a special "Sports" issue of The Nation magazine, for which he received the magazine's standard fee of $150.

Nieman was also an actor, known for minor parts as ring announcer in Rocky III (1982), Rocky IV (1985), and Rocky Balboa (2006).

Neiman sponsored and supported several organizations from coast to coast that foster art activities for underprivileged children such as The LeRoy Neiman Center for Youth in San Francisco and the Arts Horizons LeRoy Neiman Art Center in Harlem. He also has established facilities at various colleges, including the LeRoy Neiman Center for Print Studies at Columbia University in New York and the LeRoy Neiman Campus Center at his alma mater, the School of the Art Institute of Chicago. Neiman donated $5 million to the School of the Art Institute, which funded the construction of the Neiman Center at the School.

Neiman was the official painter of 5 Olympic games: 1972 Summer Olympics, 1976 Summer Olympics, 1980 Winter Olympics, 1984 Winter Olympics and 1984 Summer Olympics.

He received five honorary doctorates and numerous awards, a lifetime achievement award from the University of Southern California, an induction into the International Boxing Hall of Fame, and proclamations and citations. He received The Order of Lincoln award (the State's highest honor) on the 200th birthday celebration of Abraham Lincoln given by the Governor of Illinois in 2009. He authored 12 books of his art. A documentary on his jazz painting, The Big Band, had its world premiere in Los Angeles in February 2009.

Neiman produced about six different serigraph subjects a year, generally priced from $3,000 to $6,000 each. Gross annual sales of new serigraphs alone topped $10 million. Originals can sell for up to $500,000 for works such as Stretch Stampede, a mammoth 1975 oil painting of the Kentucky Derby. In addition to being a renowned sports artist, Neiman has created many works from his experience on safari, including Portrait of a Black Panther, Portrait of the Elephant, Resting Lion, and Resting Tiger. Some of his other subjects include sailing, cuisine, golf, boxing, horses, celebrities, famous locations, and America at play. Much of his work was done for Playboy magazine, for which he illustrated monthly until his death.

Neiman worked in oil, enamel, watercolor, pencil drawings, pastels, serigraphy and some lithographs and etching. Neiman was listed in Art Collector's Almanac, Who's Who in the East, Who's Who in American Art, Who's Who in America, and Who's Who in the World. He was a member of the Chicago Society of Artists. His works have been displayed in museums, sold at auctions, and displayed in galleries and online distributors. He is considered by many to be the first major sports artist in the world, challenged only in his later years by a new generation of artists like Stephen Holland and Richard T. Slone. His work is in the permanent collection of the Smithsonian, the Whitney Museum, the Brooklyn Museum, the National Baseball Hall of Fame and Museum, the Museum of Fine Arts in Boston, the State Hermitage Museum in Russia, Wadham College at Oxford, and in museums and art galleries the world over, as well as in private and corporate collections.

== Personal life ==
Neiman married Janet Byrne in 1957. They lived in New York City, their home base for over five decades, until Neiman's death. Their residence, inside a New York City landmark, the Hotel des Artistes over the Café des Artistes on West 67th Street, originally intended for painters, is made up of double-height rooms that overlook Central Park. Norman Rockwell once lived there, as well as celebrities Rudolph Valentino, Noël Coward, CNN founder Reese Schonfeld and former mayor John Lindsay. Neiman's painting studio, offices, and home are on one floor, his archives on another, and his penthouse at the top.

== Later years ==
Neiman continued to paint after having his right leg amputated, the result of arterial insufficiency, at a New York hospital in April 2010. Neiman's autobiography, titled All Told: My Art and Life Among Athletes, Playboys, Bunnies, and Provocateurs was published on June 5, 2012.

== Awards ==
LeRoy Neiman was inducted as a Laureate of The Lincoln Academy of Illinois and awarded the Order of Lincoln (the State's highest honor) by the Governor of Illinois in 2009 as a Bicentennial Laureate.

== Art market ==
As of August 8, 2013, the highest price attained for one of his works (Vegas, 1961) had been $173,000 ($242611 in 2025) in 2012. On March 23, 2016, his work entitled Auction at Sotheby's was sold at Christie's for $161,000 ($215984 in 2025). On November, 15, 2024, his work To the Wire was auctioned for $334,875 and his "Sax Man sold for $146,875. Both were described as "oil on board. Although it was only expected to sell in the $40–$60,000 range, Football Star Constellation set a new record price for a Neiman original at $430,000 in 2015 ($584059 in 2025).

== Death ==
Neiman died on June 20, 2012, twelve days after his 91st birthday, in New York City. He is buried in Woodlawn Cemetery in The Bronx, New York City.

== Books ==
- Neiman, LeRoy (1974). Art and Life Style. New York: Felicie. ISBN 0-9600692-3-2. OCLC 472736418.
- Neiman, LeRoy (1983). My Thirty Years In Sports. Abrams. p. 350. ISBN 0810913682.
- Neiman, LeRoy (2012). All Told: My Art and Life Among Athletes, Playboys, Bunnies, and Provocateurs. Guilford, CT: Lyons Press. ISBN 978-0-762778379. OCLC 756578679.
- Neiman, LeRoy (2025) Portrait of the Artist ISBN 9798308538028
