= Femlin =

Cartoon character in Playboy magazine

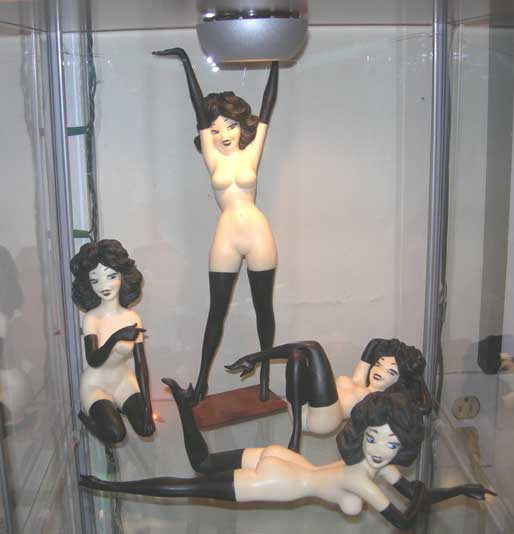
- Femlin statuettes from 1963
- First appearance: 1955
- Last appearance: Present
- Created by: LeRoy Neiman

In-universe information
- Species: Sprite
- Gender: Female
- Occupation: Comic mascot
- Affiliation: Playboy magazine
- Home: Playboy Party Jokes page
- Nationality: American
- Height: Approx. 10 to 12 in (250 to 300 mm)
- Clothing: Opera gloves, stockings, high heels
- Medium: Magazine illustration
- Years active: 1955–present

The Femlin is a character used on the Party Jokes page of Playboy magazine. Created in 1955 by LeRoy Neiman, Femlins became a mainstay of the magazine for more than five decades.

Some Femlin figurines produced in the 1960s have become much sought after by collectors.

== History ==
Femlins were created by sports illustrator LeRoy Neiman in 1955 when publisher/editor Hugh Hefner decided the Party Jokes page needed a visual element. The name is a portmanteau of "female" and "gremlin." They are portrayed as mischievous black-and-white female sprites, apparently 10 to 12 in (250 to 300 mm) tall, wearing only opera gloves, stockings, and high-heeled shoes. They are usually drawn in two- or three-panel vignettes, interacting with various life-sized items such as shoes, jewelry, neckties, and such.

Femlins have appeared on the Party Jokes page in every issue since their creation, and were featured on the magazine's cover numerous times, either as drawn by Neiman or in photographed tableaus of sculpted clay models. Neiman reportedly submitted two drawings of Femlin to Playboy every month for more than 50 years, working on the character late into his life, before his death at the age of 91 in 2012.

== Merchandising ==
Femlins have been featured on a variety of merchandise over the years, including ashtrays, shot glasses, and coffee mugs. In 1963, a set of four plaster statuettes was advertised for sale in the back pages of Playboy magazine. Each figure was approximately 14 inches tall and, like the original illustrations, was stylized but not anatomically detailed. Originally priced at US$7.50 apiece, similar sets have since become collectible. In 2024, a set of ceramic Femlin figures sold at auction for US$5,000.

In 2004, Playboy produced a new, updated figurine of a Femlin sitting in a champagne glass. Though out of production, they are still very common and should not be confused with the older figurines.
