= Stephen Holland (artist) =

American artist

- Stephen Holland
- Born: 1941 (age 84–85); New York City
- Education: Pratt Institute
- Known for: Painting, sports and celebrities
- Movement: Sports art, pop art

Stephen Holland (born 1941) is an American artist known for his portraits of athletes and celebrities such as Muhammad Ali, Joe Namath, Joe DiMaggio, Tiger Woods and David Beckham. His work is held in the permanent collection of the American Sports Art Museum and Archives and the Staples Center collection.

== Career ==
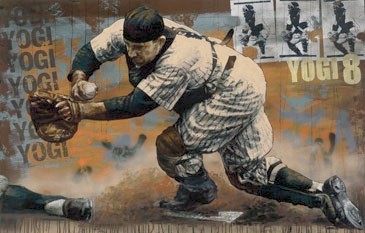
Yogi, an example of Holland's work

As a young painter, Holland did not have the finances to hire live models. The images he found in boxing magazines became his subjects. Holland attended the School of Industrial Art (now called the High School of Art and Design), which devoted half of each day to art studies. Later, he attended Pratt Institute, the Art Students League and the School of Visual Arts, all in New York City.

The American Sport Art Museum and Archives (ASAMA) in Daphne, AL, recognized Holland's abilities and contributions to both art and sport, bestowing upon him the title of Sports Artist of the Year 1993.

In addition to being the official artist of the Los Angeles Kings, Holland is one of the twelve artists selected by the United States Olympic Committee to represent the 100th Anniversary of the Olympics. He completed twenty-two paintings for the Baltimore Ravens' Walk of Fame, commemorating their paths to victory in 2001, and again for Super Bowl XXXV in 2013. In 2008, his art commemorated the year-long celebration of the Los Angeles Dodgers' 50 years in Los Angeles.

In 2009, he was commissioned to create ten paintings for the Colorado Avalanche hockey team to honor retiring players.

Holland continued to paint iconic portraits of musical entertainment's greats: Elton John, B. B. King, Jim Morrison, Bob Dylan, Elvis, Johnny Cash, John Lennon, Aretha Franklin, and The Rolling Stones, and musicians for The GRAMMY Charities Art Collection.

=== Exhibitions ===
Holland had numerous showings from 1991 to 2013. Notably, in 2012, Holland exhibited a series of paintings at Wisby-Smith Fine Art in Dallas, Texas. In 2013 Holland exhibited a portrait of Peyton Manning at Fascination Street Fine Art in Denver, Colorado.

Five paintings by Stephen Holland were accepted into the Smithsonian Institute's online Catalog of American Portraits. A notable example is the portrait of Barack Obama. Other portraits in the Catalog include Muhammad Ali, Sandy Koufax, Luc Robitaille and Andy Warhol.

After retiring from commercial portraiture in 2018, he began painting for his own gratification. In this series, which he calls "The Longneck Circus, Holland takes a radical departure from realism to explore his innermost visions, and encounters with people, places, and things in a fantastical world of characters. This new work is a continuation of his personal work, which he has painted and drawn since his early 20's and over the course of his career as a fine and commercial artist. In 2022, Holland, now an octogenarian, had his first showing of this new work at Silo118 Gallery in Santa Barbara, California, entitled "Longneck Circus".
