= Pro Beach Hockey =

Professional inline hockey league

Pro Beach Hockey (PBH) was a professional inline hockey league. The league was created by David McLane, who had previously created the World Roller Hockey League. It lasted three seasons, 1998, 1999 and 2000.

PBH games were played with a ball instead of a puck on an outdoor rink on the beach at Huntington Beach, California. The season lasted slightly less than two months in the early summer. Games were taped during the short season and aired on ESPN2 from June to September. The league is infamous for having ramps behind the nets to "increase speed," angled glass sections attached to the top of the dasher board glass to redirect the ball back into play and a 2-point line that was treated much like basketball's 3 point line.

The first taped events were shot in May 1998 and televised later on ESPN in an attempt to reach the younger audience. Cheerleaders and bands performed turning the tapings into an event. The team uniform designs were memorable for their bright, colorful designs that some observers have laughed at. Hockey fans appreciated that PBH kept the sport alive on television during summer months.

PBH players were mostly Roller Hockey International (RHI) players, several of which had previous National Hockey League (NHL) experience. The players were paid from a bonus pool depending on how each team finished each season.

Web Warriors won the first PBH championship, named The James J. Allegro Cup, over Dawg Pac, two games to none. Xpress won the second PBH championship in 1999 over Heavy Metal, two games to one. Web Warriors won the final PBH championship in 2000.

Ultimately, ESPN was unhappy with the TV ratings the league was receiving and decided to stop financially sponsoring the league.

== Teams ==
- Salsa
- Dawg Pac
- Heavy Metal
- Gargoyles
- Web Warriors
- Xpress

== Documentary film ==
A documentary about the league is being directed by Jake Cimperman, and produced by Jeanie Buss and NHL players Max McCormick and Chris Driedger.

It is scheduled for release in Summer 2026.
