= Neppis =

Outdoor sport played with small toy cars

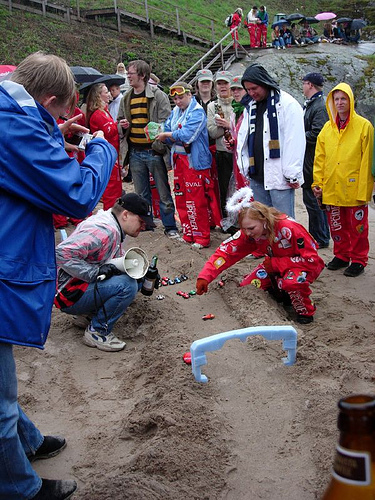
Neppis Grand Prix in Suomenlinna.

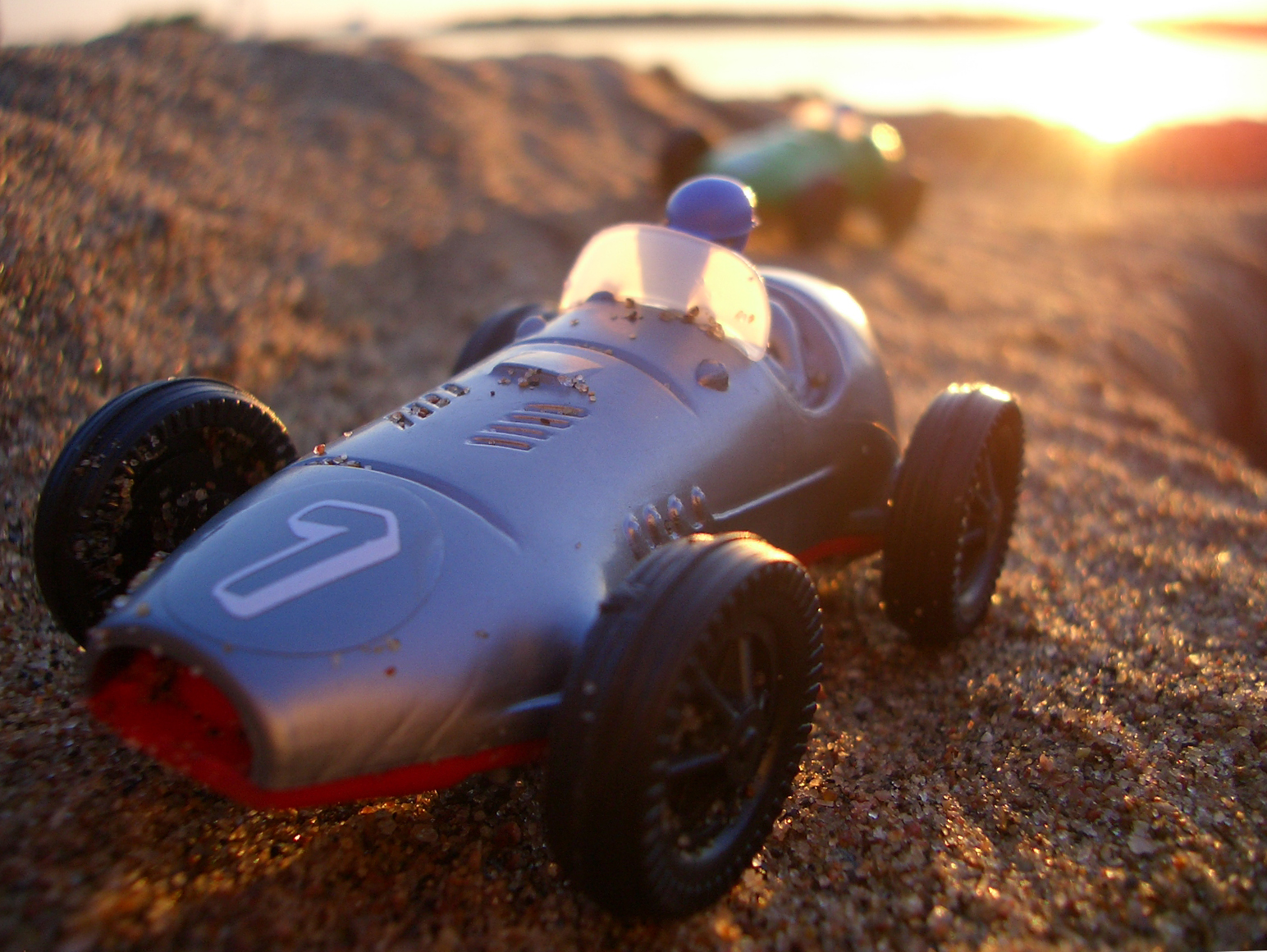
A neppis car

Neppis is a competitive outdoor sport played in Finland, simulating race driving. It is played with small toy cars on sand.

The "official" neppis car is made of plastic and resembles a 1950s racing car, with metal axles and sturdy black plastic wheels. The "golden era" of neppis, in the sandpits of Finnish residential areas, was the late 1970s, but the sport has gained popularity since the early 2000s. The sport was especially popular among boys.

Retro-spirited adults have warmed up the sport again. It is advertised as the cleanest motor sport. For example, the counterevent to Rally Finland (Jyväskylän Suurajot), called "Small Rally Finland" (Jyväskylän Pienajot) was based on neppis. Originally intended as a game for children, the sport has been fit into an adult taste: the size of the cars has increased and they can be self-made, bringing rise to the challenging side of the sport, for example MRC neppis. Neppis cars can also be tuned by cutting away parts of the chassis or adding weight to the bottom, however in some instances, the local rules forbid tuning.

== Rules ==
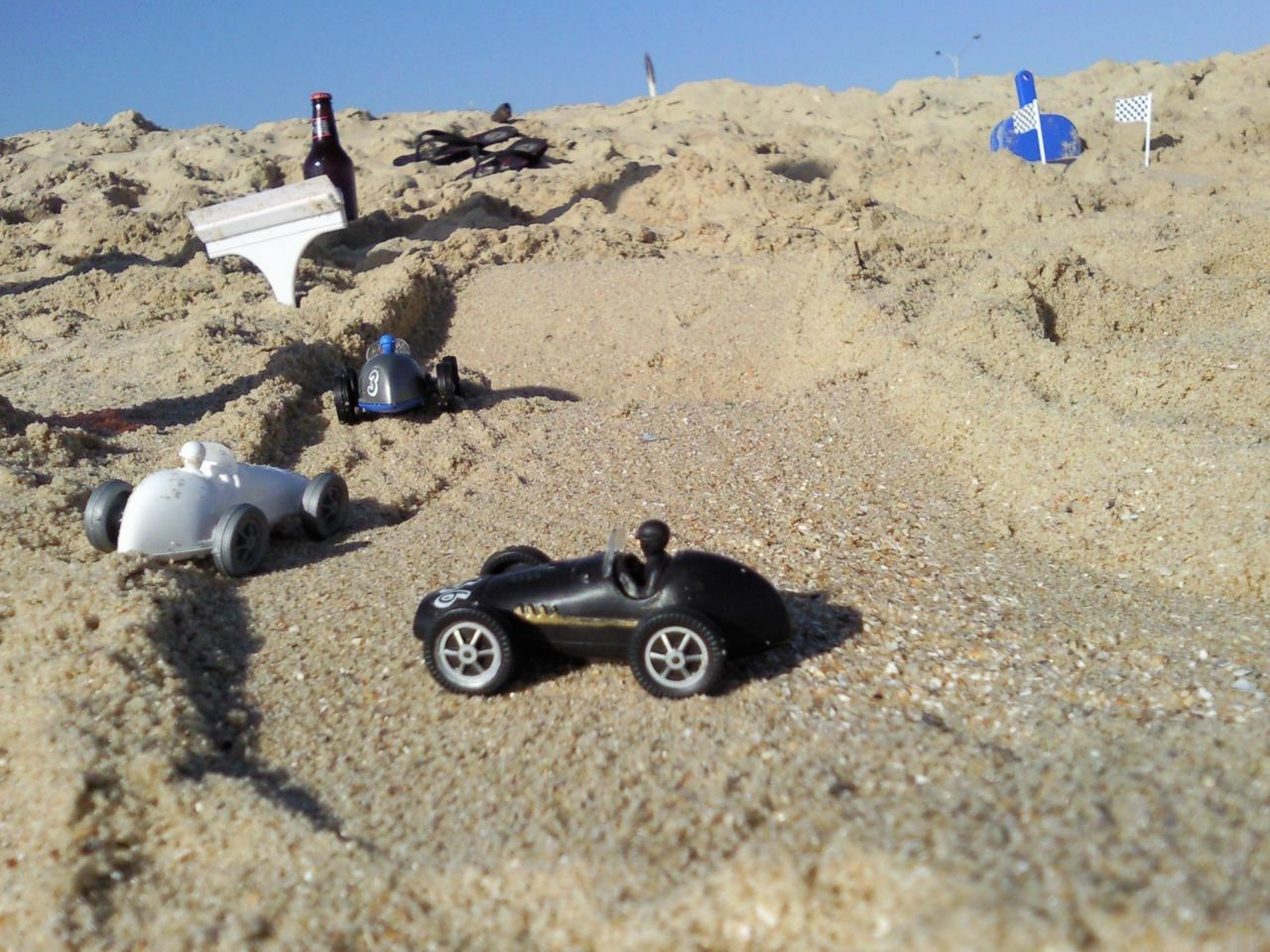
A neppis track made of sand and plastic neppis cars.

Neppis is played on a race track made of sand, which is typically made by smoothing out the sand with the sole. This makes the width of the track approximately equal to the length of an adult foot. The track can include spring-outs and pits. The track can be made of any material whatsoever, but it is most commonly made of slightly wet, fine-grained sand. The rules of the actual race can vary depending on the organiser.

On his/her turn, each competitor "neps" his/her car by tapping it with the side of a bent index finger. Most commonly, there are three "neps" per turn. Prior to the "nepping", the car can be placed at any horizontal point along the width of the track but may not be moved along the length of the track. The nose of the car can also be turned at any point during the race. The person to circle the entire track the fastest wins. If the car runs off the track or is turned upside down (goes into a so-called kelli), or turns a full circle by passing through an upside-down position (a so-called half-kelli), the car has to be replaced where the turn started, or into a special kelli place. It is forbidden to modify the track during the race.

There are also more challenging rules for the sport.

== Hobby ==
Neppis was practised as a hobby already in the 1960s inspired by the Eläintarhan ajot races in Helsinki. The sport was its most popular in the 1970s and 1980s, but its popularity waned in the 1990s. The hobby was mostly practised by workplace teams and teekkari students. The popularity of the sport has regrown since the 2000s. At first the sport was popular among children, but has since gained popularity also among adults.

The official racing car for neppis is Formula-Neppis, made by the Finnish company Hot-Toys. Egma Oy launched a plastic toy race car in the 1960s, resembling a race car from the 1950s. A player can modify their neppis car by cutting away parts of the car or by adding weight to its bottom. Some local racing rules forbid this kind of modification. Neppis has also been played with metal toy race cars.

== Racing ==
Finnish neppis leagues include Superneppis, Spedeneppis, and Neppisweekly. There are hundreds of neppis players in Finland and the sport has also been exported abroad. Simo Pihkala has acted as the judge of the Helsinki Neppis Champion race between the three main leagues since 2012.

The Kannunvalajat student organisation of the faculty of government sciences at the University of Helsinki holds an annual Valtsikan Neppis Grand Prix race in Suomenlinna every year in late May. The race has been held every year since 1996 (except for the COVID-19 lockdown). Arto Aniluoto served as the main organiser and judge for a long time.

== In culture ==
The Oulu software company Frozen Vision published a neppis mobile game Nepcar Racing in 2014. Development of the game started in summer 2013 and was financed by Microsoft among other companies.
