= Beach golf =

Golf-based beach sport

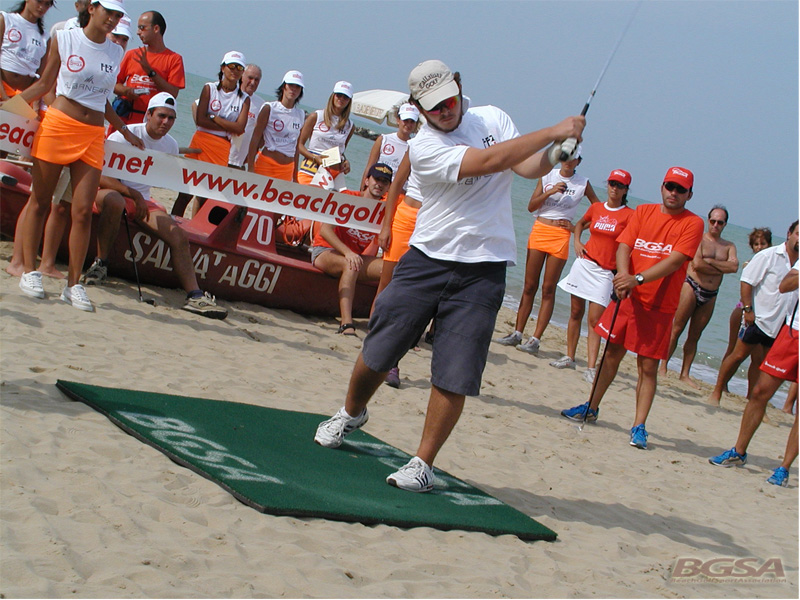
Beach Golf event 2002

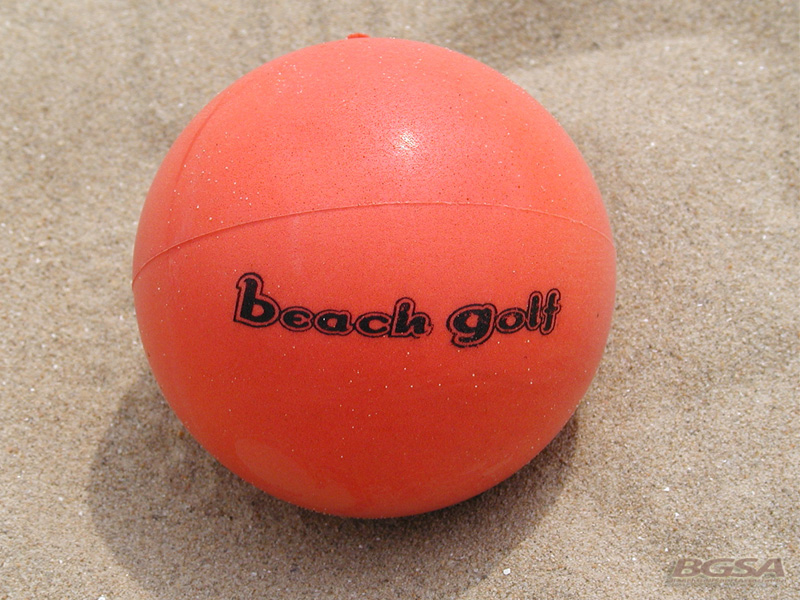
Special Beach Golf Ball

Beach golf is a variation of golf mainly played on sandy beaches. It was devised with the aim of a simplified and more accessible version of golf.

The game is played along a distance of about 2 kilometres (1.2 miles) on which the players, two per team, with as few strokes as possible, have to reach the final hole, hitting a soft polyurethane ball with a classic golf club.

== History ==
Beach golf was created in Pescara, Italy in 1999 by Mauro De Marco. It was designed to be played on crowded beaches during the summer. Objects on the beach are incorporated into the game. Beach umbrellas, bathing people and other objects are turned into obstacles of the game. The rules allow the audience to interact with participants.

The game, developed by BGSA (Beach Golf Sport Association), has been recognized by the Centro Sportivo Educativo Nazionale (National Educational Sports Centre) and by the Italian National Olympic Committee.

In the summer of 2014, in Montesilvano, was organized the first edition of the European Beach Golf Contest, an international event which was attended by 90 athletes representing 18 European nations. The 7 days of competition have seen the triumph of the Irish Robert Cast, who took home the first continental title.

Notable competitions have included the Jeckerson Cup 2005 held in the Piazza del Campo, Siena. The competition was held between 40 teams from different nations. Teams competed in the streets in a "We Golf" race (variant of Beach golf on the street) and were followed by a crowd of 80000 people.

In the following years tours were conducted during the summer on the beaches of the Italian coast.

- 2006 Italian championship departed from Naples, and also visited the regions of Calabria. and Sardinia.
- The tour of 2010, in collaboration with the University of Urbino, was thirty consecutive days of events along the coast of the Adriatic Sea.

Beach golf has been discussed on an Italian national television network and on Radio Kiss Kiss. Space was also given to Beach golf in the Rimini Wellness Fair, and Sports Day.

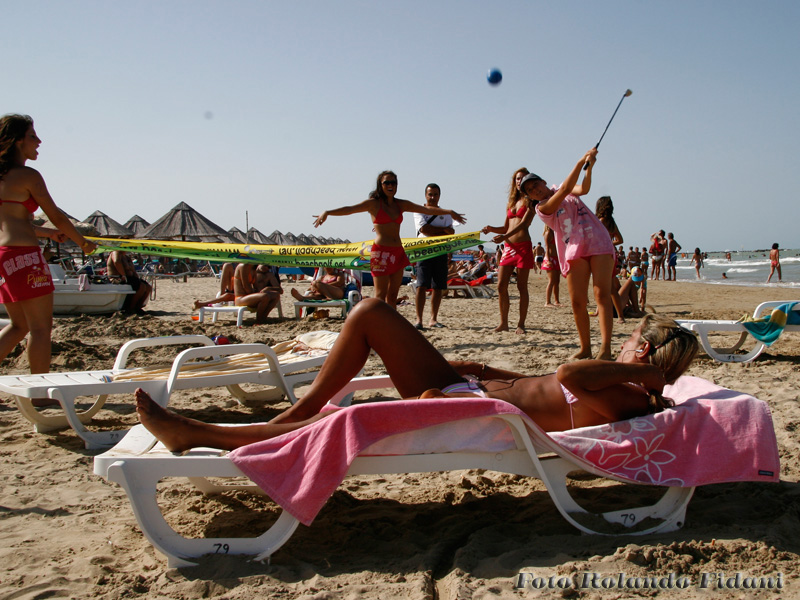
natural obstacles in Beach golf event 2007

== Rules ==
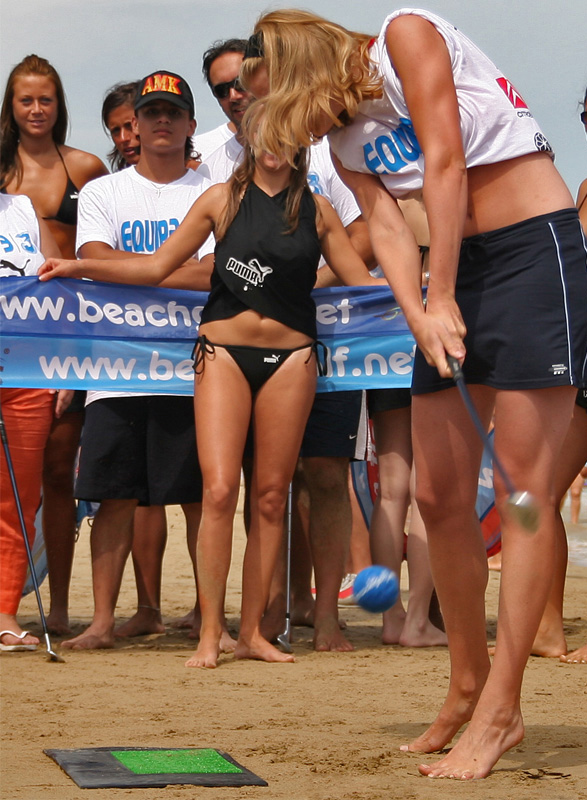
Swing on the beach, event 2006

Regulations have been created for the Beach Golf Event, aiming to anticipate various kinds of situations. The main rule states that people and things constitute natural obstacles on the path.

The game takes place along a path of 2 km of sandy coastline on the beach, where 40 teams of two players each (a pro and a beginner), challenge each other to arrive at the final hole with the fewest possible strokes. The game-track is not bounded by any type of border and is punctuated by beach umbrellas and bathers that become natural obstacles throughout the competition.

Because of the crowded place where the event takes place, the ball used is made of soft polyurethane foam to prevent injury to anyone who is accidentally hit during the game. The route is accompanied throughout its track by music and entertainment that involve, in an original way, the audience that becomes active in the field of play. The range of the golfer beach is bordered by a protection zone of about 5 meters, supported by three girls on the way to accompany throughout the game.

=== Team ===
Each team is composed of two players, a low-handicap player and a high-handicap one. The sum of the two handicaps split approximately to the next lower (e.g.: mean 17.5, the team is hcp 17) and that is the team's handicap that show how many improvements can benefit the team. The game is played with only one beaten ball each turn. It is admitted that the one it replaces the other, in case you lose stroke and distance. Penalty: loss of stroke and distance.

=== Scorecard ===
The scorecard is a table which shows the data about the team and the history of the game. It consists of nine items:

Label	Description
Team	Name of the team as well as the sponsor.
Player 1	Name, surname and handicap of the player with the lowest handicap in the team.
Player 2	Name, surname and handicap of the player with the highest handicap in the team.
Team Handicap	Average handicap of the team.
Score	All strokes played during the round.
Drop	All drops that took place during the round.
Penalty	All penalties that was incurred during the round.
Handicap	Strokes that can be deducted from the score.
Scorer	The name of the caddie girl that recorded the score.

=== Game ===
It is a stroke-game competition held in two rounds. Two types of balls are used: a soft rubber, totally harmless ( 69 mm in diameter ) which is used along the track and a regular one on the green. There is no time limit. Players have the opportunity to stop to have a lunch break, however, teams must respect the assigned starting time.

=== Track ===
This goes along the shore of any beach. When the Beach Golf is held in Pescara, we start from Paolucci Square and arrive at Stadium of the Sea, close to Cascella's Ship. The track has a length of 1600 meters and a width that take the whole beach.

=== The starting area ===
The starting area is located where the first ball is hit. The area consists of a synthetic rug 1.50x1.50 m2. The ball is placed on the appropriate tee and both players choose a tee shot, placing the balls in the best possible way. The honor is given (noblesse oblige) to the lower handicap player. Any missed shot or barely touched balls are considered as a shot along the path. If the ball is dropped from the tee without being touched can be repositioned to make the shot. Each team starts three minutes after the previous one. The delay allowed is ten minutes after the departure of the next team. The laggard team start for last with a penalty of five shots.

=== Equipment ===
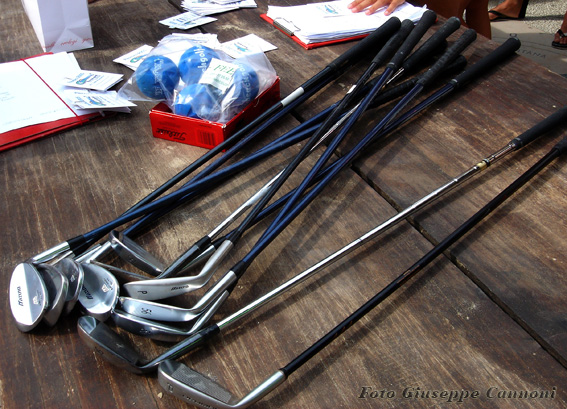
Beach Golf Clubs

The equipment used consist in a classic golf club, expanded foam balls and a protection belt.

==== Clubs ====
Preferably sand or wedge type.

==== Ball ====
The ball is made of polyurethane foam with a diameter of 7 cm and a weight of 35g approximately. Its composition makes them harmless, allowing to play anywhere.

==== Protection belt ====
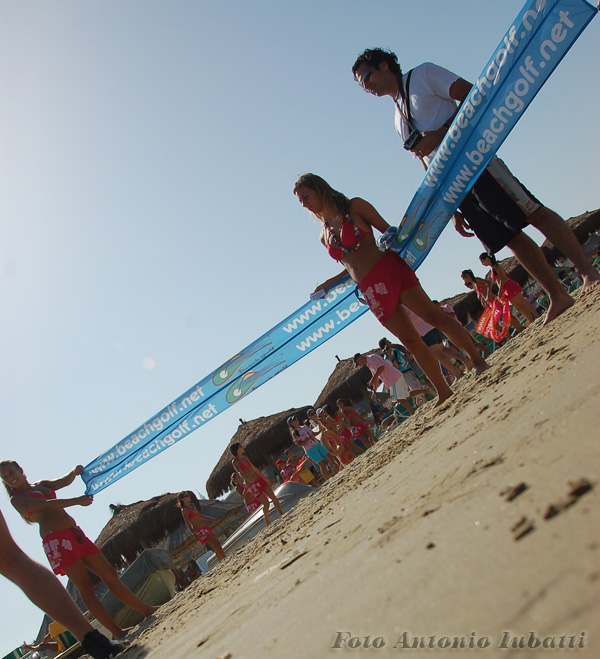
Protection Belt

This is held by the Caddy Girls and has a very important function which is to guarantee the safety of bathers, the players and anyone who is on the game-track. This is what makes the Beach Golf the only sport in the world where viewers are on the pitch and involved as active part in the game.

== Caddy Girls ==
Caddy Girls act both as game-judges and hostesses during the event. Their role is to ensure that the game takes place in a proper and safe way. The Caddy Girls support a protection belt around the area of action, aiming to allow the golfer to play in peace among the bathers, beach chairs and umbrellas.

The BGSA has planned a special calendar, featuring the Beach golf Caddy Girls.
