= World Roller Hockey League =

World Roller Hockey League (WRHL) was a professional inline hockey league. It lasted only one season.

The WRHL was the creation of promoter David McLane. WRHL games were played with a puck on an outdoor rink with a SportCourt surface at Disney-MGM Studios in Orlando, Florida . 1993 was a pivotal year in the sport of Roller in-line hockey as inline skates were just coming into use in the sport. Previous roller hockey had been played using quad roller skates. In line skates were faster, changing the speed of the game. WRHL was one of the first events to give public exposure to the new development in an organized form.

Former NHLers such as Ron Duguay and Pierre Larouche played in the league. The season lasted slightly less than two months in the early summer of 1993 as a made for television event. Games were taped during the short season and aired on ESPN. They were later aired in Canada on TSN.

The intent was to capture the viewers enthusiasm for the sport of roller hockey, which at the time had 10 million participants and 28,000 amateur leagues. The games were faster because, as Jerry Greene the Orlando Sentinel observed "These guys can't stop."

Former NHL All Star Robert Picard, who played for the Titans observed "It really is a good game. It's a little slower than ice hockey, but the flow is better because you can't stand still."

Memorabilia from WRHL is housed in the Roller Hockey Hall of Fame. Following its initial season, McLance merged WRHL with Roller Hockey International.

== Teams ==
- Aztecs
- Blast
- Express
- Fury
- Titans
- Turbos
- Typhoon
- Wave
- Mascots

The Express captured the only WRHL title in a best-of-three final.
