= List of Necrophagia band members =

Necrophagia was an American death metal band from Wellsville, Ohio. Formed in 1985, the group originally consisted of vocalist Frank "Killjoy" Pucci, guitarist Larry "Madthrash" Madison and drummer Jason "Dagon" Moloch. After Moloch was replaced by Joe "Voyeur" Blazer and Bill "Bork" James joined on bass, the band released its debut album Season of the Dead in 1987, before breaking up in 1988. Pucci later reformed the group in 1997, fronting the band until his death in March 2018. The final lineup of Necrophagia also included drummer Shawn Slusarek, guitarist Serge Streltsov and bassist Jake Arnette.

== History ==
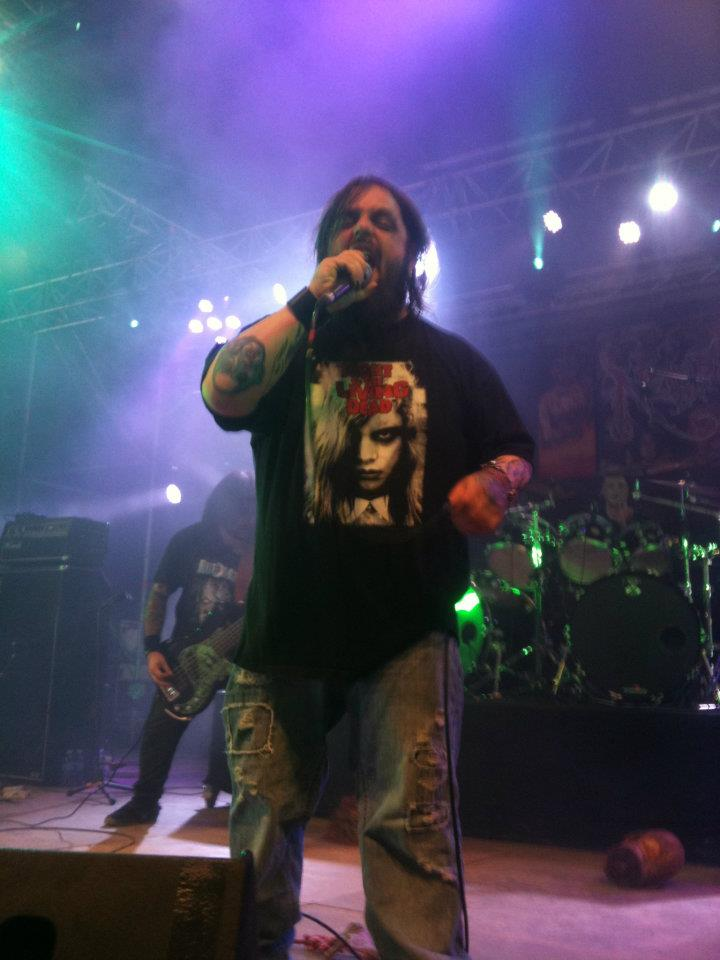
Frank "Killjoy" Pucci was Necrophagia's frontman and vocalist for its entire tenure.

=== 1984–1988 ===
Necrophagia was officially formed in May 1985 with a lineup of Frank "Killjoy" Pucci on vocals, Larry "Madthrash" Madison on guitar and Jason "Dagon" Moloch on drums. Prior to this, Pucci and Moloch had recorded the demos Death Is Fun and Rise from the Crypt under the moniker in 1984, on which Madison was credited despite not performing. After a few months, Moloch was replaced by Joe "Voyeur" Blazer, and in January 1986 the band added Bill "Bork" James as its first bassist. A string of demos followed, before the band signed with New Renaissance Records and released its full-length debut Season of the Dead in February 1987 (July in the United States).

Killjoy fired the rest of the band in January 1988, claiming that the other members "just didn't want to do the sorta stuff [he] did, so we're going in different directions". He briefly worked with a new lineup on a second Necrophagia album called Compelled by Fear, retaining James on bass and replacing Madison with a guitarist known only as "Dave", but later confirmed the group's disbandment and formed his own solo band. Killjoy later released an album called Compelled by Fear in 1990.

=== 1997–2008 ===
In 1997, Killjoy reformed Necrophagia after encouragement from Pantera frontman Phil Anselmo — with whom he had been working as part of the group Viking Crown — who he claims "resurrected" the band by writing "some truly dark, horrific music". The new lineup included Anselmo (under his alias "Anton Crowley") on guitar, Dustin Havnen on bass and Wayne Fabra on drums, who together released the comeback album Holocausto de la Morte in 1998. After the video Through Eyes of the Dead and the EP Black Blood Vomitorium, Havnen was replaced during the summer of 2001 by Jared Faulk. By the fall, the band's lineup had expanded with the addition of second guitarist Fred "Frediablo" Prytz and keyboardist Opal Enthroned (Stephanie Weinstein), both of whom performed on the EP Cannibal Holocaust issued before the end of the year.

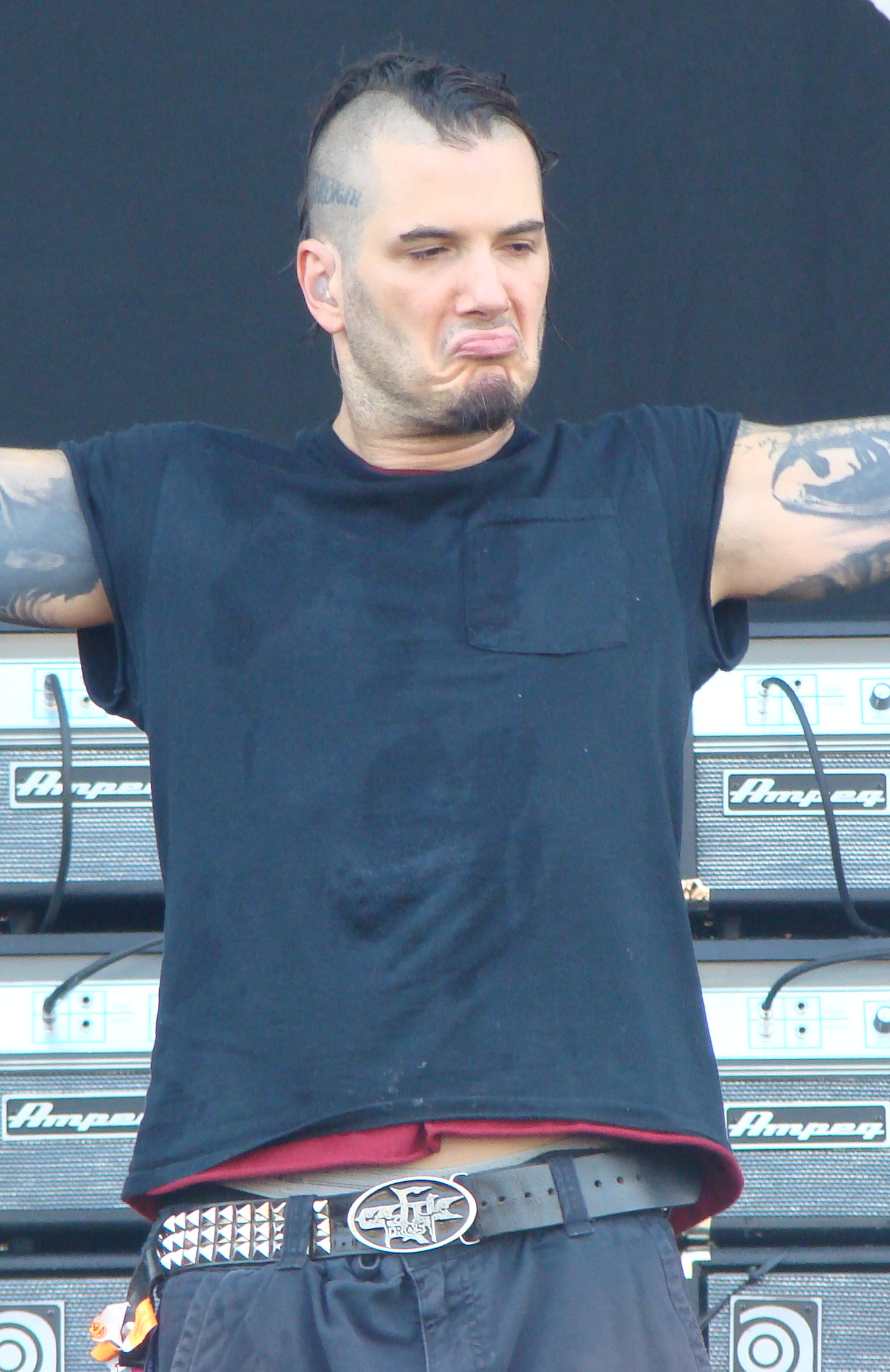
Pantera frontman Phil Anselmo played guitar for Necrophagia from 1997 to 2002.

In June 2002, Anselmo, Faulk and Weinstein were replaced by Knut "Fug" Prytz, Stian "Iscariah" Smørholm and Mirai Kawashima, respectively. A couple of months later, Fabra was also replaced by Giovanni "Titta" Tani. This lineup remained stable for several years, releasing fourth studio album The Divine Art of Torture in 2003, EP Goblins Be Thine and video Nightmare Scenarios in 2004, fifth studio album Harvest Ritual, Volume I and video Necrotorture/Sickcess in 2005, and finally live album Slit Wrists and Casket Rot in 2006. In September 2005, Prytz announced his departure from Necrophagist, as well as several other bands, claiming that he "desperately need[ed] to distance [himself] from a large portion of this scene in order to maintain any love at all for metal music". He was replaced almost a year later in July 2006 by Undead Torment.

=== 2008–2018 ===
Necrophagia's lineup continued to change over the next few years — Opal Enthroned returned in March 2008, Boris Randall replaced guitarist Fug in January 2010, and by July 2010, Iscariah and Titta Tani had been replaced by Damien Matthews and Shawn Slusarek, respectively, while Opal Enthroned had left again. This lineup released the band's first studio album in six years, Deathtrip 69, in May 2011. Just over a year later, the band confirmed a new lineup including guitarists Abigail Lee Nero and Scrimm, plus returning keyboardist Mirai Kawashima. "The Wicked" and WhiteWorm Cathedral followed in 2013 and 2014, respectively. Nero left during 2015.

The band toured with stand-in guitarist Steve Lehocky during 2015, later adding Kathryn Flesher on bass for shows in 2016. In January 2017, a new lineup featuring guitarist Serge Streltsov and bassist Jake Arnette was unveiled. On March 18, 2018, frontman Killjoy died, marking the end of Necrophagia. In 2024, the band's final album Moribundis Grim was released, featuring recordings from the 2017–2018 lineup completed in 2022 with the help of former members Titta Tani and Mirai Kawashima.

== Members ==
Image	Name	Years active	Instruments	Release contributions
	Frank "Killjoy" Pucci	1984–1988; 1997–2018; (his death)	vocals; guitar (on 1984 demos)	all Necrophagia releases
	Jason "Dagon" Moloch	1984–1985	drums	Death Is Fun (1984); Rise from the Crypt (1984)
	Larry "Madthrash" Madison	1985–1988	guitar	all releases from Autopsy on the Living Dead (1985) to Ready for Death (1990)
	Joe "Voyeur" Blazer	1985–1988	drums	all releases from Autopsy on the Living Dead (1985) to Ready for Death (1990)
	Bill "Bork" James	1986–1988	bass	all releases from Power Through Darkness (1986) to Ready for Death (1990)
	Wayne Fabra	1997–2002	drums	all releases from Holocausto de la Morte (1998) to "Kindred of the Dying Kind" (2003)
	Phil Anselmo ("Anton Crowley")	1997–2002	guitar	all releases from Holocausto de la Morte (1998) to "Kindred of the Dying Kind" (2003)
	Dustin Havnen	1997–2001	bass	all releases from Holocausto de la Morte (1998) to "Kindred of the Dying Kind" (2003), except Cannibal Holocaust (2001)
	Jared Faulk	2001–2002	bass	Cannibal Holocaust (2001)
	Fred "Frediablo" Prytz	2001–2005	guitar	all releases from Cannibal Holocaust (2001) to Slit Wrists and Casket Rot (2006), except "Kindred of the Dying Kind" (2003)
	Stephanie Weinstein ("Opal Enthroned")	2001–2002; 2008–2010	keyboards	Cannibal Holocaust (2001)
	Knut "Fug" Prytz	2002–2010	guitar	all releases from The Divine Art of Torture (2003) to Slit Wrists and Casket Rot (2006)
	Stian "Iscariah" Smørholm	2002–2010	bass	all releases from The Divine Art of Torture (2003) to Slit Wrists and Casket Rot (2006)
	Mirai Kawashima	2002–2008; 2012–2015	keyboards	all releases from The Divine Art of Torture (2003) to Slit Wrists and Casket Rot (2006); WhiteWorm Cathedral (2014); Moribundis Grim (2024)
	Giovanni "Titta" Tani	2002–2010	drums	all releases from The Divine Art of Torture (2003) to Slit Wrists and Casket Rot (2006); Moribundis Grim (2024)
	Andrew (surname unknown) ("Undead Torment")	2006–2012	guitar	Deathtrip 69 (2011)
	Boris Randall	2010–2012	guitar	Deathtrip 69 (2011)
	Shawn Slusarek	2010–2018	drums	Deathtrip 69 (2011); "The Wicked" (2013); WhiteWorm Cathedral (2014); Moribundis Grim (2024)
	Damien Matthews	2010–2015	bass	Deathtrip 69 (2011); "The Wicked" (2013); WhiteWorm Cathedral (2014)
	Scrimm (real name unknown)	2012–2015	guitar	"The Wicked" (2013); WhiteWorm Cathedral (2014)
	Abigail Lee Nero	2012–2015	guitar	"The Wicked" (2013); WhiteWorm Cathedral (2014)
	Steve Lehocky	2015–2016	guitar	none
	Kathryn Flesher	2015–2016	bass	none
	Serge Streltsov	2017–2018	guitar; bass	Moribundis Grim (2024)
	Jake Arnette	2017–2018	bass	Moribundis Grim (2024)

== Lineups ==
Period	Members	Releases
1984 (unofficial lineup)	Frank "Killjoy" Pucci — vocals, guitar; Jason "Dagon" Moloch — drums	Death Is Fun demo (1984); Rise from the Crypt demo (1984)
Summer 1985	Frank "Killjoy" Pucci — vocals; Larry "Madthrash" Madison — guitar; Jason "Dagon" Moloch — drums	none
Fall 1985–January 1986	Frank "Killjoy" Pucci — vocals; Larry "Madthrash" Madison — guitar; Joe "Voyeur" Blazer — drums	Autopsy on the Living Dead (1985); The Hallow's Evil Rehearsal (1985)
January 1986–January 1988	Frank "Killjoy" Pucci — vocals; Larry "Madthrash" Madison — guitar; Bill "Bork" James — bass; Joe "Voyeur" Blazer — drums	Power Through Darkness (1986); Nightmare Continues (1986); Death Is Fun (1994) — "Unreleased EP"; Season of the Dead (1987); Ready for Death (1990)
Band inactive 1988–1997
1997–summer 2001	Frank "Killjoy" Pucci — vocals; Anton Crowley — guitar; Dustin Havnen — bass; Wayne Fabra — drums	Holocausto de la Morte (1998); Through Eyes of the Dead (1998); Black Blood Vomitorium (2000); "Devil Eyes" (2001); "Kindred of the Dying Kind" (2003)
Summer–fall 2001	Frank "Killjoy" Pucci — vocals; Anton Crowley — guitar; Jared Faulk — bass; Wayne Fabra — drums	none
Fall 2001–June 2002	Frank "Killjoy" Pucci — vocals; Anton Crowley — guitar; Fred "Frediablo" Prytz — guitar; Jared Faulk — bass; Wayne Fabra — drums; Opal Enthroned — keyboards	Cannibal Holocaust (2001)
June–August 2002	Frank "Killjoy" Pucci — vocals; Fred "Frediablo" Prytz — guitar; Knut "Fug" Prytz — guitar; Stian "Iscariah" Smørholm — bass; Wayne Fabra — drums; Mirai Kawashima — keyboards	none
August 2002–September 2005	Frank "Killjoy" Pucci — vocals; Fred "Frediablo" Prytz — guitar; Knut "Fug" Prytz — guitar; Stian "Iscariah" Smørholm — bass; Giovanni "Titta" Tani — drums; Mirai Kawashima — keyboards	The Divine Art of Torture (2003); Goblins Be Thine (2004); Nightmare Scenarios (2004); Harvest Ritual, Volume I (2005); Necrotorture/Sickcess (2005); Slit Wrists and Casket Rot (2006)
September 2005–July 2006	Frank "Killjoy" Pucci — vocals; Knut "Fug" Prytz — guitar; Stian "Iscariah" Smørholm — bass; Giovanni "Titta" Tani — drums; Mirai Kawashima — keyboards	none
July 2006–March 2008	Frank "Killjoy" Pucci — vocals; Knut "Fug" Prytz — guitar; Undead Torment — guitar; Stian "Iscariah" Smørholm — bass; Giovanni "Titta" Tani — drums; Mirai Kawashima — keyboards	none
March 2008–January 2010	Frank "Killjoy" Pucci — vocals; Knut "Fug" Prytz — guitar; Undead Torment — guitar; Stian "Iscariah" Smørholm — bass; Giovanni "Titta" Tani — drums; Opal Enthroned — keyboards	none
January–summer 2010	Frank "Killjoy" Pucci — vocals; Undead Torment — guitar; Boris Randall — guitar; Stian "Iscariah" Smørholm — bass; Giovanni "Titta" Tani — drums; Opal Enthroned — keyboards	none
Summer 2010–June 2012	Frank "Killjoy" Pucci — vocals; Undead Torment — guitar; Boris Randall — guitar; Damien Matthews — bass; Shawn Slusarek — drums	Deathtrip 69 (2011)
June 2012–summer 2015	Frank "Killjoy" Pucci — vocals; Abigail Lee Nero — guitar; Scrimm — guitar; Damien Matthews — bass; Shawn Slusarek — drums; Mirai Kawashima — keyboards	"The Wicked" (2013); WhiteWorm Cathedral (2014)
2015	Frank "Killjoy" Pucci — vocals; Steve Lehocky — guitar; Damien Matthews — bass; Shawn Slusarek — drums; Mirai Kawashima — keyboards	none
2016	Frank "Killjoy" Pucci — vocals; Steve Lehocky — guitar; Kathryn Lesher — bass; Shawn Slusarek — drums	none
January 2017–March 2018	Frank "Killjoy" Pucci — vocals; Serge Streltsov — guitar; Jake Arnette — bass; Shawn Slusarek — drums	Moribundis Grim (2024)
