= Extreme cinema =

Film genre with excessive violence and sex

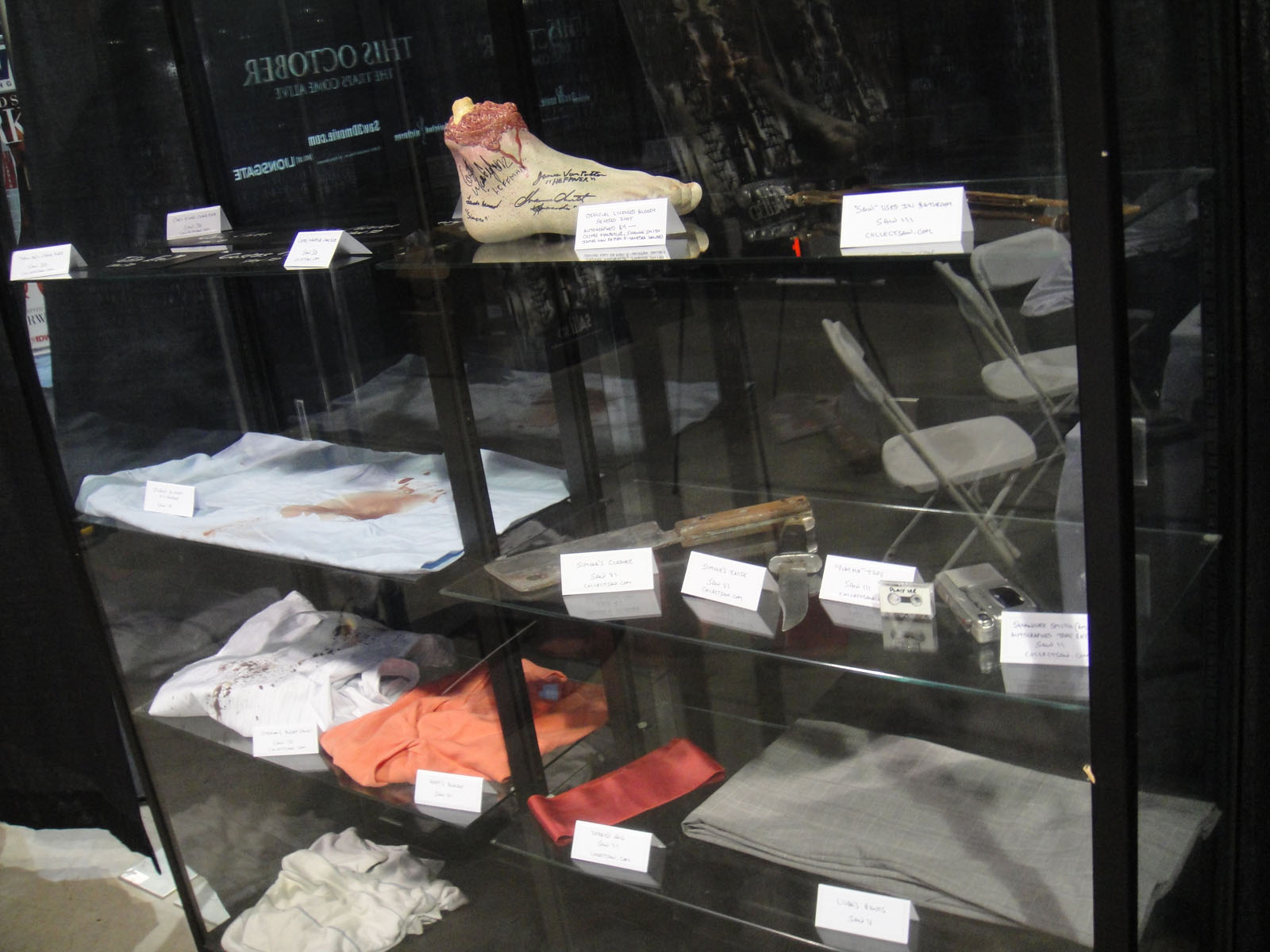
A set of props used in the production of the Saw films, which are notorious for depicting extreme graphic violence

Extreme cinema (or hardcore horror and extreme horror) is a film subgenre characterized by the deliberate use of graphic depictions of sex, violence, and other taboo or transgressive acts, including mutilation, torture, and sexual violence. While often rooted in horror cinema, extreme films can also overlap with exploitation, arthouse, and experimental traditions. Influences include mid-20th-century exploitation and splatter films, Japanese ero guro and pink film movements, and later transgressive works such as the New French Extremity.

The global rise of Asian horror and exploitation cinema in the late 20th and early 21st centuries—particularly films from Japan, South Korea, and Thailand—helped popularize the style internationally, alongside European and North American contributions. Extreme cinema remains a controversial category, frequently drawing criticism for perceived gratuitousness or moral irresponsibility, while some defend it as a legitimate form of artistic provocation or social commentary. Due to its explicit content, it is often excluded from mainstream distribution and appeals primarily to a niche market of underground cinema enthusiasts.

== History ==
=== Early influences ===
Paris's Théâtre du Grand-Guignol (1897–1962) formalized the "shock horror" aesthetic, specializing in plays depicting blood, dismemberment, and psychological terror. Its visceral on‑stage gore directly inspired filmmakers to pursue similarly explicit imagery on screen. The movie Un Chien Andalou (1929) was one of the first kinds of films that were labeled as extreme cinema.

=== Video nasties era ===
In 1980s Britain, the explosion of unregulated VHS horror tapes, which were later nicknamed "video nasties" by campaign groups, including The National Viewers' and Listeners' Association (NVALA), caused a major moral panic. Dozens of films faced prosecution under the Obscene Publications Act, leading to the Video Recordings Act 1984, which can find any film liable for potential harm to viewers. 39 titles were successfully prosecuted outright, highlighting how graphic violence had become a censorship battleground, though only a handful are considered extreme cinema nowadays. The Italian film Cannibal Holocaust (1980) blended documentary conventions with animal cruelty and dismemberment. Its found‑footage realism led to legal investigations into its director Ruggero Deodato and helped inaugurate the modern “found‑footage horror” subgenre, including movies such as The Blair Witch Project (1999). Its graphic, realistic content led to it getting banned in various countries, including Australia, though it would be unbanned in 2005.

=== Mondo films ===
Some Mondo films, like the Traces of Death series (starting in 1993), compiled real-life footage of deaths and accidents with little to no context or educational value, leading to the first Traces of Death to be banned in the UK in 2005, due to the belief that the film was violating the Video Recordings Act 1984 and the Obscene Publications Act 1959. While others, such as the first Faces of Death (1978), were issued an 18 certificate with cuts due to scenes of animal cruelty, after being seized for obscenity for 20 years. A 1997 incident involving a Pennsylvania woman who lodged formal complaints after renting Traces of Death drew public attention to its release.

=== Asian Extreme era ===
In the late 1990s and early 2000s, Western critics coined “Asian Extreme” for a wave of Japanese and other East Asian films that combined supernatural horror with graphic violence and sexual transgression. Key early entries include Ring (1998), Audition (1999), Battle Royale (2000), Ichi the Killer (2001) and Oldboy (2003). Directors such as Takashi Miike and Park Chan‑wook pushed splatter and torture visually to new levels. While not all films in this category managed to reach the extremity of later entries, their violent and transgressive content helped coin the label "extreme cinema" as a term to describe such movies. This era also marked a shift where extreme content was not just for shock, but was a form of stylization.

The Japanese film, Grotesque (2009), quickly became notorious due to its graphic violence, leading it to be rejected by the BBFC, as the story follows a sadistic doctor who tortures a young couple after abducting them.

=== New French Extremity and Balkan Shock Cinema ===
In a 2004 Artforum essay, James Quandt labeled a cluster of early‑2000s French films "New French Extremity", noting their blend of arthouse style and unrelenting body horror. Films such as Irréversible (2002), Inside (2007), and Martyrs (2008) typify this period's formal experimentation and nihilistic violence. Irréversible became one of the most notable of these extreme French films due to having a graphic 10-minute-long rape scene, as well as graphic violence in a scene where a man beats another character to death with a fire extinguisher.

One of the most notorious examples of extreme cinema is A Serbian Film (2010), which exploited taboos of sexual violence towards children and necrophilia as allegories of Serbia's political and cultural exploitation. This film is considered to be one of the most disturbing movies of all-time, and was banned in six different countries, including Australia.

=== American avant-garde experimental films ===
As distribution shifted from VHS to DVD, Blu-ray, and video on demand, low-budget American directors kept testing the limits of what they could get away with. The Bunny Game (2011) was banned in the UK for its prolonged depiction of a prostitute being abducted and subjected to prolonged sexual and physical violence, with the BBFC citing that the content would risk potential harm to the public and would violate the Video Recordings Act 1984. The film, Reality Killers (2005), was also banned due to the film possessing extreme focus on sadism and violence, where the narrator endorses the actions of the killers, while women are treated as sexual objects that are meant to be abused.

=== Extreme horror franchises ===
The first Saw movie made over $100 million worldwide on a budget of $1 million, being a strong box-office success. This led to more than ten Saw movies being made and the franchise becoming one of the most successful horror franchises.

Another extreme horror film that became a franchise was Terrifier, a film about Art the Clown, a slasher villain known for his extremely brutal and torturous kills, which caused the franchise to be well known for its graphic violence. Due to this, Damien Leone decided not to allow any of the Terrifier films to be rated by the MPA to avoid the NC-17 rating. Terrifier 3, the third entry in the franchise, would later go on to make over $90 million worldwide on a budget of $2 million, becoming the highest-grossing unrated film.

== Notable films ==
Title	Year	Ref.
100 Tears	2007	
A Serbian Film	2010	
August Underground	2001	
August Underground's Mordum	2003	
August Underground's Penance	2007	
Act of Vengeance	1974	
Alipato: The Very Brief Life of an Ember	2016	
Angst	1983	
Antichrist	2009	
Audition	1999	
Auschwitz	2011	
Bad Taste	1987	
Banned from Television	1998	
Barbarian	2022	
Bandit Queen	1994	
Begotten	1989	
Benny's Video	1992	
Berberian Sound Studio	2012	
Be My Cat: A Film for Anne	2015	
Black Friday	2004	
Blonde	2022	
Blood Feast	1963	
Bloodsucking Freaks	1976	
Braindead	1992	
The Bridge	2006	
The Bunny Game	2010	
The Burning Moon	1992	
Caligula (unrated version)	1979	
Caligula... The Untold Story	1982	
Calvaire	2002	
Cannibal Holocaust	1980	
The Cook, the Thief, His Wife & Her Lover	1989	
Cannibal	2006	
Crash	1996	
Dancer in the Dark	2000	
The Devils	1971	
Dogtooth	2009	
Dogville	2003	
El Topo	1970	
The Empty Man	2020	
Enter the Void	2009	
Faces of Death	1978	
Fat Girl	2001	
Flower of Flesh and Blood	1985	
Frontier(s)	2007	
Funny Games	1997	
Gandu	2010	
The Girl Next Door	2007	
Grotesque	2009	
Gummo	1997	
The Green Elephant	1999	
Hacksaw	2020	
Hard to Die	1992	
Hate Crime	2012	
Hated: GG Allin and the Murder Junkies	1994	
Hellraiser	1987	
Henry: Portrait of a Serial Killer	1986	
High Tension	2003	
The Hills Have Eyes	1977	
Hostel	2005	
The House That Jack Built	2018	
The Human Centipede	2009	
Human Hibachi	2020	
Human Hibachi 2: Feast in the Forest	2022	
Human Hibachi 3: The Last Supper	2025	
I Spit on Your Grave	1978	
I Stand Alone	1998	
Ichi the Killer	2001	
The Idiots	1998	
Ilsa: She Wolf of the SS	1975	
Infinity Pool	2023	
Inside	2007	
In the Realm of the Senses	1976	
Intent to Kill	1992	
Irréversible	2002	
Jackass: The Movie	2002	
Julien Donkey-Boy	1999	
Kama Sutra: A Tale of Love	1996	
Kinatay	2009	
The Last House on the Left	1972	
Late Bloomer	2002	
Late Night with the Devil	2023	
Lilya 4-ever	2002	
The Machine Girl	2008	
Mad God	2021	
Maniac	1980	
Man Bites Dog	1992	
Mark of the Devil	1970	
Melancholia	2011	
Men Behind The Sun Quadriology	1988–1995	
Melancholie der Engel	2009	
Martyrs	2008	
Masking Threshold	2021	
Matrubhoomi	2003	
Megan is Missing	2011	
Meet the Feebles	1989	
Multiple Maniacs	1970	
Mysterious Skin	2004	
Naked Blood	1996	
Natural Born Killers	1994	
Nekromantik	1987	
Nymphomaniac	2013	
Oedipus Rex	1967	
Oldboy	2003	
Paanch	2003	
The Passion of the Christ	2004	
Pieces	1982	
Pigsty	1969	
Philosophy of a Knife	2008	
Pink Flamingos	1972	
The Poughkeepsie Tapes	2007	
Poultrygeist: Night of the Chicken Dead	2006	
Rambo 4	2008	
Re-Animator	1985	
Red Room	1999	
Red to Kill	1994	
Reflections of Evil	2002	
Relic	2020	
Requiem for a Dream	2000	
The Revenant	2015	
Schramm	1993	
Snuff 102	2007	
The Sadness	2021	
Salò, or the 120 Days of Sodom	1975	
Santa Sangre	1989	
Saw	2004	
Sick: The Life and Death of Bob Flanagan, Supermasochist	1997	
Slaughtered Vomit Dolls	2006	
Solvent	2024	
Snuff	1976	
Stille Nacht	1969	
The Substance	2024	
Suicide Club	2001	
Subconscious Cruelty	2000	
Sweet Movie	1974	
Talk to Me	2022	
Taxidermia	2006	
Terrifier	2016	
Terrifier 2	2022	
Terrifier 3	2024	
Tetsuo: The Iron Man	1989	
Thanatomorphose	2012	
Thriller: A Cruel Picture	1973	
Traces of Death	1993	
Trash Humpers	2009	
Trouble Every Day	2001	
Tumbling Doll of Flesh	1998	
Un Chien Andalou	1929	
Vase de Noces	1974	
We Are the Flesh	2016	
What is It?	2005	
Where the Dead Go to Die	2012	
Who Can Kill a Child	1976	
Who's Watching Oliver	2018	

== Notable directors ==
- Catherine Breillat
- Carlos Reygadas
- Coralie Fargeat
- Gaspar Noé
- Peter Jackson
- John Waters
- Alejandro Jodorowsky
- Julia Ducournau
- Wes Craven
- Uwe Boll
- Johannes Grenzfurthner
- Bruno Dumont
- Lars von Trier
- Takashi Miike
- Pier Paolo Pasolini
- Ken Russell
- Michael Haneke
- Lukas Moodysson
- Eli Roth
- Sion Sono
- Herschell Gordon Lewis
- Jim Van Bebber
- Lloyd Kaufman
- Harmony Korine
- Khavn De La Cruz

== Controversy and legacy ==
Extreme cinema is highly criticized and debated by film critics and the general public. There have been debates over how the graphic violence and sexual content in these films could pose a threat to 'mainstream' community standards.

There has also been criticism over the increasing use of violence in contemporary film. Ever since the emergence of slasher-gore films in the 1970s, the rising popularity of extreme cinema has contributed to casual violence in popular media. Some criticize the easy exposure and unintended targeting of adolescents by extreme cinema films.

Midnight movie favorite Pink Flamingos is inducted into the National Film Registry. Requiem for a Dream and Oldboy were named on the BBC's 100 Greatest Films of the 21st Century. The behind-the-scenes look at Cannibal Holocaust was the subject of a Season 2 episode of the documentary series Cursed Films.

At the 97th Academy Awards, The Substance was nominated for five awards, including Best Picture, Best Director (Coralie Fargeat), and Best Actress (Demi Moore). Coralie Fargeat was the ninth woman ever nominated for an Academy Award for Best Director.

== See also ==
- Art horror
- Dogme 95
- Exploitation film
- Giallo
- Graphic violence
- Grindhouse
- Mondo film
- New French Extremity
- Snuff film
- Social thriller
- Splat Pack
- Splatter film
- Vulgar auteurism

== Sources ==
- Totaro, Donato (2003). "Sex and Violence: Journey into Extreme Cinema". Offscreen. 7 (11).
- King, Mike (2009). The American Cinema of Excess: Extremes of the National Mind on Film. McFarland. ISBN 978-0-7864-3988-1.
- "Media's New Mood: Sexual Violence". Center for Media Literacy.
- Fyfe, Kristen. "More Violence, More Sex, More Troubled Kids." Media Research Center. MRC Culture, 11 Jan. 2007. Web. 9 Feb. 2016
- Pett, Emma (2 January 2015). "A new media landscape? The BBFC, extreme cinema as cult, and technological change". New Review of Film and Television Studies. 13 (1): 83–99. doi:10.1080/17400309.2014.982910. S2CID 146431677.
- Dirks, Tim. "100 Most Controversial Films of All Time." 100 Most Controversial Films of All Time. Filmsite, n.d. Web. 9 Feb. 2016.
- Sapolsky, Burry S.; Molitor, Fred; Luque, Sarah (March 2003). "Sex and Violence in Slasher Films: Re-examining the Assumptions". Journalism & Mass Communication Quarterly. 80 (1): 28–38. doi:10.1177/107769900308000103. S2CID 143908234.
- Sargent, James D; Heatherton, Todd F; Ahrens, M.Bridget; Dalton, Madeline A; Tickle, Jennifer J; Beach, Michael L (December 2002). "Adolescent exposure to extremely violent movies". Journal of Adolescent Health. 31 (6): 449–454. doi:10.1016/S1054-139X(02)00399-3. PMID 12457577.
