= August Underground's Mordum =

2003 American exploitation horror film by Fred Vogel

- DVD cover
- Directed by: Killjoy; Fred Vogel; Cristie Whiles; Jerami Cruise; Michael Todd Schneider
- Written by: Killjoy; Fred Vogel; Cristie Whiles; Jerami Cruise; Michael Todd Schneider
- Starring: Fred Vogel; Cristie Whiles; Michael Todd Schneider
- Edited by: Fred Vogel; Cristie Whiles; Jerami Cruise; Michael Todd Schneider
- Music by: NCO; Bippy; Gorelord; Wurdulak; Slave Pig; Impercept; Necrophagia; Superkollider; Porcelain Maggot
- Production company: Toetag Pictures
- Distributed by: Toetag Pictures
- Release date: 2003 (United States)
- Running time: 77 minutes
- Country: United States
- Language: English
- Budget: $300

August Underground's Mordum is a 2003 American direct-to-video horror exploitation film created and distributed by Toetag Pictures. It is the sequel to 2001's August Underground, and was followed by August Underground's Penance in 2007. The film is purposely shot in an amateur way to pass it off as a faux snuff film.

== Plot ==
Mordum is a home movie shot by serial killers Peter Mountain, his sadomasochistic girlfriend Crusty and her depraved man-child brother, Maggot. After Peter walks in on Crusty and Maggot having sex, an argument erupts between them. It is quelled when Crusty sexually arouses Peter and herself via self-mutilation with a piece of glass. The two then break into a crack house, where Peter beats the owner to death with a hammer.

Crusty films the filth-encrusted building and the decaying corpse of an overdosed addict. When Peter starts stripping the body of the house's owner, claiming it will be easier to dispose of without clothes, another fight breaks out between him and Crusty when she questions his motive for undressing the body, accusing him of being "a faggot."

Crusty demonstrates her love of self-harm to Maggot and a friend, cutting her scarred arm with a knife. Crusty and Maggot remove a bound and masked woman from a box they have been keeping her in for "a long time." Maggot rapes the woman while Crusty cheers him on and taunts the victim. When Maggot is finished, he then lets a male captive out of another box, and he and Crusty force him to perform a penectomy on himself with a pair of cuticle scissors, then seal him back up. Crusty mimics oral sex with it, then uses it to violate the female victim.

The trio of killers go to town, where they torment a shopkeeper, eat fast food, and wander around. Maggot and Peter then watch and masturbate to Crusty torturing two women, sexually abusing and repeatedly vomiting on them while a male corpse rots in the corner of the room. Eventually, the women are killed. Maggot disembowels one, chewing on her spilled innards and masturbating with them, while the other is beaten to death by Crusty and Peter, the latter dragging the body away to presumably have sex with it. They get drunk, and afterward, Maggot is found in the bathroom by Crusty, shaving and cutting himself to "look beautiful" for her.

The trio are next shown playing in the snow, attending a concert, meeting up with friends, raping a woman, and going to a piercing shop, where Maggot receives a nose ring and gets into a fight with Peter over his relationship with Crusty. The group then visit another serial killer, who shows them the contents of his shed; mutilated bodies, dying victims, and a headless and maggot-covered toddler, which Maggot eats a chunk of. Later, while the others are asleep, the new killer borrows their camera, and films himself taunting and slitting the throat of one of his female captives.

The trio attacks a family, killing the father first by hanging him. While Peter tortures the mother, Crusty watches Maggot have sex with the corpse of the young daughter in a bathtub. The three get into a fight, which escalates to Peter slitting the throat of the wife, while abusing Maggot with her blood. Peter threatens to kill Maggot and takes a knife. Maggot snatches the knife from his hand and holds it to his own throat. The final shot of the scene looks like Maggot is cutting his own throat. Maggot apparently kills himself, and Crusty's scream can be heard in the background. This, and Maggot's absence from the next film, suggests that he had probably cut his throat and died. In the post-credits scene, a cat is shown eating a mouse.

== Cast ==
- Cristie Whiles as Crusty
- Fred Vogel as Peter Mountain
- Michael Todd Schneider as Maggot
- Jerami Cruise as Man Shown Having Sex in Window
- Killjoy as Fourth Killer
- M. Kadath
- Erika Schultz
- E. Jay
- Midian Crosby as Brunette Vomit Torture Victim
- Elmo Painter as Blonde Vomit Torture Victim
- Dave Brown as Dead Man in Vomit Torture Sequence
- Art Ettinger as Male Friend
- Rick Kundrach as Jonesy
- Tim Grubjesik as Dead Junkie
- Allana Sleeth as Female Friend
- Shelby Vogel as Fourth Killer's Victim/Dead Mother
- Shannon Thames
- Chris Shaw as Dead Father
- Daisy as Daisy
- Superkollider

== Release ==
Schneider left the crew shortly after the wrap of production on Mordum. He released his own cut of the film, subtitled "The Maggot Cut", through Maggot Films, and the official cut of the film was released on DVD in 2003.

== Reception ==
The exploitation film database The Worldwide Celluloid Massacre has Mordum ranked as the fourth most "vile" film viewed by the website, below Salò, or the 120 Days of Sodom, The Angel's Melancholy and Carcinoma. The review of the film (which is categorized as "worthless") referred to it as "pointless hardcore depravity".

=== Controversy ===
While traveling to Canada to attend the Rue Morgue Festival of Fear in Toronto, co-director and writer Fred Vogel was arrested, pending charges of transporting obscene materials into Canada, when copies of Mordum and its predecessor were found by customs officials among the merchandise he had intended to bring to the convention. The charges were dropped, after Vogel had spent roughly ten hours in customs prison, and his films were sent to Ottawa for further observation.

Copies of Mordum were confiscated by Australian customs officials in 2004, the reason given for the seizure of the DVDs being that "they offend against the standards of morality, decency and propriety generally accepted by reasonable adults to the extent that they should not be imported".
