= Toetag Pictures =

American Independent horror film company

TOETAG Inc
- Type: Private
- Industry: Motion picture
- Founded: 2002
- Founders: Fred Vogel; Jerami Cruise
- Headquarters: Pennsylvania, Pittsburgh
- Key people: Fred Vogel (President); Jerami Cruise (Lead Special Effects); Shelby Vogel (Director of Marketing)
- Products: Film production
- Website: https://toetag.biz

Toetag Inc (stylized as TOETAG INC or ToeTag Inc) is an American Independent horror film company based in Pittsburgh, Pennsylvania. The company specializes in creating artistic visions of the macabre, known for edgy original content and award-winning Gore-EFX that is "cringe inducing and brutal." The company was founded by director Fred Vogel and special effects artist Jerami Cruise on April 1, 2004., and specializes in producing and distributing low-budget underground horror films. Cruise created the special effects department for Toetag Pictures, Toetag EFX, which would go on to work on Toetag Pictures films as well as independent productions. The company gained its notoriety for its August Underground film series. In 2010, Toetag Inc officially became incorporated and changed its name from Toetag Pictures to Toetag Inc. In 2014, the company began distributing films not made by Toetag via a new department, Toetag Releasing. Toetag Inc, Toetag EFX, and Toetag Releasing have all been on hiatus since 2015.

== Pre-Toetag Pictures ==
Before Toetag Pictures was founded, director Fred Vogel and special effects artist Jerami Cruise both attended the same university, the Art Institute of Pittsburgh, where they began shooting underground short films with a focus on gore and violence. After graduating from university, they made the first August Underground film together in 2001.

== History ==
Toetag Pictures was founded after the creation of August Underground's Mordum (a sequel to Toetag's 2001 exploitation horror film August Underground) in 2002. Following the success of August Underground and its sequel, Toetag Pictures was able to lease their first studio in Bellevue, Pennsylvania. Parts of the studio can be seen in the pseudo-documentary S&Man. Due to the continued success of Toetag, the company was able to move to a 7,000 sq ft studio in Pittsburgh. The team would go on to make seven films under the name Toetag Pictures before rebranding to Toetag Inc in 2010. The company lost its Pittsburgh studio that same year. After the Pittsburgh studio closed, Toetag went on to work on special effects for the segment "Wet Dream" in the horror anthology film The Theater Bizarre, and also contributed to SFX for the films White Reindeer (2013) and Fractured (2013). In 2012, Jerami Cruise moved the Toetag EFX department to Los Angeles, California. The company also opened a storefront in 2013 in Pittsburgh, Pennsylvania. In 2014, Toetag Inc created Toetag Releasing, which went on to distribute four films: "Arme/Lust", "Cross Bearer", "I Am No One", and "Deadwood Park". In 2015, Toetag Inc, Toetag EFX, and Toetag Releasing all went on hiatus.

== Toetag Pictures/Toetag Inc ==
Year	Film	Director	Notes and Awards
2001	August Underground	Fred Vogel	
2003	August Underground's Mordum	Fred Vogel	2003 Awarded Best Special EFX, Exofest II, Calgary, Canada
2004	Necrophagia: Sickness	Killjoy (musician); Fred Vogel	
2006	The Redsin Tower	Fred Vogel	Won Best Actress Freak Show Horror Film Festival; Best Special FX Makeup Freak Show Horror Film Festival
2007	August Underground's Penance	Fred Vogel	
2009	Murder Collection V.1	Fred Vogel; Shelby Vogel; Jerami Cruise	Voted Best Gore Scene of the Year, Rue Morgue Magazine
2009	MaskHead	Rebecca Swan; Fred Vogel	
2010	Sella Turcica	Fred Vogel	
2018	The Final Interview	Fred Vogel	Won Best Thriller, Nightmares Film Festival

== Toetag EFX ==
Year	Film	Director
2001	August Underground	Fred Vogel
2003	August Underground's Mordum	Fred Vogel
2004	Necrophagia: Sickness	Killjoy (musician); Fred Vogel
2004	Murder-Set-Pieces	Nick Palumbo
2005	Mutilation Mile	Ron Atkins
2006	The Redsin Tower	Fred Vogel
2007	August Underground's Penance	Fred Vogel
2007	Brutal Massacre	Stevan Mena
2008	Al Fin Y Al Cabo	Alfonso Rodríguez
2009	Hotel Chelsea (film)	Jorge Vald
2009	Murder Collection V.1	Fred Vogel; Shelby Vogel; Jerami Cruise
2009	Mutilation Mile	Ron Atkins
2009	MaskHead	Rebecca Swan; Fred Vogel
2010	Vacation!	Zack Clark
2010	Bereavement	Steven Mena
2010	Revenge Is Her Middle Name	Anthony Mathew
2010	Sella Turcica	Fred Vogel
2011	The Theatre Bizarre (segment Wet Dream)	Tom Savini
2011	White Reindeer	Zack Clark
2013	Fractured	Adam Gierasch

== Toetag Releasing ==
Year	Film	Director
2014	Arme/Lust	Keith Voigt Jr.
2014	Cross Bearer	Adam Ahlbrandt
2014	I Am No One	Jason Hoover
2015	Deadwood Park	Eric Stanze

== Controversy ==
The August Underground series has been banned in several countries, including Australia and New Zealand, due to its extreme content depicting violence and torture. The film was officially classified as "objectionable" in New Zealand in 2007.

While traveling to attend a film festival in Toronto, director Fred Vogel was arrested at the Canadian border, pending charges of transporting obscene materials into Canada after customs officials found copies of August Underground and its sequel. The charges were eventually dropped after Vogel spent approximately ten hours in customs prison.

== Fred Vogel ==
Fred Vogel was born on April 18, 1976, in Warren Township, New Jersey. He is an American writer, director, actor, and special effects artist best known for creating the August Underground series (2001–2007) and founding Toetag Pictures. His films are noted for their extreme realism in depicting violence. His first love of horror was sparked by James Whale's Frankenstein (1931), which made him fall in love with the horror genre and make-up.
