= Slaughtered Vomit Dolls =

2006 Canadian-American horror film

- DVD
- Directed by: Lucifer Valentine
- Written by: Lucifer Valentine
- Produced by: Randy Price
- Edited by: Shawn Fedorchuk
- Production company: Kingdom of Hell Productions
- Distributed by: Blacklava Entertainment; Unearthed Films; Kingdom of Hell Productions
- Release date: February 14, 2006 (Canada)
- Running time: 71 minutes
- Countries: Canada; United States
- Language: English

Slaughtered Vomit Dolls is a 2006 Canadian surrealist exploitation horror film written and directed by "Lucifer Valentine". who coined the subgenre of extreme horror movies known as "vomit gore." The film follows a very loose plot structure, consisting of assorted random scenes mostly revolving around Angela Aberdeen, a bulimic stripper-turned-prostitute.

Slaughtered Vomit Dolls is a part of the Vomit Gore Trilogy and was followed by two sequels: ReGOREgitated Sacrifice (2008) and Slow Torture Puke Chamber (2010). A fourth film – titled Vomit Gore 4: Black Mass of the Nazi Sex Wizard – was released in 2015. Most recently, in May 2020, the anthology film The Angela Chapters was released.

== Synopsis ==
Angela Aberdeen, a runaway suffering from bulimia and involved in prostitution, descends through a series of surreal and unnerving fragments consisting of hallucinations, emetophilia, abuse, and encounters with violent adversaries, culminating in her suicide.

== Plot ==
The film opens with a home video of young Angela Aberdeen talking about the first time she was on TV. It cuts to present-day Angela. The cameraman asks if she will do anything for him, to which she agrees. Various clips of Angela being choked are intercut with videos of her younger self. Angela begs the cameraman not to hurt her and recites the Lord’s Prayer. She introduces herself and announces a pact with the devil, renouncing her Christian faith and declaring, “Hail Satan.”

Later, Angela, while on the toilet in her undergarments, collapses and asks for help, struggling to stand up. The film then cuts to Angela listing prices for various sexual acts. A gonzo porn sex video is shown before cutting back to young Angela with horses.

A clip is shown of a naked woman named Pig making strange noises; subtitles claim she was executed on March 31, 1994.

Angela is shown sleeping, speaking unintelligibly while she does so. Pig cries and screams before her eyes are gouged out with a screwdriver, which is then used to repeatedly stab her in the head. More clips are shown of Angela sleeping before it cuts back to Pig vomiting on her disembodied eyes.

Angela calls herself a pig and says she’s “not here”. A close-up of her vomiting into a toilet is then shown. It then cuts to a clip of Angela in revealing clothing asking for the cameraman’s name before stripping. She takes a machete to her breast before the camera cuts.

A jumbled clip is shown with a subtitle reading, “Execution 002: April 1st, 1994”. Angela writhes around in bed. An unidentified woman is tied to a chair while the cameraman approaches her with a machete. Angela is then shown sleeping with the machete.

The unidentified woman is tortured and a man wearing a cowboy hat cuts her with the machete. The woman’s face is then removed.

The film cuts to the cameraman writing the word “BLISTERS” on Angela’s body while she explains how she went from being a stripper to a prostitute. She introduces herself as Blisters and several point-of-view shots are shown of Angela saying that she doesn’t care that she’s a missing person. Various shots of Angela crying are then shown before the cameraman grabs her face and she says, “I don’t know what’s left of me, but you can fuck it if you want.” A subsequent clip is shown of her saying she burned down her neighborhood church at age thirteen.

More clips are shown of Angela vomiting into a toilet and singing backwards. She then talks about how she likes being drunk before another clip shows her falling off the bed and discussing her dreams.

A clip is shown with a subtitle saying “Princess: executed; April 3rd, 1994”, featuring a woman discussing her life. The clip cuts to her being tortured, before her arm is amputated. Following the amputation, she is immediately handed a guitar, which she is now unable to play. She then writhes on the floor. A man is shown vomiting on a mirror. The man shoves the woman's severed arm down his throat to make himself vomit into a glass, from which he then drinks, and repeats the process.

Angela is depicted vomiting blood and applying makeup while her child self is shown on the television. The adult Angela strips on a pole before she says that she will do whatever the cameraman says.

A second unidentified woman has her throat slit and writhes on the floor. A man is then shown vomiting on the floor before his head is sawn open. Another man eats his brains and vomits into his empty skull cavity.

Miscellaneous clips of Angela vomiting and talking about her sexual abuse are shown before a montage of the previous unidentified women being executed.

The film ends as Angela drowns herself in a bathtub while her child self is shown on the television.

== Release and distribution ==
On September 9, 2005, Slaughtered Vomit Dolls was registered in the Canadian Copyright Database under the authorship of Shawn Fedorchuk. On February 14, 2006, Slaughtered Vomit Dolls was released on DVD through Kingdom of Hell Productions, and in June 2006 was made available digitally via a members-only monthly subscription service.

Following the dissolution of Kingdom of Hell Productions as a corporate entity in January 2009, Lucifer Valentine secured a distribution deal with Unearthed Films, who subsequently re-released the film on DVD on November 24, 2009, and again on January 24, 2012 as part of the Vomit Gore Trilogy box set. Both releases are now out of print.

Since 2014, Slaughtered Vomit Dolls has been distributed on DVD by Austrian extreme cinema label Blacklava Entertainment. The company released a limited edition 20th anniversary Blu-ray of the film in March 2026.

== Reception ==
JoBlo.com panned Slaughtered Vomit Dolls overall, saying that, while they were curious to see what the director could do next, the film "ultimately fails to either entertain, shock, or put forth any novel ideas." HorrorNews.net also gave a negative review, criticizing the film and stating, "If you need a movie to have some form of a linear story, don’t bother with this one. If you are tired of seeing women constantly berated and insulted and shown as weak and scared, don’t bother with this one. And if vomit isn’t your thing, yeah, definitely don’t bother with this one." DVD Talk reviewed the trilogy as a whole and gave it a mostly positive review, saying that the films would not appeal to every viewer and "for horror fans who want something different, something that mixes up art and sex and violence and gore and surrealism and who don't mind the confrontational nature of Valentine's work, this set is worth seeking out."
