= List of NC-17 rated films =

The MPA's "NC-17" rating symbol

NC-17 (No One 17 and Under Admitted) is the highest rating in the Motion Picture Association (MPA) film rating system used for films distributed in the United States. It is assigned to films the MPA believes most parents would consider "patently adult" and unsuitable for their children under 18. The rating does not designate films as pornographic or obscene, but simply that the content is suitable for adults only. This rating may be issued due to violence, horror, sex, drugs, or other elements.

The NC-17 rating replaced the X rating in 1990 as the X rating was not trademarked by the MPA and had been co-opted by the pornography industry. NC-17 originally stood for "No Children Under 17 Admitted" to combat the misconception that the rating indicated a film was pornographic. In 1996, the MPA reworded the NC-17 rating to "No One 17 and Under Admitted", effectively raising the minimum age for admission from 17 to 18.

This list includes films that received—and were released with—an NC-17 rating; films that received it but had it rescinded before release are not included. Rescissions occur most often in the form of re-ratings after edits, re-ratings on appeals, or studios surrendering the rating to leave the film unrated. The list provides the reason the rating was given for some films. The MPA began publishing the reasons for R ratings in 1990, and for all film ratings starting in 2000.

== List ==
Title	Release	Notes on rating
100 Tears	2007	Rated NC-17 "for extreme horror violence"
Arabian Nights (Il fiore delle mille e una notte)	1974	Rated X in 1979; name of rating changed to NC-17 in 1990.
Bad Education	2004	Rated NC-17 for a scene of explicit sexual content; kept rating after the MPAA upheld an appeal to overturn it. Edited "Special Edition" rated R for strong sexual content throughout, language and some drug use.
Bad Lieutenant	1992	Rated NC-17 for sexual violence, strong sexual situations & dialogue, graphic drug use; edited version rated R for drug use, language, violence, and nudity (the R-rated version was created only because the film's producers wanted the film to be carried by Blockbuster Video and the cost of creating the new edit and then receiving an R from an MPAA was expected to be much less than the amount of money it would earn in video rentals).
Bent	1997	Rated NC-17 for a strong scene of graphic sexuality; edited version rated R in 1998 for strong sexuality, including explicit sexual dialogue, some brutal violence, language and drug use.
Beyond the Valley of the Dolls	1970	Received NC-17 rating in 1990. Initially rated X, but re-rated after the rating symbol was adopted that year.
Bizarre	1991	Rated NC-17.
Blonde	2022	Rated NC-17 for some sexual content. First NC-17-rated film to be released on Netflix.
Blue Is the Warmest Colour	2013	Rated NC-17 "for explicit sexual content" The film was released with the NC-17 rating, yet took in over $19 million overall.
Broken English	1996	Rated NC-17 for explicit sexuality; edited version rated R for language, violence, and some drug content.
The Canterbury Tales (I Racconti di Canterbury)	1972	Originally rated X in 1979; name of rating changed to NC-17 in 1991.
Comfortably Numb	1995	Rated NC-17 for scenes of graphic drug use and some explicit sexuality.
The Cook, the Thief, His Wife & Her Lover	1989	Rated X in 1989. Later the symbol changed to NC-17 in 1990. Edited version for home video rated R.
Crash	1996	Rated NC-17 for numerous explicit sex scenes; edited version rated R for accident gore, some graphic language, and aberrant sexual content.
Dark Obsession (Diamond Skulls)	1989	Rated in 1991. Rated NC-17; edited version rated R for strong sensuality and for language.
Delta of Venus	1994	Rated in 1995. Rated NC-17 for explicit sexuality; edited version rated R for strong erotic content.
Descent	2007	Rated NC-17 "for a brutal rape"; edited version rated R "for brutal rape, language, some sexual content and drug use"
Dice Rules	1991	Rated NC-17. First film to be given an NC-17 rating for language alone.
A Dirty Shame	2004	Rated NC-17 for pervasive sexual content; "The Neuter Cut" (edited) version rated R for pervasive, strong, crude sexual content, including fetishes.
The Dolls	1991	Rated NC-17.
The Dreamers	2003	Rated in 2004. Rated NC-17 for explicit sexual content; edited version rated R for strong sexual content and graphic nudity, language and some drug use. Originally released with a NC-17 rating, the film grossed $2.5 million in its United States theatrical release.
Easyriders Video Magazine #13	1992	Rated NC-17 for pervasive sexuality and graphic sexual dialogue.
El Infierno	2011	Rated NC-17 for some graphic violence and explicit sexual content
Emmanuelle: The Joys of a Woman	1975	Originally rated X in 1976; rating symbol changed to NC-17 in 1991.
The Evil Dead	1981	NC-17 rating acquired in 1994. Rated NC-17 for substantial graphic horror violence and gore.
Female Trouble	1974	Originally X, rated NC-17 in 1999, re-rating NC-17 for explicit sexuality and nudity
Games of Love	1991	Rated NC-17.
Glam	1997	Rated in 1998. Rated NC-17 for a scene of explicit sexuality and some dialogue.
Henry & June	1990	First film to be rated NC-17.
Hell's Belles	1997	Rated NC-17 for pervasive sexuality and nudity.
The Hottest Bid	1995	Rated NC-17 for strong, graphic sexuality; kept rating after the MPAA upheld an appeal to overturn it.
In the Cold of the Night	1990	Rated X in 1990, just prior to the MPAA's adoption of the NC-17 rating. Edited version rated R in 1990.
In the Realm of the Senses (Ai no Korīda)	1976	Rated X in 1976, the rating symbol was changed to NC-17 in 1991.
Inserts	1975	Initially rated X, but re-rated in 1996 after the rating symbol was changed in 1990. Rated NC-17 for explicit sexuality.
Inside Deep Throat	2005	Rated NC-17 for explicit sexual content; edited version rated R for strong sexuality including graphic images, nudity and dialogue.
Intent to Kill	1992	Rated NC-17 for extreme violence. First film to receive the NC-17 rating for violence, not sex.
Ken Russell's The Devils	2026	Director's cut rated NC-17 in 2026 for "sexual content/graphic nudity".
Last Tango in Paris	1972	Rated NC-17 for some explicit sexual content. Rating in 1997. Initially rated X, but re-rated after the rating symbol was adopted in 1990.
La ley del deseo (Law of Desire)	1987	Rated in 2005. Originally rated X in 1987; re-rated NC-17 for a scene of explicit sexual content.
The Loves of Lady Chatterly	1992	For scenes of explicit sexuality.
Lucky Bastard	2013	Rated NC-17 "for explicit sexual content." The sex and violence resulted in the NC-17 rating, yet the MPAA given the film staff suggestions on how to improve it for an R rating. The staff declined, stating: "If we re-cut it we won't have any film left."
Lust, Caution	2007	Rated NC-17 "for some explicit sexuality"; edited version rated R for strong sexual content and a scene of brutal violence. Despite keeping the NC-17 rating, the film grossed $4.6 million in the United States theatrically, and Focus was very satisfied with the film's theatrical release. It has generated more than $18 million from DVD rentals in the United States.
Marie and Jack: A Hardcore Love Story	2002	Rated in 2007. Rated NC-17 "for explicit sexuality"
Ma Mère	2004	Rated in 2005. Rated NC-17 for strong and aberrant sexual content; edited version rated R for strong aberrant sexuality, some language, and violent images.
Marriage 2.0	2015	Rated NC-17 for explicit sexual content and graphic nudity throughout
Man Bites Dog (C'est arrivé près de chez vous)	1992	Rated NC-17 for strong graphic violence.
Matador	1986	Rated in 2005. Rated NC-17 in 2005 for aberrant sexuality including violence.
Maya & Samar	2025	Rated NC-17 for sexual content/graphic nudity.
Modern Love	1991	Rated NC-17
Myriam	1982	Rated in 1991. Rated NC-17
The Night Buffalo	2007	Rated NC-17 "for some graphic sexuality"
Orgazmo	1997	Rated NC-17 for explicit sexual content and dialogue; kept rating after the MPAA upheld an appeal to overturn it.
Paris, France	1993	Rated NC-17 for explicit sexual content; received rating in 1994.
Pink Flamingos	1972	1997 re-release rated NC-17 for a wide range of perversions in explicit detail.
Rodney Dangerfield: Nothin' Goes Right	1988	Initially rated X, but re-rated in 1991 after the rating symbol was changed in 1990. Rated NC-17.
Santa Sangre	1989	Rated NC-17 for several scenes of extremely explicit violence; edited version rated R for bizarre, graphic violence and sensuality, and for drug content.
The Secret Sex Lives of Romeo and Juliet	1969	Rated NC-17 in 1990.
Secretaries	2005	Rated NC-17 for pervasive graphic sexuality and nudity; received rating in 2006.
A Serbian Film	2010	Rated 2011. Rated NC-17 "for extreme aberrant sexual and violent content including explicit dialogue.
The Shadowed Mind	1988	Rated 1991. Rated NC-17.
Shame	2011	Rated NC-17 "for some explicit sexual content"
Showgirls	1995	Rated NC-17 for nudity and erotic sexuality throughout, and for some graphic language and sexual violence. (The film also had a "Sneak Preview" which was itself rated NC-17 for strong sexual images.) The only NC-17-rated film to be given a wide release in mainstream theaters.
Story of O	1975	Rated NC-17 in 2002 for sexual content.
Swearnet: The Movie	2014	Rated NC-17 for some explicit sexual content, graphic nudity and for language.
This One's For The Ladies: Uncensored	2018	Uncensored version rated NC-17 for "some explicit sexual images"
Tie Me Up! Tie Me Down!	1989	Rated in 1990, the year the NC-17 rating was first introduced. Rated NC-17 "for scene [sic] of strong adult sensuality with nudity".
Tokyo Decadence (Topāzu)	1991	Rated in 1993. Rated NC-17 for strong, explicit, sado-masochistic sexuality.
Tower of Terror	1992	For extreme horror violence.
Trois	2000	Rated NC-17 for some explicit sexuality, Edited version rated R for strong sexuality, language, and some violence
Tropic of Cancer	1970	Originally rated X; re-rated NC-17 in 1992 for strong language and sex-related dialogue.
Two Girls and a Guy	1997	Received rating in 1998. Rated NC-17 for a scene of explicit sexuality; kept rating after the MPAA upheld an appeal to overturn it. Edited version rated R for a strong sex scene, strong language and sexual dialogue, and for a violent image.
Wadd: The Life & Times of John C. Holmes	2003	Rated NC-17 for explicit sexual content; edited version rated R for strong sexual content, language, drug use, and some violent images.
Whore	1990	Rated NC-17; edited version rated R for strong sexual situations and dialogue, and for some violence. Unrated version also released.
Wide Sargasso Sea	1993	Rated in 1992. Rated NC-17 for strong, explicit sexuality; edited version rated R in 1993 for strong sexuality.
WVAG in New York City	2001	For graphic sexuality (short film).
Young Adam	2003	Theatrical version rated NC-17 for some explicit sexual content; edited version for home video rated R for strong sexual content, some disturbing behavior, and language.

== See also ==
- List of Hong Kong Category III films
- List of AO-rated video games
- Extreme cinema
