= List of films that most frequently use the word fuck =

The use of profanity in films has often been controversial but has increased significantly in recent decades. The Hays Code banned the use of profanity outright, but the Motion Picture Association established a system of ratings in 1968 to use as a guide for a wider range of permissible content. In 1970, M*A*S*H became the first mainstream American film under the system to use the word fuck. The word fuck is repeatedly used in the 2005 documentary film of the same name and is thought to be the vulgar term most used in film.

The Motion Picture Association film rating system assigns a PG-13 rating if the film contains the word used once and not in the context of sex. The R rating is normally required if the film contains more than two nonsexual utterances or if the word is used once in a nonsexual context, and another time in a sexual context. However, there are exceptions to the rule. Censors have been more lenient about the word in films that portray historical events. The ratings system is voluntary and there is no legal requirement that filmmakers submit every film.

== List ==
This is a list of English-language, non-pornographic feature films that contain at least 150 uses of the word fuck (or one of its derivatives), ordered by the number of such uses. Bronagh Gallagher and Joe Pesci are tied for total uses of the word by an actor.

Title	Year	Count	Running time (minutes)	Rate (per minute)	Ref.						
Swearnet: The Movie	2014	935 (Note: The Guinness World Records website lists the film as holding the record for the most swearing in one film, with 868 expletives. see Guinness World Records 2014)	112	8.35							
Fuck	2005	857 (Note: An earlier cut of the film, shown at the AFI Los Angeles International Film Festival, incorrectly stated the film contained 629 uses of the word fuck. see Hernandez 2005)	93	9.21							
The Wolf of Wall Street	2013	569 (Note: Sources vary with Vulture stating 569, Slate stating 544, and other sources reporting 506 citing Wikipedia (older version of article) as their source.)	180	3.16							
Uncut Gems	2019	560	135	4.15							
Anora	2024	479	139	3.45							
The Outpost	2019	445	126	3.53							
Summer of Sam	1999	435	142	3.06							
Nil by Mouth	1997	428	128	3.34							
Casino	1995	422	178	2.37							
Trailer Park Boys: Don't Legalize It	2014	422	95	4.44							
Alpha Dog	2006	420	122	3.44							
Standing on the Shoulders of Kitties	2024	412	111	3.71							
Small Engine Repair	2021	406	103	3.94							
Rise of the Footsoldier: The Pat Tate Story	2017	394	99	3.97							
Straight Outta Compton	2015	392	167	2.35							
Christmas Bloody Christmas	2022	387	87	4.45							
Rise of the Footsoldier: Origins	2021	385	107	3.60							
The Acid House	1998	382	111	3.44							
.45	2006	382	101	3.78							
End of Watch	2012	374	109	3.43							
Rise of the Footsoldier: Marbella	2019	354	85	4.16							
Ill Manors	2012	353	121	2.91							
I'm Still Here	2010	340	107	3.17							
Starred Up	2013	337	106	3.18							
This Is the End	2013	336	107	3.14							
Pride and Glory	2008	332	130	2.55							
The Rip	2026	325	112	2.90							
Free Fire	2016	323	90	3.19							
State Property	2002	321	88	3.65							
One Day Removals	2008	320	85	3.76							
Twin Town	1997	318	99	3.21							
Tiger Raid	2016	316	92	3.43							
Running Scared	2006	315	122	2.58							
Harsh Times	2006	314	116	2.71							
Sweet Sixteen	2002	313	106	2.95							
Martin Lawrence Live: Runteldat	2002	311	113	2.75							
Goon: Last of the Enforcers	2017	311	101	3.08							
Trailer Park Boys: Countdown to Liquor Day	2009	310	102	3.04							
Whiteboyz	1999	305	92	3.15							
Menace II Society	1993	305	97	3.14							
Goodfellas	1990	300	145	2.07							
Trapdog	2026	298	104	2.72							
Crown Vic	2019	295	110	2.64							
Supremacy	2014	293	110	2.66							
Another Day in Paradise	1998	291	101	2.88							
Made	2001	291	94	3.10							
White Men Can't Jump	2023	289	101	2.96							
Goat	2016	289	96	3.01							
Malcolm & Marie	2021	289	106	2.73							
The Long Walk	2025	286	108	2.65							
Rise of the Footsoldier	2007	283	119	2.38							
Brooklyn's Finest	2009	283	132	2.14							
The Big Lebowski	1998	281	117	2.40							
Dirty	2005	280	97	2.89							
Jarhead	2005	278	123	2.26							
This Is England	2006	277	101	2.74							
Cherry	2021	276	140	1.97							
Reservoir Dogs	1992	269	99	2.72							
Criminal Activities	2015	268	94	2.64							
Narc	2002	266	102	2.53							
Pulp Fiction	1994	265	154	1.72							
London	2005	264	92	2.81							
Mob Cops	2025	263	87	2.86							
FUBAR	2002	262	89	2.84							
Heaven Knows What	2014	259	97	2.67							
The Departed	2006	258	151	1.71							
Black Mass	2015	254	123	2.07							
Semper Fi	2019	253	99	2.21							
All Eyez on Me	2017	253	140	1.80							
A Guide to Recognizing Your Saints	2006	252	98	2.57							
Wheelman	2017	251	82	2.68							
Tangerine	2015	249	88	2.62							
Human Traffic	1999	249	99	2.51							
Bill Burr: Paper Tiger	2019	248	67	3.70							
State Property 2	2005	248	94	2.64							
Oasis: Supersonic	2016	243	122	1.99							
Do the Right Thing	1989	240	120	2.00							
The Boondock Saints	1999	239	108	2.21							
Junk	2024	239	99	2.41							
Infamous	2020	238	100	2.38							
Empire	2002	236	90	2.62							
True Romance	1993	234	118	1.98							
State of Grace	1990	234	134	1.75							
Sumotherhood	2023	233	97	2.40							
Deadgirl	2008	232	101	2.30							
Resolution	2012	231	93	2.48							
Goon	2011	231	92	2.51							
My Name Is Joe	1998	230	105	2.19							
Eddie Murphy Delirious	1983	230	69	3.35							
Redirected	2014	229	99	2.31							
Bill Burr: Live at Red Rocks	2022	228	82	2.78							
Red Rocket	2021	228	130	1.75							
Gridlock'd	1997	227	91	2.49							
Big Money Hustlas	2000	227	97	2.44							
Kid Cannabis	2014	226	109	2.07							
V/H/S	2012	225	116	1.94							
The Devil's Rejects	2005	224	109	2.06							
The Wall	2017	224	88	2.54							
Abigail	2024	224	109	2.06							
Eddie Murphy Raw	1987	223	90	2.48							
Suicide Kings	1997	222	106	2.09							
Sabotage	2014	222	109	2.04							
The Football Factory	2004	221	91	2.44							
Perrier's Bounty	2009	221	88	2.41							
Katt Williams: Priceless: Afterlife	2014	221	58	3.81							
August Underground's Penance	2007	221	84	2.63							
Snack Shack	2024	221	112	1.97							
Richard Pryor: Live on the Sunset Strip	1982	221	81	2.72							
Adam Sandler: Love You	2024	220	74	2.97							
22 Jump Street	2014	220	112	1.69							
On the Count of Three	2021	220	86	2.55							
Jay and Silent Bob Strike Back	2001	219	104	2.11							
Zack and Miri Make a Porno	2008	219	102	2.15							
Empire State	2013	218	94	2.32							
The Instigators	2024	218	101	2.45							
30 Minutes or Less	2011	218	83	2.63							
Killerman	2019	217	112	1.93							
Katt Williams: American Hustle	2007	217	89	2.41							
21 & Over	2013	216	93	2.32							
Black and White	1999	215	98	2.19							
Jackass Number Two	2006	215	92	2.34							
Dinner in America	2020	215	106	1.94							
The Tax Collector	2020	215	95	2.26							
The Dirt	2019	214	107	1.92							
Katt Williams: The Pimp Chronicles Pt.1	2006	214	45	4.76							
Primitive War	2025	214	133	1.60							
American History X	1998	214	119	1.80							
The Original Kings of Comedy	2000	213	115	1.85							
God Is a Bullet	2023	213	156	1.37							
Richard Pryor: Here and Now	1983	213	95	2.24							
Hot Tub Time Machine	2010	212	99	2.14							
Killing Them Softly	2012	211	97	2.18							
Green Street	2005	211	109	1.94							
Avengement	2019	211	88	2.40							
August Underground	2001	210	70	3.00							
Fair Play	2023	210	113	1.92							
Snipes	2001	210	113	1.92							
Monument Ave.	1998	210	93	2.26							
Layer Cake	2004	210	105	2.00							
Neds	2010	209	124	1.68							
Cass	2008	209	108	1.93							
Brotherhood	2010	208	80	2.60							
Project X	2012	208	88	2.36							
American Heist	2014	207	94	2.20							
Scarface	1983	207	170	1.22							
Wildcat	2025	206	99	2.08							
Everybody Wants Some!!	2016	206	116	1.77							
Sid and Nancy	1986	205	112	1.83							
Bullet	1996	204	96	2.12							
Spun	2002	203	101	2.01							
Rise of the Footsoldier: Part II	2015	203	111	1.82							
American Honey	2016	203	164	1.23							
Who Killed Cooper Dunn?	2022	202	90	2.24							
Babylon	2022	201	189	1.06							
Foolish	1999	200	97	2.06							
Dysfunktional Family	2003	200	89	2.25							
8 Mile	2002	200	110	1.82							
Skin	2019	200	110	1.82							
Superbad	2007	200	118	1.69							
The Underdoggs	2024	198	96	2.06							
The Business	2005	197	97	2.03							
I Got the Hook-Up	1998	197	93	2.12							
Hood of the Living Dead	2005	196	90	2.27							
Born on the Fourth of July	1989	196	145	1.35							
Good Time	2017	195	101	1.91							
It's What's Inside	2024	195	103	1.89							
Guns Akimbo	2019	194	98	1.94							
Lone Survivor	2013	193	121	1.59							
Next Day Air	2009	193	84	2.30							
Rob the Mob	2014	192	104	1.79							
Bully	2001	192	112	1.71							
Overnight	2003	191	82	2.33							
Ten Benny (Note: Also known as Nothing to Lose)	1996	190	108	1.76							
Magnolia	1999	190	188	1.01							
Smoking Guns	2016	190	93	1.86							
The Boondock Saints II: All Saints Day	2009	190	118	1.61							
Wasteman	2025	189	90	2.10							
Bad Man	2025	189	98	2.02							
Road House	2024	189	123	1.54							
Thanksgiving	2023	189	106	1.71							
Monster	2003	187	109	1.72							
Belly	1998	186	92	2.02							
Smile 2	2024	186	127	1.46							
The Grey	2012	186	117	1.58							
Inside Man	2023	185	91	2.03							
Clockers	1995	185	128	1.45							
Get Rich or Die Tryin'	2005	185	117	1.58							
3 from Hell	2019	184	115	1.60							
Bodies Bodies Bodies	2022	183	94	1.95							
The Angels' Share	2012	182	101	1.80							
Patriots' Day	2016	182	133	1.36							
Paranormal Activity: The Marked Ones	2014	181	84	2.15							
Bad Santa 2	2016	180	92	1.96							
Strays	2023	180	93	1.94							
Urban Justice	2007	180	97	1.91							
American Animals	2018	179	116	1.54							
Gangster No. 1	2000	179	103	1.68							
Emergency	2022	179	105	1.70							
Bodied	2017	179	121	1.48							
Adulthood	2008	178	95	1.87							
Jay and Silent Bob Reboot	2019	178	105	1.70							
Sorry to Bother You	2018	178	112	1.58							
Caught Stealing	2025	178	107	1.66							
Good Mourning	2022	177	93	1.79							
Silk Road	2021	177	112	1.58							
Over Your Dead Body	2026	177	107	1.65							
All About the Benjamins	2002	176	98	1.79							
The 51st State	2001	176	92	1.91							
Slam	1998	176	100	1.76							
Bring Him to Me	2023	175	96	1.87							
Poetic Justice	1993	175	109	1.61							
Play Dirty	2025	175	125	1.58							
That's My Boy	2012	175	114	1.69							
Assassination Nation	2018	174	108	1.61							
The Town	2010	174	124	1.40							
Sausage Party	2016	173	89	1.94							
Tigerland	2000	173	101	1.71							
Bad Santa	2003	173	91	1.90							
31	2016	173	102	1.70							
Neighbors	2014	173	97	1.78							
Old Dads	2023	173	104	1.66							
Donnie Brasco	1997	172	127	1.35							
Legend	2015	171	131	1.31							
Mid90s	2018	171	85	2.01							
Coffee & Kareem	2020	171	88	1.94							
Backstage	2000	170	86	1.98							
Paid in Full	2002	170	97	1.87							
Grindhouse	2007	169	191	0.88							
Dolemite Is My Name	2019	169	118	1.43							
They Cloned Tyrone	2023	169	122	1.39							
Odyssey	2025	169	111	1.52							
War Pony	2022	169	115	1.46							
The Commitments	1991	169	118	1.43							
Fury	2014	168	134	1.25							
Naked	1993	168	131	1.28							
Duchess	2024	168	114	1.55							
Copshop	2021	168	107	1.57							
Four Rooms	1995	168	98	1.71							
Death of a Dynasty	2003	167	92	1.82							
44 Inch Chest	2009	167	95	1.76							
Contraband	2012	167	111	1.50							
War Dogs	2016	166	114	1.46							
Studio 666	2022	166	106	1.57							
Gang Related	1997	165	110	1.50							
Eenie Meanie	2025	165	110	1.49							
District 9	2009	165	112	1.47							
Hot Tub Time Machine 2	2015	165	93	1.77							
Wrath of Man	2021	165	119	1.39							
Notorious	2009	165	123	1.34							
Son of a Gun	2014	165	108	1.53							
Boogie Nights	1997	164	155	1.06							
Crank: High Voltage	2009	164	96	1.71							
Calm with Horses	2019	164	100	1.64							
Magic Mike	2012	164	110	1.49							
Pitfall	2025	164	108	1.56							
Muck	2015	164	90	1.82							
Blood In Blood Out	1993	163	190	0.86							
Hostel: Part III	2011	162	88	1.84							
Bosco	2024	161	99	1.65							
Dirty Grandpa	2016	161	102	1.58							
Trailer Park Boys: The Movie	2006	161	95	1.69							
Pineapple Express	2008	161	112	1.44							
True History of the Kelly Gang	2019	161	125	1.28							
5lbs of Pressure	2024	161	111	1.43							
Dope	2015	160	103	1.45							
El Chicano	2018	160	108	1.40							
Asphalt City	2024	160	125	1.28							
Oasis: Don't Look Back in Anger	2026	160	123	1.30							
Platoon	1986	159	120	1.33							
The Place Beyond the Pines	2012	159	140	1.13							
Trespass Against Us	2016	158	99	1.59							
Blue Collar	1978	158	114	1.39							
The Wrecking Crew	2026	158	124	1.27							
Spike Island	2012	158	105	1.50							
Colors	1988	157	120	1.31							
Dead Presidents	1995	157	119	1.32							
The Night Before	2015	157	101	1.61		'	London Boulevard	2010	157	103	1.59
Kidulthood	2006	156	92	1.70							
Blue Iguana	2018	156	100	1.62							
Supercon	2018	155	100	1.61							
Fist Fight	2017	155	91	1.70							
Vanish	2015	154	80	1.91							
The Blair Witch Project	1999	154	81	1.90							
Good Will Hunting	1997	154	126	1.22							
Bad Boys II	2003	153	147	1.04							
War on Everyone	2016	153	98	1.56							
Dead Fish	2005	153	98	1.56							
Pain & Gain	2013	153	129	1.19							
Streets of Blood	2009	153	95	1.61							
The Fighter	2010	153	116	1.31							
The Price We Pay	2022	153	85	1.80							
Game Over, Man!	2018	152	101	1.53							
Heist	2015	152	93	1.61							
Resident Evil	2026	152	94	1.60							
Lights Out	2024	151	90	1.64							
Ash Wednesday	2002	151	99	1.52							
Funny People	2009	151	146	1.03							
Tony	2026	151	106	1.44							
Intermission	2003	151	102	1.48							
Smokin' Stogies	2001	151	98	1.54							
Soul Men	2008	151	100	1.51							
Filth	2013	151	97	1.55							
Green Street 2: Stand Your Ground	2009	150	94	1.22							
Mike & Nick & Nick & Alice	2026	150	107	1.43							
Catch .44	2011	150	94	1.59							
Chopper	2000	150	94	1.59							
All Day and a Night	2020	150	121	1.24							
Clerks III	2022	150	115	1.30							

== Sources ==
- Family Media Guide: Source for profanity counts, now defunct. The reviews are still available in the Internet Archive's Wayback Machine.
- Preview Online: Source for profanity counts, now defunct. The reviews are still available in the Internet Archive's Wayback Machine.
- Filmy Age Rating: Source for profanity counts
- Screen It! Entertainment Reviews: Source for profanity counts
- Guide For Parents: Source for profanity counts
- Kids in mind: Source for profanity counts
- Filmy Rating Reviews: Source for profanity counts
- Springfield! Springfield!: Source for profanity counts
- Movie F Words: Source for profanity counts
- Guinness World Records (2014). "Most swearing in one film". Guinness World Records. "The record was verified in London, UK, on 12 September 2014."
- Hernandez, Eugene (November 10, 2005). "Dispatch from L.A.: Four-Letter Word Film Explores the Etymology of an Expletive". IndieWire. Archived from the original on May 12, 2006. "When all is said and done, the word Fuck is used 629 times in the film."
- Filmy Rating: Source for profanity counts
