= Intent to Kill =

Intent to Kill may refer to:

- Intent to Kill (1958 film), a British film noir thriller
- Intent to Kill (1992 film), an action, independent and thriller film
- Voluntary manslaughter, a legal term
