= Vomit Gore Trilogy =

Surreal horror film series by Lucifer Valentine

The Vomit Gore Trilogy is a feature film trilogy of Canadian surrealist extreme horror films written and directed by Lucifer Valentine. The first two installments were produced by Randy Price (as No One Body). Valentine coined "vomit gore" as a new subgenre to describe the trilogy, which follows a nonlinear narrative that centers around teenage runaway Angela Aberdeen, a stripper who suffers from bulimia. The trilogy focuses primarily on situations involving vomiting, cannibalism, graphic sexual violence, gore, torture, and murder.

All three of the films received limited theatrical releases and were released on DVD by distributor Unearthed Films. The trilogy was mostly panned by critics, who criticized its deliberately offensive and obscene content and depictions of violence against women.

== Films ==
=== Slaughtered Vomit Dolls (2006) ===
In order to make ends meet, Angela Aberdeen begins working as a prostitute. As her bulimia worsens, she begins to experience a series of hallucinations where she experiences visions of the deaths of her fellow strippers as well as various others. The film had a simultaneous DVD and limited theatrical release on February 14, 2006.

=== ReGOREgitated Sacrifice (2008) ===
Angela, now in hell, encounters two twin succubi who sexually and violently torture and abuse her. The film had a simultaneous DVD and limited theatrical release on June 13, 2008. Critics limited release due to violence.

=== Slow Torture Puke Chamber (2010) ===
Angela returns from hell to stalk and destroy another victim like she did before. Her return shows that she developed a new version of herself as she is painfully infected by the devil's curse, and slowly the two Angelas merge together to create a perfect child of Satan. The final film in the trilogy, released on July 27, 2010.

=== Black Mass of the Nazi Sex Wizard (2015) ===
A prequel to the previous three films. A satanic ritual spawns infinite incarnations of Angela, as she is doomed to become the lost girl in every incarnation. This film, released July 24, 2015, was distributed by Black Lava Entertainment, along with re-releases of Slaughtered Vomit Dolls and ReGOREgitated Sacrifice.

== See also ==
- Emetophilia
