= Cross-bearer (disambiguation) =

Cross-bearer is a position in some Christian churches.

Crossbearer or Cross Bearer may also refer to:

- Cross Bearer, a 2013 horror film
- The Cross Bearer, a 1918 film produced by the World Film Company
- Crossbearer, a 1992 album by Starkweather
- "Crossbearer", a 1997 track by Cave In, from the album Beyond Hypothermia
- Crossbearer: A Memoir of Faith, a 2008 book by Joe Eszterhas
