= Mutilation Mile =

- Directed by: Ron Atkins
- Written by: Ron Atkins
- Produced by: Ron Atkins
- Starring: Lawrence Bucher; Daniel McCabe
- Cinematography: Ron Atkins
- Edited by: Ron Atkins
- Music by: Kristian Day
- Production company: Atkins Entertainment
- Distributed by: Atkins Entertainment
- Release date: July 24, 2009
- Running time: 82 minutes
- Country: United States
- Language: English

Mutilation Mile is a 2009 American horror film shot, edited, written, produced, and directed by Ron Atkins. The film stars Lawrence Bucher and Daniel McCabe as Jack and Jimmy DeGrasso, who, on a mission to find the killer of their beloved uncle Sal, murder everyone who crosses their path.

The word "fuck" is used 664 times in the film's 82-minute running time, making it third on the list of films that most frequently uses the word.

== Cast ==
- Lawrence Bucher as Jack DeGrasso
- Daniel McCabe as Jimmy DeGrasso
- Paul Dalleluche as Sal DeGrasso
- Susan Bull as Roxy Jane
- Dennis Cadena as Freddy "The Fly" Jones
- Toni Ferrari as The Hitchhiker
- Steven Hayden as The Hitman
- Terry Hernandez as The Freak
- Tanya Jones as Mary
- Tammy Kanagy as Jackie

== Release ==
The film received positive reviews from horror critics. Film Threat gave it three-and-a-half stars out of a possible four.

Horrornews.net notes that "MM fits nicely into a category of extreme crime and extreme violence like a welcoming cousin. Probably more attuned to sit closer to on-your-shelf films like A Serbian Film, Kalifornia, and I Stand Alone than say Saw or Hostel. The film doesn't need subtitles, but it might be a recommended option for viewers who feel weird about 90 minutes of intense screaming bellowing out and disturbing your neighbors."
