= The Redsin Tower =

2002 film by TOETAG Inc

- Directed by: Fred Vogel
- Written by: Fred Vogel; Shelby Lyn Vogel
- Produced by: Fred Vogel
- Starring: Bethany Newell; Perry Tiberio; Jessica Kennedy; Meghan O’Halloran
- Cinematography: Shane Sauer
- Edited by: Bruce Hauver II
- Distributed by: TOETAG INC
- Release date: October 10, 2007
- Running time: 87 minutes
- Country: United States
- Language: English

The Redsin Tower is a 2006 indie low-budget horror film directed by Fred Vogel and written by Fred and Shelby Lyn Vogel. This is the third film produced and distributed by TOETAG INC, and the first film in their filmography to be a traditional three-act narrative. The Redsin Tower is noteworthy for its use of excessive gore, violence, and psychological horror. The plot centers around Kim, a girl trying to get over her ex-boyfriend by taking a trip with her friends to the Redsin tower, where the partying quickly becomes a fight for their lives. The film was distributed and released on DVD on October 10, 2007, by TOETAG INC.

== Cast ==
Bethany Newell as Kim Abrahams
Perry Tiberio as Mitch Allen
Jessica Kennedy as Becky Adams
Meghan O'Halloran as Emily Dickson
Peter Schmidt as Phil Pepper
Billy D. Martin as Carl Hinze
A.C. Earing as Steve Jacobs
Fred Vogel as Curtis Pepper
Shelby Jackson as Sandy
Kathie McDermitt as Smoking Woman
Nathaniel DeMarco as Big Ed
Cristie Whiles as Redsin's Wife
Jerami Cruise as Mateo Redsin

== Release ==
The Redsin Tower initially premiered at Pioneer Theater in Manhattan on October 29, 2006. The film went on to be played at Fantasia 2007 and Freak Show Horror Film Festival 2007 in Orlando.

=== Awards ===
Year	Festival	Award	Recipients
2007	Freak Show Horror Film Festival	Best Actress	Bethany Newell
2007	Freak Show Horror Film Festival	Best Special FX Makeup	Jerami Cruise

== Reception ==
Horror society says “The Redsin Tower is a surprisingly well-shot horror film” in comparison to TOETAG Inc's previous August Underground series, giving the film a rating of 3.5/5. Jay Alan from Horror News wrote that “There are guts pouring, heads rolling, maggots and blood squirting, grotesque vomiting and the absolute best ax murder I’ve ever seen. “ Johnny Butane of Dead Central writes, "The horrible things that happen to these kids [are] spaced out in such a way that the actions fit into the overall narrative quite nicely, which makes the film as a whole even more enjoyable."
