= Viking Crown =

Black metal band; side project of Phil Anselmo

- Origin: New Orleans, Louisiana, U.S.
- Genres: Black metal
- Years active: 1994–2001
- Labels: Baphomet; Season of Mist
- Past members: Phil Anselmo; Killjoy; Opal Anselmo

Viking Crown was a side project started by heavy metal musician Phil Anselmo in the mid-1990s. The first Viking Crown release was an EP recorded in 1994 titled Unorthodox Steps of Ritual which featured Anselmo, credited as Anton Crowley, on guitar, bass, drums and vocals. The two later releases would feature Necrophagia frontman Killjoy on vocals and Anselmo's now-ex-wife Stephanie Opal Weinstein on keyboards. Killjoy would later go on to describe Viking Crown as "a selfish band in which we recorded without regard for conventional methods, songwriting, or any goals except to make truly dark depressing, lo-fi black metal that we liked." Following an interview in which Anselmo regarded the project as a joke, there was a fallout between himself and Killjoy that would culminate in Anselmo leaving all Baphomet Records related projects altogether.

== Band members ==
- Phil Anselmo (as Anton Crowley) – vocals, guitars, bass, drums
- Killjoy – vocals
- Stephanie Opal Weinstein (as Opal Enthroned) – keyboards

== Discography ==
Date of release	Title	Label	US sales
1999	Unorthodox Steps of Ritual (EP)	Baphomet Records	177,000+
April 11, 2000	Innocence from Hell	Baphomet Records	211,000+
November 13, 2001	Banished Rhythmic Hate	Renegade Records/Season of Mist	129,000+

== Sources ==
- Rock Detector
- Album Review - Chronicles of Chaos
- Allmusic biography
- 2001 Album Review - Allmusic
