= Murder Collection V.1 =

2009 film by Fred Vogel

- DVD released by Toetag Pictures
- Directed by: Fred Vogel
- Written by: Fred Vogel; Don Moore; Jerami Cruise; Shelby Lyn Vogel
- Story by: Fred Vogel; Don Moore; Jerami Cruise; Shelby Lyn Vogel
- Produced by: Shelby Vogel
- Cinematography: Fred Vogel; Shelby Lyn Vogel; Robert L. Lucas
- Edited by: Jason Kollat; J. Harland Lockhart; Rick Weller
- Music by: Die Toten
- Production company: Toetag Pictures
- Distributed by: Toetag Pictures
- Release date: May 1, 2009 (United States)
- Running time: 82 minutes
- Country: United States
- Languages: English; Russian; Japanese

Murder Collection V.1 is a 2009 American horror anthology film written and directed by Fred Vogel, and co-written by Don Moore, Shelby Vogel, and Jerami Cruise.

== Plot ==
The film's opening explains that in 1994 a web series called Murder, which broadcast footage of actual deaths and acts of violence, appeared. After being active for four months, Murder was shut down by the authorities and had all of its content confiscated, though the website's host, a man known only as Balan, evaded capture. Now, years later, Balan has reemerged to share more clips that he has unearthed, while also offering commentary on people's obsession with death, the effect it has on them, and how accessible new media has made it. The series of videos is kicked off by Balan querying, "I ask you all... Why are you watching? Are you trying to find reality? Do you feel the need to be shocked? To witness something that human eyes shouldn't see? Murder is reality. Death comes when you least expect it. With what you are about to observe, you may question your own integrity. You will ask, could this happen to me? My answer to you is... Yes it can."

- Bludgeoning: In Russia, a drunk man accidentally beats his teenage son to death in front of the son's webcam.
- The Heist: A restaurant's security system records a robbery committed by four gunmen, who shoot a cashier in the head and a fleeing customer in the back.
- The Cheat: In front of a stationary camera, Greg reminisces about how he met his wife, and about all of the good times that they shared, while a monitor in the background shows his wife having sex with someone else. Greg leaves the room, and the monitor shows him barging in on his wife and her lover, hacking the former to death with an ax before cutting out her heart, which the wife had once said would always belong to him.
- S&G: A parking lot security camera catches two people attacking a couple, beating the man with a baseball bat, and abducting the woman.
- Broadway Rob: The distorted home movie of a pedophile named Broadway Rob who forces two gagged boys, Shawn and Ben clad in only their socks and underwear to dance with him. Shawn tackles Rob, fatally strangling and stabbing him. Shawn and Ben flee, leaving Rob's dead body behind.
- Execution: A muffled black-and-white camcorder video of a hooded and masked group (possibly a cult or a gang) executing a man via decapitation in front of a woman, whom they taunt with the severed head before shooting her.
- ATM: A man is mugged and killed at an ATM.
- Autopsy: In Japan, autopsy footage of a woman who was shot in the mouth, with the bullet exiting the top of her skull. The coroner eventually kicks the cameraman out due to his unprofessional antics and inattentiveness.
- Bullied: A trio of drunks use a camcorder to record themselves taking a man out into the woods under the pretense of initiating him into their group. The three bully and humiliate the man and, during a scuffle, one of them accidentally knocks him onto the knife another was holding. The trio panic and bicker, and the camera is dropped when a fight breaks out over whether they should go for help.
- Homecoming: A building security camera records two figures garroting a man.
- Ransom: A deteriorated series of ransom videos depict three men brutalizing a senator's daughter, who eventually dies due to the severity of her injuries.

After the last clip, Balan delivers the closing statement, "You realize now it's everywhere. Death casts a shadow on all our faces. The new media shines light on dank crevasses, revealing moral decay and broken experiences that are better left beyond the pale. Goosebumps explode on my skin with every clip we watch. I feel it now more than ever. How do you feel?"

== Cast ==
- Opening Credits:
  - Mary Shore as The Victim
- Bludgeoning:
  - Daniel V. Klein as Father
  - Damien A. Maruscak as Son
- The Heist:
  - Sonny L. Shannon as The Manager
  - Matthew Plutko as The Cook
  - Shelby Lyn Vogel as The Tender
  - Sean L. Joyce as The Sprinter
  - Rebecca Tronzo as Topaz
  - Eric Schwartzbauer as Leon
  - Aziza as Madam Green
  - Don Moore as G.A. Moore
  - Aymee Peake as April
  - Chris Krzysik as The Barback
  - Mike Driscoll as The Gent
  - Michael Pacinda as PKC
  - Anthony Matthews as PKC
  - Fred Vogel as PKC
  - Jerami Cruise as PKC
- The Cheat:
  - Jason Schneeberger as Greg
  - Lexi Jade as The Adulteress
  - Scott Burke as The Adulterer
- S&G:
  - Shelby Lyn Vogel as Lyn
  - Jason Kollat as Michael
  - Jim Kollat as Jim
  - Anthony Matthews as Anthony
- Broadway Rob:
  - Tom Smith as Broadway Rob
  - Steve Schofield as Shawn
  - Tim Schofield as Ben
- Execution:
  - Jerami Cruise as The Executioner
  - John Viss as Chuck
  - John Ross as The Handler
  - Aymee Peake as Jill
  - Will Guffey as Smith
  - Fred Vogel as Black
- ATM:
  - Don Moore as The Banker
  - Douglass Bell as Ace
- Autopsy:
  - Dorian K. Arnold as The Doctor
- Bullied:
  - Adrian Alexander D'Amico as Cope
  - Dave Dalessandro as Jake
  - Michael Witherel as Castle
  - Jay Mattingly as Gromer
- Homecoming:
  - Stephen Vogel as Eddie the Rat
  - Kai Peter as Zack
  - Jason Spence as Hudson
- Ransom:
  - Harvey Daniels as Jovan
  - Claude Marrow as Sidel
  - Clint Brown as Deron
  - Lacey Fleming as Ginnifer Mitchell

== Reception ==
Ryan Doom of Arrow in the Head gave Murder Collection V.1 a 2/4 and wrote, "In the end, I think it's an interesting exercise, but I don't know if it makes it a good movie. This isn't the type of film that I suspect most viewers would revisit often, if at all. Instead, it's just an experiment that people will dig or not, depending on how much violence and gore they can stomach without a story for context. While it captivated me at times with certain segments, others seemed unnecessary or overdone. But maybe that's just me". Horror News's Jay Alan praised the special effects, also calling the acting "convincingly believable for the most part" and writing, "As much as the film focuses on the graphic and dark nature of death, it also delves into the human psyche and personalities of the characters within the little given time shown."
