= Tumbling Doll of Flesh =

1998 Japanese pornographic splatter film by Tamakichi Anaru

Japanese name
- Kanji: 肉だるま
Transcriptions
- Revised Hepburn: Niku Daruma
- Directed by: Tamakichi Anaru
- Written by: Tamakichi Anaru
- Starring: Kikurin; Yuuji Kitano; Kanako Ooba; Tamakichi Anaru
- Edited by: High Mega Pinoko
- Music by: Barom One
- Production company: Psycho
- Distributed by: Aroma Kikaku
- Release date: 1998 (Japan)
- Running time: 72 minutes
- Country: Japan
- Language: Japanese

Tumbling Doll of Flesh (肉だるま, "Niku Daruma") is a 1998 Japanese pornographic splatter horror film written and directed by Tamakichi Anaru. The film is noted for its very extreme content and gory imagery.

== Plot ==
Shown almost entirely through a stationary camera and a handheld one, the film follows Kana and Kiku, performers hired by two men to appear in an amateur pornographic film. The first parts show Kiku sucking Kana’s vagina. Then she sucks his penis after. After that, they begin having sex on camera. Once the first shoot ends, the directors, with kiku and kana celebrate the first shoot. After getting back to doing another one, the shoot incorporates BDSM acts. Kana’s anus gets gently lubed by a director while she is tied and Kiku is stimulating her vagina with a dildo. Then, another dildo goes inside her anus. She whines in discomfort and wriggles against the ropes. After that, wax play is done on her. Once the wax drips onto her buttocks, she cries out with every drop falling. Then she gets hit with a flogger repeatedly. After that, her anus gets lubed again to prepare her for an enema. Once the nozzle gets in, she sits up through the ropes after a few seconds of the enema. Disturbed by the escalation, Kana gets untied. She wears her clothing and while she is tying her shoes, she gets hit with a baseball bat. Her unconscious body then gets stripped and tied.

Kiku sexually assaults Kana while the director tortures and severely mutilates her, using drugs to keep her conscious. Kana is eventually killed. The director then turns on Kiku, attacking and killing him before making a telephone call, while the cameraman continues recording the bodies of both performers.

== Cast ==
- Kanako Ooba as Kana
- Kikurin as Kiku
- Tamakichi Anaru as Snuff Video Director
- Yuuji Kitano as Snuff Video Cameraman

== Alternate titles ==
- Judge for Yourself
- Niku Daruma
- Psycho
- Psycho: The Snuff Files
- Psycho: The Snuff Reels

== Reception ==
The film was regarded as being "as savage and brutal as they come" and further deemed "enough to make even the most hardcore horror/slasher fanatic go nauseous" by Prarthito Maity of the International Business Times.
