= Cross Bearer =

- DVD released by Toetag Pictures
- Directed by: Adam Ahlbrandt
- Written by: Adam Ahlbrandt
- Produced by: Natalie Jean; Doug Sakmann; Adam Ahlbrandt
- Starring: J.D. Brown; Tim Cronin; Kacie Marie; Natalie Jean; Isaac Williams; Julia Campbell; Victoria C. DePaul
- Cinematography: Adam Ahlbrandt
- Edited by: Adam Ahlbrandt
- Music by: Cleric
- Production companies: Adversary Films; Backseat Conceptions
- Distributed by: Toetag Pictures
- Release date: October 9, 2013 (PollyGrind)
- Running time: 71 minutes
- Country: United States
- Language: English

Cross Bearer is a 2013 slasher film written and directed by Adam Ahlbrandt.

== Plot ==
A fanatically religious homeless man ("Cross Bearer") rants about sinners, and after donning a makeshift mask made of cloths, uses a hammer to kill a drug addict. Elsewhere, Heather, a lesbian stripper, is shown living with her girlfriend Victoria, a controlling and drug-addicted single mother, who she is cheating on with a co-worker named Bunny. Dreaming of running away to Greece together, Heather and Bunny agree to do a drug run for their abusive boss, intent on stealing the money they get for the delivery.

Anton, the pimp who ordered the cocaine, lives on the top floor of an abandoned nightclub, which he brings two prostitutes to. Cross Bearer follows the three up to Anton's room, murders them with his hammer, and takes Anton's gun. Heather, Bunny, Victoria, another stripper named Cindy, and Cindy's boyfriend Mark, an amateur filmmaker and pornographer, arrive and are let in by Cross Bearer. The quintet finds Anton's remains, and are confronted by Cross Bearer, who shoots and beats Mark, and suffocates Cindy to death with a bag of cocaine.

Victoria goes to look for a way out on her own, and is chased to a dead end, where Cross Bearer bludgeons her, and rips her tongue out. Heather and Bunny become separated, and the latter is murdered. Cross Bearer goes after Heather but is distracted by Mark, who shoots him with Anton's gun. After dealing with Mark, Cross Bearer pursues Heather, and the two fight, with Heather emerging victorious, pulling off Cross Bearer's mask, and pummeling him with a baseball bat. While looking for an exit, Heather finds the dying Mark, who gives her Anton's hidden stash of money.

In the morning, Heather goes to her workplace, gives a nihilistic speech, and shoots both her boss and a man who had heckled her the previous day. Heather then goes to a train station with Victoria's baby, while back at the derelict nightclub, Cross Bearer recovers, and stumbles away while muttering, "Oh, loving Lord, guide my hand, so I may purify this Earthly paradise for your great return".

== Cast ==
- Isaac Williams as Cross Bearer
- Natalie Jean as Heather
- J.D. Brown as Harry
- Victoria DePaul as Victoria
- Kacie Marie as Bunny
- Tim Cronin as Mark
- Julia Campbell as Cindy
- Shaun Paul Costello as Anton
- Kelsey Lehman as Roxy
- Dawn Vaughn as Sugar
- Doug Sakmann as Jarvis "Mad Dog" Fleishaker
- Joseph Frantz as Bill

== Reception ==
1nflux Magazine's Rob Rector gave Cross Bearer a B, and opened his review with, "There are many things you can overlook as a film reviewer if you know the people behind the camera have a clue. Such is the case for Cross Bearer, a seedy little indie horror flick that may have several shortcomings, but all which can be overlooked by the fact that you can feel the appreciation of the horror and grindhouse genres the film so skillfully captures". A 4/5 was awarded by Matt Boiselle of Dread Central, who praised the film's gore and killer, and wrote, "Ahlbrandt delivers on all fronts when it comes to not only delivering a storyline that hooks the audience, but providing a varied assortment of characters that we cannot wait to watch act out their most destructive vices". Horror News also responded well to the film, opining that, "Cross Bearer has a lot of violence, sex, and nudity but still done under the microscope of a professional operation that knows how to make use of their budgets" and "At the end of the day, Cross Bearer is a dirty little film that is well shot and well presented. It looks good and keeps the action moving treating us to quite a few stripper moments to keep things lively". Patrick Dolan of Rue Morgue gave the film a positive review, only criticizing the acting and "scatterbrained" structure. In a review for Film Threat, Mike Watt stated, "I wasn't in that much of a hurry to see yet another low-budget slasher film, but Cross Bearer contains enough pitch-black moments that it rises above the majority of the mediocre movies sharing the subgenre that we've all endured over the years. Apart from a few padded sections of gleeful debauchery, Cross Bearer's tone is very bleak and the performances very realistic".
