= August Underground =

2001 American exploitation horror film directed by Fred Vogel

- Two-Disc Snuff Edition
- Directed by: Fred Vogel
- Written by: Fred Vogel; Allen Peters
- Produced by: Fred Vogel
- Starring: Fred Vogel; Allen Peters
- Edited by: Kelly Hutch
- Music by: Kaos FM; Richard J. Donahue
- Production companies: Absu Films; Toetag Pictures
- Distributed by: Toetag Pictures
- Release date: 1 January 2001 (United States)
- Running time: 70 minutes
- Country: United States
- Language: English

August Underground is a 2001 American exploitation horror film directed by Fred Vogel, who co-wrote the screenplay with Allen Peters. The film stars Vogel as a serial killer named Peter who kidnaps and murders several people while his unnamed accomplice, portrayed by Peters, records the crimes.

Presented in an intentionally amateurish found-footage style that mimics a degraded home video, the film was released direct-to-video and has since developed a cult following within extreme horror circles. It was followed by two sequels: "August Underground's Mordum" in 2003 and "August Underground's Penance" in 2007.

== Plot ==
Peter, a psychopathic serial killer, invites his camera-wielding accomplice into his basement, where he is holding a woman named Laura captive. Together, they torture and humiliate her. Later, they pick up a female hitchhiker; after assaulting her, Peter brutally beats her and leaves her by the roadside. After being ejected from a concert, they return home to find that Laura has died.

Peter then murders an elderly woman in her home and, along with his accomplice, terrorizes a convenience store before abandoning a planned kidnapping upon hearing police sirens approaching. The two visit Roadside America and a tattoo parlor. After getting a tattoo, Peter and his accomplice capture the artist and his twin brother, mutilating and killing them.

The pair later hire prostitutes for a drug-fueled encounter. During the ensuing violence, one woman attempts to escape, causing the accomplice to drop the camera, which ends the film.

== Cast ==
- Fred Vogel as Peter
- Allen Peters as Man Behind the Camera
- Kyle Dealman
- Dan Friedman
- Alexa Iris as Hitchhiker
- Victoria Jones as Old Woman
- Aaron LaBonte as Younger Twin
- Ben LaBonte as Older Twin
- Andrew Lauer
- Peter Mountain
- AnnMarie Reveruzzi as Laura (Girl in Cellar)
- Erika Risovich as Erika (Blond Prostitute)
- Russel A. Sagona
- Randi Stubbs as Black Prostitute
- Stephen Vogel as Boy in Supermarket
- John A. Wisniewski as Michael (Dead Man in Bathtub)
- Nick Yatso as Bouncer at Concert

== Production ==
August Underground marked Fred Vogel’s directorial debut; he also co-wrote, produced, and starred in the film. Initially, Vogel had hoped to make a larger-budget zombie film but believed that his lack of feature-film experience would deter potential financiers. Instead, he chose a low-budget project that could demonstrate his abilities and attract attention.

The idea for the film stemmed from Vogel’s frustration with the serial killer genre, which he felt “didn’t show you what was really going on.” Drawing inspiration from John McNaughton's "Henry: Portrait of a Serial Killer," Vogel aimed to create a film that was both “ugly” and realistic while also being unique and original.

Principal photography began in August 2000 under the working title "Peter." The film was shot on a Hi8 camera and later degraded in post-production to enhance the appearance of authentic found footage. The production operated on a very low budget, with friends, family, and local performers filling many roles. Practical effects were handled by Vogel and collaborators connected to Tom Savini's Special Make-Up Effects Program, where Vogel had previously taught.

Vogel initially hoped to conduct a guerrilla marketing campaign for the film, placing VHS tapes in random locations across the United States, such as parks and playgrounds, for passersby to discover. However, this plan was abandoned following the September 11 attacks and subsequent anthrax attacks.

== Release ==
The film was released direct-to-video in the United States on January 1, 2001, by Toetag Pictures. It did not receive a wide theatrical release and circulated primarily through specialty horror distributors and underground channels.

In 2023, Unearthed Films issued a limited collector’s edition Blu-ray/DVD set containing the film, the original screener version, multiple audio commentaries (including one with Vogel), interviews, a feature-length documentary on the production, photo galleries, and trailers.

=== Critical response ===
Gregory S. Burkart of Bloody Disgusting included August Underground on his list "20 Landmarks of Found-Footage Horror!", commenting, "I'm not a big fan of this series, but I admire Vogel's fearless audacity in serving up the ultimate in onscreen sadism." Jay Alan from HorrorNews.net gave the film a positive review, praising its performances, gore effects, and realistic quality. Chris Mayo of Severed Cinema offered similar praise, stating, "August Underground is a true testament of what horror should be; nasty, nihilistic, raw and real." Robert Firsching from AllMovie wrote, "A grueling but important antidote to the plethora of films glamorizing serial killers, August Underground is not likely to find a wide audience, but will not leave those who manage to find a copy unaffected."

The film was later ranked at #14 in Complex's "Most Disturbing Movies of All Time," with the entry noting its realistic quality and "sadistically natural vibe."

Reception has been polarized. Supporters have praised its uncompromising realism, practical effects, and commitment to a non-glamorized portrayal of violence. Critics and many viewers have found the film excessively nihilistic, poorly structured, or simply unpleasant, with little narrative development beyond episodic acts of violence.

=== Controversy ===
In 2005, while traveling to Canada to attend the Rue Morgue Festival of Fear in Toronto, director and co-writer Fred Vogel was arrested pending charges of transporting obscene materials into Canada. Copies of August Underground and its sequel were found by customs officials among the merchandise he had intended to bring to the convention. The charges were eventually dropped after Vogel spent roughly ten hours in customs custody, and his films were sent to Ottawa for further observation.

== In popular culture ==
Ethel Cain's song "August Underground," from the album Preacher's Daughter (2022), is named after the film.
