= Gorelord =

Norwegian death metal band

- Origin: Oslo, Norway
- Genre: Death metal
- Years active: 1999–present
- Members: Frediablo
- Website: www.gorelord.net [Inactive]

Gorelord is a Norwegian death metal band that uses horror themes in its music. It is the one-man side project of Frediablo of the band Necrophagia. Gorelord is based in Oslo, Norway. In September 2005, Frediablo issued a statement saying he was quitting Necrophagia and all projects and bands he was involved in except Grimfist. He was a member of Wurdulak, Hemnur, Soul Forsaken, Ave Sathanas, Blodkrig, Deride and a session member of Svartpest.

== History ==
Gorelord released the album Force Fed on Human Flesh in 2001. Frediablo performed vocals, guitar and bass, whilst Jehmod played drums. Killjoy from Necrophagia and Maniac from Mayhem provided guest vocals on the track "Hells Kitchen".

Gorelord released its second album, Zombie Suicide: Part 666, in 2002. Frediablo performed vocals, guitar and bass. DNA provided drumming. The album included two bonus demo tracks from the first Gorelord demo, House of Unholy Terror.

After a four-year hiatus, Gorelord released Norwegian Chainsaw Massacre in 2006. On Norwegian Chainsaw Massacre, Frediablo played guitar and bass, sang, and programmed the drum machine. Journalist Dom Lawson provided guest vocals on the track "Glorification of violence".

On 7 May 2007, via his MySpace page, Frediablo announced that he had started pre-production on a new Gorelord album, Chapter IV - Hellbound, which would feature Mirai from Sigh on some instrumental tracks. The album would feature 12 tracks, including "Horror vs Hell", "Punctured Skin", "Inside a Madman's Mind" and "Spiked Ignorance". The album was due for release in 2008, but has yet to be released.

A raw, unmixed version of the track "Bloodshot Cadaver Apocalypse" was released on the official Gorelord Myspace on 24 December 2007.

== Discography ==
=== Studio albums ===
- 2001 - Force Fed on Human Flesh
- 2002 - Zombie Suicide: Part 666
- 2006 - Norwegian Chainsaw Massacre

=== Other releases ===
- 1999 - The House of Unholy Terror (demo)
- 2001 - Creature Feature (split EP)
- 2002 - Creature Feature Vol II (split EP)
- 2005 - Drunk, Damned & Decayed (DVD)
