= Killjoy (musician) =

American death metal vocalist (1966–2018)

Background information
- Also known as: Killjoy DeSade
- Born: Frank Anthony Pucci; November 4, 1966; East Liverpool, Ohio, U.S.
- Died: March 18, 2018 (aged 51) East Liverpool, Ohio, U.S.
- Genres: Death metal; thrash metal; black metal
- Occupation: Vocalist
- Years active: 1980s–2018
- Labels: New Renaissance; Red Stream; Season of Mist; Coffin; Restless; Colossal
- Formerly of: Necrophagia; Cabal; Viking Crown; Eibon; The Ravenous
- Children: 3

Killjoy DeSade (born Frank Anthony Pucci; November 4, 1966 – March 18, 2018) was an American musician, best known as the lead vocalist for the death-metal band Necrophagia.

== Career ==
Pucci founded Necrophagia in 1983, which first dissolved in 1990. Shortly after Necrophagia's dissolution, he formed his solo band and released Compelled by Fear in 1990. Pucci reformed Necrophagia in 1997 with Phil Anselmo and performed with the band until his demise. Pucci was the only original member of Necrophagia until the band's end.

He was the vocalist for the death-metal/thrash-metal band Cabal in 1990. Pucci participated in several side projects with Phil Anselmo, including Viking Crown and Eibon. He was the vocalist for the death-metal band The Ravenous, which included Nuclear Assault bassist Dan Lilker and Death drummer Chris Reifert. Pucci also sang for the black-metal band Wurdulak, Forlis and Enoch. He appears in the films August Underground's Mordum, released on video in 2003, and Opening the Mind, released in 2019.

== Personal life ==
Pucci was born in East Liverpool, Ohio, the son of Frank Pucci and Constance "Crabtree" Keller-Orr.

He had two sons and one daughter.

On March 18, 2018, Pucci died from heart failure, in a local hospital in East Liverpool. Necrophagia announced his death via their Facebook page.

== Discography ==
=== Necrophagia ===
Release date	Title	Label
1987	Season of the Dead	New Renaissance
1995	Death Is Fun	Red Stream
1998	Holocausto de la Morte	Red Stream
February 28, 2000	Black Blood Vomitorium (EP)	Red Stream
October 22, 2001	Cannibal Holocaust (EP)	Season of Mist
2001	Reverse Voices of the Dead (split EP with Antaeus)	Season of Mist
February 24, 2003	The Divine Art of Torture	Season of Mist
2004	Goblins Be Thine (EP)	Season of Mist
April 18, 2005	Harvest Ritual Volume I	Coffin / Season of Mist
2006	Slit Wrists and Casket Rot (Live)	Coffin / Season of Mist
2011	Death Trip 69	Coffin / Season of Mist
2014	WhiteWorm Cathedral	Season of Mist

=== Viking Crown ===
Release date	Title	Label
1999	Unorthodox Steps of Ritual (EP)	Baphomet
April 11, 2000	Innocence from Hell	Baphomet
November 13, 2001	Banished Rhythmic Hate	Renegade

=== The Ravenous ===
Release date	Title	Label
August 29, 2000	Assembled in Blasphemy	Hammerheart
2002	Three on a Meathook (EP)	Red Stream
February 24, 2004	Blood Delirium	Red Stream

=== Killjoy ===
Release date	Title	Label
January 1, 1990	Compelled by Fear	Restless / Colossal

=== Wurdulak ===
Release date	Title	Label
October 30, 2001	Ceremony in Flames	Baphomet
2002	Severed Eyes of Possession	Season of Mist

=== Enoch ===
Release date	Title	Label
2004	Graveyard Disturbances	Red Stream/Baphomet

=== Haxxan ===
Release date	Title	Label
December 23, 2016	Loch Ness Rising	Hells Headbangers
