= Intent to Kill (1992 film) =

- Directed by: Charles T. Kanganis
- Written by: David Halver; Charles T. Kanganis; Joseph Merhi
- Starring: Traci Lords; Scott Patterson; Angelo Tiffe; Kevin Benton; Elena Sahagun; Sabrina Ferrand; Michael Foley; Luis Perez; Yaphet Kotto
- Cinematography: Ken Blakey
- Edited by: Geraint Bell; Ron Cabreros; Melisa Sánchez
- Music by: John Gonzalez
- Production company: PM Entertainment Group
- Release dates: October 1, 1992 (Japan); September 15, 1993 (US)
- Running time: 96 minutes
- Country: United States
- Language: English

Intent to Kill is a 1992 action, independent and thriller film directed by Charles T. Kanganis. The film is about drug trafficking, prostitution and police activity. Intent to Kill is rated NC-17 by the United States' Motion Picture Association of America, the reason being extreme violence. This was the first motion picture that received the MPAA NC-17 rating because of violence rather than sexual content.

== Plot ==
Police detective Vickie Stewart goes undercover as a prostitute for a drug operation. Her police sidekick and boyfriend Al searches for drugs along with her. But then the drug operation goes sour, the thugs begin shooting at the police and vehicles begin exploding into flames. Salvador, a drug dealer and member of a ruthless gang named the Colombian Cowboys, gets away, and asks his boss the Mooch for a week to recover the lost drugs which were worth around $50 million.

The following morning at the Los Angeles Police Station, Captain Jackson takes Vickie off the case. Maria, a Hispanic prostitute, tells them that several men had raped her. The police colleagues do not believe her and prevent Maria from filing charges against the rapists. Vickie meets with Maria afterwards and they go to the house of the alleged rapists. Vickie beats up the rapists and confronts the last suspect.

Sal works with a black gang to get a replacement shipment but double crosses them. Meanwhile, Vickie talks with Roberto Melendez, a convict whose brother was killed in the gunfights, and learns there were two dirty police detectives interrogating him as well.

Vickie acts as a young job prospect to Philiy the Pig Jacobs, who is heading up a drug factory; she beats him up and arrests him. Captain scolds her for not garnering any evidence for the arrest, and tells her to take the afternoon off. She goes to the city park; she then returns home, but finds Al cheating on her with a brunette woman he met at a bar. She then takes Al's car from the garage and sets it on fire. Meanwhile, Sal and his gang continue to kill dealers to acquire replacement drugs. Mooch doesn't like that they only recovered half of the drugs, and orders them to get the rest without bothering the other suppliers.

Vickie meets with Maria and her father Nick Gonzalez, and arranges to room with her. She then teaches a self-defense class at the gym, and is wooed by police colleague Tom Martin. As they have dinner, three guys arrive to rob Maria and Nick for protection money, but Vickie shoots two of the thugs and arrests the third.

The next day, as Vickie continues to follow a lead based on Roberto, the police captain and Al agree they should tail Vickie. Al orders Tom to join him. Robert names Sal and his girlfriend Mia as well as the hotel they frequent. When Sal tells Mia about his drug situation, Mia suggests they just attack the police station to recover the drugs, which he then does, killing many officers that night, and then returning to the Mooch to kill him. Vickie returns to the police station that night and finds Tom dead.

Sal takes over the business. Vickie follows Mia to the hotel where she sees Sal's assistant take her and put her in the car trunk. She then follows to Sal's warehouse place where Al, who was responsible for beating up Robert, shows up. When Sal learns that Mia was followed by a cop, he shoots her in the back. More cops arrive and they have a shootout. Sal grabs Vickie hostage and shoots a bunch of cops including Al. Sal escapes in a police car, and Vickie follows in another. They drive until both cars hit the trailer of a semi-truck and flip over. Both Vickie and Sal exit the overturned police cars. In one final showdown, Vickie shoots Sal dead on the street.

== Cast ==
- Traci Lords as Vickie Stewart
- Angelo Tiffe as Salvador
- Scott Patterson as Al
- Louis A. Perez as Pablo
- Sabrina Ferrand as Maria
- Michael Foley as Tom
- Sam Travolta as Sergeant Harris
- Vinnie Curto as Mooch
- Elena Sahagun as Mia
- Kevin Benton as Black Drug Dealer
- Yaphet Kotto as Captain Jackson

== Production ==
Ken Blakey was the motion picture's director of photography. Other people involved with the production of Intent to Kill were Joseph Merhi (the American film producer), Charla Driver, Stephen Lieb, Jean Levine and Richard Pepin. Kanganis and Pepin were also associated with the screenplay of the film.

== Release ==
The film premiered in Japan at the Tokyo International Film Festival on October 1, 1992, and had a physical release on March 13, 1993. The film was released in Germany in April 1993, the Philippines on September 9, 1993, and in the United States on September 15, 1993.

Under the Australian Classification Board when the film Intent to Kill was released onto videotape, the rating officials marked it MA15+, the reason being "Medium level violence, coarse language and drug use"; the decision was made during early-to-mid May 1994. Before being released onto VHS within the United Kingdom, Intent to Kill was trimmed by around sixteen or seventeen seconds before it was assigned with the "18" film rating from British Board of Film Classification officials; the editing was in November 1993. Netherlands (Dutch) film rating system officials had the film marked harmful for audiences age sixteen and under due to its strong profanity, drug abuse and drug trafficking. Under New Zealand Office of Film and Literature Classification, Intent to Kill was assigned with an "M" rating due to violence and offensive language.
