= 100 Tears =

2007 independent slasher film

- Theatrical release poster
- Directed by: Marcus Koch
- Written by: Joe Davison
- Produced by: Joe Davison; Elmar Berger; Alanna Baker
- Starring: Jack Amos; Georgia Chris; Joe Davison; Raine Brown
- Cinematography: Wesley Wing
- Edited by: Marcus Koch
- Music by: Kristian Day
- Production companies: Manic Entertainment; Pop Gun Pictures; Crytzer Enterprises; Starving Kappa Pictures; Upstart Filmworks
- Distributed by: Anthem Pictures
- Release date: June 23, 2007
- Running time: 88 minutes
- Country: United States
- Language: English
- Budget: $75,000

100 Tears is a 2007 American independent black comedy slasher film directed by Marcus Koch and written and co-produced by Joe Davison. It follows the story of a circus clown going on a murderous rampage after being wrongfully accused of rape. The film stars Georgia Chris, Joe Davison (who also produced the film), Jack Amos, and Raine Brown, and was distributed by Anthem Pictures in 2007. The film was generally well received by independent horror film critics and has since garnered a cult following.

== Plot ==
Luther Edward Baxter was an introverted circus clown known by the stage name Gurdy who began dating another circus member named Tracy Greaston. Tracy's friend Roxanne Doogan, whose actual name was Sarah Summers, became jealous that Tracy was not spending as much time with her, and decided to get rid of Luther. She then told the circus' strong man, Ralphio, that Gurdy was raping Tracy. Ralphio then impulsively beat Gurdy senseless, without giving him a chance to explain himself. Shortly after this, Gurdy approaches Roxanne, and strangled her to death. He then finds Ralphio, and stabs him in the back of the head with a bowie knife.

Knowing that he cannot stay inside of the circus after killing two people, a circus dwarf named Drago helps Gurdy evade the circus. Later, a rumor spreads inside of the circus that Gurdy killed himself, although Tracy knows this is not true, as she sees Gury standing around the circus as the travel from town to town. He is now a notorious serial killer known as the Teardrop Killer, whose modus operandi is to follow the circus to whatever town they go to, commit an unspeakably brutal massacre in a random location, and leave a teardrop drawn in blood on the wall at the scene of the crime (hence the title).

In the film's opening scene, he is seen committing one of his brutal massacres at a halfway house, where almost a dozen residents and employees are killed with a giant meat cleaver. He then kidnaps three more to torture, and then, later murder. After this, his killing spree continues when a real estate agent named Michael brings two property buyers to look at a warehouse that Gurdy was using as a temporary hiding spot, where Gurdy kills all three of these men.

As begins to long for his ex-girlfriend Tracy, he goes to the circus, where he extorts Drago into giving him her address. When he goes to visit Tracy, he finds her dead with a girl cleaning up the crime scene. He then humorously chases her around the house, and when he catches her, he kidnaps her and takes her to the warehouse, where he seemingly already has a room awaiting her. When she asks why he hasn't killed her already, he shows her a box that contains old photographs, letters, and notes that reveal that she is his long-lost daughter, Christine Greaston.

Christine seems thrilled that her father is a notorious mass murderer, and insists he shows her the ropes about killing people. This opportunity presents itself when seven teens break into the warehouse to party, and they continue their killing spree, by killing all of them.

However, their reign of terror comes to its conclusion when reporters Mark Webb and Jennifer "Jen" Stevenson arrive at the warehouse with Detectives Dunkin and Spaulding. Consequentially, all four of them become trapped in the warehouse. Detective Dunkin dies next when Christine slits his throat with a straight razor. Next, Christine kidnaps Mark, and dresses him up like Gurdy, who arrives and shoots him in the head. They had planned to make it look like he was the real Teardrop Killer and had killed himself. Jen briefly encounters Gurdy, but escapes, and witnesses him chop Spaulding’s head off. As Jennifer attempts to escape through the exit door, she and Christine briefly wrestle around, which leads to Jen having multiple sledgehammer strikes to her back, and then her face getting smashed into the floor, which supposedly kills her. Christine finds Gurdy walking up a staircase near to where she fought Jen, and she runs over as he flees and shoots at him once with a handgun. The bullet hits Gurdy just behind his ear, killing him instantly and sending his corpse tumbling down the stairs.

She draws a teardrop on the wall, implying that she believes that she is the new Teardrop Killer, and she leaves to the next location, to wreak more havoc. As she crosses the street, she is run over by Jennifer, who is revealed to have survived the massacre.

== Cast ==
- Jack Amos as Gurdy the Clown
  - Clayton Smith as Young Gurdy
- Georgia Chris as Jennifer Stevenson
- Joe Davison as Mark Webb
- Raine Brown as Christine Greaston
- Becca Wheel as Karen
- Pauline Schaffer as Abby
- Jenn Lee as Claire
- Kibwe Dorsey as Detective Spaulding
- Rod Grant as Detective Dunkin
- Norberto Santiago as Drago Villette
- Jerry Allen as Ed Purdy
- Jeff Dylan Graham as Jack Arlo
- Krystal Badia as Jill Bryner
- Leslie Ann Crytzer as Tracy Greaston
- Jori Davison as Roxanna
- Brad Rhodes as Ralphio the Strongman
- Regina Ramirez as Bookstore Patron

== Production and release ==
100 Tears is a low-budget splatter film produced for around $75,000. It was distributed in limited theaters on June 23, 2007. The DVD version of the film was released on December 9, 2008. The film retains its NC-17 rating (for extreme horror violence) by the MPAA.

== Reception ==
Though 100 Tears did not receive much mainstream recognition, it has received mostly positive reviews from independent film critics. The Scars Horror Reviews called the film "a big top blood splattering attraction," and that Jack Amos's performance as Gurdy the Clown "makes Pennywise look as harmless as Bozo the Clown". Johnny Butane of Dread Central gave the film three stars out of five, calling the film "at times genuinely funny, outright ridiculous, painfully bad, and screamingly entertaining." Similarly, Horror Society praised the balance of horror and comedy.

Jay Decay at HorrorNews goes on to say, "Blood, guts and gore [fly] left and right in every scene Gurdy's a part of, and let me tell you, it's extremely entertaining." CultFlicks.net gave the film a 4 out of 10 star review, criticizing the story and lack of nudity for an NC-17 film, but praising the villainous clown character.

== Awards ==
Award	Subject	Nominee	Result
Tabloid Witch Awards	Best Actress	Georgia Chris	Won
Tabloid Witch Awards	Best Supporting Actress	Raine Brown	Won
Tabloid Witch Awards	Best Make-Up Effects	Marcus Koch	Won
