= Season of the Dead =

Studio album by Necrophagia
- Released: February 1987
- Recorded: September–November 1986 at Aircraft Studios in Pittsburgh, Pennsylvania
- Genre: Death metal, thrash metal
- Length: 41:36
- Label: New Renaissance Records

Necrophagia chronology
Season of the Dead (1987)	Death Is Fun (1995)

Professional ratings
Review scores
Source	Rating
Allmusic	2.5/5 stars

Season of the Dead is the debut studio album by the death metal band Necrophagia. It was released in February 1987 by the label New Renaissance Records. It is the only album to feature Joe Blazer on drums, Larry Madison on guitar, and Bill James on bass. It was also the band's last album until 1995, and last studio album until 1998. The album was released a few months before Death's Scream Bloody Gore debut album, which makes it one of the first full-length death metal albums and consequently, valued by collectors.

== Track listing ==
No.	Title	Length
1.	"Season of the Dead/Forbidden Pleasure"	6:05
2.	"Bleeding Torment"	4:50
3.	"Insane for Blood"	3:10
4.	"Reincarnation"	2:20
5.	"Ancient Slumber"	5:15
6.	"Mental Decay"	3:35
7.	"Abomination"	4:31
8.	"Terminal Vision"	4:30
9.	"Painful Discharge"	3:10
10.	"Beyond and Back"	4:10
Total length:		41:36

== Influences ==
- The introduction of "Mental Decay" is the theme from Night on Bald Mountain by Modest Mussorgsky.
- The album's closing track, "Beyond and Back", was apparently inspired by a sequence from the 1978 Sunn Classic Pictures' 'deathsploitation' film Beyond and Back. Like the song, part of the film tells the story of a person who endures a near death experience after committing suicide. The person visits hell, only to be spared to return to the world of the living shortly thereafter.
