= August Underground's Penance =

2007 American horror film written and directed by Fred Vogel

- Snuff Edition DVD released by Toetag Pictures - signed by most of the cast.
- Directed by: Fred Vogel
- Written by: Fred Vogel; Cristie Whiles
- Starring: Fred Vogel; Cristie Whiles
- Edited by: Fred Vogel; Logan Tallman
- Music by: Rue; The Murder Junkies
- Production company: Toetag Pictures
- Distributed by: Toetag Pictures
- Release date: March 30, 2007
- Running time: 84 minutes
- Country: United States
- Language: English
- Budget: $5,000 (estimated)

August Underground's Penance is a 2007 horror film directed by Fred Vogel, who also co-wrote it with Cristie Whiles. It is the sequel to 2003's August Underground's Mordum, and the final installment in the August Underground series, which began in 2001.

== Plot ==
August Underground's Penance continues the series' narrative mode of showing the lives of serial killers (now just Peter, and his girlfriend Crusty) through their camera, though this installment abandons the "degraded footage" aspect employed by the first two films, being shot in high-definition.

After killing a man who breaks free of his restraints and tries to escape them, Peter and Crusty visit various locations in town and enjoy some fireworks at a celebration. Peter is then shown in his basement, taunting a semi-conscious man who has had nails hammered into various parts of his body. Next, Peter and Crusty go on a hike, assault a vagrant they find sleeping under a bridge, and cut a man open so they can pull his gurgling intestines out. The two then attend a party, where Peter does drugs, Crusty flirts with other women, and a live rat is fed to a pet alligator.

Around Christmas, Peter and Crusty break into a family's home. Peter bludgeons the father with a hammer and suffocates the mother, whom he is unsuccessful in trying to rape due to being unable to attain an erection. When the dead couple's young daughter stumbles onto the two intruders, Crusty strangles her. While Peter goes to shower, Crusty opens some of the family's presents, then falls asleep beside the corpses of the little girl and her mother. Later, while watching a band perform, Crusty goes to an empty room with a man, with whom she has rough anal sex. Back in the basement, Peter and Crusty torture and murder several people they have imprisoned. Afterward, they take apart a dead deer, and with a friend's help, feed pieces of it to a lion. The two then enjoy several recreational activities, like shooting on a makeshift firing range, and racing ATVs.

As Peter beats a man to death with a hammer, Crusty drinks some of the spilled blood, then helps Peter dismember a female body. When Peter wakes up from a nap, he and Crusty get into an argument. Peter is then shown cutting the fetus out of a pregnant woman, an act which causes Crusty to break down. When his attempts at comforting Crusty fail, Peter rapes her, then goes into hysterics himself. Peter gets drunk and proceeds to take his frustrations out on a woman in the cellar while screaming insults at Crusty, who is still sobbing hysterically upstairs. When Peter passes out, Crusty throws alcohol and other fluids onto his body, while ranting about how much she hates him.

After beating and tying up a woman, Peter masturbates and smears his semen on her. When Crusty walks in on this, she gets into a physical fight with Peter; he beats her while she screams insults and profanities at him. When Peter falls asleep, Crusty spits on him, and strangles his captive to death. With the woman dead, Crusty breaks down again, and begins begging for forgiveness and rambling about how she "wants out". The film ends with Crusty going to the bathroom and committing suicide via self-asphyxiation.

== Cast ==
- Fred Vogel as Peter Mountain
- Cristie Whiles as Crusty
- Merle Allin as himself
- J. B. Beverley as himself
- Dino Sex as himself

== Reception ==
A four out of five was awarded by Dread Central, which wrote: "I felt uncomfortable, disturbed and a little sick for watching it. I also can't help but feel like I had just watched art. Sick, fucked up art, but art nonetheless" and concluded that by viewing the film "you'll feel dirty, sickened and a little fucked up for watching it, and to me, that's what's great about it". Digital Retribution gave Penance a three out of five, and found that the film was much more professional than its predecessors, and that it is "certainly not for everyone, not even for some who consider themselves lovers of hardcore horror, August Underground's Penance is a hard-hitting, faux-snuff fest. It is also a suitably fitting end to the series with actors Fred Vogel and Cristie Whiles delving into levels of intense paranoia, showcasing a decline in mental and psychical [sic] stability while torturing and butchering nameless individuals. It strives to achieve a point of expressing the mind of a modern serial killer and although this may be lost or unappreciated by those expecting a Mordum 2, it awards the film a credibility that was certainly missing in August Underground's Mordum".

The Worldwide Celluloid Massacre stated that while the leads "have to act in this installment" it was still "the same boring sickness" and "the same pointless realistic snuff trash".
