= Rue Morgue Festival of Fear =

Canadian horror convention

Rue Morgue Festival of Fear (Canadian National Horror Expo)
- Status: Active
- Genre: Multi-genre
- Venue: Metro Toronto Convention Centre
- Locations: Toronto, Ontario
- Country: Canada
- Inaugurated: 2004
- Attendance: 91,000 in 2012
- Organizer: Rue Morgue Magazine/Hobby Star Marketing Inc. joint
- Filing status: Corporate
- Website: http://www.fanexpocanada.com/

Toronto, Canada's Festival of Fear is an annual multigenre fan convention that runs as part of Fan Expo Canada. It was founded as the Canadian National Horror Expo in 2004 by Rue Morgue Magazine and Hobby Star Marketing Inc. It is traditionally a three-day event (Friday through Sunday) typically held the weekend before Labour Day during the summer in Toronto, Canada, at the Metro Toronto Convention Centre. Since 2011 it has become a four-day-long event.

Originally showcasing novels, fantasy, film, television and related popular arts, the convention has expanded over the years to include a larger range of pop culture elements, such as horror, anime, manga, animation, toys, collectible card games, video games and web entertainment. The convention is the largest of its kind in Canada and among the largest in the world, filling the entire south building of the Metro Toronto Convention Centre with over 91,000 attendees in 2012.

Along with panels, seminars, and workshops with industry professionals, there are previews of upcoming feature films, video game companies, and evening events such as The Masquerade; a costume contest, and other social receptions.

Typically there are over 175 hours of programming on all aspects of pop culture over the weekend.

== History, locations and dates ==
Dates	Location	Attendees	Notable guests	Notes
August 27–29, 2004	Metro Toronto Convention Centre	27,684	George A. Romero, Tom Savini, Alejandro Jodorowsky, Doug Bradley, Julie Benz, Mercedes McNab, Brian Azzarello, Jill Thompson	Rue Morgue Festival of Fear joins the Canadian National Expo, later to be renamed Fan Expo Canada as a feature event. Retailer arrested on show floor for selling numerous illegal weapons including throwing stars, nunchaku, one handed crossbows and brass knuckles.
August 26–28, 2005	Metro Toronto Convention Centre	39,753	Elijah Wood, Clive Barker, Gary Gygax, James Marsters, Kevin Sorbo, Crispin Glover, Marina Sirtis, Adam Baldwin, Margot Kidder, Elvira, Jhonen Vasquez.	Attendance reaches facility limit and Toronto Fire Marshall's office halts ticket sales on Saturday afternoon.
September 1–3, 2006	Metro Toronto Convention Centre	42,947	Alice Cooper, Linda Blair, Jeffrey Combs, Karen Black, Rowdy Roddy Piper, Tony Todd, Ken Foree, Gunnar Hansen, Jeff Lieberman, Janet Tracy Keijser, Brian Keene, Athena Demos, Spehera Giron, Nancy Kilpatrick, Mike Mignola, Roman Dirge,	Canadian National Expo re-branded as Fan Expo Canada. The show outgrows the North Building of the MTCC and moves to the much larger South Building.
August 24–26, 2007	Metro Toronto Convention Centre	43,738	David Prowse, Malcolm McDowell, Dario Argento, Adrienne Barbeau, Herschell Gordon Lewis, Angela Bettis, Greg Nicotero, Basil Gogos,	
August 22–24, 2008	Metro Toronto Convention Centre	44,500	Sean Astin, Kristy Swanson, Tobe Hooper, John Saxon, Wes Craven, Sid Haig, Brad Dourif, Ruggero Deodato, Tura Satana, Shawnee Smith, Bruce McDonald, Hugh Dillon,	
August 28–30, 2009	Metro Toronto Convention Centre	59,000	Leonard Nimoy, Bruce Campbell, Linda Hamilton, Thomas Dekker, Mary McDonnell, Emma Caulfield, Leslie Nielsen, Roger Corman, Udo Kier, Barbara Steele, James Duval, Max Brooks, Jack Ketchum, and surprise guest Tobin Bell (unannounced).	Attendance reaches facility limit and Toronto Fire Marshal's office halts ticket sales for two hours on Saturday afternoon.
August 27–29, 2010	Metro Toronto Convention Centre	64,000+	William Shatner, Adam West, Burt Ward, Julie Newmar, James Marsters, Stan Lee, Summer Glau, Michelle Forbes, Dean Stockwell, Daniel Cudmore, Ernest Borgnine, David Cronenberg, Lance Henriksen, Ken Russell, Bill Moseley, William Forsythe, Heather Langenkamp, El Hijo Del Santo, Sherrilyn Kenyon, Anna Silk, Charles Band, Jill Thompson, Yoshitaka Amano, Ed Greenwood, Robin D. Laws, Casts of Todd and the Book of Pure Evil, Riese, Lost Girl, Dark Rising, Medium Raw: Night of the Wolf, I Spit On Your Grave, and Durham County.	Attendance reaches facility limit and Toronto Fire Marshal's office halts ticket sales for four hours on Saturday afternoon.
August 25–28, 2011	Metro Toronto Convention Centre	Over 79,000	Tom Felton, Eliza Dushku, Katee Sackhoff, John Astin, Robert Englund, Lexa Doig, Kevin Sorbo, Michael Biehn, Malcolm McDowell, John Waters, Elvira, Doug Bradley, Danielle Harris, Tom Savini, Heather Brewer, Martin Landau, Lance Henriksen, Anna Silk, Casts of Todd and the Book of Pure Evil, Lost Girl, Dark Rising, Medium Raw: Night of the Wolf, and surprise guest Guillermo del Toro (unannounced).	First year running for 4 days, with Thursday added as the new extra day. Operating hours also expanded for each day.
August 23–26, 2012	Metro Toronto Convention Centre	Over 91,000		

== See also ==
- The Murders in the Rue Morgue
