= Emetophilia =

Sexual arousal from vomiting, being vomited on, or watching others vomit

Emetophilia is a paraphilia in which an individual experiences sexual arousal from vomit or the act of vomiting. The term for being vomited on in a sexual context is called a roman shower, based on the common misconception that the Ancient Romans used vomitoriums to empty their stomachs during feasts.

There have been very few scientific studies about emetophilia. All three people in Robert Stoller's 1982 case study were women with bisexual tendencies, but the sample size is too low to draw any conclusions about the demographics. In 2022, Nabilah A Hasanuddin performed a case study on a woman who was distressed by her emetophilia. Emetophilia can present in a variety of ways, including a desire to touch or ingest another person's vomit or a desire to only observe someone vomit without touching it. One woman in Stoller's study described that she derived pleasure from picturing someone vomiting in a "hard, humiliating fashion" while another likened the feeling of vomiting as similar to an orgasm.

In 2021, when Vulture asked author Melissa Broder about her favorite sensual writing for their essay series "The Best Sex I Ever Read", Broder shared a piece of vomit erotica from Tumblr, explaining why she found it arousing:

Sex is so mysterious, but for me, I’ve narrowed it down. It’s about the total embrace. You’re being forced to be vulnerable; it’s not a choice. Being embraced at your most powerless — at your most vile — that’s where the beauty is. That particular vein of acceptance and embrace is a safety that feels so sexy to me.

== See also ==
- Emetophobia

== Bibliography ==
- Aggrawal, Anil (2009). Forensic and Medico-legal Aspects of Sexual Crimes and Unusual Sexual Practices. Boca Raton: CRC Press. ISBN 978-1-4200-4308-2.
- Stoller, Robert J. (1982). "Erotic Vomiting". Archives of Sexual Behavior. 11 (2): 361–365. doi:10.1007/BF01541597. PMID 7149971. S2CID 35842325.
- Griffiths, Mark; Sutton, Mike (2024). Sexual Perversions and Paraphilias: an A to Z. Curtis Press. ISBN 9781068589706.
- Hasanuddin, Nabilah A.; Effendy, Elmeida (17 March 2022). "A Case Report of Rare Paraphilic Interest: Emetophilia". Open Access Macedonian Journal of Medical Sciences. 10 (T7). Indonesia: 42–44. doi:10.3889/oamjms.2022.9194.
