= Necrophagia =

American death metal band

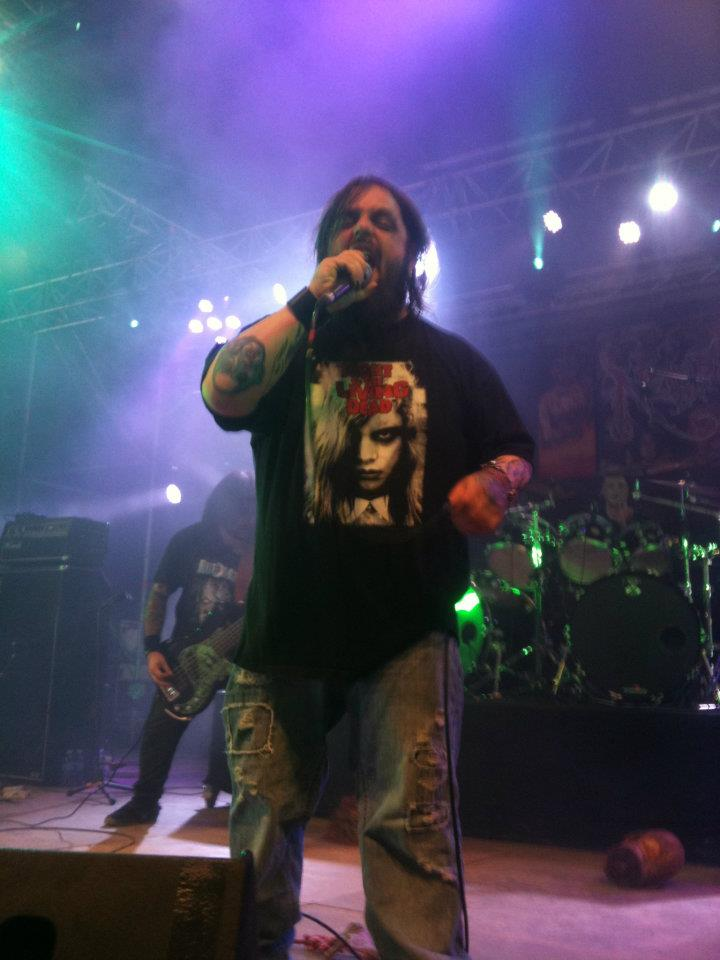
- Necrophagia at Hellfest 2012

Background information
- Origin: Wellsville, Ohio, U.S.
- Genre: Death metal
- Years active: 1983–1987; 1997–2018
- Labels: Red Stream; Season of Mist; New Renaissance
- Past members: Frank Pucci; Larry Maddison; Anton Crowley (Phil Anselmo); Wayne Fabra; Jared Faulk; Steve Lehocky; Dustin Havnen; Mirai Kawashima; Fred Prytz (Frediablo); Knut Prytz (Fug); Opal Enthroned; Undead Torment; Boris Randall; Serge Streltsov; Jake Arnette; Shawn Slusarek; Damien Matthews; Scrimm; Abigail Lee Nero

Necrophagia (/nɛkroʊˈfeɪʒə/ nek-roh-FAY-zhə) was an American death metal band formed in Wellsville, Ohio in 1983. The band is credited as an inaugural death metal group, along with Possessed and Death.

== History ==
=== Early years (1983–1997) ===
Frank "Killjoy" Pucci formed Necrophagia in 1983. The band derives from cannibalism. The word combines the Greek words nekron (corpse) and phagein (to eat). Necrophagia was popular in the underground extreme metal "tape trading" scene. Their first full-length album, Season of the Dead, was recorded and released in 1987. The band split up sometime after the album's release. In 1990, the album Ready for Death (recorded in 1986) was bootlegged by the label Embalming Records and given an official release of 500 on clear green vinyl when New Renaissance reached an agreement with Embalming Records. Ready for Death was later included on the A Legacy of Horror, Gore and Sickness compilation album in 2000.

=== Phil Anselmo era (1997–2001) ===
Pucci befriended Pantera frontman Phil Anselmo shortly after Necrophagia's demise. Anselmo wrote and shared some music with Pucci, who reformed Necrophagia in 1997. Drummer Wayne Fabra and bassist Dustin Havnen joined Pucci and Anselmo, who played guitar under the pseudonym Anton Crowley. Necrophagia released Holocausto de la Morte and the Black Blood Vomitorium EP with the new line-up. Jared Faulk replaced Havnen in 2001. The group enlisted Opal Enthroned, Anselmo's wife, on keyboards. Necrophagia released the Cannibal Holocaust single in 2001, along with their first DVD, Through Eyes of the Dead.

Following the recording of Cannibal Holocaust, the band added second guitarist Fred "Frediablo" Prytz and announced he would start on the next full length release. Prtyz's solo project, Gorelord, had recently been added to Pucci's Baphomet Records label with its debut in October 2001. Shortly after, Anselmo, Opal, and Fabra left the group. The Housecore/Baphomet Records label founded by Pucci and Anselmo dissolved due to scheduling conflicts and previous commitments.

=== Frediablo era (2002–2006) ===
Pucci and Frediablo remained with Necrophagia. In 2002, the band added guitarist Fug (Frediablo's brother), bassist Iscariah (formerly of Immortal), drummer Titta Tanni (of Daemonia/New Goblin fame), and keyboardist Mirai Kawashima (of Japanese avant-garde black metal band Sigh). Necrophagia released The Divine Art of Torture, Harvest Ritual Vol. 1 and the Goblins Be Thine EP with this line-up. Necrophagia released their first live album, Slit Wrists And Casket Rot, recorded during their "Harvesting the Dead" tour.

Frediablo left the band in early 2006 to focus on Gorelord. Undead Torment replaced him.

=== Recent activity ===
Necrophagia released Death Trip 69 in May 2011. The album featured several guest appearances, including Mick Thomson from Slipknot, Casey Chaos from Amen, and former Mayhem vocalist Maniac. WhiteWorm Cathedral was released in October 2014. Necrophagia supported 1349 on their "Chaos Raids North America" tour in May and June 2015.

On March 18, 2018, vocalist and founding member Pucci died at the age of 51.

The band's final studio album, Moribundis Grim, was released on May 10, 2024. It features Pucci's last recordings before his death and contains eight tracks. Moribundis Grim features the final line-up of Necrophagia and has ex-Necrophagia members such as John McEntee from Incantation, Titta Tani (ex Goblin) and Mirai Kawashima from Sigh assisting in its release.

== Members ==
=== Final lineup ===
- Frank "Killjoy" Pucci — vocals (1984–1988, 1997–2018; his death), guitar (1984)
- Shawn Slusarek — drums (2010–2018)
- Serge Streltsov — guitar (2017–2018)
- Jake Arnette — bass (2017–2018)

=== Other members ===
- Jason "Dagon" Moloch — drums (1984–1985)
- Larry "Madthrash" Madison — guitar (1985–1988)
- Joe "Voyeur" Blazer — drums (1985–1988)
- Bill "Bork" James — bass (1986–1988)
- Wayne Fabra — drums (1997–2002)
- Phil Anselmo ("Anton Crowley") — guitar (1997–2002)
- Dustin Havnen — bass (1997–2001)
- Jared Faulk — bass (2001–2002)
- Fred "Frediablo" Prytz — guitar (2001–2005)
- Stephanie Weinstein ("Opal Enthroned") — keyboards (2001–2002, 2008–2010)
- Knut "Fug" Prytz — guitar (2002–2010)
- Stian "Iscariah" Smørholm — bass (2002–2010)
- Mirai Kawashima — keyboards (2002–2008, 2012–2015)
- Giovanni "Titta" Tani — drums (2002–2010)
- Undead Torment — guitar (2006–2012)
- Boris Randall — guitar (2010–2012)
- Damien Matthews — bass (2010–2015)
- Scrimm — guitar (2012–2015)
- Abigail Lee Nero — guitar (2012–2015)
- Steve Lehocky — guitar (2015–2016)
- Kathryn Lesher — bass (2015–2016)

== Discography ==
=== Studio albums ===
- Season of the Dead (1987)
- Ready for Death (1990)
- Holocausto de la Morte (1998)
- The Divine Art of Torture (2003)
- Harvest Ritual Volume I (2005)
- Deathtrip 69 (2011)
- WhiteWorm Cathedral (2014)
- Moribundis Grim (2024)

=== Other releases ===
- Death Is Fun (compilation) (1995)
- Black Blood Vomitorium (EP) (2000)
- A Legacy of Horror, Gore and Sickness (compilation) (2000)
- Cannibal Holocaust (EP) (2001)
- Reverse Voices of the Dead (split EP with Antaeus) (2001)
- Goblins Be Thine (EP) (2004)
- Slit Wrists and Casket Rot (live) (2006)
- Here Lies Necrophagia: 35 Years of Death Metal (compilation) (2019)
