= Film censorship in the United Kingdom =

Film censorship in the United Kingdom began with early cinema exhibition becoming subject to the Disorderly Houses Act 1751. The Cinematograph Act 1909 was primarily concerned with introducing annual licensing of premises where films were shown, particularly because of the fire risk of nitrate film. After the Act began to be used by local authorities to control what was shown, the film industry responded by establishing a British Board of Film Censors (BBFC) in 1912, funded by an Incorporated Association of Kinematograph Manufacturers levy. Acceptance of the BBFC was initially limited: by 1914 only 24 of more than 500 licensing authorities in Britain had adopted it as a central censor. After T. P. O’Connor became president of the Board in 1916, Home Secretary George Cave endorsed the Board and encouraged councils to use their censorship powers.

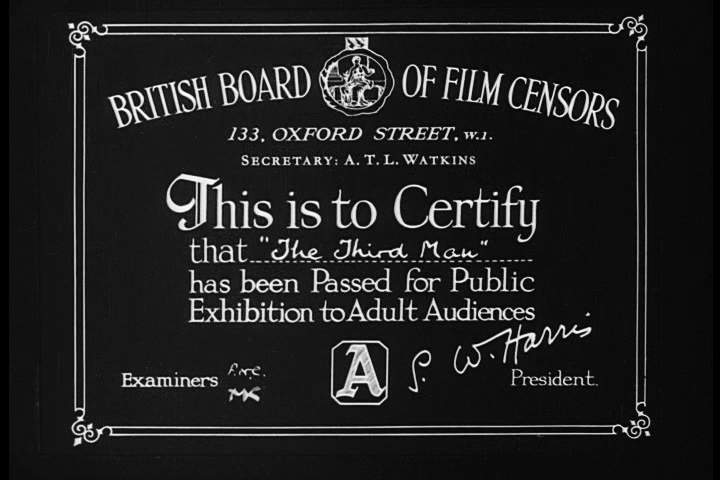
Example of a BBFC certificate

The Cinematograph Exhibitors Association sought to have the BBFC film certification recognized over local decision-making. The case of Mills v London County Council in 1925 (1 KB 213) established that a Council could make its licensing conditional on the exhibitor complying with the BBFC certification. In 1929 the Home Office advised local licensing authorities to adopt the BBFC's certificates and to bar under-16s from "A" films unless accompanied by an adult. In 1931 the Home Office set up a Film Censorship Consultative Committee to keep the BBFC in touch with interested groups, instead of holding the public inquiry that some campaigners had demanded. Local Councils did continue to refuse showing of particular films which had been certificated by the BBFC: examples are the bans on The Devils and Life of Brian in Glasgow. A compulsory "H" (horrific) certificate for films thought likely to frighten children was introduced in 1937, but it was rarely used and was withdrawn in 1951.

Currently, Section 4 of the Video Recordings Act 2010 (previously the act of 1984) requires that videos for sale in the UK should be certified by an authority. The BBFC (by this time renamed as British Board of Film Classification) became that designated authority in 1985. Videos that were already on sale had until 1 September 1988 to receive a rating. In 1994 the Act was amended by the Criminal Justice and Public Order Act 1994, which required the BBFC to take into account the potential for harm when rating videos, with particular attention to depictions of criminal behaviour, illegal drugs, violence, horror and human sexual activity. The film censorship that exists in the UK today is in the form of an Age-Rating system, which is an advisory tool used by local councils when deciding to grant viewing permission to film productions.

== List of banned films ==
| Date banned | Title | Explanation |
|---|---|---|
| 1913–1914 | £1,000 Reward | Produced by the Anchor Film Company in 1913, starring and directed by Harold Heath. It was filmed in quarries on the Isle of Portland, Dorset, and depicted an escape from the nearby Convict Prison. The Home Office ruled that the film must not be shown publicly, presumably believing it would give real prisoners ideas. |
| 1918–1996 | The Life Story of David Lloyd George | This biopic was abandoned in post-production, and the unedited rolls of original camera negative were shelved until their accidental rediscovery in 1994, which led to the film being restored by, in effect, editing the film as it would have been had the production process not been interrupted. It is believed that the rapid decline in Lloyd George's popularity during the shooting period led to fears that the film would meet a hostile reception if released, and that as a result, the leadership of the Liberal Party engineered its suppression. |
| 1925–1929 | The Phantom of the Opera | Banned because it was too horrifying for general distribution. |
| 1926–1954 | Battleship Potemkin | Banned because of "inflammatory subtitles and Bolshevist Propaganda". The film was exhibited in private showings and in certain localities. Unbanned after the death of Joseph Stalin. |
| 1931 | The Miracle Woman | Briefly banned because of its attack on Christian hypocrisy. |
| 1932–1963 | Freaks | Rejected by British censors and banned due to disturbing content and again in 1952 for a cinema rating certificate. Available from 1963 - passed with an X rating. |
| 1932–1958 | Island of Lost Souls | Submitted to and refused a certificate by the British Board of Film Censors in 1933, 1951, and 1957, primarily due to concerns over the horrific scenes of vivisection and being against the natural order of things, combined with sexual and racial themes. It is likely that the 1951 and 1957 refusals were informed by concern that distribution of the film would constitute an offence under the Cinematograph Films (Animals) Act 1937. The film's ban in the UK was lifted in 1958, in the 1958 re-release, the censors cut the entirety of Laughton's death scene. The uncut version of the film was finally re-released in 2012. |
| 1933 | Hey, Pop! | This Warner Bros. short was not granted an exhibition certificate from the BBFC because of the 1921 scandal surrounding star Roscoe Arbuckle in relation to the death of actress Virginia Rappe. |
| 1933 | The Mad Doctor | This Mickey Mouse short was banned on its initial release because of its horror atmosphere. |
| 1934 | Red Hot Mamma | On its initial release this Betty Boop animated short was banned for depicting Hell in a humoristic manner, which was deemed blasphemous. |
| 1953–present | I Vinti | Refused a certificate by the British Board of Film Censors in 1954, and never subsequently resubmitted for theatrical or home release since. |
| 1954–1967 | The Wild One | Banned from distribution in the United Kingdom until 1967 as the censors felt the film encouraged criminal activity and antisocial behavior. |
| 1958–1995 | Glen or Glenda | This Ed Wood film was rejected/banned from distribution in the United Kingdom due to its trans-related subject matter. In 1981, it was distributed and reviewed in the Monthly Film Bulletin under the title "I Had Two Lives", and in 1995, it was released on VHS uncut with a 15 rating. |
| 1960–1968 | Black Sunday | Mario Bava's film was initially banned in the United Kingdom due to its violent content such as bloody scenes featuring a wooden stake being rammed into a vampire's eyeball and a metal mask hammered into a beautiful woman's face. Released in 1968 with cuts to most of the scenes of violence and the film was not released uncut in the United Kingdom until 1992. |
| 1963–1990 | Shock Corridor | This Samuel Fuller film was initially banned on multiple counts but mainly because the film "presents a mental hospital in a light that would be considered objectionable in this country", which BBFC secretary John Trevelyan felt was offensive to "people who have friends and relatives with mental illness". The BBFC subsequently received a letter from the distributors who objected the film's ban and tried to make 'minor deletions' to the film in order to make it acceptable, but the film was still rejected. Subsequent attempts to release the film were rejected in 1966 and 1968, but the Greater London Council passed the film with an X certificate in 1969. The film was later passed at an uncut 15 certificate on home video in 1990. |
| 1964–present | 491 | This controversial drama was banned for a 1964 release. |
| 1964–1990 | The Naked Kiss | This Samuel Fuller crime film was initially banned, but was later given an uncut release for a 1990 home video release, with an 18 certificate. |
| 1965–1968 | Onibaba | Originally banned in 1965, but a cut version was allowed with an X certificate in 1968. All versions have been released uncut since the 1994 VHS release. |
| 1966–1972 | The Wild Angels | This Peter Fonda motorbike film was banned in 1966, but was cut for a 1972 cinema release. Later uncut for VHS version and onward. |
| 1968–2002 | The Trip | Roger Corman's film was banned due to the overall film condoning and glamorizing the use of LSD. The film was rejected by the BBFC four times between 1968 and 1988. It was not released in Britain until 2002. |
| 1969–2011 | Untitled Ken Loach Save the Children Fund film | In 1969, Ken Loach was commissioned by the Save the Children Fund charity to make an hour-long documentary promoting its work. Upon viewing the rough cut, the charity's executives refused to sanction the film's distribution or broadcast in the belief that it was a negative portrayal of their organisation. The dispute resulted in a court ruling to the effect that the film's master elements be preserved in the National Film and Television Archive, but that no access be allowed without Save the Children's permission. Following negotiations between the British Film Institute and Save the Children, the first public screening of the film took place at London's National Film Theatre in August 2011. Though never formally titled, the film is cataloged in the BFI's records as The Save the Children Fund Film. |
| 1969–2007 | 99 Women | Banned originally in 1969 under the title Ninety Nine Women. Passed in 2007 with a minute cut due to animal cruelty. |
| 1969–1993 | Django | Denied classification and banned outright due to concerns over "the excessive and nauseating violence in the film & the moral tone", and was rejected after the distributor refused to make cuts. It did not receive classification in the UK until it was submitted for an official video release by Arthouse Productions in 1993, when the BBFC concluded it could be passed, without cuts, with an 18 certificate. The film was examined by the BBFC for a fourth time in 2004, when Argent Films submitted the film prior to its British DVD release. The film was downgraded to a 15 certificate for "moderate bloody violence". The BBFC have acknowledged that the original 18 certificate was partially reactionary to the film's censorship history. |
| 1970–1971 | Bloody Mama | Initially banned in 1970, a cut version was passed in 1971 for general cinema release, and was passed uncut in 2009. |
| 1971–1972 | Trash | This Paul Morrissey film was banned because of its drugs theme, and the potential harm it could have (mainly the encouragement of drug use among young people) because of it. A censored version was later passed in 1972, which the distributor claimed was "cinematic history down the drain", but then ironically cut more material out of the film for the film's release, on the ground that the censored material was "either boring or possibly distasteful". Both BBFC and distributor cuts added to a total of 11 minutes. These cuts were mostly waived for future releases, and the film was finally released uncut in 2005. |
| 1971–2002 | Straw Dogs | Originally rated X for the cinema with cuts in 1971, there was no immediate attempt to apply for a home video certificate following the passing of the Video Recordings Act 1984 due to scenes of sexual violence being "positively" depicted. Two attempts of distributing the edited American version of the film were both rejected by the BBFC in 1999. The MPAA-mandated cuts reduced the length of the rape scene, and the second rape that was removed for US release. This version ended up eroticizing the first rape scene, and with the new guidelines the BBFC had at that point, the US cut of the film was deemed unacceptable. The uncut version of the film was finally re-released in 2002. |
| 1971–1974 | The Panic in Needle Park | The film was banned in June 1971 by the BBFC, before being released with an 'X' rating in November 1974. A cut version, short of 57 seconds, was passed with an '18' rating on New Year's Eve 1987 for video release. In April 2002, however, a version of the film was passed with an '18' rating by the BBFC, and all its previous cuts were waived. Explicit detail of injecting drug use is no longer considered grounds to cut or ban a film, but does require restriction to the '18' category unless there is an aversive, anti-drugs message. Nonfiction material which explicitly advocates use or cultivation of substances controlled under UK law- such as in four documentary/instructional videos on cannabis and psilocybin-containing 'magic' mushrooms submitted in 2005- may still be banned. |
| 1972–2000 | Deep Throat | This film, one of the first story-based pornographic films, was originally banned upon its release because many individuals at the BBFC saw it as obscene. Ten years later, in 1982, the courts upheld the ban of the film on grounds of obscenity. The uncut DVD was finally given an R18 rating in 2000, which allowed it to be sold in licensed sex shops in the UK. A cut version has been sanctioned for a similar 18 certificate and a wider release. |
| 1972–2002 | The Last House on the Left | "Was refused a certificate for cinema release by the British Board of Film Censors in 1974, due to scenes of explicit and sadistic sexual violence and humiliation. It was released on home video in 1982, during the early 1980s home video boom, the film was released uncut (save for an incidental, gore-free scene with the comic relief cops, and the end credit roll) as a video that did not fall under the BBFC's remit at the time. This changed when the "video nasty" scare which started in 1982 led to the Video Recordings Act 1984. The film landed on the Department of Public Prosecutions list of "video nasties", and was banned. The film remained banned throughout the remainder of the 1980s and into the 1990s. The film was again presented to the BBFC for theatrical certification and it was again refused. The film was eventually given an "18" certificate, in 2002 it was released with 31 seconds of cuts, and was released in the UK on DVD in 2003. The BBFC finally classified the uncut film for an "18" DVD release in 2008." |
| 1973–1999 | A Clockwork Orange | Not banned per se, but withdrawn in the United Kingdom two years after its release by Warner Bros. following a request for this action from its own director, Stanley Kubrick. This was not because of the alleged copycat violence inspired by the film contemporaneously reported by the media, as commonly believed, but because Kubrick had received death threats against his family. It was not allowed to be shown again in the UK until after his death in 1999 and before the release of Eyes Wide Shut, his last film. |
| 1973–1974 | Coffy | Initially banned by the BBFC for 1973 cinema release, but then resubmitted and released in a cut from in 1974. Passed 18 uncut in 1988. |
| 1974–1999 | The Texas Chain Saw Massacre | After its initial British release, including a one-year theatrical run in London, The Texas Chain Saw Massacre was initially banned on the advice of British Board of Film Classification (BBFC) Secretary Stephen Murphy, and subsequently by his successor, James Ferman. Due to the perceived degree of terrorisation of women and threat to defenceless women, three men are killed in quick fashion, but one woman is brutally slaughtered-hung on a meat hook and the surviving woman endures physical and mental torture. While the British ban was in force, the word "chainsaw" itself was barred from movie titles, forcing imitators to rename their films. In 1998, despite the BBFC ban, Camden London Borough Council granted the film a licence. The following year the BBFC passed The Texas Chain Saw Massacre for release with an 18 certificate (indicating that it should not be seen or purchased by a person under 18), and it was broadcast a year later on Channel 4. |
| 1974–2012 | Score | Initially banned in 1974, the film was later passed in a censored form (removing one scene of unsimulated sexual activity) for a 2012 home video release. |
| 1975–1986 | The Dirty Mind of Young Sally | Banned by the BBFC for 1975 cinema release. A very short version was further cut by the BBFC for 1986 VHS. |
| 1975–2000 | Salò, or the 120 Days of Sodom | Pier Paolo Pasolini's art film, based on The 120 Days of Sodom by the Marquis de Sade, was initially rejected, but was passed with an 18 certificate in 2000. |
| 1975–2003 | Deep River Savages | Umberto Lenzi's cannibal film was originally banned and listed as a "video nasty", but eventually passed with animal cruelty cuts in 2003. |
| 1975–present | Sweet Movie | Was banned due to unpleasant scenes involving lavatorial practices; explicit sex and nudity; footage of an adult stripping in close proximity to young children, which was considered distasteful in 1975 and thought potentially unlawful on its 1980 re-submission following enactment of the Protection of Children Act 1978; and general concerns that the film may cause offence and controversy in the country. Has not been re-submitted since, but has occasionally been shown at arthouse cinemas in large UK cities, presumably with approval from the local authority for viewing by adult patrons. |
| 1976–1981 | Maîtresse | Refused a British certificate because of its depiction of sadomasochism; an examiner's report said that "the actual scenes of fetishism are miles in excess of anything we have ever passed in this field". Released with an X certificate in 1981, with several minutes of cuts. Passed uncut with an 18 certificate for DVD release in 2003. |
| 1978 | Confessions of a Blue Movie Star | Banned in 1978, but later passed with cuts. |
| 1978–2001 | I Spit on Your Grave | It was initially banned for high levels of extreme graphic violence, particularly the lengthy depictions of gang rape, that take up 30 minutes of its runtime. However, since films on video did not need censor's certificates at the time, it was released on home video, where it was branded a "video nasty" by the press. It appeared on the Director of Public Prosecutions' list of prosecutable films until 2001 when a heavily cut version that edited the rape scenes was released with an 18 certificate. The cuts were reduced considerably from 7 minutes 2 seconds in the 2001 release to 2 minutes 54 seconds in the 2011 release so that only the scenes of rape that focus on Camille Keaton's nudity have been banned since the 2011 release. It was again submitted for UK DVD in 2020, and was passed with lesser cuts, this time totalling 1 minute 41 seconds. |
| 1980–1993 | Derek and Clive Get the Horn | This Peter Cook and Dudley Moore comedy was banned in 1980 due to the supposed abusive overuse of swear words. Was later passed uncut with an 18 certificate for a 1993 video release. |
| 1980–2010 | Bare Behind Bars | A Brazilian women in prison sexploitation film was classified as an 18 after the distributors removed 1m 38s of explicit scenes of unsimulated sex acts (such as fellatio and vaginal penetration by penis and dildo). The BBFC were prepared to grant an R18, which would have allowed it to be sold in licensed sex shops. |
| 1980–2015 | Mother's Day | Banned by the BBFC for 1980 released during the "video nasty" period. |
| 1981–2002 | The House on the Edge of the Park | Banned for a cinema release in 1981. Initially granted an 18 certificate in 2002, albeit one with substantial cuts totaling 11 minutes and 48 seconds. In 2011, the film was reclassified by the BBFC, and most cuts were waived. However, it is still censored with 43 seconds of cuts to sexual violence, particularly the scenes in which a razor is traced over a woman's naked body, after which her body is cut with the razor. |
| 1981–2002 | Maniac | Refused a certificate twice by the BBFC, first for a cinema release in 1981, and then for a video certificate in 1998, on the grounds of unacceptable levels of sexualized violence. But later passed with an 18 certificate in 2002 with 58 seconds of cuts to such violence, including a prolonged strangulation scene and to a sexualized stabbing sequence, in 2002. Passed uncut by the BBFC for 2022. |
| 1981–1991 | Possession | After an initial limited theatre release in the United Kingdom, the film was banned by the BBFC due to its graphic depictions of miscarriage, domestic abuse, self-harm, sexual violence and child neglect. As one of the notorious "video nasties". On American screens, it came out in a heavily edited 81-minute cut version from Limelight International Films on October 30, 1983, having lost more than a third of its runtime; the distributor turned the film into an eccentric body horror, almost eliminating the main theme of the painful breakdown of marriage. This version was ridiculed by the American press as an example of "a cheap Grand Guignol" and had no public success. A cut version was released with an 18 certificate in 1991, and passed uncut in 1999. |
| 1982–2002 | The New York Ripper | Originally banned due to a high level of sexual violence against women. Although it was finally released 20 years later, the film remains censored, as a breast slashing scene remains unacceptable to BBFC guidelines. |
| 1982–present | Love Camp 7 | Made in 1969, it was one of the first Nazi exploitation features ever made. The film went on to be one of the 39 prosecuted "Video Nasties" during the early 1980s. The film was entered for classification in 2002 and was rejected as "the whole purpose of the work is to invite male viewers to relish the spectacle of naked women being humiliated for their titillation". |
| 1983–1990 | The Evil Dead | The Evil Dead was trimmed by 49 seconds including an ankle stabbing, Theresa Tilly's character chewing off her own hand, an eye gouging, a body being dismembered, body blows with a poker and a wooden post, and shots of blood spurts, before it was granted an X certificate for cinema release. This censored version was also released on home video; at the time there was no requirement that films had to be classified for home video release. A campaign by pro-censorship organization NVLA led to the film being one of the first films deemed a 'Video nasty' - the term for films criticized for their violent content by the press, commentators, police and Trading Standards authorities, some religious leaders and 'pro-family' activists such as Mary Whitehouse. Despite eventually being removed from the DPP list of Video Nasties, the film was still postponed being released until 1990, that the film surfaced on video in the UK again, due to wrangles between the distributors and the BBFC over how much footage should be cut from a legal video release. In the end, a further 1 minute and 6 seconds was removed, in addition to the previous theatrical version cuts. Most of the scenes depicting excessive gore were shortened or removed, the sequence of Ellen Sandweiss' character being sexually assaulted by a demonically possessed tree being particularly targeted for cuts. The fully uncut version was finally released on DVD in 2001. |
| 1983–1992 | Shogun Assassin | Banned for 9 years due to extreme violence. |
| 1984–2003 | Faces of Death | The film was banned for explicit gore and juxtaposing fictional deaths and real footage of accidents, but was passed with only animal cruelty cuts in 2003. |
| 1984–2002 | Zombie Creeping Flesh | Swept up in the Video Nasties controversy and withdrawn. An attempt to resubmit the film for classification was stonewalled by the James Bulger murder case, though it was passed uncut with an 18 rating several years later. |
| 1984–1991 | Savage Streets | The film was rejected in 1984. In 1987 passed 18 with cuts in 1m 4s, but then rejected again until 1991. In 2011 passed 18 without cuts. |
| 1984–2001 | Cannibal Holocaust | As well as being labelled as a 'Video Nasty', it was originally believed to be a snuff film. The director Ruggero Deodato was arrested for obscenity charges and was forced to prove that nobody had died during production. Despite finally being officially released in 2001, the film received 5 minutes and 44 seconds worth of cuts. In 2011, the film was re-released and all but 15 seconds of cuts- a muskrat being killed with emphasis on blood and pain- have been restored. |
| 1986–1999 | The Exorcist | The theatrical version was passed, uncut, with an X rating, by the BBFC in 1974 and has always been able to be screened legally. The original home video of the film was released in 1979 and was not banned per se, but Warner decided not to submit the film for classification for a few years following the video nasties controversy (as they believed there was a high probability of an official ban) and the implementation of the Video Recordings Act 1984 in 1986. Adding to the BBFC's difficulties were reports of incidents of hysteria involving young women, which had led to concerns that the film might cause severe emotional problems, particularly among those who believed in reality of demonic possession. It was not until 1999 that the video was finally submitted and passed, uncut, with an 18 rating. |
| 1987–2020 | Silent Night, Deadly Night Part 2 | The BBFC rejected a UK video release in 1987 after the distributor refused to edit a double murder scene and shots of topless women being killed. Following a re-submission, the film was passed uncut in 2020. |
| 1987–2000 | Death Wish | Despite being initially passed uncut with an X certificate, the film suffered censorship problems after the implementation of the Video Recordings Act 1984. Before this, the film was available on video uncut without a video classification, relying on its cinema certificate for a rating. After this, it became compulsory for all videos to have a rating, leading to Death Wish being submitted for a video certificate in 1987. James Ferman wanted to cut the controversial rape scene, but was concerned that such intervention would ruin a crucial part of the film. As such, the film was withdrawn rather than outright banned. It was later passed with minimal cuts in 2000 to the rape scene and all previous censorship was waived in 2006. |
| 1988–2024 | Slumber Party Massacre II | Banned by the BBFC for VHS release after extensive cuts was refused. An uncut version was passed 15 on 5 July 2024. |
| 1989–2012 | Visions of Ecstasy | Banned under the common law offence of blasphemy which was abolished in 2008, it is the only film ever to be banned in the UK due to blasphemy. Following a re-submission in 2011, it was passed uncut with an 18 certificate. |
| 1990–2004 | Leatherface: The Texas Chainsaw Massacre III | Banned due to graphic violence, which is particularly focused against women; passed uncut in 2004. |
| 1990 | International Guerillas | This Pakistani comedy was refused a certificate as it characterised author Salman Rushdie as a sadistic criminal mastermind, working for an international conspiracy devoted to destroying Islam. As Rushdie's book The Satanic Verses had caused uproar and led to a fatwa being issued against him in 1988 by Supreme Leader of Iran Ayatollah Khomeini, the BBFC banned the film on the grounds that his portrayal in the film could inflame some to violence and that they were concerned over the author's safety. However, Rushdie himself objected to the ban, feeling that "censorship is usually counter-productive and can actually exacerbate the risks it seeks to produce". The rejection was subsequently overturned following the film's appeal to the Video Appeals Committee, with the film being granted an 18 certificate. Pirated copies of the film were shown in some Muslim communities in the interim between the issuing and lifting of the ban. |
| 1992–1995 | Reservoir Dogs | The film was submitted to the BBFC for a theatrical release in 1992, the scenes of violence, combined with bloody injury (notably Tim Roth's badly wounded Mr. Orange), made the classification of the film at 18 almost a formality. But even at that category the notorious sequence in which Michael Madsen's Mr. Blonde tortures a policeman by slicing off his ear, dousing him with petrol and threatening to set him on fire, was considered troubling in terms of its acceptability and was the subject of considerable debate within the BBFC. Views were expressed that its gruesome and sadistic nature would cause some people to walk out of the film. It was also noted that Mr. Blonde's evident enjoyment of what he was doing ("It amuses me to torture a cop") as he dances around the helpless victim to the strains of "Stuck in the Middle with You" coming from the radio, glamorized the sadism. however, the general opinion was that scene, whilst generating a sustained, intense and disquieting atmosphere of threat and menace, was remarkably restrained in what it actually showed. Consequently, the film was passed 18, without cuts and widely shown in cinemas). The work was next submitted in 1993 for its home video classification, though the film was never formally refused a video certificate, one was not actually granted until 1995. Because of the BBFC's statutory powers under the Video Recordings Act 1984, the delay amounted to a de facto ban during this period, during which a second theatrical release took place in 1994. It has been alleged that the delay was due to political pressure applied to then-BBFC's director, James Ferman, resulting at least in part from the revived controversy over so-called video nasties that was precipitated by the murder of James Bulger in 1993. The film was finally granted an uncut 18 certificate in 1995 a considerable time after its video release in all the other major international markets, which did not prove too disconcerting for Quentin Tarantino who was reported to be delighted that the delay had given the film an extended theatrical life in the UK. |
| 1993–1994 | The Good Son | The murder of James Bulger was given as a reason for withdrawing this film. When it was released on video in 1995, it was given an 18 certificate, with edits made to the sequence in which Macaulay Culkin's character drops a dummy over a bridge into oncoming traffic and causes a multiple car pile-up, out of fear that children would try to imitate the stunt. The 2002 DVD has been passed uncut with an 18 certificate. |
| 1994 | Natural Born Killers | Oliver Stone's violent satire on the media was first submitted to the British Board of Film Classification in 1994, against the backdrop of the controversy over the media effects that had built up in the wake of the murder of James Bulger in 1993. The version submitted to the BBFC had already been subjected to over three minutes of cuts by the MPAA (the American classification body) to obtain a more commercial R rating. Certification was delayed while the BBFC investigated claims that the film incited violence upon release in the U.S. The BBFC later gave the film an 18 certificate. The VHS release, also rated 18, was banned by Warner Bros. until 2001. This was in response to the Dunblane massacre, which occurred shortly after it passed uncut. In 2002 the full 'Director's Cut' version of the film, restoring the three minutes of cuts required in the U.S. in 1994, was submitted to the BBFC and classified uncut at 18, citing strong bloody violence and sexual violence. |
| 1994 | Back in Action | This Roddy Piper action film was originally banned because its extremely violent content could be harmful, as they felt that it was likely to appeal to minors, particularly those with a record of violent offending. The rejection was overturned after a heavily pre-cut version was further censored to remove the more brutal parts of the film (including kicks to the head and face, the smashing of heads against walls, floors, and pillars, and the biting of ears) and glamorizing of weaponry. All cuts were waived when the film was resubmitted in 2004. |
| 1994–2004 | Kickboxer 4: The Aggressor | Rejected a video certificate in 1994, because it was 'celebration of extreme violence as entertainment'. Passed uncut for a DVD release in 2004. |
| 1995–2001 | Boy Meets Girl | Despite being allowed an uncut 18 rating on its initial cinema release, the film was refused a home video certificate, due to its strong emphasis on torture. Given an uncut 18 certificate in 2001 for DVD release. |
| 1996–2025 | Mikey | Rejected by the BBFC for a certificate in 1996; a trailer had been classified 18 four years before. In the aftermath of the widely publicised murder of James Bulger, the BBFC (on the guidance of three child psychiatrists) banned the film because it features a child as a killer (which they believed might cause children who watched it to act violently). The murder also delayed the re-release of Hell of the Living Dead for several years (see above). As of March 2025, the film released under a 15 certificate. |
| 1996–present | Bare Fist: The Sport That Wouldn't Die | This documentary about bare-knuckle fighting was refused a certificate twice. In both cases, the board was concerned with how the documentary allegedly glamorised the sport, through its lengthy sequences of the fighting as well as the instructional use of achieving lethal effects, like lacing bandaged fists with glass fragments. While they didn't object to what the documentary was wanting to achieve, which was trying to legalise the sport, the content mentioned was still a concern. After the director refused to make the board's cuts, the film was initially banned in 1996. A later re-submission in 1999 was similarly unsuccessful. |
| 1997–present | Brave, Bashed, Battered and Bruised | This documentary about karate was banned because the board felt that the film was 'selling the pleasures of gross violence through its unrelenting focus on the infliction of injury and pain.' |
| 1997–present | Date with a Mistress | The BBFC banned this film because of 'pornographic treatment of sex in the context of force, restraint and the infliction of pain'. |
| 1998–2018 | Deadbeat at Dawn | Despite the fact that cuts were suggested on first submission to the use of martial arts weaponry, the Board were split over the film due to its high levels of violence. It was eventually rejected, with high level examiners (including Andreas Whittam Smith) taking objection to its content. |
| 1998–present | Changing Room Exposed | This film was refused a video certificate in 1998, as its content (consisting of footage from a men's changing room without the participants' knowledge) violated Article 8 of the European Convention of Human Rights which guarantees the right to privacy. The distributors later went to the Video Appeals Committee in order to overturn the decision, but withdrew from the process later on. In 2001, it was re-submitted under the title Video Voyeur under the pretense that the participants knew they were filmed. When the board didn't receive any concrete evidence for this, the film was rejected again in 2003. |
| 1999–present | Banned from Television | Banned as the board felt that this film's constant display of real death, injury and mutilation for entertainment was unacceptable. This was because they argued that it could desensitize people and erode their compassion towards the suffering of others, something worsened by how it could potentially get into the hands of minors. |
| 1999–2003 | Cat in the Brain | Banned due to the extreme violence, depravity and unacceptable amount of sexual violence. Passed uncut in 2003. |
| 2002–present | Hooligans | This video documentary was refused a video certificate, as it glorified football hooliganism. |
| 2003–present | Bumfights | The first volume of Bumfights was banned as the film's content violated the Video Recordings Act 1984 as it exploited 'the physical and other vulnerabilities of homeless people', since they were constantly being 'abused, assaulted, and humiliated' in the video according to the board. |
| 2003–present | Spy of Darkness | This anime was banned due to unacceptable levels of eroticised sexual violence, something worsened by how some of the victims seemed to enjoy being raped. The other three 'hentai' videos in the Darkness series were passed 18 with extensive cuts, some compulsory (to remove the kind of eroticised sexual violence which dominates Spy of Darkness) and others to graphic animations of consensual sex featuring penetration, ejaculation and semen to avoid the R18 category which would have prevented them from being legally sold outside of sex shops. |
| 2004–present | Women in Cellblock 9 | The film was rejected over sexual violence being eroticized and images of Susan Hemingway, who was 16 at the time of filming, which were considered potentially indecent (in England and Wales, indecent images of minors are illegal; the relevant age was raised from 16 to 18 by the Sexual Offences Act 2003, which had been passed by Parliament to take effect on May 1, 2004, shortly after this submission to the BBFC). |
| 2005–present | Traces of Death | A Mondo film featuring real images of death and suffering that were deemed to have "no journalistic, educational or other justifying context" and liable to deprave and corrupt the audience (thus contravening the Obscene Publications Act) in their presentation as mere entertainment. |
| 2005–present | Terrorists, Killers and Other Wackos | Banned as it presented clips of actual injury and death with "no journalistic, educational or other justifying context for the images shown" as well as how the "undercurrent of racism and xenophobia" could potentially lead to viewers becoming more racist. |
| 2006–present | Struggle in Bondage | This film is rejected by the BBFC that depicts women were bound and gagged, writhing and struggling against their restraints. |
| 2008–present | Murder-Set-Pieces | The film was submitted for release in the United Kingdom to the BBFC who refused to classify it on video/DVD in 2008. The BBFC stated they rejected the film because of sexual violence, sustained sadistic terror, humiliation and the focus on the graphic killing of a pre-teen child which together raised a potential harm risk and potentially breached obscenity laws. |
| 2008–present | The Texas Vibrator Massacre | Banned due to containing a significant amount of eroticized sexual violence, and for scenes of intercourse between characters intended to be brother and sister. The original version, (unofficially) "rated XXX" in its US release to indicate hardcore pornography, runs 96 minutes; the version submitted to the BBFC was 20 minutes shorter than this and had already had all clearly unsimulated sexual activity and sight of semen removed to satisfy their Guidelines for "18" as opposed to "R18" sex works, but the violence and incestuous set-up are considered equally unacceptable in material intended for sexual arousal of the viewer irrespective of explicitness. |
| 2009–2013 | NF713 | A film in which a female "enemy of the state" is tortured, it was banned after its primary purpose was judged to be "to sexually arouse the viewer at the sight of a woman being sexually humiliated, tortured and abused". It later passed uncut with an 18 certificate for a streaming release. |
| 2009–present | Grotesque | Banned due to a high level of sexual torture. Unlike other torture films like Hostel and Saw, Grotesque was deemed by Examiners not to have sufficiently contextualised its sadistic imagery. |
| 2009–present | My Daughter's a Cocksucker | An incest-themed pornographic film in which men perform irrumatio on women, who frequently look directly into the camera and deliver lines such as "Daddy always likes it when I choke" and "Am I good enough to teach the little sister?" The Guidelines at 'R18' allow for real oral sex including 'deep throat' scenes but not a focus on images or verbal references to choking, gagging, etc. which is considered an 'abusive, degrading and dehumanizing' and potentially harmful sexual portrayal by the BBFC. In many hardcore productions such scenes are cut, but here they were so frequent- along with the also unacceptable references to an incestuous set-up- a viable work would not remain following cuts and it was instead rejected. |
| 2010–present | Lost in the Hood | A gay pornographic film with a plot line depicting men as abducted, brutalized, and raped by other men. The sex is unsimulated and was, in real life, consensual but "rape fantasy" sex works are not permitted by UK censors, whether or not they would likely fall foul of the Criminal Justice and Immigration Act 2008's prohibition on 'extreme pornography'. |
| 2011 | The Human Centipede 2 (Full Sequence) | Originally banned due to highly explicit sexual violence, degradation, mutilation, torture, graphic forced defecation, and potential obscenity the BBFC board members criticized the film for making "little attempt to portray any of the victims in the film as anything other than objects to be brutalized and degraded for the amusement and sexual arousal of the main character and for the pleasure of the viewer". The film was given an official age certificate of 18 by the BBFC in 2011 while the distributors agreed to make 32 cuts (two minutes and thirty-seven seconds) prior to release. |
| 2011–present | The Bunny Game | Banned due to extensive unacceptably presented scenes of rape and sexualized violence. The eroticisation and arguable endorsement of such violence was deemed by the Board to have the potential for being highly harmful under the Video Recordings Act 1984. |
| 2015–present | Hate Crime | The first ever video-on-demand submission to be refused a certificate by the BBFC as it focused on "the terrorisation, mutilation, physical and sexual abuse and murder of the members of a Jewish family by the Neo Nazi thugs who invade their home." Technically the film is not "banned" in a legal sense as there is no requirement for films released solely online to be BBFC-classified, and no jury or magistrate has ever condemned it as violating one of the laws applying to online material distributed in Britain (such as containing indecent images of under-18s, being obscene, constituting incitement to hatred or glorification of terrorism.) As the same or stricter criteria are applied to video works, it would however certainly be unlawful to supply in the UK on a physical medium where the Video Recordings Act does mandate BBFC approval. |
| 2021–present | Gestapo's Last Orgy | The 1977 Italian exploitation film was submitted to the BBFC for DVD release by 88 Films. It was refused classification and therefore release in the United Kingdom on 26 January 2021. In its reasoning the BBFC cited the film's pervasive Nazi imagery, anti-Semitic nature and scenes of extreme sexual violence and rape. As these themes run throughout the film and serve as a central plot point, cuts were deemed unsupportable. |
| 2025–present | To Kill a War Machine | This documentary on activist group Palestine Action was initially granted an uncut 15 certificate on 5 June 2025, for "images of real dead bodies and injury, criminal behaviour". When the group was proscribed as a terrorist organisation on 4 July, the board had to withdraw the film's clearance under criminal law and the Terrorism Act 2000, as section 12 (2) forbids content which "supports (or) furthers the activities of a proscribed organisation". |

== Specific cases ==
- In Autumn 1972, Lord Longford and Raymond Blackburn decided to pursue a matter of pornography classification for the film Language of Love into the Court of Appeal of Lord Denning, MR, and lost the writ of mandamus against the Police Commissioner, who had refused to intrude upon the BBFC remit.
- In 1999, the British television network ITV broadcast a censored version of the British war film The Dam Busters (1955), with all instances of the name of a dog called "Nigger" removed. ITV blamed regional broadcaster London Weekend Television, which in turn alleged that a junior staff member had been responsible for the unauthorised cuts. When ITV again showed a censored version in June 2001, it was criticised by Index on Censorship as "unnecessary and ridiculous" and because the edits introduced continuity errors. The code word "nigger" transmitted in Morse Code upon the successful completion of the central mission was not censored.
- The film Black Friday (2004) was released in the United Kingdom with 17 seconds of the cockfighting scenes deleted. Laws in the UK do not allow any film footage of actual animal cruelty that has been deliberately orchestrated by film-makers.

== See also ==
- List of banned films
- Cinema of the United Kingdom
- Censorship in the United Kingdom
- Video nasty
- British Board of Film Classification (BBFC / Classification)
  - John Trevelyan (censor), former secretary (now called director) of the BBFC 1958-1971
  - James Ferman, former director of the BBFC 1975-1999
  - Robin Duval, former director of the BBFC 1999-2004
