= Video Recordings Act =

Video Recordings Act may refer to:

- Video Recordings Act 1984 in the United Kingdom
- Video Recordings Act 1987 in New Zealand
- Video Recordings Act 2010 in the United Kingdom
