= History of British film certificates =

Film censorship rating list

This article chronicles the history of British film certificates.

== Overview ==
The UK's film ratings are decided by the British Board of Film Classification and have been since 1912. Previously, there were no agreed rating standards, and local councils imposed their own – often differing – conditions or restrictions. For cinema releases, the BBFC has no legal power (technically, films do not even have to be submitted for classification), as it falls to councils to decide who should be admitted to a certain film, but they generally apply the BBFC's certificates, effectively making them legally binding. In exceptional cases, councils may impose their own conditions, either raising or lowering the minimum entry age from the certificate, banning a certified film outright, or setting their own minimum entry age for films that have never been submitted for BBFC certification, or which have been refused a certificate by the Board.

Prior to 1985, there were no legally binding ratings on video releases. The Video Recordings Act 1984 introduced new legal powers to certify video releases independently from any existing cinema certificate, with the BBFC being required to rate every new video release (except those exempted from classification) to determine the minimum age of people to whom the recording can be supplied, whether by sale or rental. In August 2009 it was discovered that the Video Recordings Act 1984 never had legal effect, due to a technical error when the terms of the act were not communicated to the European Commission. The relevant provisions were re-enacted by Parliament as the Video Recordings Act 2010.

The following list chronicles the BBFC's ratings system from its inception to the present.

In each section, italics indicates when a certificate has changed since the previous system.

== History ==
=== 1912–1932 ===
At first, there were just two advisory certificates.

Symbol	Name	Definition/Notes
U	Universal	Persons of all ages will be admitted.
A	Adult	More suitable for adults (advisory).

In Ireland, following the independence of the Irish Free State in 1922 (now the Republic of Ireland), the Irish Film Censor's Office was created in 1923 in place of the BBFC. This was renamed the Irish Film Classification Office in 2008.

=== 1932–1951 ===
An H (Horrific) certificate was added in 1932 to alert parents to horror-themed material.

Symbol	Name	Definition/Notes
U	Universal	Persons of all ages will be admitted.
A	Adult	More suitable for adults (advisory).
H	Horrific	Indicates horror (advisory).

=== 1951–1970 ===
Following a recommendation by the County Councils Association to replace the BBFC, the government established a committee chaired by Professor Kenneth Wheare to examine film censorship. The committee's findings were published in 1950 and proposed creation of four new certificates: X – films aimed at adults only, from which children should be absolutely excluded; C – films aimed specifically at children; Category U – films suitable for all; Category A – films suitable for all, but dealing with mild adult subject matter. Only one of these proposals were adopted and saw for the first time, a compulsory certificate, X, introduced allowing only those aged 16 and older to enter. This replaced the H certificate.

Symbol	Name	Definition/Notes
U	Universal	Persons of all ages will be admitted.
A	Adult	More suitable for adults (advisory).
X	X	For persons over the age of 16.

=== 1970–1982 ===
On 1 July 1970 the A certificate was split into two: The old 'A' (advisory) category was split to create a new advisory 'A' which permitted the admission of children of 5 years or over whether accompanied or not, but which warned parents that a film in this category would contain some material that parents might prefer their children under 14 not to see while the new AA allowed only those aged 14 or over to be admitted. As there was now a mandatory certificate at 14, the X certificate was modified to raise its age from 16 to 18. All the rating symbols were also graphically modernised.

Symbol	Name	Title Card Colour	Definition/Notes
U	Universal	Yellow	Suitable for all ages.
A	Advisory	Green	Those aged 5 and older admitted, but not recommended for children under 14 years of age
AA	AA	Blue	No persons under 14 can be admitted.
X	X	Red	No persons under 18 can be admitted.

=== 1982–1985 ===
On 1 November 1982 the ratings system was completely overhauled with only the U certificate remaining unchanged (though its description was slightly modified). The A certificate was replaced by PG, which was now completely advisory. The age of AA was raised a year and the certificate was renamed 15. The X certificate was unchanged but renamed 18 due to the lewd reputation that the letter X had acquired. A new R18 certificate was introduced for sexually explicit films. In order to show R18 films, cinemas must be licensed members-only clubs (previously, a loophole allowed these clubs to show such films unrated). The current and new certificates introduced different shapes for each rating.

Symbol	Name	Definition/Notes
U	Universal	Suitable for all ages.
PG	Parental Guidance	General viewing, but some scenes may be unsuitable for young children.
15	15	No person under the age of 15 to be admitted.
18	18	No person under the age of 18 to be admitted.
R18	Restricted 18	To be shown only in licensed cinemas to persons of not less than 18 years.

=== 1985–1989 ===
The Video Recordings Act 1984 gave the BBFC the legal responsibility to rate all videos. The current certificates were all used and were also modified and coloured. A new Uc certificate was introduced for videos only to indicate a recording that is especially suitable for young children to watch on their own. Those under the age of a certificate could not buy or rent a video with that certificate. Shops wishing to sell or rent R18 videos had to apply for a licence. Video releases in this period often featured unofficial logos with a plain background.

Symbol		Name	Definition/notes
Cinema	Video	Name	Definition/notes
N/A	Uc	Universal Children	Particularly suitable for children. (Home video only.)
U	U	Universal	Suitable for all.
PG	PG	Parental Guidance	General viewing, but some scenes may be unsuitable for young children.
15	15	15	Suitable only for persons of 15 years and over. (Not to be supplied to any person below that age)
18	18	18	Suitable only for persons of 18 years and over. (Not to be supplied to any person below that age)
R18	R18	Restricted 18	To be supplied only in licensed sex shops to persons of not less than 18 years.

=== 1989–2002 ===
The BBFC had been pushing for the introduction of a new 12 rating, similar to PG-13 which had been introduced in the United States in 1984. In 1989, Curzon Film Distributors asked Westminster City Council, who controlled the licensing of cinemas in the West End of London, to use the rating on its release of Madame Sousatzka in the West End on 21 March 1989. The 12 certificate was officially introduced nationally on 1 August 1989, with the first film to be released nationally with the rating being Batman, although some local authorities gave it a 15 certificate. Film distributors favoured the rating as it widened the audience for films that previously might have been restricted to people over 15 however, exhibitors were not keen as they would become responsible for policing the rating and could lose their licence to trade if allowing under age patrons. The new certificate was initially for cinema use only and did not cover videos as the British Videogram Association was against it, believing that it would cause confusion. From 1989, video releases featured the official BBFC logos. The 12 certificate was eventually introduced for videos on 1 July 1994. As the 12 certificate did not apply to video releases before July 1994, several films which had been issued a 12 classification for cinema release had to have a decision made about them regarding which rating was suitable for a video release and if a 15 certificate was deemed too high a rating for a particular film, a PG certificate was given with possible cuts to fit the rating. Films which received the 12 classification for cinema and 15 classification for video include Uncle Buck, which later passed with 12 for video on re-submission, and Nuns on the Run, which currently remains 15, with re-submission. All of the symbols were also graphically edited with lighter text in 1999 from the bolder text used since 1985 although many home video releases continued to use the previous symbols.

In 2002, the cinema 12 certificate was modified and renamed 12A. Those under 12 could now be admitted to 12A films, provided that they were accompanied by an adult aged at least 18 years old, although the BBFC recommends that 12A films are generally unsuitable for children under 12 years old. Contrary to popular belief, the certificate was not introduced for the film Spider-Man; the first film to receive it was actually The Bourne Identity. However, Spider-Man and other films still on general release at the time were reclassified as 12A. Introduction of the 12A followed two years of consultation and a trial period in Norwich, during which time the certificate was known as PG-12 (see below). The video 12 certificate remained unchanged.

Symbol		Name	Definition/notes
Cinema	Video & DVD	Name	Definition/notes
N/A	Uc	Universal Children	Particularly suitable for children. (Home video only)
U	U	Universal	Suitable for all.
PG	PG	Parental Guidance	General viewing, but some scenes may be unsuitable for young children.
12A	N/A	12A	Generally suitable for those aged 12 and over (cinema only); those under 12 admitted, but only if accompanied by an adult.
12	12	12	Suitable only for persons of 12 years and over. (Not to be supplied to any person below that age)
15	15	15	Suitable only for persons of 15 years and over. (Not to be supplied to any person below that age)
18	18	18	Suitable only for persons of 18 years and over. (Not to be supplied to any person below that age)
R18	R18	Restricted 18	To be supplied only in licensed sex shops to persons of not less than 18 years.

=== 2002–2020 ===
In September 2002, all of the symbols were graphically modernised but retained all their main features (colour, shape, etc.). The Uc certificate was retired in 2009, and replaced with BBFCInsight which states where works are 'particularly suitable for pre-school children'; however, older DVDs may still carry the Uc certificate. The consumer advice for the U certificate was updated to advise parents to check the film in case of children under the age of 4 and PG in case of children under 8.

Symbol	Name	Definition/Notes
Uc	Universal Children	Particularly suitable for children. (Home video only; retired in 2009)
U	Universal	Suitable for all.
PG	Parental Guidance	General viewing, but some scenes may be unsuitable for young children.
12A	12A	Generally suitable for those aged 12 and over (cinema only); those under 12 admitted, but only if accompanied by an adult.
12	12	Suitable only for persons of 12 years and over. (Not to be supplied to any person below that age) (Home video only)
15	15	Suitable only for persons of 15 years and over. (Not to be supplied to any person below that age)
18	18	Suitable only for persons of 18 years and over. (Not to be supplied to any person below that age)
R18	Restricted 18	To be supplied only in licensed sex shops to persons of not less than 18 years.

=== 2019–present ===
The 12 symbol was made the same colour as the 12A symbol, whilst the 15 symbol changed from having a white background with red writing to a magenta background with white writing. In October 2019, for the first time, all of the symbols were redesigned for digital streaming services and theatrical releases. However, the packaged media continued to only use the previous symbols until late April 2020, although a transition period was allowed for video releases to use either the old or new symbols until 5 October 2020, after which all packaged media must by law use the new symbols. The BBFCInsight was replaced with ratings info.

Symbol	Name	Definition/Notes
Green triangle with U in centre	Universal	Suitable for all.
Yellow triangle with PG in centre	Parental Guidance	General viewing, but some scenes may be unsuitable for young children.
Orange circle with 12A in centre	12A	Generally suitable for those aged 12 and over; those under 12 admitted, but only if accompanied by an adult (cinema only).
Orange circle with 12 in centre	12	Suitable only for persons of 12 years and over. (Not to be supplied to any person below that age) (Home video only)
Pink circle with 15 in centre	15	Suitable only for persons of 15 years and over. (Not to be supplied to any person below that age)
Red circle with 18 in centre	18	Suitable only for persons of 18 years and over. (Not to be supplied to any person below that age)
Blue rectangle with R18 in centre	Restricted 18	To be supplied only in licensed sex shops to persons of not less than 18 years.

== Non-standard certificates and ratings ==
Symbol	Name	Definition/Notes
PG-12	PG-12	Generally suitable for those aged 12 and older (cinema only); those under 12 admitted, but only if accompanied by an adult. This experimental certificate was used during a short BBFC trial in Norwich from October 2001 to January 2002, in which all 12 certificate films on release were classed as PG-12. Norwich was chosen due to its relative isolation from other large towns, in order to avoid significant numbers of children travelling there to specifically take advantage of the relaxed controls. The results of the trial led to the adoption of the 12A later in 2002. Between the end of the Norwich trial and the actual introduction of the 12A, a PG-12 rating was used by Tameside Council in June 2002 for Spider-Man, overruling the BBFC's 12 certification of the film. In addition, some other councils awarded the film a PG certificate.
—N/a	15A	Generally suitable for those aged 15 and over (cinema only); those under 15 admitted, but only if accompanied by an adult. Belfast City Council used this non-standard certificate for The Batman (2022) and Five Nights at Freddy's (2023). This allowed children under the age of 15 to watch the films if accompanied by an adult at a cinema in Belfast, overruling the BBFC's 15 certification for both films.
—N/a	Exempt	This is not a BBFC rating certificate, but rather a statement from the distributor certifying that they believe a video recording is exempt from classification under the Video Recordings Act 1984 (e.g. educational material, music and sport).

== See also ==
- BBFC
- 18 certificate
- R18 certificate
- Motion picture rating systems
