= Bare Behind Bars =

1980 film directed by Oswaldo de Oliveira

- Directed by: Oswaldo de Oliveira
- Written by: Oswaldo de Oliveira
- Produced by: Alexandre Adamin; Antonio Polo Galante
- Starring: Maria Stella Splendore; Marta Anderson; Danielle Ferrite; Neide Ribeiro; Márcia Fraga
- Cinematography: Oswaldo de Oliveira
- Edited by: Gilberto Wagner
- Music by: Estudios Galante
- Production companies: Ao Lixao Comercio de Moveis Ltda. Galante Filmes
- Release date: 1980
- Running time: 87 minutes (Netherlands); 95 minutes (USA)
- Country: Brazil
- Languages: Portuguese; English dub

Bare Behind Bars (released in Brazil as A Prisão) is a 1980 sexploitation film directed and written by Oswaldo de Oliveira. The film, which was intended as a spoof of the common "women in prison" genre, stars Maria Stella Splendore, Marta Anderson and Danielle Ferrite. The story concerns a group of lesbian inmates who are sexually abused by a sadistic female prison warden. The film features gratuitous nudity and sex scenes.

== Plot ==
In a women's prison in Brazil, the inmates are young and beautiful, the warden is a sadist, all but one of the guards are cruel, and the nurse is incompetent. To make it difficult for the inmates to hide contraband, they wear no underwear. They are alternately murderous and orgiastic with each other, and they engage in sex play with some of the guards. The warden pimps out inmates to wealthy lesbians. With the help of the nurse and under the cover of Carnival, three inmates stage an escape. But once out they contrive to stay undiscovered as the authorities close in.

== Cast ==
- Maria Stella Splendore as Sylvia – the prison warden
- Marta Anderson as Barbara – the insane nurse
- Danielle Ferrite as Cynthia – Prisoner #341
- Neide Ribeiro as Sandra – the assistant warden
- Márcia Fraga
- Serafim Gonzalez
- Meiry Vieira as Regular customer
- Sonia Regina
- Marliane Gomes
- Nadia Destro

== Release ==
The film was banned by BBFC in the United Kingdom after independent film distributor Redemption Films attempted to distribute the film in 1994. Redemption Films challenged the decision in court the following year, arguing that "the BBFC was neither fair nor consistent in its approach when classifying the video." It was the first time in 84 years that film censorship in Britain was "exposed to court scrutiny." Nigel Wingrove, the founder of Redemption, said he spent $25,000 in his fight to get the film released. He also opined, "the bottom line is that most people don't give a damn about censorship; nobody cares whether you went to court to fight for a film like Bare Behind Bars.

== Home media ==
An uncut version of the film was released on video in 1997 in the United States by Redemption Films. It was released on DVD by Blue Underground on 30 May 2006.

== Reception ==
Scott Weinberg from DVD Talk wrote "this is an astonishingly bad piece of grindhouse filmmaking ... a series of painful and dingy sequences of sex and humiliation than anything resembling an actual story, the film parades its requisite components with an assembly-line regularity: evil she-bitch lesbian wardens, virginal newcomers experiencing their first tastes of reluctant cunnilingus, whips, shackles, sex slaves, brutal brawls, a few large tables you'd never want to eat off of, and a gaggle of freaky naked ladies."

Author Alison Darren said "sleazy and unremitting, this exploitation film is distinguished from the usual doss by its wit and lack of pretension." Film critic Antônio Da Silva opined that "although intended to titillate – and it does – the film touches on important social issues, but lacks a consistent plot." The Sleazoid Express stated "the south of Tijuana approach of the film makes it not the most appetizing empinada in the WIP universe; it doesn’t have much in clever kinks, narrative twists, or attractive and charismatic actresses."

Film critic Raymond Murray wrote "this poorly made soft–core women in prison sex–and–flesh-filled exploitation flick has little going for it except that it is, without a doubt, the most lesbian–oriented (at least sexually graphic) of the all the WIP films; nearly every woman in the film has sex with another woman; it's trash...amusing lesbian trash."

== See also ==
- Cinema of Brazil
- List of Brazilian films of 1980
- Film censorship in the United Kingdom
- List of films banned in the United Kingdom
- List of LGBTQ-related films of 1980
- List of feature films with lesbian characters
- Women-in-prison film
