= R18 (British Board of Film Classification) =

BBFC content rating used for hardcore pornographic films

BBFC R18 category symbol, used since 2019

R18 (Restricted 18) is a film and video classification given by the British Board of Film Classification (BBFC). It is intended to provide a classification for works that do not breach UK law, but exceed what the BBFC considers acceptable in the 18 category. In practice, this means hardcore pornography.

Under the terms of the Video Recordings Act 1984 all non-exempt videos sold or distributed within the UK must be given a certificate by the BBFC. The distributor must decide whether a video is exempt. Uncertificated recordings are not illegal, regardless of content (except where the content itself is illegal—e.g. child pornography), but supply (i.e. sale, rental, loan or gift) of them is. The R18 certificate is the most restrictive of the certificates, allowing films in the category to be shown only in specially licensed cinemas, or sold in licensed sex shops; admission to R18-rated films or sale of R18-rated recordings is restricted to persons aged 18 years and over.

== Background ==
R18 symbol used from 2002 until 2019

The R18 category was created in 1982 in response to the recommendations in 1979 of the Home Office Committee on Obscenity and Film Censorship chaired by Sir Bernard Williams. Originally, the R18 classification was only used for films featuring simulated sex, but the BBFC found itself forced to award R18 certificates to hardcore films in 2000 after a series of legal appeals and a judicial review of those appeals.

The introduction of the R18 certificate for hardcore films is widely seen by observers as a reaction to more liberal attitudes in British society to pornography, the de facto legalisation of the import of hardcore pornography (but not its sale) across EU member countries because of customs law harmonisation, and the widespread availability of unregulated pornography over the Internet.

Most cuts made by the BBFC are in the R18 category (e.g., 13.6% of R18 videos were cut in 2011, compared with 7.5% for the 18 category, and 0.5% or less for other categories). On the BBFC website, R18-rated works are filtered out of the main public search (unless an option to show them is selected) as their titles frequently contain profanity and/or vulgar language.

== Regulation of content ==
The BBFC specifies in detail what kinds of acts are permitted to be depicted in works receiving an R18 certificate, and which are not. In particular, it prohibits:

- Works judged to be illegal under the Obscene Publications Act 1959.
- Material deemed likely to encourage an interest in "sexually abusive" activity, which can include adults role-playing as non adults.
- Depiction of non-consensual acts (including role-play).
- Use of bondage which prevents indicating a withdrawal of consent (e.g., gags).
- Infliction of pain which may cause lasting physical harm, whether real or simulated.
- Penetration by any object deemed likely to cause physical harm.
- Depiction of any sexual threats, coercion, humiliation or abuse, even if consensual, unless clearly depicted as a consensual role-playing game.
- Depictions of sexual violence and most fetishes.

Although R18 does allow for the depiction of most consensual sex acts such as vaginal sexual intercourse, oral sex, masturbation, anal sex and some moderate BDSM between any combination of men and women, the following is prohibited:

- Material which is deemed in breach or potential breach of current interpretation of the Protection of Children Act 1978.
- Roleplay where one participant plays a child or incest is featured, and rape fantasies (even if all participants are in fact consenting adults). Much of Marc Dorcel's low budget work and many U.S. "barely legal" films are prohibited from UK release under this rubric.
- Rough sex such as spitting, hair pulling, and gagging during fellatio – strong verbal abuse may also be removed if continuous and seen as dehumanising.
- Penetration with large or dangerous objects, or those associated with violence- scenes involving power drills attached to dildos, imitation firearms, ice cubes, spiked spheres, hammers, pool cues and many other items have been cut.
- Urolagnia – simple urination is permitted but urination onto or into a person, licking or drinking the urine, or urinating while masturbating will be cut; urination by a woman while she rubs her breasts and female ejaculation have previously been removed.
- Expulsion of enemas onto a person, licking/drinking enema fluid, any sight of faeces or vomit, protracted focus on menstrual blood- only one live action work has been cut for scenes involving menstruation, and several Japanese animations (hentai);.
- Use of illegal drugs during a sex scene.
- Promotion of dangerous fetish activities.
- Verbal references to rape, incest or childhood sexual activity or development within the sex scene.
- Sight of serious injuries or blood after sado-masochistic scenes; dripping of hot wax; images of bound and gagged performers (as they cannot withdraw consent).
- Depiction of coprophagia, bloodplay, and fisting.

The acts include those deemed likely to contravene the Obscene Publications Act 1959. Depiction of urolagnia, fisting and various hardcore BDSM acts were deemed legal in January 2012 in R v Peacock. Following a public consultation, the Crown Prosecution Service published guidelines in 2019 indicating that pornography depicting consenting adults engaged in legal acts would no longer be prosecuted under the Act, provided no serious harm was caused and the likely audience was over the age of 18.; it is unclear as to whether the BBFC will revise its guidelines, but they announced that they are discussing what to do next.

== Legal provisions ==
Films given the R18 certificate may only be exhibited in licensed cinemas and can only be sold on physical media direct to the buyer in person in licensed sex shops. Ofcom also prohibit the transmission of R18 material as part of a television broadcast, although these restrictions do not apply to hotel television systems which are not regulated by Ofcom.

The BBFC do not have jurisdiction over content distributed via non-physical media; however, in 2014 the Audiovisual Media Services Regulations 2014 amended the Communications Act 2003 to extend the statutory and legal obligations for the distribution of R18 content to "on-demand" programme services, such as streaming media/video on demand over the internet or mobile phone networks and web-based platforms. The revisions make it a criminal offence to not adequately restrict access to works rated R18 by the BBFC—or any work that would be likely to receive a R18 classification if it were submitted—to those aged over 18. These provisions are only applicable to services whose principal purpose is to provide content that is comparable to what is normally found in television services and if the service enables the user to select the programme and permits viewing at a time chosen by them.

== Recent developments ==
In 2004 a group of video distributors appealed to the Video Appeals Committee (VAC) against the BBFC's decision to award R18 certificates to 9 films that the distributors wished to be reclassified as 18. A press release issued by the BBFC on 20 July 2005 announced that the VAC had dismissed that appeal.

The BBFC has previously granted 18 certificates for movies containing short scenes of unsimulated sex, such as Catherine Breillat's Romance (in 1999), Virginie Despentes's Baise Moi (in 2000), Patrice Chéreau's Intimacy (in 2001), Michael Winterbottom's 9 Songs (in 2004), short-film compilation Destricted (in 2006), and in 2008 the hardcore version of Tinto Brass's Caligula was passed uncut for DVD with an 18.

The Digital Economy Act 2017 includes powers to require age-verification for pornographic Internet sites and the government accepted an amendment to allow the regulator to require ISPs to block access to non-compliant sites. As the BBFC are expected to become the regulator, this has caused discussion about ISPs being required to block Internet pornography that would be prohibited under an R18 certificate, the prohibition of some of which is itself controversial.

== See also ==
- History of British film certificates
- X rating
