= The Manson Family (film) =

1997 American horror film directed by Jim Van Bebber

- Theatrical release poster
- Directed by: Jim Van Bebber
- Written by: Jim Van Bebber
- Produced by: Carl Daft; David Gregory; Mike King; Jim Van Bebber
- Starring: Marcelo Games; Marc Pitman; Leslie Orr
- Cinematography: Mike King
- Edited by: Michael Capone; Jim Van Bebber
- Music by: Philip Anselmo; Ross Karpelman
- Production company: Mercury Films
- Distributed by: Dinsdale Releasing (Theatrical); Dark Sky Films; MPI Home Video (DVD)
- Release dates: October 22, 1997 (US); August 23, 2003 (London)
- Running time: 95 minutes 84 minutes (R-rated cut)
- Country: United States
- Language: English
- Box office: $19,140

The Manson Family is a 1997 American true crime exploitation horror film written, produced, edited, and directed by Jim Van Bebber. The film covers the lives of Charles Manson and his family of followers.

== Plot ==
In 1996, Jack Wilson is producing a crime docuseries segment on the Manson Family murders. Narrated via contemporaneous interviews and flashbacks, several former members of Charles "Charlie" Manson's "family" recount their time spent leading up to the August 1969 murder spree. Tex Watson is brought to Spahn Ranch, a former movie set-turned-commune where Manson is housing his followers. Tex ingratiates himself with the group, who spend their time taking copious amounts of LSD, smoking marijuana, and engaging in group sex; meanwhile, Charlie unsuccessfully attempts to get a record deal with his folk music.

Several of the male members, including Tex and Bobby Beausoleil, attempt to recruit Simi, a young woman, into the family. They convince her to take LSD before the entire family gang rapes her at Charlie's command. The group begin breaking into random homes in Los Angeles, stealing items and rearranging furniture while the occupants sleep. Later, during a dispute over a drug transaction, Charlie shoots and kills Lotsapoppa, an African American drug dealer whom he suspects is part of the Black Panthers.

The whole family engage in a mass ritualistic orgy in which they sacrifice a puppy. After, Tex informs follower Patricia Krenwinkel and several others that he is afraid of Charlie and wants to leave. Meanwhile, Bobby and Susan Atkins confront an acquaintance, music teacher Gary Hinman, at his home, planning to raid his house of money, as they believe him to be wealthy. When the plan goes unsuccessfully, Gary is held hostage for two days before Charlie arrives and slices his ear off. After Charlie leaves, Susan attempts to nurse Gary back to health, but she and Bobby find themselves unsure how to carry out the robbery, as Gary does not have money. As a last resort, Bobby stabs him in the chest, after which he and Susan smother him with a cushion. Susan writes the phrase "political piggy" on the wall in Gary's blood before they depart. Bobby is arrested days later while trying to flee town.

Under Charlie's instruction, Tex, Susan, and Patricia Krenwinkel, and Linda Kasabian depart on the evening of August 8 to break into houses in Los Angeles, and are told to "bring knives." They arrive at a home on Cielo Drive, where Tex shoots Steven Parent, a man sitting in his parked car, near the gate. They enter the home and bind its residents, including Sharon Tate, Jay Sebring, Abigail Folger, and Voytek Frykowski. Tex shoots Jay before stabbing him to death. Tex shoots Voytek as he tries to flee before bludgeoning him with the pistol while the sheepish Linda watches in horror. Susan proceeds to attack Abigail in the kitchen, stabbing her before Tex slashes her throat. Abigail, clinging to life, stumbles outside before collapsing in the lawn. Meanwhile, the pregnant Sharon is brutally stabbed to death in the living room.

The next night, the four members, in addition to Leslie Van Houten and Steve Grogan, viciously murder Leno and Rosemary LaBianca in their home. Two weeks later, several members murder Donald Shea at Charlie's instruction, as he fears Donald knows too much and could provide authorities information in the Tate-LaBianca murders. Later, the family members, including Charlie, are arrested and indicted on the murders. From jail, Manson accrues a cult following of young people who speak out in his support to the media. Whilst watching a segment of the docuseries one night, Wilson is murdered by a group of youths in a style likely inspired by the Manson Family.

== Cast ==
- Marcello Games as Charlie Manson
- Marc Pitman as Tex Watson
- Leslie Orr as Patty Krenwinkel
- Maureen Allisse as Sadie Atkins
- Amy Yates as Leslie Van Houten
- Jim Van Bebber as Bobby
- Tom Burns
- Nate Pennington as Shorty
- Carl Day as Jack Wilson
- Corral Day as Franklin Riley

== Production ==
Despite support from various people, including members of the band Skinny Puppy, who provided an early musical score (in the form of Download's Charlie's Family album), the film remained incomplete for many years. A rough cut version screened at a number of festivals during 1997, including at the Fantasia Film Festival in July of that year.

The finished version of the film uses music by Phil Anselmo and Ross Karpelman, which was released on cassette in 2025 by the label Reanimated Miscarriage.

== Classification ==
Despite not being banned in any country in the world, it is classified harshly in almost all countries of the world due to its graphic violence and sexuality.

List of Classifications
Country	Classification
United States	R (Note: An unrated version is available in the United States, running an extra 11 minutes (95 minutes) to the R-rated cut (84 minutes).)
United Kingdom	18
Australia	R18+
Canada	R
New Zealand	R18
Norway	18

== Release ==
In 2003, the film screened at FrightFest in London under the title of Charlie's Family. During the screening, cinema staff called the police when bikers started a punch-up.

The film was released in a now out-of-print combination Blu-ray and DVD set in 2003 by Severin Films.

== Reception ==
On the review aggregator website Rotten Tomatoes, 68% of 31 critics' reviews are positive, with an average rating of 6/10. Metacritic, which uses a weighted average, assigned the film a score of 56 out of 100, based on 17 critics, indicating "mixed or average" reviews.

Dennis Harvey of Variety wrote, "Not everyone will appreciate The Manson Family (a strong stomach plus knowledge of both the actual events and the vintage shlock cinema Van Bebber subtly mimics and parodies here will help), but it's hard to imagine anyone finding the pic forgettable."

Roger Ebert of the Chicago Sun-Times gave the film three out of four stars and wrote, "It filled me with disgust and dismay, but I believe it was intended to, and in that sense was a success. It has an undeniable power and effect, but be sure you understand what you are getting yourself into. This is not a 'horror' film or an 'underground' film, but an act of transgression so extreme and uncompromised, and yet so amateurish and sloppy, that it exists in a category of one film — this film."

== See also ==
- Counterculture of the 1960s
- Exploitation film
- Extreme cinema
