= Quentin Thomas =

British civil servant

Sir Quentin Jeremy Thomas CB (born 1 August 1944) is a retired British civil servant, and former president of the British Board of Film Classification.

He attended the Perse School in Cambridge and Gonville and Caius College, Cambridge. He was a civil servant until 1999, serving in the Home Office, Northern Ireland Office and the Cabinet Office. His last civil service appointment was as Head of the Constitution Secretariat.

In the Northern Ireland Office from 1988 to 1998, he led the team which first met Sinn Féin following the 1994 cease fire. He led the team supporting Ministers in the 1996-98 roundtable talks, chaired by United States Senator George Mitchell, which culminated in the 1998 Good Friday Agreement. He was appointed a Companion of the Order of the Bath in 1994 and was knighted in 1999 for "services to peace in Northern Ireland".

In the Home Office he was Head of the Broadcasting Department (1984 to 1988), with responsibility for advising on the development of broadcasting policy, including cable and satellite broadcasting, and on relations between the government and the broadcasting authorities and other regulatory bodies.

Media offices
Preceded by Andreas Whittam Smith	President of the British Board of Film Classification; 2002–2012	Succeeded by Patrick Swaffer
