= Patrick Swaffer =

British media lawyer (born 1951)

- Born: 12 February 1951 (age 75); London, England
- Education: University of Exeter
- Occupation: Media lawyer
- Years active: 1974–present
- Known for: Former president of the British Board of Film Classification (BBFC)
- Children: 3

Patrick Swaffer (born 12 February 1951) is a British lawyer who has worked in a wide variety of media organisations. Formerly a legal advisor to the British Board of Film Classification (BBFC), he was appointed its president by the BBFC's Council of Management after an open competition on 17 October 2012, serving in the role for a decade. Swaffer is known for his input to the Media/Entertainment industry.

== Career ==
Patrick Swaffer was born and raised in London. He graduated from the University of Exeter with a law degree in 1973. In 1974, he joined Goodman Derrick solicitors as a senior and managing partner and completed his training for this position in 1976; he became a partner to the firm in 1979 in the Media department, in 2009 he became a consultant to that firm. Swaffer also sits as a recorder in the Crown Court on the South Eastern Circuit. He is currently a partner in Media Compliance Services LLP.

Formerly a legal advisor to the British Board of Film Classification (BBFC), Swaffer became its president in 2012, succeeding Sir Quentin Thomas. It was announced in September 2022 that after a decade in the role Swaffer would be stepping down as president of the BBFC, to be replaced by Natasha Kaplinsky, effective from 17 October.

Swaffer chairs the board of the Bill Douglas Cinema Museum.

== Personal life ==
Swaffer married his wife Niroo in 1986 and they have three sons: Andrew, Matthew and Nicholas.

Media offices
Preceded by Sir Quentin Thomas	President of the British Board of Film Classification; 2012–2022	Succeeded by Natasha Kaplinsky
