= Terrorists, Killers and Middle-East Wackos =

Terrorists, Killers and Middle-East Wackos (also Terrorists, Killers and Other Wackos in the UK) is a shockumentary video from the makers of Bumfights. It includes footage of riots, suicides, executions, and the televised suicide of R. Budd Dwyer. All the scenes included are real scenes of death and suffering. The Bumfights website store touts the video as "One hour of the sickest images ever put to film."

The video was released in the US on June 21, 2005.

The film was refused classification in the United Kingdom, by the British Board of Film Classification (BBFC). The Board noting that it "presents no journalistic, educational or other justifying context for the images shown. Rather, the work presents a barrage of sensationalist clips, for what appears to be the underlying purpose of providing prurient entertainment ... The work invites the viewer to take sadistic pleasure in death." It was also suggested that the content may be in breach of the Obscene Publications Act.

In June 2006 a spokesman for the BBFC cited the film as an example of "something the majority of people would want not to view", in the context of proposals for a UK ratings system for online content.

Terrorists, Killers And Middle-East Wackos features music from the Happy Campers.

Bumfights's official website has removed the DVD.

== See also ==
- Snuff film
- Mondo film
