= Jim Van Bebber =

American film director (born 1964)

James Nathan “Jim” VanBebber (born November 24, 1964) is an American film director.

Born in Greenville, Ohio, VanBebber attended Wright State University where he studied cinema. Instead of using a bank loan to pay for a second year of college, he used the money to finance Deadbeat at Dawn, and founded the indie film company Asmodeus Productions with several colleagues. The Manson Family took more than ten years to complete.

A documentary about VanBebber titled Diary of a Deadbeat: The Story of Jim VanBebber covering his life from 2010 to 2015 was released in 2015.

== Filmography ==
- Gator Green (2013)
- The Manson Family (1997)
- Video Collection (1984–1992) (1996) (video for "Spasmolytic")
- Doper (1994)
- My Sweet Satan (1994)
- Roadkill: The Last Days of John Martin (1994)
- Kata (1990)
- Deadbeat at Dawn (1988)
