= James Ferman =

British-American television director and censor (1930–2002)

- Born: James Alan Ferman; April 11, 1930; New York City, U.S.
- Died: 24 December 2002 (aged 72); Hampstead, London, England
- Occupation: Director of the BBFC
- Years active: 1959–2002
- Spouse: Monica Robinson
- Children: 2

James Alan Ferman (11 April 1930 – 24 December 2002) was an American-British television and theatre director. While serving in the US Air Force, Ferman was stationed in Suffolk, England. He studied at Cambridge and went onto become a TV and film director. In 1975, he became the Secretary (later, the Director) of the British Board of Film Classification. He served in that role from 1975 to 1999 overseeing the classification of British films for more than 20 years and was variously criticised as being too harsh or too lenient.

== Early life and education ==
Ferman was born on April 11, 1930, the son of a film director. He started at Great Neck High School, New York in 1941. He received an English degree from Cornell University in 1951, where he was a member of the Pi Lambda Phi fraternity.

Ferman serving in the United States Air Force when he was stationed at Bentwaters Air Force Base in United Kingdom for two years. Ferman then studied English at King's College, Cambridge, earning an MA.

== Career ==
From 1957-1959, Ferman worked as a director at ABC Television, most notably on TV series such as Armchair Theatre. In 1959, he moved to ATV, directing TV shows, including Emergency Ward 10 and many documentaries. He also wrote the libretto for the musical Zuleika.

From 1966 to 1975, Ferman was a freelance director, working often for the BBC. He release numerous films and lectured in community studies at the Polytechnic of Central London from 1973-76.

=== British Board of Film Classification ===
In 1975, he got a job at the British Board of Film Classification.

At the BBFC, Ferman oversaw extensive liberalization of censorship standards and fronted a successful campaign for the Home Office to prohibit common law private prosecutions against films, which were being used extensively during the 1970s. In the late 1980s, he faced criticism by some media outlets who accused him of allowing videos to pass which they blamed for real-life violence. This led him to take caution over violent and sexually violent works, but his continued liberalization led to an anti-BBFC campaign run by the Daily Mail. He later faced criticism for refusing to allow several films from the 1970s to be released following the introduction of video censorship under the Video Recordings Act 1984 and the media outcry over "video nasties" (a collection of low-budget horror and exploitation films, often containing violence against women and said to be too violent and gory for UK release). These films, including works such as The Texas Chain Saw Massacre, were not without cultural value, said many cultural commentators.

Ferman was also well known for his policies on illegal weapons, which resulted in sequences involving nunchuks being removed, including in films such as Enter the Dragon starring Bruce Lee, the Teenage Mutant Ninja Turtles and the Namco video game Soul Blade. One notable change in 1991's Teenage Mutant Ninja Turtles II: The Secret of the Ooze was after being unable to tell "the difference between a martial arts weapon and a sausage, and believing that children would be similarly bamboozled." However, under Ferman's tenure cuts to films, once comparatively routine, became exceedingly scarce. While liberal commentators complained about his refusal to release certain films, others (such as Mary Whitehouse) saw him as excessively lenient. This dichotomy was clear right up to the end of his tenure when he was criticized both for refusing to allow the release of The Exorcist on video and for permitting the uncut release of David Cronenberg's Crash (1996) in cinemas.

In 1997, Ferman clashed with new home secretary Jack Straw over policy on pornographic videos. Ferman released several hardcore pornographic films uncut after liberalizing the guidelines in 1996, suggesting that relaxation of restrictions would discourage illegal material. After Straw was appointed, Ferman failed to prevent him from forcing the BBFC to use the old, stricter guidelines on pornography, and from imposing a new president on the Board. In 1998, after these events, Ferman retired.

== Death ==
On 24 December 2002, Ferman was admitted to the Royal Free Hospital in Hampstead, London, with acute pneumonia. He died later that day.

== Personal life ==
Ferman married Monica Robinson in 1956 and the couple had two children, a son and a daughter.
