= Cinematograph Films (Animals) Act 1937 =

Act of the Parliament of the United Kingdom

Cinematograph Films (Animals) Act 1937 (Note: Section 2(1).)
- Act of Parliament
- Parliament of the United Kingdom
- Long title: An Act to prohibit the exhibition or distribution of cinematograph films in connection with the production of which suffering may have been caused to animals; and for purposes connected therewith.
- Citation: 1 Edw. 8 & 1 Geo. 6. c. 59
- Territorial extent: England and Wales; Scotland; (Note: Section 2(2).)

Dates
- Royal assent: 30 July 1937
- Commencement: 30 July 1937 (Note: The Acts of Parliament (Commencement) Act 1793.)
Other legislation
Amended by	Criminal Procedure (Scotland) Act 1975; Criminal Justice Act 1982; Criminal Justice Act 2003; Animal Welfare Act 2006; Animal Health and Welfare (Scotland) Act 2006 (Consequential Provisions) Order 2006
Relates to	Protection of Animals Act 1911; Protection of Animals (Scotland) Act 1912

Status: Amended

Text of statute as originally enacted

Text of the Cinematograph Films (Animals) Act 1937 as in force today (including any amendments) within the United Kingdom, from legislation.gov.uk.

The Cinematograph Films (Animals) Act 1937 (1 Edw. 8 & 1 Geo. 6. c. 59) is an act of the Parliament of the United Kingdom that defines a criminal offence of distributing or exhibiting a film that was "organised or directed in such a way as to involve the cruel infliction of pain or terror on any animal or the cruel goading of any animal to fury" - in other words, one in which actual cruelty to animals (as distinct from simulated, e.g. through the use of special effects or CGI) was photographed and/or occurred during the production.

Offences under the act are punishable by a fine and/or up to three months' imprisonment. Section 2 of the act creates a valid defence that the defendant "had reasonable cause to believe" that scenes of animal cruelty in a film were simulated, not actual. The definition of an animal under the act is that of the Protection of Animals Act 1911.

== History ==
It is unclear why the act was passed when it was, or if any single event prompted it to be put before Parliament. Concern had been expressed in the press during the early to mid-1930s at scenes in mainstream feature films that were suspected of showing actual animal cruelty, one prominent example being Island of Lost Souls (1932). According to the British Board of Film Classification's website, the act was a response to "widespread public concern about the mistreatment of animals on film sets, especially in Westerns."

== Contemporary usage ==
The act has never been repealed, and remains in force. The British Board of Film Classification (BBFC), in keeping with their policy of not sanctioning the release of any film if it believes that the release itself could constitute a criminal act, will occasionally refuse a certificate or require cuts to scenes it suspects involve actual animal cruelty. A notable case was the UK release of Amores perros in 2001, in which the BBFC accepted the producers' claim that controversial dog fighting scenes were simulated, not actual, and passed the film uncut.

The phrase 'cruel infliction' is understood to mean cruelty to animals that was specifically and gratuitously inflicted with the sole purpose of creating an entertainment film. Therefore, for example, the screening of a documentary about bullfighting or an educational film about vivisection in medical research would be unlikely to result in prosecution under the act, because any footage of actual animal cruelty would be of an event that would have taken place regardless of whether or not it had been filmed, and the purpose of screening that footage is not entertainment. However, a film such as Electrocuting an Elephant would probably fall foul of the act (had it been in force at the time), as the electrocution took place primarily as a public spectacle, and it was filmed purely for popular entertainment purposes.
