= Grotesque (2009 film) =

2009 Japanese horror film directed by Kōji Shiraishi

- Japanese release poster
- Directed by: Kōji Shiraishi
- Written by: Kōji Shiraishi
- Produced by: Kazue Udagawa; Kyōsuke Ueno
- Starring: Hiroaki Kawatsure; Tsugumi Nagasawa; Shigeo Ōsako
- Cinematography: Yōhei Fukuda
- Edited by: Tsuyoshi Sone
- Music by: Kazuo Satō
- Production companies: Ace Deuce Entertainment; Tornado Film
- Distributed by: JollyRoger (Japan); Media Blasters (US)
- Release date: January 17, 2009 (Japan)
- Running time: 73 minutes
- Country: Japan
- Language: Japanese

Grotesque (Japanese: グロテスク, Hepburn: Gurotesuku) is a 2009 Japanese exploitation horror film written and directed by Kōji Shiraishi. It gained notoriety for its graphic violence, and follows a sadistic doctor who abducts a young couple and tortures them.

== Plot ==
A young couple, Aki Miyashita and Kazuo Kojima, are kidnapped off the street during their first date. They wake up shackled and ball-gagged in a basement with plastic-covered walls. A sadistic madman subjects them to a series of degrading mutilation and torture rituals with no further explanation, beginning by slicing Kazuo's tongue and gouging out his right eye. He also sexually assaults both while forcing the other to watch. He later severs Kazuo's fingers with a chainsaw, and proceeds to string the fingers together onto a necklace, which he forces Aki to wear. He then begins doing the same to her; when she screams out for him to stop, he punishes her by slicing off both of her nipples with scissors, then using the chainsaw to cut off her right arm.

The kidnapper, who is simply carrying out his actions for sexual gratification, finally castrates Kazuo, claiming he has found all the sexual relief he needs and no longer requires the couple's "services". The couple is moved to a room resembling a modern, clean hospital room, where the kidnapper tends to their wounds and reveals that he is actually a wealthy, reputable doctor. He tells the couple that they will be free to go once their injuries fully heal, promising to turn himself into the police, and, as an apology for all the suffering he inflicted, grant them his entire fortune as compensation. In a moment alone, Aki and Kazuo promise to support each other and stay together once they leave. However, on the day they are purported to leave, they are taken back to the basement, and Aki is bound with ropes while Kazuo is shackled again.

The man announces that he is forcing the couple to participate in one final test of love before he frees them. He slices into Kazuo's abdomen and pulls out his large intestine, which he attaches to a hook. He claims that if Kazuo can cross the room (pulling his entire intestine out of his body in the process) and cut Aki's ropes with a pair of scissors, he will free them both. Kazuo reaches Aki, but repeatedly tries and fails to cut her ropes, as they have a thick metal wire running through them. He eventually faints from blood loss before he can complete the task.

Aki begins insulting the man, surmising that a severe lack of romantic or sexual experience is the reason for his sadistic tendencies and belittling his unpleasant odor. Angered, the man stabs her in the stomach before decapitating her with the chainsaw. When her head lands on his neck, she bites him with her final breath. Kazuo uses the last of his strength to stab the man in the foot with the scissors before the couple dies facing each other. The man, who survived the attack despite losing his ability to walk properly, gives the couple a traditional Japanese burial next to each other in a quiet forest, leaving the scissors on their tombs. Alone in his car, the man douses himself with perfume. A young woman walks by; the man spots her and grabs a hammer before moving to exit his car.

== Cast ==
- Tsugumi Nagasawa as Aki Miyashita
- Hiroaki Kawatsure as Kazuo Kojima
- Shigeo Ōsako as the unnamed doctor

== Release ==
The British Board of Film Classification has refused to issue an 18 certificate to the unrated version of the film, banning its release in the United Kingdom. BBFC director David Cook explained "Unlike other recent 'torture' themed horror works, such as the Saw and Hostel series, Grotesque features minimal narrative or character development and presents the audience with little more than an unrelenting and escalating scenario of humiliation, brutality and sadism. In spite of a vestigial attempt to 'explain' the killer's motivations at the very end of the film, the chief pleasure on offer is not related to understanding the motivations of any of the central characters. Rather, the chief pleasure on offer seems to be wallowing in the spectacle of sadism (including sexual sadism) for its own sake".

The film's director and screenwriter, Kōji Shiraishi, responded that he was "delighted and flattered by this most expected reaction from the faraway country, since the film is an honest conscientious work, made sure to upset the so-called moralists."

== Home media ==
The reception in Japan was initially less controversial, but after the notoriety of the UK ban, Amazon Japan decided to remove the DVD of Grotesque from its website. Of note is that CDJapan, the international version of the Japanese retailer Neowing, does not sell the DVD since the controversy; although it is still readily available to Japanese residents via Neowing.

The film was released on DVD in Austria and the Netherlands on July 31. The DVD is a special edition limited to 1,000 copies. The DVD only contains German and Japanese language tracks and is only available in online stores related to the genre.

The film was released on a DVD/Blu-ray in the United States by Media Blasters on October 12, 2010.

Ace Deuce would also release a very limited "rental" version only available for purchase in Japan, this version edits a lot of the more gory scenes out in favor of alternate shots, as well as a different ending, this version of the movie is extremely rare.

== Reception ==
Derek Elley of Variety had a lukewarm response to Grotesque, offering kudos to aspects such as the acting and the production values, while criticizing others such as the inconsistent special effects, and opining that the "ridiculous" finale "blows any built-up tension and generates chuckles more than anything else". Horror News praised the film, opening its review with, "Grotesque is really a mix of emotions. Brilliant, disgusting, well written, sadistic and painful to your senses beyond belief" and concluding that it was "a solid effort" that deserves "an A for a great and outrageous ending".

== See also ==
- List of banned films
