= Deadbeat at Dawn =

- Theatrical release poster
- Directed by: Jim Van Bebber
- Written by: Jim Van Bebber
- Produced by: Michael King
- Starring: Jim Van Bebber; Paul Harper; Megan Murphy; Marc Pitman
- Cinematography: Michael King
- Edited by: Jim Van Bebber
- Music by: A-OK; Ned Folkerth
- Production company: Smodeus Productions Inc.
- Release date: 18 November 1988 (Dayton, Ohio)
- Running time: 81 minutes
- Country: United States

Deadbeat at Dawn is a 1988 splatter crime film written and directed by Jim Van Bebber and starring Paul Harper, Megan Murphy, and Marc Pitman. The film depicts a street gang leader setting out for revenge against a rival street gang. It was filmed in Dayton, Ohio.

== Plot ==
The main character is Goose (Van Bebber). Goose is leader of "The Ravens", a street gang located in Dayton, Ohio. The Ravens have an ongoing feud with "The Spiders", led by a sadistic goon called Danny (Paul Harper). Goose loves the criminal life, but when his girlfriend Christie (Megan Murphy) threatens to leave him, he quits the Ravens. First, he goes on one last drug deal to get money to fund a new life with Christie. While he is gone, two Spiders break into Goose's apartment, killing Christie in the process. When Goose finds her body, he feeds her corpse to a trash compactor and then moves in with his Vietnam Veteran junkie father. He then gets drunk at a bar.

The Ravens organise a hit and coerce Goose into joining them in a plot to steal $100,000 cash from the federal government. For this and a follow-up deal, they agree to put aside their differences with the Spiders and agree to meet at a place where nobody is armed in order to carry out the transaction safely. Goose plans on taking the money directly from the drop and secretly arms himself—unbeknownst to him, the Spiders were laying a trap. The Ravens are killed but Goose manages to escape with the money, calling Christie's sister he arranges a meetup near a freight train station in order to give her the money, lying to her by saying her sister is still alive. As he makes his way to the meeting point he's spotted by one of the members of the Spiders. As he waits for Christie's sister to arrive he falls asleep, awaking he finds himself cornered and a fight ensues.

The fight extends to the streets below whereby Christie's sister arrives and is threatened by one of the other gang members. Goose fights him off and kills him but in doing so is stabbed multiple times in the kidney and begins to lose a lot of blood. He greets Christie's sister and hands her the money, urging her to flee; upon her questioning he reveals that Christie is in fact dead. Walking away from her he begins to make his way into a well-populated street before collapsing onto the ground as sirens can be heard in the background.

== Cast ==
- Jim Van Bebber as Goose: Leader of the Ravens and Christie's boyfriend.
- Paul Harper as Danny: Leader of the Spiders. He is an abusive and misogynistic thug.
- Megan Murphy as Christie: Goose's girlfriend. She is into mysticism and threatens to leave Goose if he doesn't quit the Ravens.
- Marc Pitman as Bonecrusher: A member of the Spiders. He is a psychotic man, full of uncontrollable rage.
- Ric Walker as Keith: The Raven second-in-command, he takes over as leader when Goose quits.
- Charlie Goetz as Dad, Goose's father.

== Release ==
Deadbeat at Dawn was shown at The Dayton Movies theatre in Dayton, Ohio on November 18, 1988. After the film initial VHS release by Ketchum Video, Van Bebber spoke in 1991 that he was "trying to get out of that contract. They haven't spoken with us for over four months." and that he had "yet to see the first dollar from its "sale"." Van Bebber later spoke on the home video releases of the film in 2018, stating that "We had to learn the hard way by working with people who didn't pan out or would rip us off. There was a distributor in New York where all our contracts turned to dust. Then there was the VHS deal which was a glimpse into how I would be treated with the next release on DVD, which was a total lack of any business decorum. It was frustrating." Synapse Films released Deadbeat at Dawn in 1999. The film was included in the release of the compilation Visions of Hell: The Films of Jim VanBebber in 2008 by Dark Sky Films, which Van Bebber found that the film "didn't get its proper respect until the Dark Sky release. I know other people might disagree, but they weren't on the business end of things. The Dark Sky box set brought a newer audience of the film and to me." Arrow Video released the film in 2019 on Blu-ray. Van Bebber commented on Arrow's release stating that the way the film was handled by Arrow "totally buries all of the other companies that have dealt with it in the past. They're treating it like it's an important film that needs to be respected. After all these years, that's vindication."

== Reception ==
In a contemporary review, Terry Lawson gave the film a rating of two out of five stars, referring to the film as "part action film, part horror pastiche, part home movie and all pure, raw energy" stating it was "garish, violent and purposely absurd little action thriller" which had "about twice the impact of most films of its kind - whatever that kind might be." Lawson concluded that Van Bebber and "specifically photographer Mike King" have "an inherent understanding of how movies work: Deadbeat at Dawn may be crude and silly and even incoherent at times, but it has an undeniable vitality and a snotty sense of style: It is never dull."

From retrospective reviews, Nick Pinkerton of Sight & Sound described the film as an "incredible no-budget mend-and-make ingenuity" that was as "kinetic, visceral, and palpably dangerous as anything then coming out of Hong Kong." Jason Buchanan of AllMovie referred to the film as a "prime example of creativity and enthusiasm picking up where budget and other resources fall short", calling the film a "pleasantly surprising mini-masterpiece of gritty urban nightmares. Viewers may initially chuckle at how many times van Bebber's name appears in the credits, attached to virtually every component of the film's production from editing to special effects, but they will come to appreciate the sometimes subtle (and other times less so) creative touches that he lends to the various aspects of the film". The review concluded that it was "unclear at times whether the film is aiming to be completely serious and dramatic, or tongue in cheek and over the top, though the answer likely falls somewhere in between."

== Bibliography ==
- Allon, Yoram; Cullen, Del; Patterson, Hannah (2000). The Wallflower Critical Guide to Contemporary North American Directors. Wallflower. ISBN 978-1-903364-09-3.
- Kane, Jone (2000). The Phantom of the Movies' Videoscope: The Ultimate Guide to the Latest, Greatest, and Weirdest Genre Videos. Three Rivers Press. ISBN 978-0-8129-3149-5.
- Kerekes, David; Slater, David (March 7, 2024). Cannibal Error: Anti-Film Propaganda and the 'Video Nasties' Panic of the 1980s. SCB Distributors. ISBN 978-1-909394-96-4.
- Konow, David (1998). Schlock-o-rama: The Films of Al Adamson. Lone Eagle Publishing. ISBN 978-1-58065-001-4.
- Puchalski, Steven (2002). Slimetime: A Guide to Sleazy, Mindless Movies. Headpress/Critical Vision. ISBN 978-1-900486-21-7.
- Stine, Scott (September 18, 2015). The Gorehound's Guide to Splatter Films of the 1980s. McFarland & Company. ISBN 978-1-4766-1132-7.
- Szpunar, John (October 8, 2013). Xerox Ferox: The Wild World of the Horror Film Fanzine. SCB Distributors. ISBN 978-1-909394-11-7.
- VanBebber, Jim (1998). Charlie's Family: An Illustrated Screenplay to the Film. Creation Books. ISBN 978-1-871592-94-8.
