= Robin Duval =

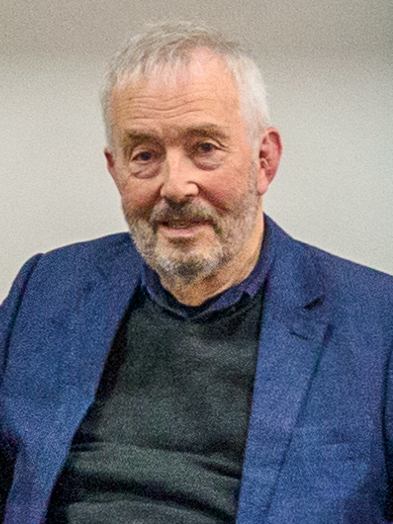
Duval in 2021

Robin Arthur Philip Duval CBE (born 1941) was Director of the British Board of Film Classification (the "Film Censor") from 1999 to 2004.

Duval was educated at King Edward's School, Birmingham before reading history at University College London (UCL) during which he took part in the first series of University Challenge. He subsequently studied at the University of Michigan as a Fulbright Scholar. He began his career in BBC radio and as a TV advertisement writer and producer at J. Walter Thompson. In 1968 he joined the Central Office of Information (COI), eventually becoming their Head of Television and Film Production. He then became Deputy Director of Programmes at the Independent Television Commission before succeeding James Ferman as Director of the BBFC in 1999.

His directorship was marked by his 2000 decision no longer to cut films for adults (unless they broke criminal law). He also abolished the '12' age-based rating for cinema, replacing it with an advisory '12A' rating.

On retirement from the BBFC, he was appointed Commander of the Order of the British Empire (CBE) in the 2005 New Years Honours for services to the film industry. Duval was succeeded by David Cooke.

In his personal life, Duval's interests include attending concerts, operas and football matches. He is married with four daughters.

Since he retired from the BBFC he has become a novelist, writing political thrillers set against an international backdrop. Bear in the Woods was published in 2010, its follow-up Below the Thunder in 2013 and Not Single Spies in 2015. However his latest novel, Going to America, published in 2021, explores a quite different theme: the conflict between age and youth as an old and once famous actor takes his granddaughter on the trip of a lifetime to New Orleans.
