= 18 (British Board of Film Classification) =

Given to films with content deemed suitable only for adults

BBFC 18 category symbol used since 2019

The 18 certificate is issued by the British Board of Film Classification (BBFC), to state that in its opinion, a film, video recording, or game is suitable only for persons aged 18 years and over. It recommends that no one below that age should be admitted to view a film with an 18 certificate in a cinema, and that 18-rated video recordings should not be sold or rented to anyone below that age.

As with other British film certificates, the 18 certificate theoretically only has advisory power for films shown in public cinemas, with the ultimate say being held by local authorities. In practice, the local authorities tend to follow BBFC rulings in all but a few exceptional cases.

For video and game sales, the BBFC rulings have statutory power, as under the terms of the Video Recordings Act 1984 all videos sold or distributed within the UK must be classified by the BBFC, unless they fall into one of a number of exempt categories. Unclassified recordings which are not exempt cannot legally be sold, regardless of content.

== History ==
18 certificate icon used by the BBFC from 2002 until 2019

The 18 certificate was created in 1982 as the successor of the previous X certificate, which in turn was the successor of the H certificate (with H standing for "horror").

Typical reasons for restricting films to the 18 category have included hard drug use, supernatural horror, sexually explicit scenes, graphic violence, sadistic violence and sexual violence — the latter two of which have in the past led to a certificate not being issued at all, in effect banning the film in the UK.

It was only around the start of the 21st century that the censors passed films with explicit ("hardcore") sexual acts despite the 18 certificate (and the more restrictive R18 certificate) existing for many years.

== Sex and the 18 certificate ==
Until recently, works at 18 could not contain the depiction of actual sex acts, which more recently could only appear in films with an R18 certificate (when created in 1982 only simulated acts could be shown under an R18, but this was relaxed after legal challenges in 2000). Although the BBFC allowed the depiction of simulated sex scenes in 18 certificate films, actual sexual acts were still not allowed to be depicted in 18 certificate films until around 1999.

This precedent appears to have been set when the BBFC granted 18 certificates for films containing short scenes of unsimulated sex, such as Catherine Breillat's Romance (1999) and Patrice Chéreau's Intimacy (2001). In October 2004, a new precedent appeared to be set when the BBFC granted an 18 certificate for Michael Winterbottom's film 9 Songs, which featured a number of lengthy explicit scenes of unsimulated sex. This was followed by certificates for Shortbus and Destricted. In the statement justifying the latter decision, it was stated that there is no limit to the number of images that can be considered to be justified.

In 2004, the board was also challenged by some pornographic video distributors to award 18 certificates to material that would otherwise be classified at R18. This could have greatly diminished the role of the R18 certificate, but their efforts failed. This means there continues to be a form of artistic merit test requiring the work to be judged non-pornographic, and the scenes in question "exceptionally justified by context" for a mainstream release.

In its 2009 report (available on its website), the BBFC updated its standards stating that:

"When it comes to sex in films for adults, the Board's policy is that explicit images of real sex should be confined to the 'R18' category, unless such images can be justified by their context. However, contextual justification is irrelevant if the primary purpose of the work is sexual arousal or stimulation (i.e. a sex work). Under the new Guidelines, the contextual justification for explicit images of real sex at '18' no longer needs to be 'exceptional'."

The main difference between this new policy and previous years' policies is that contextual justification for images of real sex no longer needs to be "exceptional" in an 18 rated work.

In its 2010 report (available on its website), the BBFC updated its standards again stating that:

"As in previous years, the Board's policy remains that explicit images of real sex should be confined to the 'R18' category unless such images can be justified by their context. Contextual justification, however, has less weight if the primary purpose of the work is sexual arousal or stimulation (i.e. a sex work)."

The main difference between this new policy and previous years' policies is that contextual justification for images of real sex is no longer irrelevant if the primary purpose of the work is sexual arousal or stimulation; instead, it merely reduces the amount of justification that context can provide.

In a sex work, any explicit and non-obscured sight of vaginal or anal penetration by any object whatsoever; any contact between the lips or tongue and genital/anal area; and ejaculation usually requires an R18 certificate. Any sight of a liquid resembling semen is also usually restricted to the R18 category, even if the ejaculation is not visible: images of liquid splashing onto faces, breasts or being swallowed have been cut from 18 certificate films.

The R18 versions contained these images unaltered. Further reasons for classifying a film at R18, as opposed to 18, include vigorous and/or extensive genital touching (brief genital touching may be passed "18"), implied triple penetration, extreme close-ups of spread female genitals or anuses (erections are now permissible in the 18 category, however), and certain fetish material, especially urination and potentially dangerous sadomasochistic activities. However, under the new 2010 guidelines, explicit images of real sex can be passed at 18 in a sex work provided there is exceptional justifying context.

== Violence, horror, and the 18 certificate ==
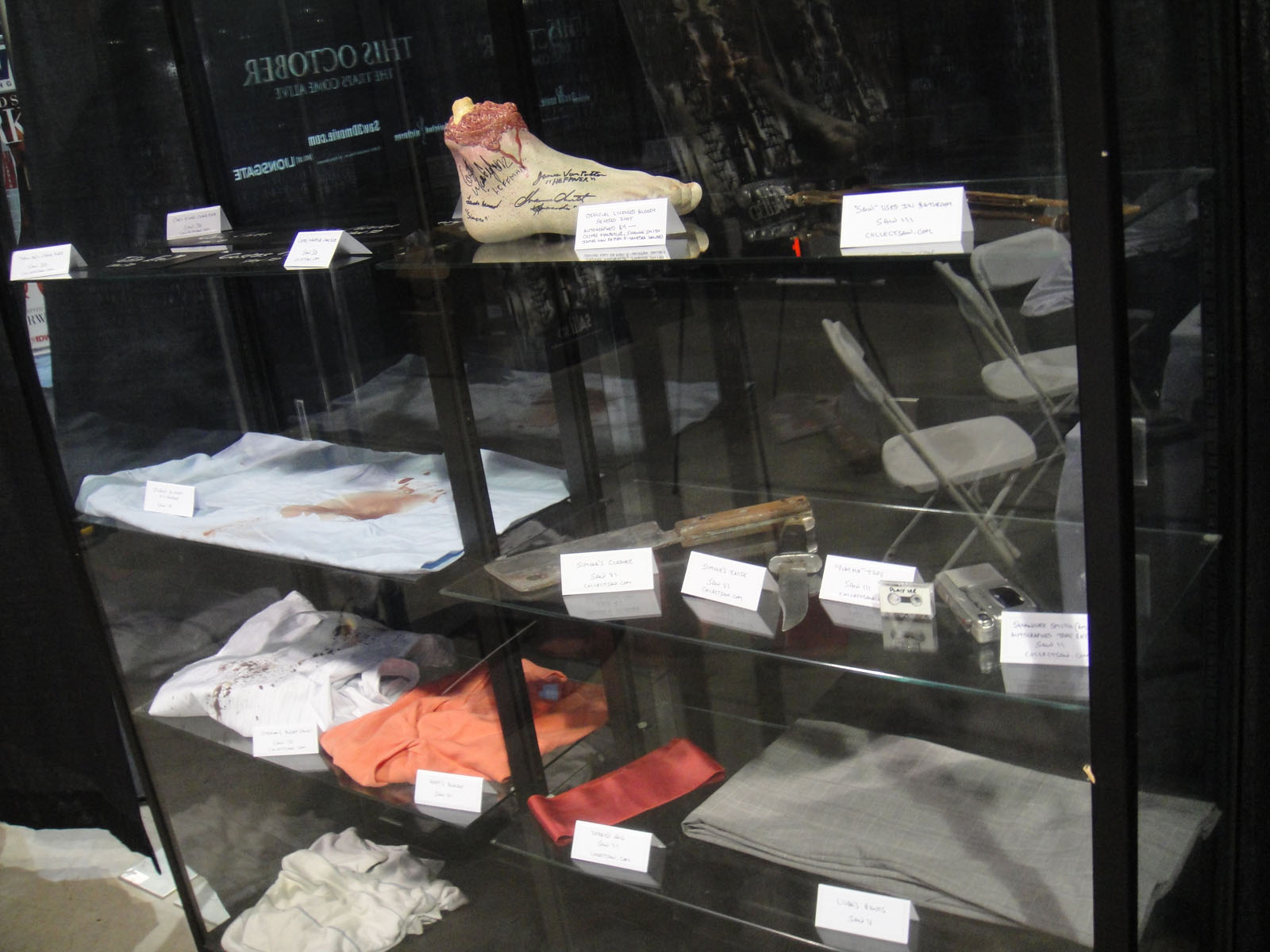
Extreme graphic violence, and violence that dwells on the infliction of pain and injury, as is frequently depicted in the Saw horror franchise, is restricted to the 18 category.

In the past, violence was one of the more problematic aspects when passing a film with an 18 certificate, whether it was sexualised or sadistic violence. Horror films were often the culprits for depicting graphic violence and this often resulted in criticism of the examiners. Particularly violent scenes must be removed before a certificate is awarded.

With the advent of home video, films that were cut in the cinemas could be released uncut on video. This led to a moral panic concerning "video nasties" as coined by tabloid newspapers.

The government passed the Video Recordings Act 1984 which meant all videos offered for sale must be assigned a classification agreed upon by an authority designated by the Home Office, which was the BBFC. As a result of this, many films previously cut for cinema (such as The Evil Dead and Dawn of the Dead) had to be cut further in order to get a legal release on video.

In recent times, the BBFC has been more lenient towards sadistic and/or gruesome violence, and so former 'video nasties' have since passed uncut. Current concerns include content such as "any detailed portrayal of violent or dangerous acts which is likely to promote the activity", and sexualised violence.

The BBFC also takes into account whether the scenes are considered to glamourise sexual assault. In 2002, the board passed Gaspar Noé's Irréversible without any cuts. It said that the rape depicted in the film does not contain any explicit sexual images and is not designed to titillate. Less than a month later, Takashi Miike's Ichi the Killer had to be cut by three minutes and twenty-five seconds due to sexual violence. In this case, the scenes were felt to be potentially glamourising assault.

Another example of cuts for sexual violence, as well as child protection issues, is A Serbian Film, a horror film about a retired porn star lured back into performing. Over four minutes of cuts were required, primarily to remove material involving children in sexual and sexually violent scenarios. The initially banned 1980 Italian film Cannibal Holocaust had five minutes and forty-four seconds of cuts to scenes of sexual violence and actual animal cruelty on its first submission in 2001, reduced to only a single cut of three seconds in 2011.

Violence that dwells on the infliction of pain or injury is considered by the BBFC to exceed what is considered acceptable in the lower 15 category and is likely to result in an 18 certificate. The strongest graphic violence is also restricted to the 18 category.

References or scenes of suicide or dangerous stunts, which can be easily imitated by youth, can lead to a DVD being given an 18 certificate. Volume 3 of the anime Paranoia Agent (which is normally rated 12 or 15) is rated 18 because of suicide references and violence, mostly in the episode "Happy Family Planning", which made light of suicide and featured a scene of someone pretending to hang himself, a scene which was edited by the BBFC until the series was released uncut on Blu-ray in 2021.

An episode of House titled "Under My Skin" became the first and only one to be passed with an 18 certificate due to scenes depicting a suicide technique that can easily be imitated in real life. Most of the Jackass films are also given an 18 certificate because of dangerous and imitable stunts.

Horror film distributors may consider an 18 rating preferable to the lower 15 category, as the rating is an indicator of the strength of the film's content.

== See also ==
- Motion picture rating system
- Obscene Publications Act
- R18 certificate, a more restrictive certificate used in the United Kingdom
- X certificate
