= Video Appeals Committee =

The Video Appeals Committee (VAC) is a body set up by the United Kingdom's Video Recordings Act. If a video or video-game distributor's work is rejected by the British Board of Film Classification (BBFC), preventing it from being legally sold in the UK, the distributor can appeal to the VAC, which has the power to order the BBFC to reverse its decision and to grant a certificate to the disputed work. The BBFC has the option of challenging the VAC's decision through the courts using judicial review.

The members of the VAC are chosen by the BBFC, but it is otherwise independent of the BBFC and the home secretary.
