= Video Recordings Act 2010 =

Act of the Parliament of the United Kingdom

Video Recordings Act 2010 (Note: Section 2(1).)
- Act of Parliament
- Parliament of the United Kingdom
- Long title: An Act to repeal and revive provisions of the Video Recordings Act 1984.
- Citation: 2010 c. 1
- Introduced by: Siôn Simon, Parliamentary Under-Secretary for Creative Industries (Commons); Lord Davies of Oldham (Lords)
- Territorial extent: England and Wales; Scotland; Northern Ireland; (Note: Section 2(3).)

Dates
- Royal assent: 21 January 2010
- Commencement: 21 January 2010 (Note: Section 2(2).)
Other legislation
Amends	Video Recordings Act 1984

Status: Current legislation

History of passage through Parliament

Text of statute as originally enacted

Revised text of statute as amended

The Video Recordings Act 2010 (c. 1) is an act of the Parliament of the United Kingdom that received royal assent on 21 January 2010. The Act repealed and then brought back into force parts of the Video Recordings Act 1984 which related to the regulation of video recordings. The act was required because it was discovered in August 2009 that the European Commission had not been notified, in 1984, of the provisions of the act in accordance with the predecessor to Directive 98/34/EC (Note: 83/189/EEC) of the European Parliament and of the Council of 22 June 1998, which laid down a procedure for the provision of information in the field of technical standards and regulations. The provisions of the act, which related to video classification and distribution in the United Kingdom, were unenforceable until the EC had been correctly notified of the technical standards.

== Passage ==
The act was debated by the House of Commons in just one day on 6 January 2010. It was first presented (first reading) on 15 December 2009 and the second reading, committee stage and third reading all took place, one after the other, on 6 January.
