= Video Recordings Act 1984 =

Act of the Parliament of the United Kingdom

Video Recordings Act 1984 (Note: Section 23(1).)
- Act of Parliament
- Parliament of the United Kingdom
- Long title: An Act to make provision for regulating the distribution of video recordings and for connected purposes.
- Citation: 1984 c. 39
- Introduced by: Graham Bright MP (Commons)
- Territorial extent: United Kingdom (Note: Section 23(3).)

Dates
- Royal assent: 12 July 1984
- Commencement: various (Note: Section 23(2).)
- Repealed: 21 January 2010 (but immediately brought back)
Other legislation
Amended by	Cinemas Act 1985; Criminal Justice Act 1988; Broadcasting Act 1990; Video Recordings Act 1993; Statute Law (Repeals) Act 1993; Chiropractors Act 1994; Criminal Justice and Public Order Act 1994; Criminal Procedure (Consequential Provisions) (Scotland) Act 1995; Licensing Act 2003; National Health Service (Consequential Provisions) Act 2006; Digital Economy Act 2010; Consumer Rights Act 2015; Justice Act (Northern Ireland) 2015; Children and Social Work Act 2017; Judicial Review and Courts Act 2022
Repealed by	Video Recordings Act 2010 (repealed and immediately brought back the 1984 act)

Status: Partially repealed

Text of statute as originally enacted

Revised text of statute as amended

Text of the Video Recordings Act 1984 as in force today (including any amendments) within the United Kingdom, from legislation.gov.uk.

The Video Recordings Act 1984 (c. 39) is an act of the Parliament of the United Kingdom that was passed in 1984. It states that commercial video recordings offered for sale or for hire within the UK must carry a classification that has been agreed upon by an authority designated by the Home Office. The British Board of Film Classification (BBFC), which had been instrumental in the certification of motion pictures since 1912, was designated as the classifying authority in 1985. Works are classified by the BBFC under an age-rated system (see motion picture rating systems); it is an offence under the act to supply video works to individuals who are (or appear to be) under the age of the classification designated. Works that are refused classification cannot, under the act, be legally sold or supplied to anyone of any age unless it is educational, or to do with a sport, religion or music and does not depict violence, sex or incite a criminal offence. The BBFC may also require cuts to be made, either to receive a certain age rating, or to be allowed a classification at all.

== History ==
=== Leadup ===
The act was a legislative reaction to a moral panic concerning "video nasties" that was sparked by tabloid newspapers in Britain during 1982 and 1983.

=== Early history and follow-ups ===
Sport, music, religious, and educational works are exempt from classification under the act. Exemption may be forfeited if the work depicts excessive human sexual activity or acts of force or restraint associated with such activity, mutilation or torture of humans or animals, human genital organs or urinary or excretory functions, or techniques likely to be useful in the perpetration of criminal acts or illicit activity.

The Act was accompanied by the Video Recordings (Labelling) Regulations 1985, governing the display of certificates awarded by the BBFC on published recordings.

The act was amended in the Video Recordings Act 1993 but underwent no significant changes. It was amended again in the Criminal Justice and Public Order Act 1994 to deal with the growing issue of "video violence". In addition, the amendment extended the definition of a video recording to any device capable of storing electronic data, which invariably includes works available on DVD as well as CD and CD-ROM, although the amendment exempts video games (except if they depict criminal activity which is likely to any significant extent to stimulate or encourage the commission of offences). The current labelling regulations are The Video Recordings (Labelling) Regulations 2012.

=== Discovery of loophole and replacement ===
In August 2009 it was discovered that the act was unenforceable as the European Commission was not notified about it, as required by Directive 83/189 (see now Directive 98/34). Directive 83/189 had to be implemented by 31 March 1984 (12 months after its notification to the member states). Until this situation was rectified, it was legal to sell and supply unclassified videos and computer games, although many retailers had agreed to observe the regulations voluntarily. Then pending prosecutions under the act were abandoned, but the government claimed that past convictions could not be challenged. The government's view was upheld in 2010 when two appeals against earlier convictions were dismissed.

In December 2009 the government introduced new legislation, the Video Recordings Act 2010, which repealed and immediately revived the Video Recordings Act 1984, after the required notification was provided to the European Commission in October 2009. This legislation, which was enacted under the "fast-track" procedure (and therefore was expedited through Parliament), made the 1984 Act enforceable once again, as well as allowing it to be amended by the Digital Economy Act 2010. In December 2014 streaming and on-demand services were brought under the remit of this act via the Audiovisual Media Services Regulations 2014.

== See also ==
- Video Appeals Committee
- Manhunt 2
- Grotesque, Japanese horror film that was banned from sale outright in the United Kingdom after the BBFC refused to rate it 18
