= A Serbian Documentary =

- Directed by: Stephen Biro
- Written by: Stephen Biro; Caleb Emerson
- Produced by: Stephen Biro; Srđan Spasojević
- Cinematography: Nemanja Jovanov
- Edited by: Caleb Emerson
- Music by: Sky Wikluh
- Production companies: Unearthed Films; Contra Film
- Release date: 22 August 2025 (FrightFest)
- Running time: 83 minutes
- Country: United States
- Language: English

A Serbian Documentary is a 2025 documentary film directed by Stephen Biro about the making of, and controversy surrounding, the 2010 Serbian horror film A Serbian Film. The documentary incorporates more than 162 hours of behind-the-scenes footage and new interviews with members of the original film's cast and crew. It was written by Biro and Caleb Emerson.

The film had its world premiere at the FrightFest festival in London on 22 August 2025, where it was screened on the festival's main screen at the ODEON Luxe Leicester Square.

== Production ==
A Serbian Documentary examines the creation of A Serbian Film, including the production's practical effects, the experiences of its cast and crew, and the filmmakers' stated artistic intentions. It also addresses the film's controversy, censorship history and its removal from the FrightFest programme in 2010.

Directed by Stephen Biro and written by Biro and Caleb Emerson, the documentary draws from more than 162 hours of exclusive behind-the-scenes footage and interviews with 14 members of the original film's team. The interviewed participants include director and co-writer Srđan Spasojević, co-writer Aleksandar Radivojević, cinematographer Nemanja Jovanov, and actors Srđan Todorović, Sergej Trifunović, Jelena Gavrilović, Katarina Zutić, Slobodan Beštić and Lena Bogdanović.

A Serbian Documentary was produced by Biro's Unearthed Films in association with Contra Film.

== Release ==
A Serbian Documentary was selected for the 2025 edition of FrightFest in London. The film's world premiere took place on Friday 22 August 2025 on the festival's main screen at ODEON Luxe Leicester Square. Biro attended the screening as a guest.

== Reception ==
Critical reaction to A Serbian Documentary was mixed, with reviewers generally agreeing that the documentary provides extensive behind-the-scenes access while differing over its treatment of the original film's controversy.

Martin Unsworth of Starburst praised the documentary's interviews and behind-the-scenes material, particularly its account of the production and special-effects work, while noting that it may primarily appeal to people already interested in A Serbian Film. Russell Bailey of The Hollywood News similarly praised the breadth of the interviews and production footage, but criticised what he regarded as the documentary's tendency to dismiss critics of the original film and concluded that it would be most appealing to dedicated fans.

Darren Gaskell of Love Horror gave the film 3 out of 5 stars. He praised the behind-the-scenes material and discussion of the production process but felt that the documentary did not substantially expand on the controversy surrounding A Serbian Film. UpcomingHorrorMovies gave the documentary a 9/10 rating and praised its extensive use of behind-the-scenes footage and interviews with members of the original production.

Other reviews were more critical of the documentary's perspective. James Rodrigues of The Geek Show described it as a "one-sided" examination, arguing that it concentrates heavily on the perspectives of the filmmakers and cast while giving less attention to opposing reactions to A Serbian Film. Terry Sherwood of Bloody Flicks found the documentary both informative and frustrating, praising the behind-the-scenes footage but arguing that it did not go deeply enough into the wider controversy surrounding the original film.

Arash Nahandian of Gazettely similarly argued that the documentary was heavily focused on the filmmakers' own defence of A Serbian Film and lacked dissenting viewpoints, while praising its behind-the-scenes access and explanation of the technical production of the original film. Christine Burnham of PopHorror, by contrast, gave the documentary a strongly positive review and recommended it to viewers interested in understanding the original film and its production.
