= Atroz =

- DVD cover
- Directed by: Lex Ortega
- Written by: Lex Ortega; Sergio Tello
- Based on: Atroz by Lex Ortega
- Produced by: Abigail Bonilla
- Starring: Lex Ortega; Julio Rivera; Carlos Valencia; Florencia Ríos; Carlos Padilla; Dana Karvelas
- Cinematography: Luis García
- Edited by: Lex Ortega; Elena Morales; Mario Ivan Ponton
- Production company: Cinenauta
- Distributed by: Unearthed Films
- Release date: 2015
- Running time: 75 minutes
- Country: Mexico
- Language: Spanish

Atroz (English: Atrocious) is a 2015 Mexican extreme horror film directed by Lex Ortega and written by Ortega and Sergio Tello. The film stars Julio Rivera, Carlos Valencia, and Ortega. It is based on Ortega's short film of the same name and follows police commander Juárez as he investigates a series of videotapes connected to two serial killers. The film gained notoriety for its graphic depictions of violence, torture and sexual brutality and explores themes of abuse, machismo and gender repression.

== Plot ==
Commissioner Juárez is called to a fatal car accident. The two drivers, Goyo and Gordo, have been arrested. Juárez doesn't wait for the forensic team and retrieves a video from the car's glove compartment. The video shows the two drivers brutally torturing a transvestite to death. Juárez orders the two murderers to be tortured in order to find out the location of the crime.

At the crime scene, officers discover evidence of another murder, as well as a videotape depicting Goyo's youth. Goyo was abused and humiliated by his parents after they discovered he was gay. He and his sister Daniela kill his parents. However, after the murders, he also attempts to kill his sister.

Juárez first tells Goyo that his partner Gordo committed suicide. He then explains that the transvestite was his brother and also that Daniela isn't dead at all. He leads her into the interrogation room and unlocks her handcuffs.

== Cast ==
- Lex Ortega as Goyo
- Julio Rivera as Dax "Gordo"
- Carlos Valencia as Juárez
- Florencia Ríos
- Carlos Padilla
- Aleyda Gallardo
- Dana Karvelas as Esmeralda
- Patricia Leih
- Lauretter Flores
- Orlando Moguel as Felix
- Miquel Nava
- David Aboussafy

== Production ==
Development on Atroz began in 2014 when director Lex Ortega and producer Abigail Bonilla launched a crowdfunding campaign to complete the feature after filming approximately 35 minutes of footage. The campaign ultimately exceeded its original funding goal. The film was developed from Ortega's earlier short films, including Atroz, was released in 2012, which had previously screened on the festival circuit and was noted for its graphic violence and explicit content.

Principal photography began on February 20, 2015 and concluded on March 2, 2015.

== Reception ==
Atroz received mixed to positive reviews, with frequently emphasizing the film's brutality and extreme content. ScreenAnarchy described the film as "one of the most brutal horror films" seen by the reviewer and compared its potential notoriety to A Serbian Film, while also highlighting its themes concerning violence and gender identity. Writing for Dread Central, Mikey Peralta Jr. described the film as "Mexico's most violent film" and interpreted it as a critique of machismo culture and toxic masculinity.

Barbara Torretti of Dark Veins praised the screenplay structure, characterization and narrative use of recovered videotapes, considering it a notable entry in extreme cinema. Horror Society gave the film a mixed review, praising its practical effects and graphic violence while criticizing the narrative structure and performances.
