= Dead Fury =

- DVD cover art
- Directed by: Frank Sudol
- Written by: Frank Sudol
- Produced by: Frank Sudol
- Starring: Frank Sudol
- Cinematography: Frank Sudol
- Edited by: Frank Sudol
- Music by: Frank Sudol
- Production company: BlackArro Productions
- Distributed by: Unearthed Films (United States); Horizon Motion Pictures (International)
- Release dates: April 9, 2008 (Philadelphia Film Festival); August 5, 2008 (DVD premiere)
- Running time: 82 minutes
- Country: United States
- Language: English

Dead Fury is a 2008 American adult animated comedy horror parody film written and directed by Frank Sudol, with Sudol also doing all animation, music, and voice characterizations. The film debuted at the Philadelphia Film Festival April 9, 2008, and was released on DVD on August 5, 2008, through Unearthed Films.

== Plot ==
Max, Pop, Jen and Jake are deer hunting out of season. Earlier, a hiker had found an ancient book of spells and after reading a few lines had turned into a demon. Hearing noise in the brush, the group thinks they have found a deer, only to discover it is the transformed hiker. Fearful, the groups shoots at the demon and takes refuge in a nearby cabin. As more and more zombie-fied creatures attack the group, they use every implement available to defend themselves. As the group begins to get possessed one by one only Max remains and he must fight for his live against the zombies and a family of freaks.

== Release ==
The DVD extras include 40 minutes of excluded storyboards, deleted and extended scenes, the Making of Dead Fury where Sudol narrates his use of Photoshop to create the film and its characters, a slide show of the original story art, a full commentary track where the filmmaker shares observations about his work and inspirations, as well as a gallery that includes trailers for City of Rott, Dead Fury, Rock & Rule, Junk, and Frankenhooker,

== Critical reception ==
DVD Talk stated that the film "is quite literally a one-man show". Described as a "crudely animated tale", they stated that the film "is a very interesting curiosity" better suited to being a 25-minute short. Film Threat panned the film, calling it "shamelessly cartoonish". Movie Cynics, while they praised Sudol for his work on City of Rott, judged Dead Fury interesting but less successful. Philadelphia City Paper referred to the film's length as "excruciating" and made note that the film's flaws included production values that "would barely pass muster on YouTube", a story concept that seemed "borrowed ideas seemingly made in an afternoon in between Xbox games", and juvenile humor "penned at a sixth-grade reading level." On the other hand, Dread Central found no flaws and wrote that it "not only remains on top of its game, but it outdoes City of Rott at every turn!" Fatally Yours referred to Dead Fury as a "leaner, meaner movie" when compared to City of Rott, and wrote that it has more gore and humor in a "tighter and a lot more focused plot."
