= When Black Birds Fly =

2015 film by James Creamer

- Directed by: James "Jimmy ScreamerClauz" Creamer
- Written by: Jimmy ScreamerClauz
- Produced by: Jimmy ScreamerClauz; Ruby Larocca
- Edited by: Jimmy ScreamerClauz
- Music by: M. dot Strange; Flyface; Jimmy ScreamerClauz; Swift Treweeke
- Production company: Draconian Films
- Distributed by: Bag Monster
- Release dates: November 13, 2015 (Housecore); January 15, 2016
- Running time: 124 minutes
- Country: United States
- Language: English

When Black Birds Fly is a 2015 American adult animated surrealist horror film written, directed, animated, edited and scored by James "Jimmy ScreamerClauz" Creamer, the director of Where the Dead Go to Die, and released by Bag Monster and MVD on January 15, 2016. The film had its official premiere on November 13, 2015 at Phil Anselmo's Housecore Horror Film Festival in San Antonio, Texas and given an award for Best Animated Film

== Plot summary ==
Heaven is a beautiful, clean suburban paradise. Every block is populated by lush trees and lovely row homes. People are free to roam and do whatever they please, as long as they follow one simple rule: DO NOT communicate with "The Evil One" that dwells on the other side of a giant wall that circles the town, which is under 24-hour surveillance by a team of soldiers wearing monstrous-looking gas masks. The ruler of the town is a man named Caine, who plasters images of himself all around town, insisting that his citizens trust and love him. A small child becomes obsessed with the seemingly increasing flocks of black birds that populate the town. One day after chasing one he discovers a talking cat with a broken leg, who begs Marius and his classmate Eden to crawl through a hole in the wall to help her. The kids decide to do it and she repays them by introducing them to a brightly-colored fruit that grows wildly on the other side of the wall. After consuming it the cat brings them to meet the Evil One, who attempts to teach them the forbidden knowledge that Caine is hiding from them all.

== Cast ==
- J.D. Brown as Daryl
- Brandon Slagle as Caine
- Devanny Pinn as The Evil One
- David Firth as Corvus
- Victor Bonacore as Marius
- Ruby Larocca as Dotty
- Erin Russ as Eden
- Erika Smith as Norma
- Adam Brooks as Various Citizens
- William Hellfire as Mr. Apple
- Manoush as Kitty
- M. dot Strange as The Messenger
- Sean Murray as Reverend
- Rodger Fischer as OSWA Soldiers
- Rakel Musicbox as False Evil One
- Tanner Summerset as Uncle T
- Mad Dashiell as Various Citizens
- Sarah Valentine as Lollipop
- nyka TV as Various Citizens (credited as Nykolai Nightstar)
