= Operation Blood Hunt =

2024 action horror film by Louis Mandylor

- Official release poster
- Directed by: Louis Mandylor
- Written by: Brandon Slagle
- Produced by: Daemon Hillin
- Starring: Quinton Jackson; Louis Mandylor; Jonathan Rhys Meyers; Sonia Couling
- Cinematography: Niccolo De La Fere
- Edited by: Austin Nordell
- Production companies: BGG Capital; Benetone Hillin Entertainment
- Distributed by: Film Bridge International; Quiver Distribution
- Release date: October 4, 2024 (United States)
- Running time: 93 minutes
- Countries: Thailand; United States
- Language: English

Operation Blood Hunt is a 2024 Thai-American war action horror film written by Brandon Slagle and directed by Louis Mandylor. It stars Quinton Jackson, Louis Mandylor, Jonathan Rhys Meyers and Sonia Couling. The film is about a group of military that investigate the disappearance of the marine units who assigned to the remote part of South Pacific Island.

== Plot ==
The plot of the film is as follows:

In 1944, as World War II ravages the globe, a mysterious silence falls over a cluster of U.S. Marine outposts in the South Pacific. Communications have ceased. No survivors. No answers. The military, desperate and rattled, reaches out to a man who straddles two worlds, Reverend Alexander Conte, an occult expert with a haunted past and "fists like stone". He has no love for God anymore, but he's still fluent in scripture and ancient curses.

The military drops Conte onto a jungle island with a handpicked team of misfits and outcasts: Richter, a mercenary; Elkins, a flamethrower-loving maniac; Ramirez, a Catholic zealot; Dr. Mallory, a frail but brilliant occult historian; and Corporal Dax, the only survivor from a previous unit, now half-crazed.

They arrive under overcast skies, the island oppressively quiet. There are no birds, no insects only the occasional breeze stirring the foliage. As they move deeper inland, the team finds a Marine outpost, abandoned and smeared with gore. Blood coats the floor and walls like war paint. Severed limbs hang from ropes. One soldier gags at the sight of a Marine crucified upside down, his stomach hollowed out, the entrails twisted into a strange spiral on the floor beneath him. The word “WEREWOLVES” is scratched into a wall, each letter etched with a fingernail.

That night, the team sets up camp in a clearing. They rig silver shrapnel traps and UV flares, thinking they’re prepared. But nothing prepares them for the scream that rips through the dark Elkins is dragged from his foxhole in the blink of an eye. By the time the others reach him, all that's left is a steaming torso and a trail of blood disappearing into the brush. His head is found ten feet up in a tree, staring down, mouth frozen in a scream.

The creatures that attack are huge, bipedal, fur-covered nightmares with intelligent, hungry eyes. They don’t just kill, they hunt, they toy. Ramirez cuts down one with his machete, only for two more to leap from the trees and tear into him. He tries to recite the Lord’s Prayer as they rip open his ribcage and start feeding before he can finish the first line.

Desperate for answers, Conte leads the surviving squad members into the heart of the jungle, where they find Heirani, a woman of quiet strength and dark eyes. She explains the island’s cursed history how her ancestors made a pact with moon spirits during World War I, transforming warriors into guardians. But the curse twisted them. Now they live only to hunt, especially under the full moon, which bathes the jungle in blue death.

Soon after, they encounter Major Murphy, pale, poised, and centuries old. A vampire who once served with Conte’s father. Murphy reveals the true nature of their mission, it was never a rescue op. The military only wanted a distraction. Buried somewhere in the jungle is Yamashita's gold, a legendary fortune looted during the war. Conte’s squad was always meant to die so others could dig in peace.

Dr. Mallory, desperate to survive, reads from an old tome they found in the ruins of a temple, hoping to bind one of the werewolves. Instead, he triggers an ancient incantation that enrages the pack. He’s swarmed and devoured as he screams apologies to no one. His bones are left glistening in the firelight.

Conte’s world fractures further when he discovers that the alpha werewolf is his own father, thought to be long dead. Years ago, his father came on a similar mission, tried to use the curse to protect himself, and never returned. Now, a beast with glowing eyes and a scar Conte recognizes from childhood leads the monstrous pack.

Beneath the island temple, Conte faces his father, wrestling with rage and grief. The fight is brutal, claws slash flesh, silver burns fur, and the echoes of old guilt swirl like smoke. Conte stabs him through the heart with a silver dagger etched with a prayer he barely remembers. As the alpha dies, it reverts to human form, whispering “I saved you once” with its last breath.

Murphy, knowing the military will cover everything up, elects to stay behind and destroy the temple. He sets off an explosion of UV bombs and sacred ash, smiling faintly as the flames consume him and the remaining beasts. Conte and Heirani escape to the shoreline, battered, burned, and changed.

Back on the mainland, Conte is debriefed by cold-eyed officials who tell him nothing was recovered no gold, no intel, no proof. He’s dismissed as a lunatic. But he knows the truth. As he lights a cigarette with trembling fingers, a shadowy man in desert robes appears, handing him a file. Inside are photos of mummies walking in Cairo, a Nazi relic pulsing with dark energy, and a new assignment. Conte sighs, pockets a silver bullet, and says, “Of course it’s not over.”

== Cast ==
- Quinton Jackson as Reverend Conte
- Louis Mandylor as Richter
- Jonathan Rhys Meyers as Murphy
- Sonia Couling as Heirani
- Myles Clohessy as Billy The Kid
- Gary Cairns as BlackJack
- Peter Dobson as Stone
- Chante Evans as Eklund
- Einar Haraldsson
- Maverick Kang Jr. as Ahrens
- Emma Lund as Christina
- Michael March as Adams
- Stratos Cristos Maygias as Tribal Chief / Alpha Werewolf
- Roc Monaco as Samuels
- Alejandra Norris as Francesca
- Ulf Pilblad as Pilot
- Tofan Pirani as Rico
- Melody Prapassorn as Torque
- Bear Williams as Jacobs
- Willy Zogo as Rev Father

== Production ==
The cast and crew shot the film in Bangkok, Thailand and the filming was wrapped in December 2022. Landon Gorman from BGG Capital, Rachvin Narula and Kulthep Narula from Benetone Films and Jackson will be the executive producers of the film.

== Release ==
Quiver Distribution acquired the North American rights of the film and released Direct-to-video on October 4, 2024. The film also released in Lionsgate Play on November 15, 2024 and in Tubi in February 2025.

== Reception ==
Neil Soans of The Times of India gave the film a 2.0 rating and wrote; Operation Blood Hunt tries to bring a fresh twist to the werewolf genre, but unfortunately, it stumbles in almost every area that matters. While the film makes some commendable choices, like relying on practical effects for its creatures–arguably its strongest feature–the execution is riddled with missteps.
