= Manoush =

French actress and singer

- Born: Marica Barandyai; 1973 (age 52–53); Saintes-Maries-de-la-Mer, France
- Other names: Cyanide Savior; Marica Barandaj
- Occupations: Actress, singer
- Years active: 1997–present
- Spouses: Sonyo Lakatos; Heyko Noah; Chris Vazquez (2006–2014)

Manoush (born 1973) is a French actress and singer.

== Biography ==
=== Early life ===
Manoush was born 1972 or 1973 as Manoush Barandaj or Manoush Barandyai in Saintes-Maries-de-la-Mer as the third child of a mother of French Sinti origin and a German-American father. She was raised in Haarlem, North Holland, Cologne, (Germany) and Biel, Switzerland. At the age of 18, Manoush began modelling, but her career stopped short at age 20 after a car accident left scars on her stomach and legs. She immigrated to the United States in the summer of 2006 and returned to Europe approximately in 2015

=== Movie career ===
Manoush pursued film in 1997. In 2000, she was offered the role of the "nymphomaniac" in Jean-Pierre Jeunet's Amélie, which opened many doors for her in the film and TV industry, as well as establishing her as a "bad girl". Manoush often gets credit as an action and horror actress or as a professional in roles which can be intense and difficult to play. In 2004 she played fighter Carda in Angel of Death 2, closely followed by Timo Rose's The Legend of Moonlight Mountain (2005), Marian Dora's Cannibal (2006), Timo Rose's Barricade (2007), and Andrey Iskanov's Philosophy of a Knife (2008). Manoush won Best Supporting Actress in 2011 at the PollyGrind Film Festival in Las Vegas for her role as Olga in The Super.

=== Music career ===
She started out as a cyberpunk singer. Besides her acting and writing career, she worked as a singer in the band Cyanide Savior alongside her husband, Chris Vazquez.

In 2016 and 2017, she recorded two tracks with 1980s UK band Bronski Beat and US producer Man Parrish.

== Filmography ==
- 1997: M-Inspiration (Germany)
- 1998: Engagement (Germany)
- 1999: Time To Kill (unfinished Belgian movie)
- 1999: Einer geht noch (Germany)
- 2000: Amélie (France)
- 2001: Wolf im Schafspelz (Germany)
- 2002: Champion (Germany)
- 2002: Crossclub – Project Genesis (Germany)
- 2003: Hinter Schloss und Riegel (Germany)
- 2004: Angel of Death (Italy)
- 2004: Criminal Court: Temple of Lust (Germany)
- 2004: Moonlight Mountain (USA)
- 2005: Freunde für immer (Germany)
- 2006: Cannibal (Germany)
- 2006: Traumjob
- 2006: Barricade (USA/Germany)
- 2007: Fearmakers (USA)
- 2007: Zombie Reanimation (Germany)
- 2007: The Shrieking (USA)
- 2007/13: The Tourist a.k.a. Ingression (Russia)
- 2008: Philosophy of a Knife (Russia)
- 2008: Popular (Germany)
- 2008: The Turnpike Killer (USA)
- 2008: Craig (Denmark)
- 2008: Uncut! (USA)
- 2008: Necronos – Tower of Doom (Germany)
- 2008: Beast (Germany)
- 2009: Little Big Boy – The Rise and Fall of Jimmy Duncan (Denmark)
- 2009: La petite mort (France)
- 2009: Game Over (USA/Germany)
- 2009: Unrated (USA/Germany)
- 2009: Cats (Germany)
- 2009: Zombie Reanimation (Germany)
- 2010: 15 till Midnight (USA)
- 2010: Traveler (USA)
- 2010: Avantgarde (USA)
- 2010: Non Compos Mentis (USA)
- 2010: Ingression (Russia)
- 2011: The Super (USA)
- 2011: What's Your Poison (USA)
- 2012: When Black Birds Fly (USA)
- 2012: Survive (USA)
- 2012: Devil Moon (USA)
- 2013: Four of a Kind (Germany)
- 2013: Caedes Germany)
- 2013: Vengeance Doloreuse (France)
- 2014: In Fear Of (USA television series)
- 2014: Blood Valley: Seed's Revenge (USA)
- 2014: Sex, Blood and Fairy Tales (USA)
- 2014: Carpaneda (documentary) (USA)
- 2014: The Curse of Doctor Wolffenstein (Germany)
- 2014: Gefahr (TV) (Germany)
- 2015: Fenster zum Hof (TV) (Germany)
- 2015: The Sight (Germany)
- 2016: Blood on the Reel (US documentary)
- 2016: Bittersweet Revenge (Germany)
- 2016: Amor Kills (Germany)
- 2016: Andrey Iskanov's Visions of Suffering: Uroboros (Russia)
- 2016: Andrey Iskanov's Visions of Suffering (Final Director's Cut) (Russia)
- 2017: Night of the Magician (USA)
- 2017: Gelosia (Italy)
- 2017: Die Boten des Todes (Germany)
- 2017: Mampf (Germany)
- 2017: Unknown Israeli documentary film
- 2017: Bacillus F TV news documentary (as herself)
- 2018: Zombies from Sector 9 (Belgium)
- 2018: Stories of the Dead (Germany)
- 2018: Herr Berger sucht einen Sohn (Germany)
- 2018: Magid Atidot (Israel)
- 2019: Hour of the Witch (Germany)
- 2020: My Deadly Virus (Germany)
- 2021: H.P. Lovecraft's 'The Cats of Ulthar'
- 2023: La famille en bronze (France)
- 2025: White eyes

== Personal life ==
Manoush married her long-time boyfriend Chris Vasquez in 2006. They lived in New York, United States, and got divorced in 2014.
