= Emily O'Brien =

British actress

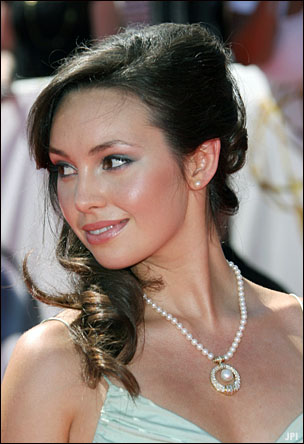
- O'Brien at the 2008 Daytime Emmy Awards
- Born: Emily O'Brien
- Occupation: Actress
- Years active: 2003–present

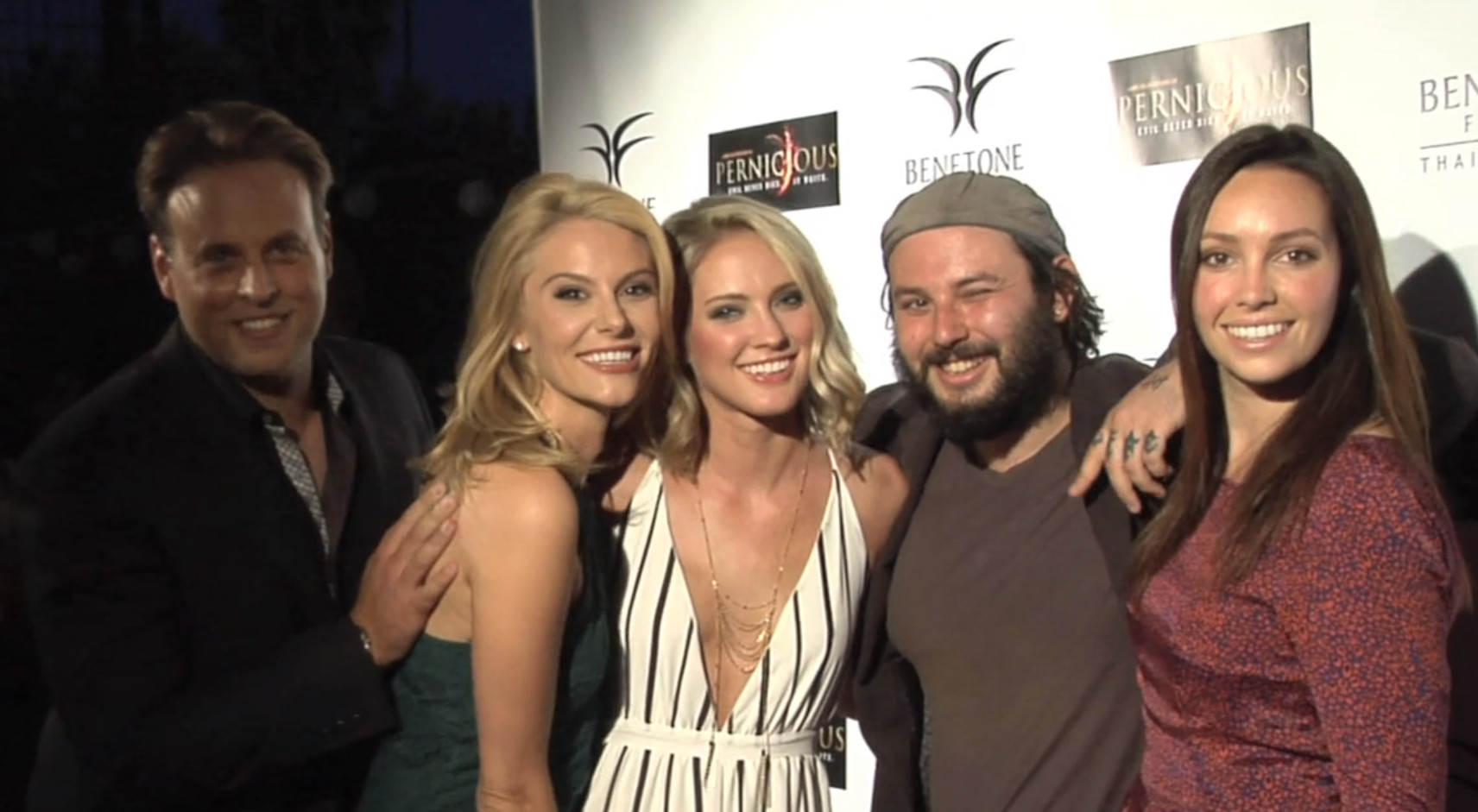
Emily O'Brien, right, with people from the 2015 film Pernicious.

Emily Roya O'Brien is a British Emmy nominated actress and writer who is known for her role of Spider Rose in David Fincher’s Love Death & Robots. Jana Hawkes Fisher on The Young and the Restless from 2006 to 2011. She voiced The Woman in the Love, Death & Robots episode "The Witness", which won a Primetime Emmy Award for Outstanding Individual Achievement in Animation. She went on to voice Eve in the Love, Death & Robots episode "Pop Squad", part of the second season. She also portrayed Julia in the 2014 film Pernicious and provided the voices of Camille and Samira in League of Legends, and Y'shtola in Final Fantasy XIV: A Realm Reborn. Emily also voiced Gamora in Guardians of the Galaxy: The Telltale Series and Special Agent Iman Avesta in Batman: The Enemy Within. In 2018, she became part of the main cast of the animated film Dagon Troll World Chronicles. She also voiced Amelie and young Bridget Strand in the 2019 game Death Stranding. In 2020, O'Brien joined the cast of Days of Our Lives and currently portrays the character Gwen Rizczech, the daughter of Jack Deveraux (Matthew Ashford) on the daytime drama. In October 2023, O'Brien took over the role of Theresa Donovan, the daughter of Shane Donovan (Charles Shaughnessy) and Kimberly Brady (Patsy Pease).

== Life and career ==
She portrayed Jana Hawkes Fisher in The Young and the Restless. O'Brien was nominated for three Daytime Emmy Awards for her performance in The Young and the Restless. She portrayed the role again in November 2008, when a parody of the show was the theme of the 1st showcase on The Price Is Right. O'Brien portrayed the role initially on a recurring status from 11 May to 5 September 2006, and then on contract from 10 October 2006 to 20 February 2007, when the character disappeared from the canvas temporarily until her return on 15 June 2007. O'Brien earned two Daytime Emmy Award nominations for Outstanding Younger Actress in 2008 and 2009. In March 2011, news broke that O'Brien had been let go from The Young and the Restless, with her final airdate on 6 May 2011. Prior to her dismissal, O'Brien was pre-nominated for another Daytime Emmy in the same category.

O’Brien is in much demand as a voice actor, and provided the voices of Y'Shtola in Final Fantasy XIV: A Realm Reborn, Camille in League Of Legends, Faris Scherwiz in World of Final Fantasy, and Veruca Salt in Tom and Jerry: Willy Wonka and the Chocolate Factory.

Emily then portrayed Julia in the 2014 supernatural horror film Pernicious, directed by James Cullen Bressack.

She also voiced Gamora in the Telltale video game, Guardians of the Galaxy: The Telltale Series. She voiced Special Agent Iman Avesta in Batman: The Enemy Within, a fan of Batman. O'Brien is partially deaf, and teared up having to voice a scene where Avesta can be rendered deaf by the Riddler.

In 2018, she briefly played Jillian Marshall in the Focus on the Family radio program Adventures in Odyssey. That same year, she provided the voice of Renee Chandler in the CW Seed animated series Constantine: City of Demons. She also appeared as the suspicious Portia in the thriller Dangerous Matrimony, then signed on to play the voice of Ruth the human mother and wife of the Ambassador of Earth in the upcoming dark fantasy motion comic Dagon Troll World Chronicles that is set to be released in 2021. She reprised the role of Gamora in Marvel: Ultimate Alliance 3: The Black Order.

O'Brien appeared in Hideo Kojima's 2019 game Death Stranding as the voices of Bridget and the young Amelie Strand, characters using the likeness of Lindsay Wagner. She has several projects in hand that are currently in post-production, like Vampire Dad, Iris, and Beautifully Flawed.

In May 2020, it was announced that O'Brien had joined the cast of Days of Our Lives in the role of Gwen Rizczech. She made her first appearance on 1 June of the same year.

On October 2, 2023, it was announced she would assume the role of Theresa Donovan on Days of Our Lives.

In November 2024, it was announced O'Brien would return to play Theresa in March 2025, before reprising her role as Gwen Rizczech in July 2025 on Days of Our Lives.

== Filmography ==
=== Film ===
Year	Title	Role	Notes
2006	Séance	Girl	
2006	Coma	Nurse	Video short
2010	New Glasses		Short film
2011	Matchup	His Sweetheart	Short film
2011	Beatrice	Beatrice	Short film; also writer and producer
2012	SuperWannabeHeroes	Super Sally	Short film
2014	Edgar Allan Poe's the Cask		Short film
2014	Pernicious	Julia	
2014	The Janus Project Preview	Lexi	Short film
2014	On the Run	Amy	Short film
2016	Restoration	Rebecca Jordan	
2016	Honey Jar: Chase for the Gold	Ann Jordan	
2016	The Bad Batch	Dream Girl	
2017	The Bigfoot Project	Jamie Kerrigan	
2017	Tom and Jerry: Willy Wonka and the Chocolate Factory	Veruca Salt (voice)	Direct-to-video
2018	Get Married or Die	Sandi	
2018	Too Close	The Girl	Short film
2018	Vampire Dad	Natasha	
2018	Dangerous Matrimony	Portia	
2018	Constantine: City of Demons – The Movie	Renee Chandler (voice)	
2019	Iris	Iris	Short film
2019	Dagon Troll World Chronicles	Ruth	
2019	The Cloud	Margerie	
2021	Mortal Kombat Legends: Battle of the Realms	Jade, Lin Kang (voice)	Direct-to-video
2022	The Sea Beast	Villagers (voice)	
2023	Batman: The Doom That Came to Gotham	Talia al Ghul, Martha Wayne (voice)	Direct-to-video

=== Television ===
Year	Title	Role	Notes
2006	What About Brian	Girl at Club	Episode: "Two in Twenty-Four"
2006–2011	The Young and the Restless	Jana Hawkes	Series regular
2016	Rock in a Hard Place	Young Debbie	Unknown episodes
2017	One Day at a Time	VO Operator	Episode: "Hold, Please"
2018–2019	Constantine: City of Demons	Renee Chandler (voice)	2 episodes; web series
2019–2025	Love, Death & Robots	Eve, The Woman, Rose (voice)	3 episodes
2019	Beautifully Flawed	Susan	Television film
2020–present	Days of Our Lives	Gwen Rizczech, Theresa Donovan	Regular role
2024	Tomb Raider: The Legend of Lara Croft	Young Agent, Passenger #2 (voice)	Episode: "Whanaungatanga"

=== Video games ===
Year	Title	Role	Notes
2013	Final Fantasy XIV: A Realm Reborn	Y'shtola	English dub
2014	Middle-earth: Shadow of Mordor	Eryn	
2015	The Order: 1886	Additional voices	
2016	World of Final Fantasy	Faris Scherwiz	English dub
2016	League Of Legends	Camille, Samira	
2017	Guardians of the Galaxy: The Telltale Series	Gamora	
2017–2018	Batman: The Enemy Within	Iman Avesta, Bartender, Agency Female #3	
2017	Paranormal Activity: The Lost Soul	The Witch	
2017	Dishonored: Death of the Outsider	Rats Whispers	
2018	God of War	Additional voices	
2018	Call of Duty: Black Ops 4	Additional voices	
2018	Thief of Thieves	Taraneh Jamshidi	
2019	The Elder Scrolls Online	Khamira, additional voices	
2019	Days Gone	Additional voices	
2019	Marvel: Ultimate Alliance 3: The Black Order	Gamora	
2019	Indivisible	Mary	
2019	Death Stranding	Amelie, young Bridget	Lindsay Wagner as model
2019	Apex Legends	Additional voices	
2020	Tell Me Why	Mary-Ann Ronan	
2021	Nier Reincarnation	Mama	
2022	Saints Row	Player Voice 6	
2022	Gotham Knights	Talia al Ghul	
2022	God of War Ragnarök	Verðandi	
2022	Marvel's Midnight Suns	Scarlet Witch	
2023	Starfield	Sarah Morgan	
2024	Dead by Daylight	Lara Croft	
2026	Highguard	The Air Operator	
2026	Order of the Sinking Star	The Queen, Vedessud	

=== Other ===
- 2009: She is featured as the test subject in a TED talk about recreating human faces in digital, photo-realistic quality.
- 2016: She voiced Scout Three in Rogue One: Recon A Star Wars 360 Experience.
- 2018: She briefly played Jillian Marshall on Adventures in Odyssey.
- 2024: O'Brien voiced Wonder Woman in the web series DC Heroes United.

== Awards ==
- ACTF Irene Ryans Theater festival Finalist and 2006 Nominee (2005)
- CHS Film Festival: Best Actress of 2003 Best Film (Pleasant Dreams) of 2003 (2003)
- DTASC Shakespeare Festival : 3rd place award for Othello (2003)
- BEST FEST San Diego Film Festival (2003) 3rd place award for Pleasant Dreams
- Team Power Award Don't Drink the Water from the city of Carlsbad (2002)
- Daytime Emmy Award Nomination: Outstanding Younger Actress in a Drama Series (2008 Nominee)
- Daytime Emmy Award Nomination: Outstanding Younger Actress in a Drama Series (2009 Nominee)
- Daytime Emmy Award Nomination: Outstanding Younger Actress in a Drama Series (2011 Nominee)
