= Brandon Slagle =

American filmmaker and former actor

- Born: Austin, Texas, U.S.
- Occupations: Director, Screenwriter
- Years active: 2001-present
- Partner: Devanny Pinn (2010–2023)

Brandon Slagle is an American filmmaker and former actor, known for his films The Black Dahlia Haunting, The Flood, House of Manson, and Affinity.

Prior to his career in the film industry, he was the frontman of the Industrial Metal band Die Section and was mentored by the late Wayne Static of Static-X.

== Career ==
Slagle began his career as an actor appearing in numerous low-budget science fiction and horror films including Plasterhead, Biohazard: Patient Zero, Daylight's End, Where the Dead Go to Die, the Uwe Boll-produced Kinky Killers as well as small roles in mainstream fare such as Argo.

In 2012, he and former partner Devanny Pinn self-financed the supernatural thriller The Black Dahlia Haunting, which Slagle wrote and directed. They went on to produce other microbudget genre films Dead Sea and the Charles Manson biopic House of Manson which received positive reviews, features in publications such as Rolling Stone and licensing deals with Hulu and Sky TV. During this time, Slagle was post-production coordinator at Crystal Sky Pictures.

In 2016 news of his film Crossbreed went viral when the casting of Vivica A. Fox as the President of the United States was found to be the first time an African-American woman had been cast as the president in a feature film.

In 2018 he directed The Dawn, starring Stacey Dash, Jonathan Bennett, Teilor Grubbs, Devanny Pinn, and Ryan Kiser, which was released theatrically by Vertical Entertainment on January 10, 2020.

In 2019 he directed Attack of the Unknown, starring Richard Grieco, Tara Reid, Robert LaSardo, Jolene Andersen, and Douglas Tait (actor). In 2021 he directed four feature films: Frost, starring Devanny Pinn and Vernon Wells; Arena Wars, starring Michael Madsen, Eric Roberts, Robert LaSardo, and John Wells; Breakout, starring Louis Mandylor, Kristos Andrews, Brian Krause, and Tom Sizemore; and Battle for Saipan, starring Casper Van Dien, Louis Mandylor, and Jeff Fahey.

In 2022, he replaced director Jared Cohn on The Flood, starring Nicky Whelan. It was released by Lionsgate in 2023.

In 2023 he was hired to direct Affinity, featuring Marko Zaror in his first English-speaking lead role. The film was released September 30th, 2025 to generally positive reviews.

In addition to his work as director, he has also contributed to the screenplays of 3 Days in Malay and Operation Blood Hunt, both directed by Louis Mandylor; the coming-of-age drama The Midway Point, starring Sean Ryan Fox, Catharine Daddario, and Wes Studi; and Last Chance Motel, with Scout Taylor-Compton and Danielle Harris, who co-directed. The movie starred Harris and Taylor-Compton alongside Heather Langenkamp, Shane West, and Monica Keena.

== Personal life ==
Slagle was born in Austin, Texas.

His late Father Larry Slagle was the Backstage Manager at the Armadillo World Headquarters, working with musicians such as BB King, Linda Ronstadt, Santana, Journey, Frank Zappa and others. [1] His mother Suzette Jacobs is an oboist who is music director of New York City's annual Washington Square Music Festival.[1]

He was previously married to actress and producer Devanny Pinn, with whom he has one daughter.

== Filmography ==
=== As director ===
- 2005 The Dark Avengers
- 2007 Subject 87
- 2008 In the Land of Wicked Gods (short film)
- 2009 Opiate (short film)
- 2011 Cult Vol. 1 (segment "Opiate")
- 2011 Wonderland
- 2011 Area 51 Confidential
- 2012 The Black Dahlia Haunting
- 2014 Dead Sea
- 2014 House of Manson
- 2017 Escape from Ensenada (aka California Dreaming)
- 2018 Crossbreed
- 2019 The Dawn
- 2020 Attack of the Unknown
- 2022 Frost
- 2022 Battle For Saipan
- 2023 Arena Wars
- 2023 Breakout
- 2023 The Flood
- 2025 Affinity
- 2026 Alien Horde
- ???? Between Dark and Light

=== As writer ===
- 2023 3 Days in Malay
- 2023 The Midway Point
- 2024 Operation Blood Hunt
- 2026 Last Chance Motel
- 2026 Final Act

=== Selected acting filmography ===
==== Film ====
- 2005 The Dark Avengers as Bryan Yuen Sage
- 2006 Plasterhead as Henry
- 2006 Disquiet as Brandon Dalisay
- 2007 Polycarp as Dean Zimmer
- 2007 Methodic as Detective Colin McDermott
- 2010 15 till Midnight as Lukas Reyes
- 2011 2012: Ice Age as The Major
- 2012 The Black Dahlia Haunting as Malcolm
- 2012 Argo as Canadian Embassy Staffer #1
- 2012 Biohazard: Patient Zero as Dr. Jonathan Wright
- 2012 Where the Dead Go to Die as Daddy
- 2013 Entity as Damon
- 2013 Dead Sea as Kier Than
- 2014 House of Manson as Uncle Maddox
- 2016 When Black Birds Fly as Caine
- 2016 Daylight's End as 'Bunny'
- 2020 JL Family Ranch 2 as Jeremy

==== Television ====
- 2005 Sesame Street (1 episode) as Alphabet Town Resident

=== Music video ===
Year	Title	Artist	Ref.
2007	"Halos for Heroes"	Full Blown Chaos	
2008	"Burn You Down"	Opiate for the Masses	
2008	"A Certain Death"	Misery Signals	
2010	"Terra Firma"	MyChildren MyBride	
2012	"Night of the Chainsaw"	Insane Clown Posse	
