= Philosophy of a Knife =

2008 horror film by Andrey Iskanov

- DVD cover
- Directed by: Andrey Iskanov
- Written by: Andrey Iskanov
- Produced by: Andrey Iskanov
- Starring: Yukari Fujimoto; Yumiko Fujiwara; Svyatoslav Iliyasov; Manoush
- Cinematography: Andrey Iskanov
- Edited by: Andrey Iskanov
- Music by: Alexander Shevchenko
- Production company: Unearthed Films
- Distributed by: TLA Releasing
- Release date: July 8, 2008 (United States)
- Running time: 247 minutes
- Countries: Russia; United States
- Languages: English; Russian

Philosophy of a Knife is a 2008 mondo docudrama written, produced, shot, edited, and directed by Andrey Iskanov. It covers the Japanese Army's Unit 731, mixing archival footage, interviews, and extremely graphic reenactments of experiments.

The film is four hours long and is presented in two parts (Part one and Part two). It was shot in black and white and in English. The interviews are shot in color and have English subtitles.

== Plot ==
During World War II in China, a Japanese covert division known as Unit 731 conducts gruesome experiments on humans in its research for biological and chemical warfare.

== Release ==
Philosophy of a Knife was shown at the 2008 Sitges Film Festival. TLA Releasing and Unearthed Films released the unrated film on DVD in July 2008.

== Soundtrack ==
The film features Manoush and Cyanide Savior's song "Dead Before Born" as well as a song by A. Shevchenko, "Forgive Me", with Manoush speaking the introduction to the track. It also includes an original score by Shevchenko. A selection of tracks named Choice Cuts from Philosophy of a Knife has been released as a limited edition double vinyl, plus a bonus CD by Spikerot Records in 2018.

== Reception ==
The Worldwide Celluloid Massacre has Philosophy of a Knife listed as the fifth most disturbing film it has covered, and stated that while it was interesting and intense "I was reminded of Gibson's Passion in that the movie takes an ambitious and difficult subject, then spends most of its time focusing only on gore".

Rob Hunter of the Film School Rejects called it a "crappy exploitation film" and "pseudo-documentary" that could only be worth watching "if all of Iskanov's footage was edited out, and just the documentary footage coupled with the dry, British, informative narration were left". A 0 out of 5 was given by Dread Central's Scott A. Johnson, who concluded, "As a reviewer, one tries to find a few positive things to say about each film. Congratulations are in order for Philosophy of a Knife in that it succeeded in being the crappiest pile of masturbatory, art-house wannabe, pedantic and mean-spirited shit I've ever had the displeasure of watching".

== See also ==
- Men Behind the Sun
