= Pernicious =

- Original poster
- Directed by: James Cullen Bressack
- Written by: James Cullen Bressack; Taryn Hillin
- Produced by: Rachvin Narula; Kulthep Narula; Daemon Hillin; Deepak Simhal
- Starring: Ciara Hanna; Emily O'Brien; Jackie Moore
- Music by: Steven Bernstein
- Distributed by: Benetone Films
- Release date: October 15, 2014
- Countries: United States; Thailand
- Language: English

Pernicious is a Thai-American supernatural horror film directed by James Cullen Bressack, who also wrote the story along with co-writer Taryn Hillin. The film stars Ciara Hanna, Emily O'Brien, and Jackie Moore.

== Cast ==
- Ciara Hanna as Alex
- Emily O’ Brien as Julia
- Jackie Moore as Rachel
- Russell Geoffrey Banks as Colin
- Sohanne Bengana as Vlad
- Byron Gibson as Byron
- Jared Cohn as Shane
- Sara Malakul Lane as Samorn
- Jack Prinya as Male Nurse
- Wallop Terathong as Sang
- Pixit Sangkaew as Youn Sang
- Irada Hoyos as Vanida
- Todstham Piumsomboon as Tiwa
- Thanchanok Kaewta as Isra
- Chanokporn Suwanposri as Female Shopkeeper
- Warakorn Jitpat as Male Shopkeeper 1
- Supachai Girdsuwan as Male Shopkeeper 2
- Alexandra Merle as Streetwalker
- Boonchu Namjaidee as Doctor

== Production ==
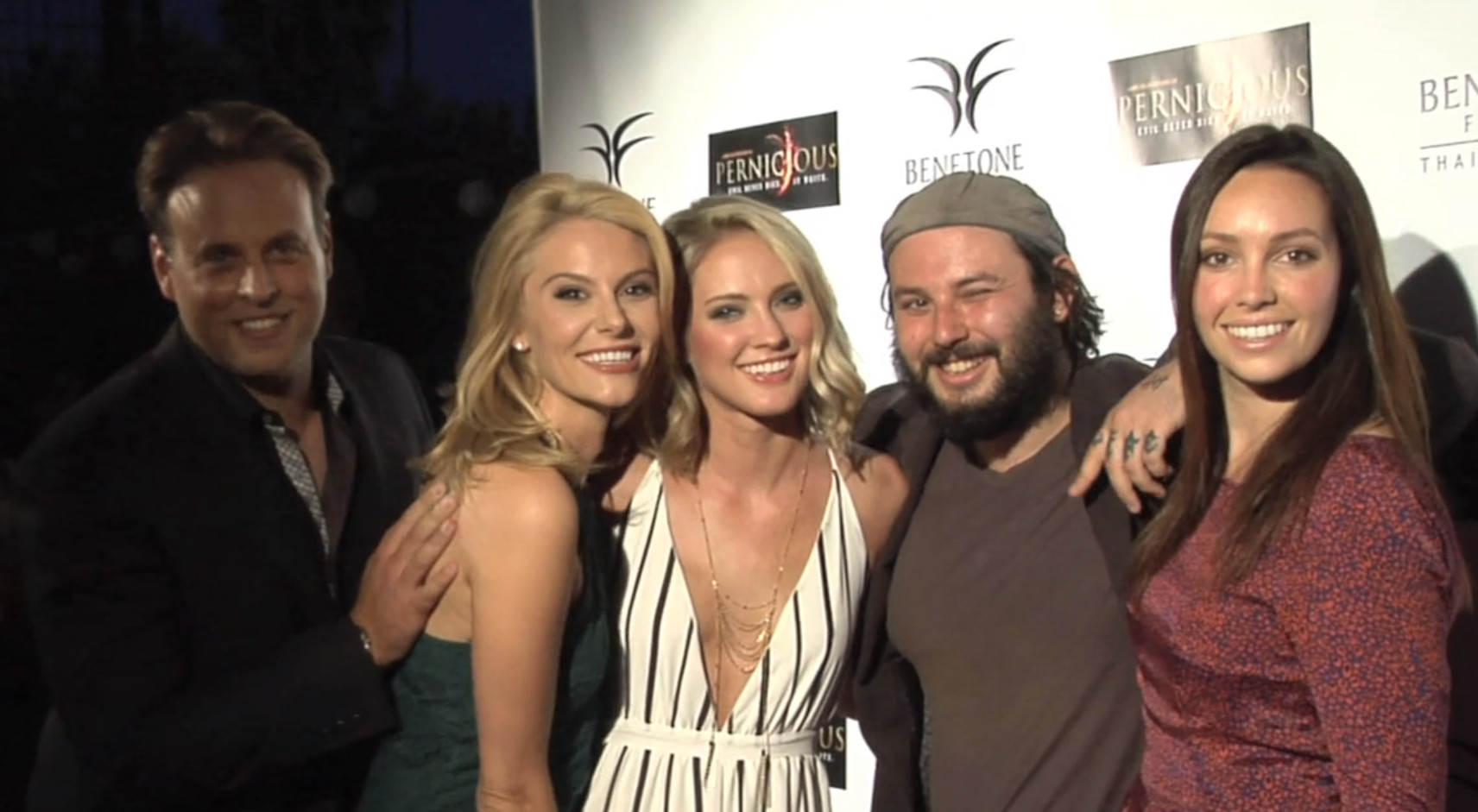
Left to right: producer Daemon Hillin, actress Jackie Moore, actress Ciara Hanna, director James Cullen Bressack, actress Emily O'Brien.

Pernicious is produced by Benetone Hillin Entertainment, a company formed from the partnership of Daemon Hillin and Benetone Films, a leading production service company in Thailand. The movie was shot completely in Thailand. Vantage Media International is reported to represent world rights to the movie.
