= Faris Scherwiz =

Fictional character in the Final Fantasy series

- Final Fantasy character
- Faris in Final Fantasy Brave Exvius.
- First game: Final Fantasy V (1992)
- Created by: Hironobu Sakaguchi
- Designed by: Kazuko Shibuya; Yoshitaka Amano (promotional art)
- Voiced by: EN: Emily O'Brien; JA: Rie Tanaka

Faris Scherwiz (Japanese: ファリス・シェルヴィッツ, Hepburn: Farisu Sheruvittsu) is a character in the Final Fantasy series. She first appears in Final Fantasy V as an early antagonist and later one of its protagonists. She was born Princess Sarisa Scherwil Tycoon, but was lost at sea and raised as a boy by pirates. She joins the group, hoping to understand why protagonist Lenna Charlotte Tycoon has the same pendant as her. She was created by Hironobu Sakaguchi and was based on the protagonist of the manga Princess Knight. Her promotional artwork was created by Yoshitaka Amano.

In the first English version of Final Fantasy V, she spoke with a pirate accent, which was changed in the Game Boy Advance port of Final Fantasy V. The accent was the subject of criticism. Faris was otherwise well-received, identified as a standout of the game's cast and a strong female character.

== Conception and design ==
Concept art of Faris Scherwiz by Kazuko Shibuya

Faris Scherwiz is a pirate captain who was created as a protagonist for Final Fantasy V by Hironobu Sakaguchi, who based the idea of her being a Princess disguised as a man on the manga Princess Knight. Standing 172 centimetres (5 ft 7 1/2 in) tall, Faris is a purple-haired woman with a peek-a-boo hairstyle obscuring her right eye. She was designed by Kazuko Shibuya, who also designed her in-game sprites. The overall process was demanding for Shibuya due to the large number of "Job" options in the game, each requiring their own sprite set. The outfit she designed for the Dancer Job drew inspiration from Japanese singer Linda Yamamoto's look, in particular the pants and exposed stomach.

Promotional art of Final Fantasy V's cast was commissioned from artist Yoshitaka Amano, who identifies her as one of his favorite characters. Amano's art of Faris art differs significantly from her in-game depiction, removing the peek-a-boo hairstyle and making her blonde instead. This design has been used in some later appearances of the character, such as Final Fantasy Brave Exvius. Amano additionally drew several unused pieces which depicted her wearing a red outfit with a flowing cape she could wrap around herself, exposed upper thighs, and a see-through section of her top that exposed her midriff.

In the Japanese version, Faris uses the masculine pronoun ore to present a tough and masculine image. The name Faris is Arabic for "Knight", while her birth name Sarisa is derived from a type of Macedonian spear. Unlike the Japanese version, the first official English translation in the PlayStation version of Final Fantasy V featured in Final Fantasy Anthology had her speak in a pirate accent. This was changed in the Game Boy Advance port. She is voiced by Rie Tanaka in the Japanese version of World of Final Fantasy and by Emily O'Brien in the English version.

== Appearances ==
Faris first appears in Final Fantasy V, where she is the captain of a pirate ship disguised as a man. Before the events of Final Fantasy V, she was raised as Sarisa Scherwil Tycoon, the daughter of King Alexander Highwind Tycoon and sister of Lenna Charlotte Tycoon. She is lost at sea at a young age and discovered by pirates, who name her Faris after she has trouble pronouncing her name. She befriends a sea dragon named Syldra who helps move her ship without wind. Protagonists Bartz Klauser, Lenna Charlotte Tycoon, and Galuf Doe attempt to steal her ship in order to find and protect three Crystals after a first has already been shattered. She captures them and tries to hold Lenna ransom due to her being royalty, but decides to help them find the Wind Crystal when she realizes that she and Lenna share the same pendant. Faris becomes one of the Warriors of Light along with the other protagonists to protect the other Crystals. Syldra protects Faris from an attack and is lost at sea, causing Faris grief and forcing them to find another means of transportation. Her true gender is discovered by Bartz and Galuf. She is later shown a vision of someone she cares about, who turns out to be King Tycoon, leading her to suspect that she and Lenna are related.

The second Crystal is shattered, and Syldra appears to rescue them, but Syldra's wounds are too great and she drifts into the current. They attempt to save the Fire Crystal but are unable to do so. Faris tells Lenna that they are sisters, and they discover King Tycoon on their way to find the Earth Crystal. Tycoon then proceeds to attack the group. They are saved by Galuf's granddaughter Krile who brings him to his senses. The Earth Crystal shatters and releases antagonist Exdeath, leading the King to sacrifice himself to protect the group. Faris battles against Exdeath in another world, where he shatters that world's Crystals and kills Galuf. Faris wakes up in Tycoon Castle where her return is celebrated, but she dislikes this and she and Lenna reunite with Bartz and Krile. She also discovers Syldra's spirit, who grants Faris the power to summon her. They battle against Exdeath and their spirit reforms the Crystals to bring back peace to the worlds. Faris returns to Tycoon Castle to serve as Queen, but soon returns to a life of piracy. She reunites with the other Warriors of Light years later.

She has appeared as a playable character in Theatrhythm Final Fantasy, Dissidia Final Fantasy Opera Omnia, and Final Fantasy Record Keeper. She appears in World of Final Fantasy as a supporting character.

== Critical reception ==
Since appearing in Final Fantasy V, Faris has received positive reception, particularly as a female video game character. In a Japanese poll on players' favorite Final Fantasy women, Faris ranked eighth, tied with Garnet from Final Fantasy IX. She is also regarded as the most memorable and interesting character in Final Fantasy V by Heidi Kemp of GamesRadar+, author Chris Kohler, and IGN staff, the latter which identified her as the 11th best Final Fantasy character. Marshall Lemon of Escapist Magazine also regarded Faris highly among its cast, questioning why she does not have her own game. Nintendojo staff described her as among the best female video game heroines due to her physical strength, valor, and defiance of stereotypes as a woman and princess.

Shayera the Starsword of RPGamer enjoyed her character archetype and noting her as an exception to a lack of cool female characters in Final Fantasy. Chad Concelmo of Destructoid praised Faris' outfit for being an interesting spin on pirate's garb and for being complex in a similar way to Faris. They took issue however with the raised collar and "too-high boots". RPGamer writer Cassandra Ramos considered Faris one of her favorite characters, saying that her character development was subtle, but was nevertheless noticeable, making Faris a memorable character for her. She appreciated Faris' relationship with Syldra, as well as how she comes to accept both her life as a pirate and as a princess.

In an observation of how Final Fantasy V improved the surrounding franchise, Sarah Prado of GameRant cited Faris specifically. In one aspect she drew attention to how the character introduced the concept of crossdressing to the franchise. In particular she noted that some of Faris' in-game outfits appeared masculine, a tone later shared by some outfit options provided for Final Fantasy X-2's Paine and Final Fantasy XIII's Lightning. Moreso though Prado felt Faris helped pave the way for stronger female characters in the franchise, noting that while the series prior had strong women they were often portrayed as delicate and feminine. Faris on the other hand "is brash and tough" with "tomboyish" aspects that were echoed by female characters in later Final Fantasy titles that were portrayed as being "a little rough around the edges" than their fellow female party members.

Jonathan Remoiville in the book La Légende Final Fantasy IV & V praised Faris' journey of self discovery, and how her interactions with the party not only allowed her to open up but also display her bravery and resourcefulness. He further added that despite being a princess, her rejection of a luxury life of a princess but also preferring her traveling companions over her previous pirate life illustrated her evolution of character. He additionally noted the symbolism in her names, feeling they helped further illustrate her fighting spirit, while also showing the developers wanting to give her an "exotic side" in Remoiville's eyes. He further drew comparison between her artwork and in-game sprites; while the artwork portrayed her as a pirate, her sprites invoked imagery of a thief through the use of a bandana and bracelets. This coupled with the imagery of her name illustrated the two sides of her character to Remoiville: the warrior and the ruffian. He closed with describing her as "a colorful heroine, associated with many questions about the relationship to gender and self-acceptance", fitting with Final Fantasy V's adventurous spirit.

Her pirate accent in the PlayStation release of Final Fantasy V was controversial for not matching the original Japanese dialogue. Writers Aaron Lakuszka, Jeremy Parish, and Joe Juba for Nintendo World Report, 1UP.com, and Game Informer respectively particularly appreciated the English version of Final Fantasy V Advance for removing this aspect of her dialogue and found it one of its highlights.
