= Arena Wars (film) =

- ‘Arena Wars’ 2024 official release poster
- Directed by: Brandon Slagle
- Screenplay by: Michael Mahal; Sonny Mahal
- Starring: Eric Roberts; Michael Madsen; Robert LaSardo
- Cinematography: Michael Su
- Edited by: Wayne Kent
- Music by: Scott Glasgow
- Production company: Mahal Empire Mezek Films
- Distributed by: Paramount+
- Release date: June 25, 2024
- Running time: 96 minutes
- Countries: United States; United Kingdom; Canada
- Language: English
- Budget: £187,060

Arena Wars is a 2024 independent science fiction comedy film, directed by Brandon Slagle, written by Sonny and Michael Mahal, and starring Michael Madsen, Robert LaSardo and Eric Roberts.

== Plot ==
In the year 2045 convicted criminals are given the opportunity to compete for their freedom on the world's #1 televised sporting event, Arena Wars. They must survive seven rooms and seven of the most vicious killers in the country.

== Cast ==
- Michael Madsen as Samson
- Eric Roberts as Admiral Jordan
- Robert LaSardo as Perez
- John Wells as Luke Bender
- Kevin Hager as Belladonna
- BJ Mezek as Boggs
- Mercedes Peterson as Domino
- Sheri Davis as Holly Daze

== Production ==
Michael Mahal announced pre-production of Arena Wars in 2023 and raised the funds for the film via Indiegogo, raising a total of £187,060 towards the project. Eric Roberts, Robert LaSardo and Michael Madsen were confirmed for the project, with filmmaker Brandon Slagle set to direct.

== Release ==
The film was released on June 25, 2024 via direct to streaming. Paramount+ picked Arena Wars up for a video release in the United States, while Amazon Prime distributed the film on an international scale from renting and purchasing. Showtime (TV network) and The Movie Channel gave the film a TV release across the United States in late 2024.

== Reception ==
Emilie Black of Cinema Crazed said, "Arena Wars is a fun film with nods to a bunch of others that work when all put together. It has fun villains, violence cranked up to 11, and is not afraid to really go for it.

Film Threat gave the film an 8.5/10, praising the film for its unique use of set design and good execution of fight scenes, especially considering the films low budget.

Influx Magazine said, "Arena Wars says to viewers and would-be filmmakers, this is what you can do when you make great use of the available resources, have a team of people that believe, and a leader in Slagle who is experienced and clearly knows what he is doing."
