= Where the Dead Go to Die =

2012 film by James Creamer

- Release poster
- Directed by: James Creamer
- Written by: James Creamer
- Produced by: James Creamer
- Starring: Ruby Larocca; Brandon Slagle; Joey Smack; Linnea Quigley; Denvanny Pinn
- Edited by: James Creamer
- Music by: Carlos Bonilla; Flyface; Jimmy ScreamerClauz
- Production companies: Chainsaw Kiss; Draconian Films
- Distributed by: Unearthed Films
- Release date: February 21, 2012
- Running time: 95 minutes
- Country: United States
- Language: English

Where the Dead Go to Die is a 2012 American adult animated surrealist horror anthology film written, directed, composed, edited, and animated by James "Jimmy ScreamerClauz" Creamer. This film is noted as an example of extreme cinema because of its graphic depictions of violence.

== Plot ==
The film mostly follows Tommy, Ralph and Sophia, a group of children living on the same block. A demon begins to stalk them in the form of a talking, black, red-eyed dog named Labby. The dog-like demon takes them on a hellish ride through dimensions and time periods.

=== Chapter I: Tainted Milk ===
On his way to school, a boy named Tommy encounters Labby, who tells him that his unborn brother is the Antichrist and that Tommy must kill him. Labby claims that his mother's breast milk will become tainted after having her second child.

Guided by Labby, Tommy is unable to kill his mother. Labby pulls her baby out from the womb, and bites off his father's penis. Tommy passes out and has visions where a fetus is trapped in a bubble, and his parents have mutated into anthropomorphic dogs.

He ponders his situation at a well, where a spirit named Monk asks him for his greatest wish. Tommy wishes his parents were still alive, and Labby says his wish will be granted if he gives him his virginity. Tommy has sex with Labby on top of his mother’s corpse. When Labby leaves, Tommy clutches onto his unborn brother, and then proceeds to bury his parents and his brother.

=== Chapter II: Liquid Memories ===
A serial killer and drug addict, introduced in the film as "The Man" at the well, routinely kills his victims in a church and extracts a memory gland that he uses to alter his own memories.

A prostitute offers sexual favors to a paraplegic veteran man in an alley. The veteran has a flashback and confuses the prostitute for the enemy. He pulls out her eye, leading her to kill him by stabbing him in the neck with a bottle. She arrives at the church where The Man promptly kills her. He injects himself with her memories, and experiences them, which includes imagery of shadow beings, demonic entities and faceless people. The Man fashions a gun and shoots himself.

=== Chapter III: The Mask That the Monsters Wear ===
Young Ralph wears a mask to conceal his Siamese twin brother, and is routinely abused by his family. He has a crush on a classmate, a girl named Sophia, so he goes to her house and talks with her father, who gives him a VHS tape of Sophia being molested. Ralph dislikes that she is crying in the video, but her father responds by telling him to watch it again.

Ralph, at the well, is pushed in by Labby. He has a dream where Sophia asks him to take off his mask, he does so and she is not disgusted. He arrives at Sophia's house, where her father tells him to have sex with Sophia while he films.

Ralph comes home to find his father watching the new tape; he says he's proud of Ralph, and admits to raping Sophia. Ralph murders him with a baseball bat and shoots his mother. He arrives at Sophia's house and kills her father, along with one of two men filming another video. Labby tells Ralph to kill his twin, so he cuts off his twin's face.

=== Epilogue ===
Ralph returns to find the spirit, Tommy and Sophia at the well. The film ends with a view of the three children (Tommy, Sophia and Ralph) alongside the spirit (Monk), the prostitute and The Man, who is nailed to a cross.

== Cast ==
- Ruby LaRocca as:
  - Sophia
  - Tommy's Mother
  - The Hooker
  - The Lady In The Well
- Brandon Slagle as:
  - The Man
  - Daddy
- Joey Smack as:
  - Ralph Stanley
  - Tommy's Father
  - The Legless War Veteran
- Jimmy ScreamerClauz as Labby
- Victor Bonacore as Smiling Man
- Joshua Michael Green as Tommy
- Linnea Quigley as Sophia's Mother
- M dot Strange as Doctor
- Trent Haaga as Mr. Stanley
- Devanny Pinn as Mrs. Stanley
- Edward Bonacore as The Shadow People
- Carlos Bonilla as:
  - Johnny
  - The Shadow People
- Will Da Beast as Brown Bear
- Jennifer English as Tommy's Mother
- Jay Longo as:
  - The Smiling Monsters
  - The Man On The Tape
- Meatsock as Flashback Tommy
- Violet Riot as Fuzzy Bunny
- Swift Treweeke as Screaming
- Ian Wright as Man On Fire
- Emily Youcis as Alfred Alfer

== Production ==
After high school, Jimmy ScreamerClauz began working and teaching himself basic animation, filmmaking, and electronic music. He stated that he was fascinated with horror films but had no formal training in animation and instead learned by using the 3D graphics program Maya and watching tutorials on YouTube. This led him to complete his first film called Reality Bleed-Through, which he said was frustrating to make but had a big influence on the segment Tainted Milk.

Tainted Milk was originally written as a black comedy parody of Lassie, which originated as a short comic book with the title The Night Labby Came Home, centering around a boy named Tommy, alongside other kids, who each fall into a well where a lady lives and tells them to do bad acts. After finishing half of the comic, ScreamerClauz instead decided to make a 3D animation and bought models from Cinema 4D's Interposer plugin to animate scenes on his computer and edit them with Adobe Premiere. He re-wrote the script a number of times and hired actress Ruby LaRocca and actors Joshua Michael Greene, Victor Bonacore, and Joey Smack. He told them to act 'over the top', and included a laugh track and other sound effects. After the first edit, he realized how off-putting the models and animation were and changed the score and dialogue, leaving it with "some weird bio-polar [sic] balance". The animation was to be released as a web-series.

After its completion, he began work on two more segments but tried to treat them like serious horror films with less comedic elements. Liquid Memories, originally called The Lovening, recast the actors from Tainted Milk, with the addition of Brandon Slagle as "The Man". It was written as a dark horror, with religious themes about a man losing his soul after experiencing the intense memories of a street prostitute. After completing the second segment, which took a year to make, ScreamerClauz sent footage to a number of film festivals, all of whom rejected it except for the Dark Carnival Film Festival. He also sent it to the founder of Unearthed Films, Stephen Biro, who asked for more, leading ScreamerClauz to create the segment The Masks That The Monsters Wear, intended as a love story between abused children living in a dark world. ScreamerClauz utilized motion capture for the segment by using an Xbox 360 Kinect, and decided to title the full "anthology-style feature film" as Where the Dead Go to Die.

ScreamerClauz credited his daily use of marijuana and previous psilocybin mushroom and LSD experiences for the film's visuals. He also found inspiration with alien conspiracy theories, "religious scare films", and a dream about the devil, which was induced by an overdose of melatonin. In the commentary, he said that much of the film's content was included because it was "weird, funny, or fucked up". ScreamerClauz tried to not make the film's morals feel forced but instead tried to leave its message up to the audience. The film altogether took three years to make, as ScreamerClauz would stop animating for months at a time before starting again.

== Release and reception ==
It was positively reviewed in publications such as Rue Morgue, DVDtalk, and horrornews. Other publications, such as TheTopTens, reviewed the film negatively.
