= Jelena Gavrilović =

Serbian actress (born 1983)

- Јелена Гавриловић
- Born: 18 January 1983 (age 43); Belgrade, SR Serbia, SFR Yugoslavia
- Occupations: Actress; singer
- Years active: 2004–present
- Height: 1.79 m (5 ft 10 in)

Jelena Gavrilović (Serbian Cyrillic: Јелена Гавриловић; born 18 January 1983) is a Serbian actress and singer.

== Life and career ==
She started acting in theatre during primary and high school in Lazarevac, her home town. She graduated from the Art Academy in Acting at the University of Novi Sad.

Gavrilović performed the title roles for musicals Hair at Atelje 212, and Grease at Terazije Theatre, both in Belgrade. She played Marija, one of the main characters, in A Serbian Film. She was also a contestant on the show Tvoje lice zvuči poznato. She ranked 4th in the finals as Branislav Mojićević, but was a public favourite with many favoured imitations fulfilled, such as Jelena Rozga, Pink, Vesna Zmijanac, Predrag Živković Tozovac and many others.

== Selected filmography ==
=== Film ===
Year	Title	Role	Notes
2008	On The Beautiful Blue Danube	Nina	
2009	Human Zoo	Natasha	
2010	A Serbian Film	Marija	
2011	Cat Run	Grushenka	

=== Television ===
Year	Title	Role	Notes
2010	The Scent of Rain in the Balkans	Eli	TV series
2017	Nemanjići - rađanje kraljevine	Eudokia Angelina	TV series
2019	The Outpost	Sana Vasić	TV series
2025	Robin Hood	Godda	
