= 15 till Midnight =

- Directed by: Wolfgang Meyer
- Written by: Brandon Slagle
- Produced by: Wolfgang Meyer; Brandon Slagle; David Hoberman; Matthew Doyle; Samantha Starr
- Starring: Brandon Slagle; Dee Martin; Devanny Pinn
- Cinematography: Daniel Lipski
- Edited by: Maximillian Williams
- Music by: Isaias Garcia
- Distributed by: Rotten Apple Productions
- Release date: September 24, 2010
- Running time: 97 minutes
- Country: United States
- Language: English

15 till Midnight is a 2010 science fiction film directed by Wolfgang Meyer and written by Brandon Slagle, who also stars in the film. The film also stars Dee Martin and Devanny Pinn.

== Plot ==
Lukas Reyes is trapped in a seemingly endless loop between parallel existences, one being occupied by his spouse, Sera, and another being occupied by a relation from another life, Nara. As worlds seem to begin colliding and further bleeding into one another, he finds himself pursued by a group of shadow-men known as "The Knowers". The common thread between everything being a significance with the time 11:45 - fifteen minutes until midnight.

== Cast ==
- Brandon Slagle as Lukas Reyes / Reverse Lukas
- Dee Martin as Damon
- Devanny Pinn as Nara
- Andrew Roth as Sarosta
- Andrea Chen as Sera
- Olivia Baseman as The Cipher
- Tony San Miguel as The Head Agent
- Thomas Daniel as Neal
