= A Serbian Film =

2010 film by Srđan Spasojević

- Theatrical release poster
- Serbian: Српски филм
- Directed by: Srđan Spasojević
- Written by: Aleksandar Radivojević; Srđan Spasojević
- Produced by: Srđan Spasojević; Dragoljub Vojnov
- Starring: Srđan Todorović; Sergej Trifunović; Jelena Gavrilović; Slobodan Beštić; Katarina Žutić
- Cinematography: Nemanja Jovanov
- Edited by: Darko Simić
- Music by: Sky Wikluh
- Production company: Contra Film
- Distributed by: Unearthed Films (United States)
- Release dates: 15 March 2010 (SXSW); 11 June 2010 (Serbia)
- Running time: 104 minutes
- Country: Serbia
- Languages: Serbian; English
- Box office: $1,550

A Serbian Film (Serbian: Српски филм, Srpski film) is a 2010 Serbian exploitation psychological horror thriller film produced and directed by Srđan Spasojević in his feature directorial debut, with Aleksandar Radivojević co-writing. It tells the experience of a financially struggling pornstar who agrees to participate in an "art film", only to discover that he has been drafted into a snuff film with pedophilic and necrophilic themes. The film stars Serbian actors Srđan Todorović, Sergej Trifunović, and Jelena Gavrilović.

Upon its debut on the art film circuit, A Serbian Film generated substantial controversy for its depictions of graphic violence and sexual content. The film has been banned in numerous countries including the Philippines, Ireland, China, New Zealand, Australia, Malaysia, and Norway, and was temporarily banned from screening in Brazil and Spain. It also required compulsory cuts in order to be released in the United Kingdom and despite being shortened by six minutes, it received an NC-17 rating in the United States, though it was later released uncut by Unearthed Films. The film's notoriety has continued to the present day, and a number of sources have described A Serbian Film as the single most disturbing film of all time.

== Plot ==
Miloš, a semi-retired pornographic actor, lives in Belgrade with his wife, Marija, and their six-year-old son, Petar. His brother Marko is a corrupt police officer who envies Miloš's life and is sexually attracted to Marija. Lejla, a former co-star, offers Miloš a starring role in an art film directed by Vukmir, an independent pornographer who wishes to cast Miloš for his powerful erection. Not informed of the details of Vukmir's film, Miloš is hesitant to participate and continue his career, but accepts to secure his family's financial future. While meeting Vukmir, Miloš passes a bald man and his entourage, regarding them warily.

The filming begins at an orphanage, where Vukmir feeds Miloš instructions through an earpiece given by Vukmir's one-eyed driver Raša, while a film crew follows him. Miloš sees a young girl named Jeca, who is being scolded by her mother for disgracing her deceased war hero husband's memory by becoming a prostitute. In a dark room, Miloš is fellated by a nurse while screens show Jeca eating an ice pop. In the next scene, Miloš is forced to receive fellatio from the mother while Jeca watches. Marko later informs Miloš that Vukmir is a former psychologist who has worked in children's television and state security. Vukmir meets a hesitant Miloš afterwards to explain his artistic style, showing a film of a woman giving birth, followed by the newborn being immediately raped by Raša, in what the director terms "newborn porn". Miloš storms out and drives away. At a road junction, he is approached and seduced by Vukmir's female doctor.

A bloodied Miloš awakens in his bed three days later with no memory of what has happened. He returns to the now-abandoned set and finds several tapes. Viewing them, Miloš discovers that he was drugged to induce an aggressive, sexually aroused, and suggestible state. At Vukmir's manipulative direction, Miloš beats and rapes Jeca's mother before decapitating her, and later, a catatonic Miloš is sodomized by Vukmir's security. He then watches footage of Lejla voicing concern for Miloš, only to be restrained as her teeth are removed. A masked man enters the room and forces his penis down her throat, killing her by suffocation. The footage continues as Miloš is led to Jeca's home, where her grandmother praises him for killing her mother and offers Jeca as a "virgin commune". Miloš refuses and escapes through a window. He calls Marko from a payphone and asks him to pick him up. However, Raša arrives and drives Miloš back to the warehouse with Vukmir.

At the warehouse, after Vukmir's doctor administers more drugs, Miloš overpowers her, sticking the syringe into her throat. He is then taken into a room to have intercourse with two hidden bodies under a sheet. Miloš is guided onto one body and the masked man from Lejla's film begins sexually assaulting the other. Vukmir reveals the masked man to be Marko. Marko's victim is revealed to be Marija, while Miloš's is revealed to be Petar. Vukmir's doctor staggers into the warehouse, her vaginal area covered in blood. She is holding a bloodied metal pipe in her hand, implying that she masturbated with it after being injected with the same drug she used on Miloš. As she falls dead from vaginal hemorrhage, an enraged Miloš lunges at Vukmir and smashes his head against the floor, initiating a brawl during which Marija bites Marko in the jugular before bludgeoning him to death with a sculpture. Miloš wrestles a gun from a guard and shoots all but Raša, whom he kills by shoving his erect penis into his empty eye socket. A dying Vukmir praises Miloš's actions as truly worthy of a film.

Miloš, having recalled his actions, including locking his family in their basement before passing out earlier, returns home and frees them. Traumatized, Miloš and Marija come to a mutual understanding that they and Petar should die together, so the three gather in bed and embrace before Miloš fires a fatal shot through himself, Petar, and Marija. The next morning, another film crew enter the bedroom. As one man unzips his fly, the director (the bald man seen earlier) instructs him to "start with the little one".

== Cast ==
- Srđan Todorović as Miloš
- Sergej Trifunović as Vukmir
- Jelena Gavrilović as Marija
- Slobodan Beštić as Marko
- Katarina Žutić as Lejla
- Luka Mijatović as Stefan
- Ana Sakić as Jeca's mother
- Lena Bogdanović as Vukmir's doctor
- Miodrag Krčmarik as Raša
- Nenad Heraković as keeper #1
- Carni Đerić as keeper #2
- Anđela Nenadović as Jeca
- Tanja Divnić as a kindergarten teacher
- Lidija Pletl as Jeca's grandmother
- Natasa Miljus as a pregnant woman

== Themes ==
Speaking more than a decade after the film's release, its writer Radivojević discussed the specifics of the material for what would eventually become A Serbian Film being gathered over a period of ten years, starting in the late 1990s from a film school screenplay idea of his that the Belgrade University of Arts' Faculty of Dramatic Arts (FDU) dramaturgy student initially developed only as far as a synopsis titled Orgazmatron. Radivojević further revealed that, when it comes to the general framing of the original screenplay idea, he drew inspiration from the porn star and filmmaker Rocco Siffredi's 1990s cinematic exploits:

Siffredi had been cranking out VHS tapes depicting himself engaged in brutal sexual acts on location with local girls in different parts of Europe (mostly in marginalized and poor post-communist Eastern European countries), all of which had an uncomfortable undertone of colonialism. One particular scene that stayed in my mind has him having sex with a girl in a car. Meanwhile, in the background, you see this forest out of which a group of grizzled beggars suddenly begins to emerge, at which point Siffredi—who by now is done with the girl—'returns her' to the downtrodden locals; handing her over to them like a modern-day Marquis de Sade, as if to say: 'here you go. I've finished what I needed to do. She's all yours now.' So, by making the main character in that original synopsis an aging male porn star, I began to incorporate this notion of modern-day colonialism via sexual exploitation of a poor country's human resource.

After graduating, Radivojević became friends with fellow budding filmmaker Srđan Spasojević, a film direction graduate from Braća Karić University's Academy of Arts. Bonding over their similar cinematic tastes—mutual appreciation of Paul Schrader's Hardcore as well as Brian de Palma's Dressed to Kill, Alfred Hitchcock's Spellbound, and David Lynch—the two young men began collaborating professionally. However, unable to get multiple cinematic projects off the ground in Serbia throughout early-to-mid-2000s, the duo grew frustrated with their country's film industry—financially completely reliant on the European Union (EU) arts council grants as well local Ministry of Culture and public service television funding. In 2022, Radivojević discussed his and Spasojević's professional struggles via looking back on Serbia's 2000s cinematic output:

It was utterly hopeless. On the one hand, you had Zdravko Šotra's folksy comedies or costumed dramas/sitcoms sucking up oxygen to the near exclusion of everything else. Meanwhile, on the other hand, and this was most depressing of all, you had this EU arts council funded production using Serbia for EU's political agitprop agenda of 'promoting tolerance and reconciliation in the post-war Balkans' by boosting sappy local projects of no aesthetic value whose sole reason for receiving EU financing was their respective authors' willingness to amplify the EU-approved message, i.e. to express 'Serb contrition over what happened in the Yugoslav Wars' via essentially making victim porn, showing small miserable Serb people who are struggling mightily while nevertheless simultaneously 'doing their part in search of collective redemption' by being extremely remorseful. Breaking through that barrier and getting conventional financing in Serbia for the kind of movies we wanted to make was simply impossible.

In March 2009, six months after the shooting wrapped, the film's director Spasojević and writer Radivojević stated that the film, at that point still unreleased, is a parody of modern Serbian-made politically correct films that are financed by foreign arts council funds such as Eurimages. Commenting on the decision to connect the movie to the country via the title, Radivojević replied: "We have become synonymous with chaos and lunacy. The title is a cynical reference to that image. A Serbian Film is also a metaphor for our [Serbian] national cinema—boring, predictable and altogether unintentionally hilarious which to a certain extent is commented on and subtly parodied throughout our film." Similarly, Radivojević dismissed Serbian cinema as "pathetic state-financed films made by people who have no sense or connection to film, but are strongly supported by foreign arts council funds", while adding: "the quality of their films is of no concern to them, only the bureaucratic upholding of the rule book on political correctness."

In a May 2010 interview, while the film was being screened at festivals, Spasojević stated the film "denounces the fascism of political correctness". Questioned by the Croatian media on whether the violence depicted deals with crimes committed by Serbian soldiers during the Yugoslav Wars, Spasojević answered: "A Serbian Film does not touch upon war themes, but in a metaphorical way deals with the consequences of post-war society and a man that is exploited to the extreme in the name of securing the survival of his family."

While promoting the film's December 2010 UK theatrical release, Spasojević stated that the character of Vukmir is "an exaggerated representation of the new European film order", adding: "In Eastern Europe, you cannot get your film financed unless you have a barefoot girl who cries on the streets, or some story about war victims in our [Balkan] region ... the Western world has lost feelings, so they're searching for false ones, they want to buy feelings."

== Release ==
=== Film festival circuit ===
The first ever showing of A Serbian Film took place on 15 March 2010 at midnight in Austin as part of the 2010 South by Southwest. During the introduction by Alamo Drafthouse Cinema's owner Tim League, the audience in the theater was once again warned about the extreme nature of the scenes they were about to see. He also coaxed a handful of audience members to join him on the stage – where they jointly snorted lines of salt, squeezed lime juice into their eyes and took shots of tequila in order to "understand what Serbians have been through to create a culture of A Serbian Film." The next day, a brief report from the screening appeared in the blog section of The Wall Street Journal web site thus giving the movie its first piece of U.S. corporate media press, with the WSJ reporter expressing shock not so much at the film's content but at the fact "it looks like a relatively expensive production, moves along at a competent pace and includes solid performances, indicating the filmmakers' serious intentions lurking beneath the surface."

Next was a screening at the Brussels International Festival of Fantasy Film in April 2010 where the movie also received a lot of attention over its shocking content.

On 11 June 2010, the film had its premiere screening in Serbia as part of the Cinema City festival in Novi Sad. Due to high demand resulting from the press buzz that the movie had been generating throughout preceding months, the festival organizers decided to schedule additional screenings.

The film was run on 16–19 July 2010 during the Fantasia Festival in Montreal as part of the Subversive Serbia program.

The film was due to screen on 29 August 2010 at the Film Four FrightFest in London, UK but was pulled by the organizers following the intervention of Westminster Council. Films shown at this festival are usually shown pre-certificate but in this case Westminster Council refused to grant permission for its exhibition until it had been classified by the BBFC. Following its DVD submission to the BBFC (there were no theatrical materials available in the time frame requested for a proper theatrical classification), 49 compulsory cuts totaling four minutes and eleven seconds were ordered for DVD certification. The UK distributor, Revolver Entertainment, initially looked into the possibilities of the process, but it became clear that the film would then have to be resubmitted to the BBFC and further cuts may then have been required. It was decided that to show a heavily edited version was not in the spirit of the festival and consequently its exhibition was pulled from the schedule. The film was replaced at the festival by Rodrigo Cortés' Buried starring Ryan Reynolds.

The Raindance Film Festival, that picked up the film at the Cannes Film Festival in May, subsequently held the UK premiere and "found a way around the ban by billing the screening as a 'private event'." Westminster Council requested to monitor the invitations to the screening. The 35 mm print was shipped from the BBFC for 8 October 2010 premiere.

On 21 October 2010, the film had a single screening at Toronto's Bloor Cinema. It took place as part of the monthly event called Cinemacabre Movie Nights organized by the Rue Morgue magazine. The publication also spotlighted the film and featured it on its cover.

On 26 November 2010, the film was refused classification by the Australian Classification Board, banning sales and public showings of the film in Australia. However, on 5 April 2011, the Australian Classification Board approved a censored version of the film. However, this version was banned in the state of South Australia, and the Australian Classification Review Board later overturned the R18+ rating for the cut film and once again refused classification, effectively banning the film throughout Australia.

During March 2011, A Serbian Film won the Special Jury Prize in the 31st edition of Fantasporto, Portugal's biggest film festival, in Porto.

On 12 and 16 July 2011, the film was screened at FANTASPOA in Porto Alegre, Brazil and at least at one other film festival in the country, before being banned just before a screening in Rio de Janeiro. Initially the ban applied only in Rio, but afterwards the decision became valid throughout the country, pending further judgement of the film.

In 2020, Unearthed Films started to distribute the film uncut and uncensored in the United States in Blu-ray and DVD.

=== General theatrical release ===
A Serbian Film poster in the United Kingdom

On 24 September 2010, A Serbian Film was released uncensored (104 minutes) in Serbian theaters, with screening times scheduled late at night.

From 3 December 2010, A Serbian Film began a limited theatrical release in Croatia without age restriction. Jutarnji list reported that the first screening at the Kaptol Centar cinema in Zagreb attracted only seven people, six males and a female—with the female reportedly leaving the theater temporarily during the film's most notorious scene due to finding the specific onscreen proceedings unbearable to watch.

The film had a limited release in UK cinemas on 10 December 2010 in the edited form (99 minutes), with four minutes and eleven seconds of its original content removed by the British Board of Film Classification due to "elements of sexual violence that tend to eroticize or endorse sexual violence". A Serbian Film thus became the most censored cinema release in Britain since the 1994 Indian film Nammavar that had five minutes and eight seconds of its violent content removed.

The film had a limited release in the United States on 6 May 2011, edited to 98 minutes with an NC-17 rating. It was released on VOD at the website FlixFling on the same day, except only slightly edited to 103 minutes.

=== Home media ===
Through Invincible Pictures, a limited edition uncut version was released via DVD on 22 May 2012. Tom Ashley, CEO of the distribution company, had this to say, "Of course we would have preferred an uncut release last year. Unfortunately, the charges brought against Mr. Sala [director of the Sitges Film Festival] were something we had to seriously factor into that release. Now that those charges have been dropped, we can bring A Serbian Film to its fans as its director had intended."

Unearthed Films released a 104 minute uncut and uncensored version of the film on Blu-Ray and DVD in the United States in January 2021.

== Censorship ==
=== Australia ===
Before its release, major Australian DVD retailer JB Hi-Fi announced that they would not be distributing the film, either online or in physical stores. They attributed this to the "Disturbing content of the film" and to a disagreement with the (then) R18+ rating. However, the film was available from this retailer for a time.

It was refused classification and thus effectively banned in South Australia just days before its release date.

On 19 September 2011, the Australian Classification Review Board again refused classification, effectively banning the film from distribution anywhere in Australia. According to the Review Board, "A Serbian Film could not be accommodated within the R18+ classification as the level of depictions of sexual violence, themes of incest, and depictions of child sexual abuse in the film has an impact which is very high and not justified by context."

=== Brazil ===
The film was temporarily banned for screening in Brazil. Although the film was shown in July 2011 at the 7th Fantastic Film Festival in Porto Alegre, after being selected for the Fantastic Film Festival in Rio de Janeiro (RioFan), in the same month, the film was removed from the program at the request of Caixa, the sponsor of the festival, under the argument that the company "understands that art should have the limit of the artist's imagination, but not all creative products fit unrestrictedly in any support or place". The cancellation of the screening of the film received notes of repudiation from the festival's organization and from the Brazilian Association of Film Critics (Abraccine).

The organizers of festival scheduled a new screening of the film, on the same day that it had been scheduled for screening at the festival (23 July 2011). However, in the day before screening, the film copy was seized by a court order, thanks to a lawsuit filed by the regional office of the Democrats party, arguing that the film would "incite pedophilia". Later, in August of the same year, a preliminary injunction by a federal court in Belo Horizonte prohibited the film from being shown all over the country, arguing that the film "subverts the natural and logical order of what is reasonable" and arguing that if the injunction was not granted "serious and irreversible damages will be caused to the legal order, to the national consumer, in view of the fact that the film will be sent to the country's cinemas and shown to the entire population". Despite the ban, the film was widely downloaded illegally on the internet, increasing the interest among viewers. This was the first time a film was banned in Brazil since the promulgation of the 1988 Brazilian Constitution. On 5 July 2012, this court decision was overturned, after the judge considered "that there are no more legal reasons that prevent the film from being shown".

=== New Zealand ===
On 25 May 2012, the film was banned outright by the New Zealand Office of Film and Literature Classification.

=== South Korea ===
The film was given a Restricted rating twice by the KMRB. The first edit was submitted on 9 August 2011 with a duration of 94 minutes but was rejected for having extreme violence. The second edit was trimmed to 88 minutes and labelled as the director's edition, was submitted on 6 October 2011, but was also given the same restricted rating, this time for extreme themes.

=== Spain ===
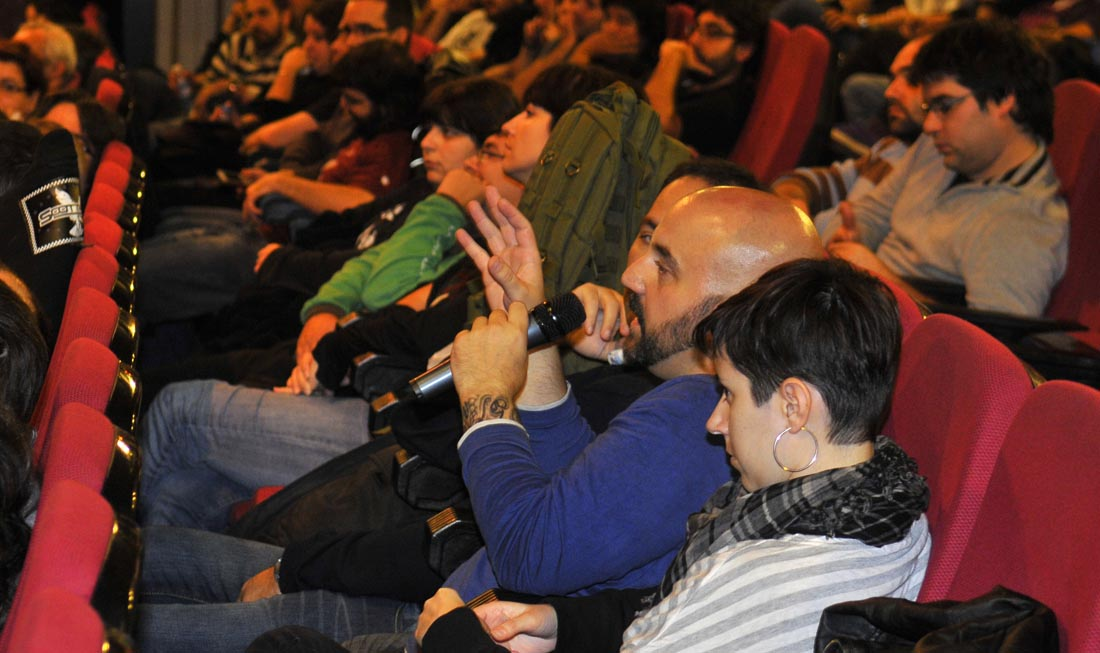
Discussion on the prohibition of showing A Serbian Film at the festival in San Sebastián

A Serbian Film was banned by a court in San Sebastián, Spain, for "threatening sexual freedom" and thus could not be shown in the XXI Semana de Cine Fantástico y de Terror (21st Horror and Fantasy Film Festival). The film was shown at an adults-only screening at the Spanish Sitges Film Festival during October 2010. As a result, the festival's director Ángel Sala was charged with exhibiting child pornography by the Spanish prosecutor who decided to take action in May 2011 after receiving a complaint from a Roman Catholic organization over a pair of scenes involving the rapes of a young child and a newborn. The charges were later dropped. The DVD version was given the Pelicula "X" classification, although the theatrical version is still banned as of 2023.

== Reaction ==
The film was released to great controversy over its portrayal of sexual violence. Spasojević responded to the controversy with: "This is a diary of our own molestation by the Serbian government. ... It's about the monolithic power of leaders who hypnotize you to do things you don't want to do. You have to feel the violence to know what it's about."

While acknowledging some level of conservatism among the public and theater owners, Spasojević says that government-enforced censorship in Serbia is non-existent and was not the driving force behind the making of A Serbian Film: "In Serbia we don't have ratings, there is no law forbidding anything from being shown in a film and there is no law forbidding anyone from buying a ticket."

In a March 2011 interview, Serbian actor and film director Dragan Bjelogrlić criticized the film: "Shallow and plain wrong—sum up my feelings about this movie. I have a problem with A Serbian Film, its director in particular. I've got a serious problem with this boy, whose father got wealthy during the 1990s—nothing against making money, but I know how money was made [in Serbia] during the '90s—and then paid for his son's education abroad. Eventually the boy came back to Serbia to film his view of the country, using his father's money, and even called the whole thing A Serbian Film. To me, that's a metaphor for something unacceptable: the second generation has come back to the country, and using the money that was robbed from the people of Serbia, has smeared the very same people by portraying them as the worst scum of the earth. You know, when the first generation of the Rockefellers finished robbing America, the second one built museums, galleries, charitable organizations, and financed America. But in Serbia, we're seeing every segment of society continually being taken apart, and for me, this movie is a paradigm of that. I've never met this boy and I really don't want to either, since that meeting wouldn't be pleasant at all."

== Critical reception ==
=== Serbia ===
In a middle-of-the-road review, Blic's cinema critic Milan Vlajčić praised the movie's direction, technical aspects, "effective iconography", and "video game pacing" while adding that its story has been taken to the edges of self-parody.

Đorđe Bajić and Zoran Janković of the web magazine Popboks gave the film a highly affirmative review, summing it up as "the dark Grand Guignol that shreds its celluloid victims with unconcealed intensity while showing, in full color and detail, the collapse of the last bastions of decency, morality, and rationality" and concluding that "it has a lot to say outside of the mere and unrestrained exploitation".

=== United States ===
On the review aggregator website Rotten Tomatoes, 48% of 31 critics' reviews are positive, with an average rating of 5.2/10. The website's consensus reads: "A pointless shocker and societal allegory, a film whose imagery is so gruesome as to leave you scarred for life... or rolling your eyes for 100 minutes."

A. O. Scott of The New York Times wrote in his review, "At first glance—and few are likely to dare a second—it belongs in the high-concept shock-horror tradition whose most recent and notorious specimen is probably The Human Centipede. As is often the case with movies like this, A Serbian Film revels in its sheer inventive awfulness and dares the viewer to find a more serious layer of meaning."

Karina Longworth of The Village Voice called the film "a passionate argument against a no-holds-barred exploration of extreme human sexuality and violence" and referred to the film's supposed commentary on the sad state of post-Milošević Serbian society as "specious lip service". She concludes: "That this film exists at all is a more cogent commentary on the nation's collective trauma than any of the direct statements or potential metaphors contained within."

Scott Weinberg wrote, "I think the film is tragic, sickening, disturbing, twisted, absurd, infuriated, and actually quite intelligent. There are those who will be unable (or unwilling) to decipher even the most basic of 'messages' buried within A Serbian Film, but I believe it's one of the most legitimately fascinating films I've ever seen. I admire and detest it at the same time. And I will never watch it again. Ever."

Alison Willmore wrote that, "Movies can use transgressive topics and imagery toward great artistic resonance. They can also just use them for pure shock/novelty/boundary-pushing, which is where I'd group Serbian Film. That it comes from a country that's spent decades deep in violent conflict, civil unrest, corruption and ethnic tensions makes it tempting to read more into the film than I think it actually offers—ultimately, it has as much to say about its country of origin as [Eli Roth's] Hostel does about America, which is a little, but nothing on the scale its title suggests."

Ain't It Cool News' Harry Knowles lists it in his Top 10 films of 2010, stating "This is a fantastic, brilliant film – that given time, will eventually outgrow the absurd reactions of people that think it is a far harder film than it actually is."

Time Out New York's Joshua Rothkopf accuses A Serbian Film of pandering to "mouth-breathing gorehounds who found Hostel a bit too soft (i.e., fanatics who would hijack the horror genre into extremity because deeper thinking is too hard)" before concluding that "the movie says as much about Eastern Europe as Twilight does about the Pacific Northwest".

Tim Anderson of horror review site Bloody Disgusting strongly discouraged anyone from ever viewing the film, writing, "If what I have written here is enough to turn your feelings of wonder into a burning desire to watch this monstrosity, then perhaps I haven't been clear enough. You don't want to see Serbian Film. You just think you do."

Filmmaker Eli Roth said the film "has some spectacular violence in it", and "If you're going to make a movie that's just flat out Serbian Film level disturbing, you've got to do it on a much smaller budget."

=== United Kingdom ===
In his negative review of A Serbian Film, BBC Radio 5 Live's Mark Kermode called it a "nasty piece of exploitation trash in the mould of Jörg Buttgereit and Ruggero Deodato", going on to add that "if it is somehow an allegory of Serbian family and Serbian politics then the allegory gets lost amidst the increasingly stupid splatter". Furthermore, he mentioned A Serbian Film again in his review of Fred: The Movie, pairing the two as his least favourite viewing experiences of the year.

Calum Waddell of Total Sci-Fi in a negative review took issue with the filmmakers' statements that their film says something about the politics of Serbia, writing, "if you want to learn about Serbia, chances are, you won't be watching a movie whose main claim to fame is that a man rapes a newborn baby", before concluding that "Srđan Spasojević will go to his grave being known as the guy who filmed a grown man having sex with a baby. And that's something that – despite all of the money, attention and champagne parties at Cannes – I would never want on my conscience. Good luck to him in regaining some humanity."

Total Film awarded the film two stars out of five, finding the film's shock hype not to be fully deserved: "a film that was slightly silly and none-too-distressing to begin with. Works best as a reflection on modern day porn's obsession with masochism and humiliation."

=== Academic writing ===
A Serbian Film has been discussed in a number of academic film studies journals from different perspectives. Mark Featherstone and Shaun Kimber analyse the film within its national and historical context and through examining its production history. Alexandra Kapka analyses the film in the context of its popularity on streaming and piracy web sites, arguing that the loss of the director's introduction on the retail DVD, in which Spasojević states A Serbian Film is a political allegory, means that the film loses much of its intended meaning. Large-scale, international audience research by Martin Ian Smith examines how ordinary viewers of the film discuss negative experiences with it and talks about how many viewers, contrary to academic interpretations of the film, often have no knowledge of the film's historical context. The study also investigated how audiences judged the censorship debate surrounding the film, with those most in favour of its censorship being those who saw no value in the film.
