= City of Rott =

- Directed by: Frank Sudol
- Written by: Frank Sudol
- Produced by: Frank Sudol
- Starring: Frank Sudol
- Cinematography: Frank Sudol
- Music by: Frank Sudol
- Production company: Blackarro Productions
- Distributed by: Unearthed Films
- Release date: August 8, 2006
- Running time: 78 minutes
- Country: United States
- Language: English

City of Rott is a 2006 American animated zombie film by Frank Sudol, who performed all filmmaking duties himself. The film uses 2D limited animation in a style similar to South Park. A sequel, titled City of Rott 2, was released in October 2014 through Amazon.com.

== Plot ==
The story begins after the Earth's water supply has been infected by a strange parasite known as Rot Worms. Rot Worm eggs were delivered by rain, and no place on the planet is free from the worms. Once hatched, they begin feasting on human flesh, turning their hosts into mindless zombies.

The film revolves around Fred, an elderly man with a walker, which he uses as a weapon. Fred appears to be losing his mind, believing his walker speaks to him as he travels through an infested city on a quest for a new pair of shoes.

While searching for a mall for the shoes, Fred encounters a recently bitten nurse. With no knowledge of a cure for the infection, the nurse quickly becomes a zombie, forcing Fred to flee the mall. Outside, he meets Jon, a skilled shooter who decides to help Fred escape the city. However, Fred loses his walker in an ensuing scuffle with zombies, where it gets taken from him by the nurse. Unwilling to abandon his closest friend (even as his slippers assume the role of an inanimate speaking object), Fred abandons Jon by stealing a motorcycle.

The motorcycle runs out of gas on a bridge, leading Fred to be surrounded on both sides by zombies. Fortunately, he manages to recover his walker from the nurse and kill numerous zombies, though he is unable to finish off the nurse herself. After fighting his way through the horde of undead, Fred rescues another survivor, an old man carrying a bottle of prune juice. However, the man flees from Fred.

Deciding to rest on a park bench, Fred discovers a newspaper detailing a new type of parasite known as Brain Worms, which eats any intake of food and eventually eats the brain of their host. As becomes evident from the symptoms of partial memory loss, rapid age progression, hallucinations, and hearing voices, Fred has already been infected by one. Unfortunately, the blood which got on him during the fight on the bridge contains Rot Worms, which quickly overpower the lesser Brain Worms, turning him into a zombie.

The next day, Jon, who was unknowingly infected with a Brain Worm when Fred patted him on the back, discovers the now infected Fred. Jon attempts to kill him but is surrounded and eaten by the zombies.

Eight days later, a man named Benjamin has begun to look for his wife in the city with his two sons and another man named Larry, the four using a van to store goods. While Benjamin has one of his sons pick up doughnuts, Larry gets attacked by the undead, then accidentally shot by the other son. Afterward, it is revealed that the nurse was Benjamin's wife and she left the group in an attempt to help others. Benjamin tries to bring her back despite her infection but is attacked and killed, while another zombie decapitates his wife.

A man named Hac is sent by his bitten friend Mac to find an antidote. Mac has begun to believe that the old man carries the cure in his bottle of prune juice. Though both Hac and Mac die before learning the truth, Mac's belief turns out to be correct. The bottle carries an antidote known as "Zombifate", which the old man constantly consumes. Elsewhere, three more survivors seen are soldiers who call themselves the Sanitation crew are driving the bus while making the zombies follow the bus with the flesh hanging by the rod as two soldiers kill the zombies. As the soldiers kill zombies one by one, as Fred who was there witness the killings, one of the soldiers spots Fred who nearly attempts to kill him until the Sanitation crew is ambushed by more zombies from the front. Fred flees away from the scene as the soldiers managed to kill all the zombies. After that, later, Fred finds the old man catches up with him, who orders him to resist the worms' influence. Fred manages to temporarily overcome the infection and save the old man from zombies, but the man dies of a sudden heart attack. Fred tries to cure himself with Zombifate, but the worm inside him refuses to accept the medicine. . Fred begins to feast on the old man's corpse consuming so much flesh that the Zombifate inside the old man's body forces the Rot Worms out of him, allowing Fred to ultimately cure himself and get to some safer position (outright stated in City of Rott 2 preview).

After the film's credits, a man who trapped himself inside a box laughs about surviving the zombies but has been infected by a Brain Worm.

== Cast ==
- Frank Sudol

Sudol performs all voices.

== Production ==
Sudol had previously worked on South Park: Bigger, Longer & Uncut as an animator and assistant technical director. On the City of Rott, he performed all the duties himself, including voice work, animation, music, writing, and directing. The film was originally a short; additional content was created to expand it to feature-length once the distributor showed interest.

== Release ==
Unearthed Films released the DVD on August 8, 2006.

== Reception ==
Steve Barton of Dread Central rated it 5/5 stars and described it as "blood-splattered blast from beginning to end that's heavy on the sick". Scot Weinberg of DVD Talk rated it 3.5/5 stars and wrote that it has a "fun concept, clever execution, unique animation, and tons of gooey gore".
