= Unearthed Films =

American film distribution company

- Type: Private
- Industry: Entertainment
- Founded: 2002
- Founder: Stephen Biro, Paul White, Rhett Rushing
- Headquarters: Los Angeles, United States
- Key people: Stephen Biro (CEO and founder)
- Products: Horror films, exploitation films, cult films
- Website: www.unearthedfilms.com

Unearthed Films is an American independent film distribution and production company specializing in extreme horror, cult, and exploitation films. It primarily imports titles from Eastern Asia and other international sources for the North American market and releases them across theatrical, home video, television, and video-on-demand platforms.

== History ==
Unearthed Films was founded in 2002 by Stephen Biro, Paul White, and Rhett Rushing to distribute independent genre films in the United States and Canada. Biro, who had previously operated a comic book store and a cult video store (Video Mayhem) in the Ybor City, Tampa, Florida, area and dealt in underground, obscure horror titles, established the company as a legitimate label focused on rare and extreme cinema.

The company’s earliest and most notable releases were the first official North American DVD editions of the cult Japanese "Guinea Pig" film series (beginning around 2002–2005, including double-feature discs and later a box set), presented uncut.

In an early interview on the company’s website, Unearthed Films revealed that its founding goal was to release extreme horror films that mainstream distributors rarely touched. Stephen Biro explained that the company aimed for "Unearthed Films to be one of the more extreme DVD labels, the hardest in North America,” and choosing to launch with the Guinea Pig series was deliberate, as these films were some of the most notorious and hard to find at that time.

Over subsequent years, Unearthed built a catalog of extreme and cult titles from Asia, Europe, and North America. In 2013, the company expanded into original production; its first projects were the "American Guinea Pig" series, a homage to the Japanese films. The initial entries were directed by Stephen Biro and others.

The company later moved its headquarters to the Los Angeles area. The company marked its 20th anniversary in 2022 and has continued to release titles on DVD, Blu-ray, and 4K, while also operating related book and music imprints focused on horror and extreme genres.

== Approach and Philosophy ==
Unearthed Films has consistently focused on releasing extreme and controversial horror titles that larger companies typically avoid. This stance was articulated early in the company’s history and has remained a defining characteristic of the label. Founder Stephen Biro later explored related personal themes in his 2011 memoir "Hellucination," which recounts his earlier atheism, intensive use of psychedelic drugs, and experiences he interpreted as leading to his conversion to Christianity.

== Partial Filmography ==
Unearthed Films has released a range of extreme horror, cult, and exploitation titles on home video, with a particular early focus on rare Asian films and later high-profile extreme titles.

=== North American distribution ===
Title
Guinea Pig
Rubber's Lover
964 Pinocchio
Black Sun: The Nanking Massacre
Aftermath
1-Ichi
Bone Sickness
Frankenhooker
Philosophy of a Knife
City of Rott
Dead Fury
Flexing with Monty
Junk
Vomit Gore Trilogy
Where the Dead Go to Die
A Serbian Film
Feed

Stephen Biro also directed the 2025 documentary A Serbian Documentary, which examines the production and reception of A Serbian Film.

=== Productions ===
Title	Director
American Guinea Pig: Bouquet of Guts and Gore	Stephen Biro
American Guinea Pig: Bloodshock	Marcus Koch
American Guinea Pig: The Song of Solomon	Stephen Biro
American Guinea Pig: Sacrifice	Poison Rouge

== Other Ventures ==
In addition to film distribution and production, Unearthed Films operates several related imprints. Unearthed Books and Comics publishes horror-themed literature and comics, including works by Stephen Biro, such as his memoirs "Hellucination" (2011) and "Dialogue with the Devil" (2013). The company also runs the Unearthed Music Group, which releases music across various genres, including death metal, industrial, speedcore, and horrorcore.

== Reception ==
Unearthed Films has received limited attention from mainstream media. Most of the coverage has focused on the extreme and controversial nature of the titles it distributes, particularly the Japanese "Guinea Pig" series and "A Serbian Film," both of which have faced censorship and bans in multiple countries.

Critics outside the extreme horror niche have often reacted with strong disapproval. British film critic Mark Kermode described "A Serbian Film" as "a nasty piece of exploitation trash." The company’s refusal to cut certain titles for mainstream audiences led it to create a separate line called "Too Extreme for Mainstream," which is sold exclusively through its own website.
