= Benetone Hillin Entertainment =

Thai/American film production company

- Founded: 2011
- Founders: Benetone Films; Hillin Entertainment
- Key people: C.E.O.: Rachvin Narula; C.O.O.: Kulthep Narula; President: Daemon Hillin
- Website: www.benetonehillin.com

Benetone Hillin Entertainment is an international production company with offices in Los Angeles, USA, and Bangkok, Thailand. The two companies, Thailand's largest production service company Benetone Films and US production company Hillin Entertainment had been building a relationship, and in 2011, the two combined to create Benetone Hillin Entertainment.

== About the company ==
In 2011, Benetone Films joined hands with Daemon Hillin, a producer based in Los Angeles, establishing Benetone Hillin Entertainment with an aim to take advantage of the US and Asian filming capabilities to create commercial films for international audiences. The company has produced four films of various genres, which includes two projects directed by Cameron Romero, son of horror icon George Romero, titled Radical (2011), Auteur (2014), A Stranger in Paradise (2013) that had a national theatrical release in the U.S. on February 14, 2014, by Freestyle Digital Media, and the recently concluded production of Pernicious, a supernatural horror film, directed by James Cullen Bressack; slated for release in May/June 2015.

On January 14, 2014, Benetone Hillin Entertainment announced signing up of Gordon Bressack, a three-time, Emmy Award-winning writer of such animated shows as Pinky & The Brain and Animaniacs, for a live-action feature film, Oliver Storm and the Curse of Sinbad's Treasure, slated for the 2015 release. The film will be shot completely in Thailand, and will be written by Gordon Bressack and his son, James Cullen Bressack.

== Filmography ==
- 2008: Bombay to Bangkok
- 2008: Golmaal Returns
- 2010: Toonpur Ka Superrhero
- 2012: Ek Tha Tiger
- 2012: Paramithiasmenes: Hollywood Dream
- 2013: A Stranger in Paradise
- 2014: Auteur
- 2014: Unicorn Zombie Apocalyps
- 2014: Bang Bang!
- 2014: Pernicious
- 2015: The Runaway
- 2015: By the Rivers of Babylon
- 2015: Ghost House
- 2015: Oliver Storm and the Curse of Sinbad's Treasure
- 2016: Miskatonic
- 2016: Baaghi
- 2016: Table 18
- 2018: Race 3
- 2018: Thugs of Hindostan
- 2020: The Forgotten Army – Azaadi Ke Liye
- 2022: Ponniyin Selvan: I
- 2025: Dhurandhar
- 2026: Dhurandhar: The Revenge
