= World of Final Fantasy =

2016 role-playing video game

- Original North American cover art
- Developer: Tose (Note: Production support and oversight by Square Enix Business Division 3.)
- Publisher: Square Enix
- Directors: Hiroki Chiba; Atsushi Isobe
- Producer: Shinji Hashimoto
- Artists: Yasuhisa Izumisawa; Tetsuya Nomura
- Writers: Hiroki Chiba; Sara Okabe; Mayumi Takita
- Composer: Masashi Hamauzu
- Series: Final Fantasy
- Engine: Orochi
- Platforms: PlayStation 4; PlayStation Vita; Windows; Nintendo Switch; Xbox One
- Release: PlayStation 4, PlayStation Vita: NA: October 25, 2016; JP: October 27, 2016; EU: October 28, 2016; Windows: WW: November 21, 2017; Nintendo Switch, Xbox One: WW: November 6, 2018
- Genre: Role-playing
- Mode: Single-player

World of Final Fantasy (Note: Wārudo Obu Fainaru Fantajī (Japanese: ワールド オブ ファイナルファンタジー)) is a role-playing video game developed by Tose and published by Square Enix. It is a spin-off of the Final Fantasy franchise, featuring characters from across its mainline and supplementary entries. Initially released for PlayStation 4 and PlayStation Vita in 2016, it was later ported to Windows in 2017. An updated version, World of Final Fantasy Maxima, was released as a port for Nintendo Switch and Xbox One in 2018, with the PS4 and Windows versions receiving the Maxima update as downloadable content.

The game takes place in Grymoire, a world of coexisting Final Fantasy locations. The story follows siblings Lann and Reynn, who possess the power to tame monsters called Mirages, and are sent to Grymoire to reclaim their lost memories and thwart the plans of the Bahamutian Army. Returning to a more traditional gameplay style from earlier titles, it revolves around turn-based battles which utilize the series' recurring Active Time Battle system, augmented with a stacking mechanic where stacking allied characters and monsters affects statistics and abilities.

Development started around the concept of a Final Fantasy title aimed at a wider and younger audience, focusing on a light tone and stylized graphics compared to the mainline entries. It was directed and written by Hiroki Chiba, who had worked as a scenario writer and event planner for the series. The chibi character designs were created by Yasuhisa Izumisawa; the larger characters were designed by Tetsuya Nomura. The music was composed primarily by Masashi Hamauzu, who also included arranged versions of classic themes with Tose's sound team while aiming for the music to be lighter in tone than his previous work. The Maxima port was created in response to popular demand, though a limited budget meant there was relatively little added content. Both versions of the game run on Silicon Studio's Orochi engine.

First announced at the 2015 Electronic Entertainment Expo, World of Final Fantasy was intended as a celebratory title to commemorate the series' 30th anniversary. A worldwide release was planned from an early stage, with localization running parallel to the development and Japanese voice recording. In order to keep the characters true to their original appearances, the localization staff who first handled them were brought in to translate their dialogue. Reception of the game was generally positive, with many praising its aesthetics and stacking mechanic, but criticism focusing on its slow pace and storyline. Debuting to strong sales in Japan, the original version sold over 900,000 copies worldwide by 2018.

== Gameplay ==
A battle in World of Final Fantasy: Lann and Reynn face a group of Mirages in a dungeon with their allied Mirages. Displayed are the playable characters, battle options and turn order.

World of Final Fantasy is a role-playing video game in which players take control of twin siblings Lann and Reynn as they navigate the world of Grymoire. The world is broken up between safe town environments and dungeons with enemies and puzzles. During their travels, Lann and Reynn befriend various monsters called Mirages that they can utilize both in battle and within the navigable environment: examples of this usage include riding larger Mirages as mounts or using them to navigate environmental puzzles. Another element to both puzzles and combat is the ability of Lann and Reynn to freely change size between normal Jiant forms and chibi-style Lilikin form. A recurring location is Nine Wood Hills, the place where Lann and Reynn start their journey, where they keep and organized unused Mirages, purchase items and access the Coliseum to enter fights and capture unique Mirages.

The game's battle system makes use of the Active Time Battle (ATB) system employed by multiple Final Fantasy games. In battle, players control a party of Mirages which can be stacked upon each other to grant various boons in battle while decreasing the number of turns that can be taken. The party can attack freely, use items, and perform abilities using Action Points (AP). The types of Mirages used affect the party's available skills and abilities in battle. Mirages are captured in battle after they have been sufficiently weakened or a particular sequence of actions is taken, and once in the party can be freely named. In addition to standard Mirages are special Mirages that can be temporarily summoned into battle using a full pool of AP: the Mirage remains in battle, replacing the main party, until either the summoner's AP is depleted or the Mirage's health drops to zero.

Another action accessed from Nine Wood Hills are Intervention Quests, storylines ending in boss fights focusing around character cameos from parts of the Final Fantasy series. Some Intervention Quests include unique minigames, such as fighting through a dungeon or completing a grid-based puzzle. The expanded release World of Final Fantasy Maxima includes several additional features including a New Game+ option, and several alterations to gameplay. A notable addition are Champion Mirajewels, items that allow Lann and Reynn to transform into chibi versions of Final Fantasy protagonist and gain access to unique abilities.

== Synopsis ==
=== Setting ===
World of Final Fantasy begins in a town called Nine Wood Hills, though the story's events are set in the world of Grymoire. Grymoire is a land where multiple locations from earlier Final Fantasy titles, such as Cornelia (Final Fantasy) and Saronia (Final Fantasy III), fuse together and where multiple climates exist side-by-side. The main inhabitants of Grymoire are the chibi-like Lilikins, while its monsters are called Mirages. Lann, Reynn, and others like them are referred to as "Jiants". The inhabitants of Grymoire are drawn from multiple entries in the Final Fantasy series. Rather than being characters drawn from their respective worlds, they are versions that have always lived in the world of Grymoire — these characters have dedicated side stories tying into the main narrative.

=== Characters ===
The main protagonists are twin siblings, Lann and Reynn — Lann is an energetic boy who is prone to act idiotically, while his older sister Reynn is cautious and acts as a foil and counterpart. Both hold the power to capture and control Mirages, and can switch freely between Jiant and Lilikin forms. The siblings are guided through Grymoire by Tama, a mysterious creature who acts as their navigator and teacher. Their mother is revealed to be a legendary figure called Lusse Farna, who saved the world a century before. Lann and Reynn are guided into Grymoire from Nine Wood Hills by Enna Kros, a mysterious figure who acts as the god of Grymoire. The twins are helped from Nine Wood Hills by the pixie Mirage Serafie, who looks after their captured Mirages. They also encounter a mysterious "Masked Woman" with enigmatic aims, and an antagonistic Jiant summoner called Hauyn. The main enemy is the Bahamutian Army, a force of Jiant-like beings who are spreading their influence across the world: they are led by their king Dark Knight Brandelis, his chief tactician Segwarides, and Winged Knight Pellinore.

The Final Fantasy cameo characters, which spans from across the series, include the Warrior of Light and Princess Sarah (Final Fantasy); Refia (Final Fantasy III); Rydia (Final Fantasy IV); Bartz Klauser, Gilgamesh and Faris Scherwiz (Final Fantasy V); Terra Branford, Edgar Roni Figaro and Celes Chere (Final Fantasy VI); Cloud Strife, Tifa Lockhart and Shelke (Final Fantasy VII and its companion media); Squall Leonhart and Quistis Trepe (Final Fantasy VIII); Vivi Ornitier and Eiko Carol (Final Fantasy IX); Rikku, Tidus and Yuna (Final Fantasy X); Shantotto (Final Fantasy XI), Lightning and Snow Villiers (Final Fantasy XIII); and Sherlotta (Final Fantasy Crystal Chronicles: Echoes of Time). The Maxima version includes brief scenarios covering Cecil Harvey (Final Fantasy IV), Zack Fair (Final Fantasy VII), and Serah Farron (Final Fantasy XIII-2).

=== Plot ===
In the world of Nine Wood Hills, Lann and Reynn meet Enna Kros, who reveals they are former Mirage Keepers stripped of their mirages and memories. She opens a portal to the world of Grymoire, where the twins begin recovering their mirages. They discover a power dubbed the Bahamutian Federation—led by Brandelis and his subordinates Segwarides and Pellinore—is forcing other nations into servitude from their hidden base. Lann and Reynn are embroiled in Grymoir's conflicts with the Federation. Prompted by Lann, the twins begin following the steps of the Azure Prophecy, which leads them to seek four elemental keys across Grymoire's lands, and learn that their mother Lady Lusse is a legendary figure who saved Grymoire from catastrophe a century before. They also begin awakening champions, individuals across Grymoire who can resonate with the twins' powers. They are also prodded along by the Masked Woman, and confronted by an angered Hauyn.

The twins eventually learn the full truth. In an attempt to help their mother with her burdens as a summoner, Lann and Reynn stole her powers and summoned Brandelis through a portal called the Ultima Gate. Brandelis, part of a destructive pantheon dubbed the Exnine Knights, killed Lusse and their father Rorrik and used their bodies as vessels for the Exnine Knights Pellinore and Segwarides respectively. Lusse's last act was to send Lann and Reynn to Nine Wood Hills, separating them from Grymoire and stripping them of their memories. With help from another Exnine Knight using the "Masked Woman" as a puppet, Brandelis manipulated the twins into reopening the Ultima Gate, allowing a parasitic race called Cogna to begin consuming Grymoire. Despite Reynn's fears, Lann leads a single-handed attack on Brandelis' fortress. Lann kills both Segwarides and Pellinore, then sacrifices himself to imprison Brandelis after the latter destroys both Hauyn and the dying Lusse and Rorrik. In despair, Reynn retreats with Tama to Nine Wood Hills, which is eventually also invaded by Cogna.

Refusing to accept this ending, Reynn is sent back in time by Tama — in her true form of Tamamohimé — through the sacrifice of her remaining lives. This allows Reynn to alter events, telling Lann and Hauyn about the coming tragedy. Together they form a plan; use the summoners of Grymoire to reverse the Ultima Gate's flow, sending the Cogna and Exnine Knights into the void. The twins continue to help the people of Grymoire, recover their mirages, and revive Tama. Lann, Reynn and Hauyn together with the summoners and their champions then launch a united attack and successfully reverse the Ultima Gate, pulling the Cogna from Grymoire. Lann and Reynn free their parents from the Exnine Knights' control and allow their spirits to pass on, then defeat Brandelis. After he attacks Hauyn, the twins push Brandelis through the Ultima Gate as it closes, giving Hauyn their mirages to safeguard Grymoire. Enna Kros then gives a final "gift", returning versions of Lann and Reynn to Grymoire as champions. A secret ending added in Maxima has Hauyn fighting a Diabolos mirage from another world, while an older and ragged Lann continues to search for a missing Reynn.

== Development ==
World of Final Fantasy was produced and overseen by Business Division 3 of Square Enix, with development handled by Tose. The initial concept for World of Final Fantasy was created between series producer Shinji Hashimoto, and Square Enix staff member Hiroki Chiba. Chiba's previous work on the series had been as a scenario writer and event planner for several titles including Dirge of Cerberus: Final Fantasy VII and Final Fantasy Type-0, titles that had been noted for the dark tone and stories. Hashimoto and Chiba noticed that the series age demographic had shifted to adolescents and adults, with few young people coming to the series. World of Final Fantasy was intended to "lower the threshold" for players so more people could enjoy the series. The original concepts that form part of World of Final Fantasy were created for a simulation video game. When that project ran into difficulties, it was scrapped and its aesthetic elements reused in the smartphone title Pictlogica Final Fantasy.

The gameplay systems deliberately recalled mainline entries prior to Final Fantasy X. The battle system was inspired by the Active Time Battle variants used in the Super Famicom era of the series. Hashimoto was the originator of the monster collection mechanic. The capturing mechanic was included as a parallel to the company's Dragon Quest Monsters subseries. The monster stacking design was decided upon during discussions between Chiba and artist Yasuhisa Izumisawa during early development: Izumisawa had created an illustration showing three different Job classes stacked on top of each other while riding Magitek armor as a joke, and Chiba thought that this would be a nice addition to the combat system. The number of monsters included in the game had to be restricted due to hardware limitations.

Once the gameplay systems had been decided upon, the team needed to consider what hardware could successfully portray it. The game's original platforms, PlayStation 4 and PlayStation Vita, were decided upon by Chiba as he wanted "the power of the former and the portability of the latter". This also enabled use of the two platform's cross-save feature, allowing players to take the game between the two platforms. Despite the varying power of the hardware, the team worked to ensure there were minimal content differences between the two versions. The game used the Orochi 3, which was chosen to help speed development due to its developer-friendly structure.

=== Scenario and art design ===
Concept art created by Yasuhisa Izumisawa: using the chosen super deformed "chibi" artstyle, it provided the inspiration for the game's stacking mechanic.

The scenario was written by Chiba, whose main focus was to create a story that would appealed to young players with comic dialogue, while keeping true to the characters drawn from each Final Fantasy title. The story was written to be similar to early Final Fantasy titles, with the volume meant to be equivalent to Final Fantasy VI, VII and VIII. Its main focus was creating a light-hearted experience while still retaining darker narrative elements associated with the series. Alongside the main narrative, Chiba wrote a novel's worth of additional side content found in optional books and leaflets to add context to the game's world. While not essential, he felt it important to lend depth to Grymoire. The scenario team included Mayumi Takita and Type-0 script writer Sara Okabe. In addition to more traditional character inclusions such as Cloud, Squall and Lightning, less prominent characters such as Eiko and Shelk were included. This was because characters were chosen due to situations in the plot rather than either including every character or choosing only the most popular ones. A cited example was a scene which took place at a port, which was a perfect fit for the pirate captain Faris from Final Fantasy V. Chiba was responsible for all the characters introduced into the title, and turned down multiple characters suggested by staff as they did not fit into the story. The "World" title held multiple meanings: it was at once a Final Fantasy world in its own right, and a world where multiple Final Fantasy titles merged.

The aesthetics were intended to contrast directly with the increasingly realistic graphics of the main series, exemplified by the graphics and character design of Final Fantasy XIII. The characters were redesigned in a super deformed chibi style to better reinforce the series' "cute" aspect. The chibi designs and their contrast with realistic designs, originally created for the cancelled simulation video game, were used at Chiba's insistence. To create these new designs, Chiba and Hashimoto brought in Izumisawa, who had worked on the Crystal Chronicles subseries and enjoyed creating cute character designs. Many of the chibi designs were drawn from those used in Pictlogica Final Fantasy, a title which Chiba had worked on as scenario writer. The Jiant characters were designed by veteran Final Fantasy artist Tetsuya Nomura. Nomura was brought in so that his designs would draw the attention of established series fans. Numerous guest artists contributed Mirage and character designs including Yūsuke Kozaki, Yuji Himukai, Shirow Miwa, Yusuke Iwasa, Ryota Murayama and Taiki.

The initial idea for the protagonists was for them to share the chibi art design of the rest of the cast, but Chiba felt that this would weaken the game as it did not represent the "sweet and sour" aspects of the series. Nomura's designs were a hybrid of his work on Final Fantasy and his more cartoon-like character designs for the Kingdom Hearts series. Many monster designs were based on series artwork created for earlier entries by Yoshitaka Amano: Amano also designed the game's logo, using the concept of a large number of monsters fighting alongside the main characters. There were also new monster designs created by both Izumisawa and Nomura. Izumisawa was key to smoothing out the differences in how each monster had been portrayed by different artists across the series, creating images which epitomized their most iconic features. Nomura supervised character modelling, even down to small facial details, and was regularly consulted by Chiba on how each character should move and speak in-game, so as to keep their personalities and presence intact which still serving the narrative. The anime sequences were produced by studio Creators in Pack, with Yasuhiro Imagawa acting as animation director. The true ending credits movie was created by Visual Works, Square Enix's in-house CGI studio.

=== Music ===
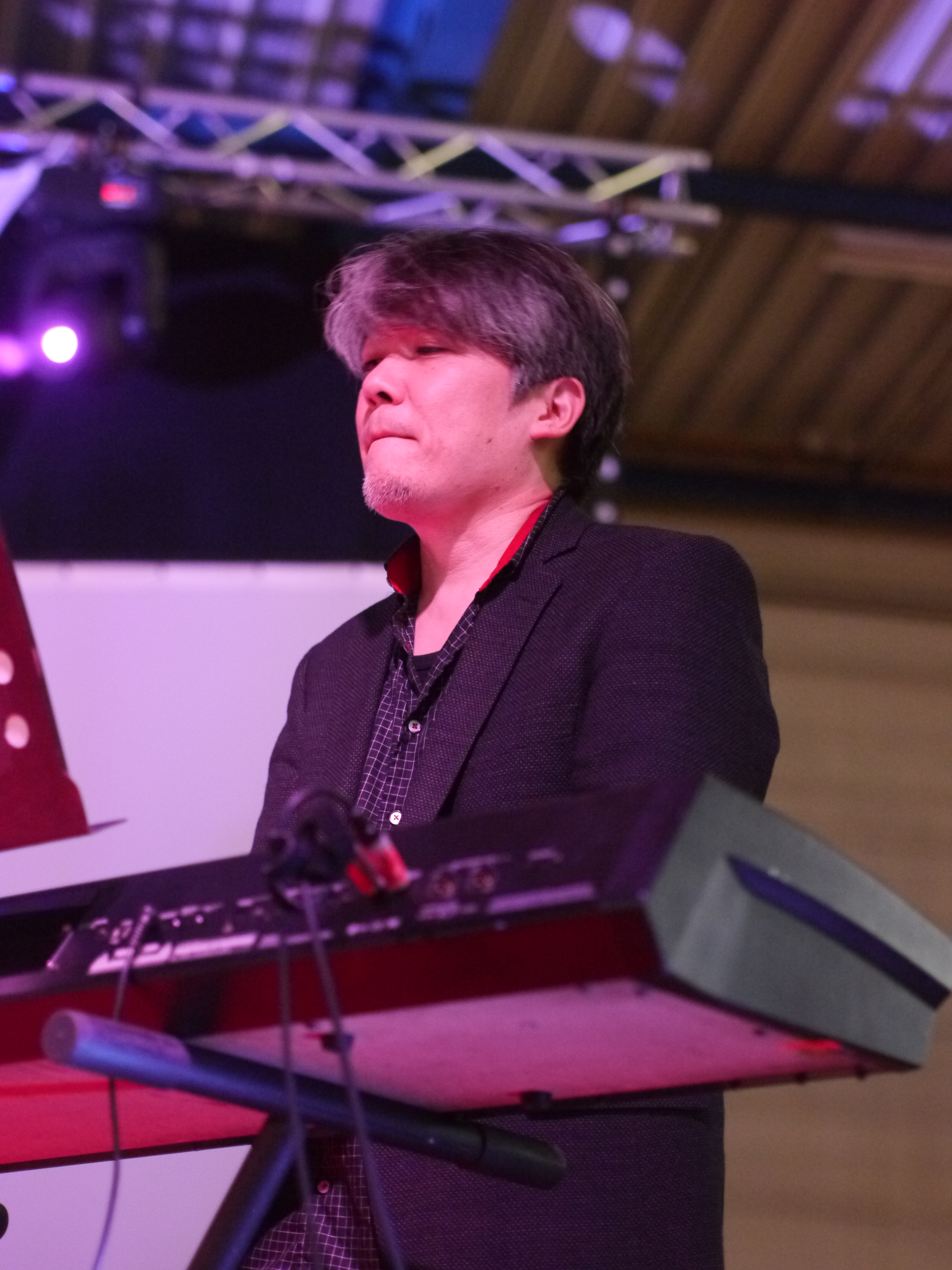
Hamauzu (pictured 2012) co-composed the soundtrack, creating lighter-toned themes than his other work.

The game's soundtrack was primarily composed and arranged by Masashi Hamauzu, with other contributions from Shingo Kataoka, Hayata Takeda, and Takashi Honda, consisting of nearly one hundred tracks. Hamauzu was assisted by Tose's sound team, including co-composer Kataoka. German pianist Benyamin Nuss, who had performed other Hamauzu and Final Fantasy pieces on the Distant Worlds concerts and Symphonic Fantasies tribute album, performed piano on the soundtrack. Vocals for the soundtrack were performed by Mina Sakai, a vocalist who had worked with Hamauzu on Final Fantasy XIII and formed part of his musical group Imeruat. Chiba wanted a composer who was synonymous with the Final Fantasy series, and although he initially considered Nobuo Uematsu, he settled on Hamauzu due to an earlier positive working relationship between them. Hamuzu created an estimated 10% of the songs before their setting was decided, including the theme for Nine Wood Hills.

In contrast to Hamauzu's previous work, which was noted for its darker themes and motifs, the music for World of Final Fantasy was intended to be lightweight, allowing him to approach it more positively than previous projects. Chiba requested twelve unique battle themes from Hamauzu. Due to space limitations, the battle themes were fairly short. In addition to original music, Hamauzu and the Tose music staff were in charge of doing several new arrangements of classic themes. The keyword for arrangements was "toy box", a version for a younger audience that would retain the original theme's elements. The arrangements covered work by Hamauzu, Uematsu, Kumi Tanioka and Mitsuto Suzuki.

One of the earliest completed tracks that set the tone for remixes was Kataoka's melody for the opening town Cornelia, a setting from the first Final Fantasy. Many of the challenges came to fitting arrangements to the planned settings, with some themes requiring altered time signatures without changing the melody. One arrangement both Hamauzu and Tose staff were nervous about was the arrangement of "Blinded by Light", a theme created by Hamauzu for Final Fantasy XIII. Hamauzu's work was the subject of constant oversight, with other leading staff making sure his music fitted different scenes, and requesting changes when they did not; this checking was motivated by the wish to pay respect to the original characters. Hamauzu cited World of Final Fantasy as a refreshing project compared to his earlier darker-themed work.

The opening theme, titled "Innocent²", was composed by Ryo Yamazaki and performed by Japanese singer Aoi "Mizuki" Mizu. Chiba brought Yamazaki on board, having worked with him several times. The ending themes were created by members of music company Noisycroak, and supervised by Yamazaki. The bad ending theme, "Silent World", was composed by Ryusuke Fujioka and sung by Tama's voice actress Ayana Taketatsu. The true ending theme, titled "World Parade", was composed by Ryo Shirasawa of Noisycroak and performed by Taketatsu, Kana Hanazawa (Enna Kros) and Eri Kitamura (Serafie). Hamauzu originally assumed the songs would be either English for all regions or dubbed into English for the Western release, but due to Western fans liking Japanese lyrics, the songs were kept unchanged between regions. The lyrics, in addition to song titles, were written in simple language so people of all ages could read and understand them.

== Release ==
The game was first revealed to the public at the 2015 Electronic Entertainment Expo. At the time of its reveal, the game was said to be 30-40% complete. In addition to drawing new fans into the series, its release was intended to be a celebration of the series to commemorate its 30th anniversary. This meant that its ultimate release date was decided early on. The title was released in October 2016 worldwide: on October 25 in North America, on October 27 in Japan, and on October 28 in Europe. It was supplemented in Japan by a guidebook, published by Square Enix on November 26. A port of the game to Windows via Steam was released on November 21, 2017. The port featured limited graphics options and was locked to thirty frames per second, but came with several cheats including free AP, max money and items, and disabling random encounters.

The Western release of the game was planned from an early stage, as the team wanted to deliver the experience to fans across the world. Localization was an arduous task, as the team wanted to preserve as much of the Japanese version's tone and style as possible. As Chiba wanted the guest Final Fantasy characters to sound consistent with their canon appearances from across the series, the original localization leads were brought in to help translate the dialogue so as to retain each character's recognized nuances. Some terms were difficult for the team to localize, such as "Nosenose" and "falling apart", Japanese terms related to the stacking mechanic. English dubbing ran almost parallel to the Japanese voice recording, which lasted around ten to eleven months.

In the West, several editions were created outside the standard original release; all versions featured in-game extras of additional mirages and the Japanese dub. A Day One edition featured only this content. A Limited Edition included unique art book and a 24-page art book. A limited Collector's Edition was released exclusively through the Western Square Enix store; the edition featured the original soundtrack, an 80-page art book, and figurines. Final Fantasy VII antagonist Sephiroth was included in first print copies in Japan, and as part of the special editions in the West. Sephiroth' summoning video was created by Visual Works. The original game received limited-time downloadable content (DLC) later that year giving players a Champion Medal summon of Sora, lead protagonist of the Kingdom Hearts series. Later free DLC in March 2017 provided a Champion Medal of Balthier, a protagonist from Final Fantasy XII.

=== World of Final Fantasy: Meli-Melo ===
A mobile spin-off, World of Final Fantasy Meli-Melo, (Note: Wārudo Obu Fainaru Fantajī Meri-Mero (ワールド オブ ファイナルファンタジー メリメロ)) was released in Japan on December 12, 2017, for Android and iOS devices. The game is set in Valgallan, one of the worlds created by Enna Kros which is threatened with destruction, and follows the player character as they befriend Mirages and fend off the forces attacking Valgallan. The gameplay is similar to that of the main game, though adapted for a mobile platform, and features multiple characters in Lilikin form. The game was free-to-play and monetized itself via a gacha mechanic. Meli-Melo was shut down on December 13, 2018.

A mobile title based around World of Final Fantasy was always planned, but the team decided to finish production on the main game first, then use its assets to create a mobile spin-off to save on budget. Square Enix's partnered with Drecom to both develop and run the game. The gameplay and story theme was "casual", aiming it at younger modern audiences. The original game's artists were brought back to design new Mirages. The game's title "méli-mélo" was suggested by Nomura; a French term meaning a "mishmash" or "hodgepodge", it was said to suit the game's premise and tone. For the music, Yamazaki was brought back to create a new version of "Innocent", which Chiba considered the theme tune of the series.

=== World of Final Fantasy Maxima ===
World of Final Fantasy Maxima is an expanded version of the original game, released worldwide on November 6, 2018, for Nintendo Switch, Xbox One, PS4 and Windows. Maxima was made available as paid DLC for the PS4 and Windows version. Maxima includes new narrative elements, gameplay additions, new boss fights, search options for treasure chests and other elements, adjustments to capturing mirages, short narratives featuring new characters, a new ending, and most of the original DLC. In addition to these characters, the Champion Mirajewels included Firion (Final Fantasy II), and Y'shtola (Final Fantasy XIV). Final Fantasy XV protagonist Noctis Lucis Caelum appears as part of a fishing minigame and as a Champion Mirajewel. The opening movie of Meli-Melo was also included in the game's theater mode.

Tose returned to develop Maxima along with Square Enix's Business Division 3, and the game used the latest version of the Orochi engine. Due to the original's success, Chiba wanted to port the game to new systems, and decided to add new content as an incentive. The "Maxima" subtitle was suggested by Nomura in reference to it being the greatest version of the game. The new features were decided upon based on feedback from the player base. A Switch port was planned for the original, but internal and technological issues prevented it. The Xbox One version was insisted on by Chiba to reach a wider audience overseas, and used the Windows version as its base. The upgrade was so large that it was not released for the Vita due to its size limitations. Maxima was produced in a fairly limited budget, which presented issues both with the content possible and recording voices for the new character scenarios.

The Champion Mirajewels were the result of fan demands to play as Final Fantasy characters. Noctis's inclusion and minigame was due to Chiba, who got assets from Final Fantasy XV for Noctis's fishing rods. Chiba considered creating a dedicated scenario, but decided upon a fishing minigame following the release of the spin-off title Monster of the Deep. New Mirages were both created for the port, and added in from Meli-Melo. Zack and Serah were chosen due to their close respective relationships with Cloud and Snow. Characters wanted by Chiba but ultimately dropped include the character Hilderbrand from Final Fantasy XIV, and supporting character Aranea Highwind from Final Fantasy XV. Other dropped concepts were reworking Lann's dialogue to remove puns, and having commentary from the central cast. The latter was dropped as it made the narrative too metafictional. The secret ending was included to tease a possible sequel; Chiba already had the scenario for a sequel written out, ready to produce it if there was enough demand.

== Reception ==
Reception

Aggregate scores
Aggregator	Score
Metacritic	PS4: 77/100; VITA: 77/100; PC: 77/100; NS: 79/100; PS4 (Maxima): 71/100; XONE: 81/100
OpenCritic	46% recommend(Maxima) (Note: Based on 27 reviews)

Review scores
Publication	Score
Destructoid	7/10
Electronic Gaming Monthly	7/10
Famitsu	36/40
Game Informer	8.25/10
GameSpot	6/10
GamesRadar+	3/5
IGN	7/10
Nintendo World Report	8/10
PC Zone	63/100
Polygon	7/10
RPGamer	2.5/5

World of Final Fantasy received "generally favorable" reviews, according to video game review aggregator Metacritic.

Meghan Sullivan of IGN wrote: "World of Final Fantasy is a humorous adventure that is just too cute for words, but its combat and exploration aren't diverse enough to support a campaign nearly as long as this one. However, I did enjoy it for a long time - more than 30 hours - before it wore out its welcome". Heidi Kemps of GameSpot was more critical to the game: "Unfortunately, you have to put up with a fair amount of frustration and filler before you get to enjoy the best of what World of Final Fantasy has to offer, namely charming writing and Final Fantasy fan service. If you're willing to put up with some of the game's mundane sequences, you'll get some enjoyment out of it, but if you're not a Final Fantasy fanatic, the magic in these moments may be lost altogether".

The PS4 version debuted at number 3 on the Japanese sales charts, with 53,176 copies sold. The Vita version debuted at number 4, with 47,159 copies sold. The total came to over 100,000 units sold during its first week across both versions. By late November, the Vita version was the only version to remain in the top ten. Its total Japanese sales by 2017 totalled over 200,000 units. In the United Kingdom, it charted at #11 after its first week of retail sales. By 2018, the original version of the game had sold 900,000 copies worldwide, which Chiba considered a success.
