= Slobodan Beštić =

Serbian actor (born 1964)

Slobodan Beštić (Serbian: Слободан Бештић; born 27 March 1964 in Pančevo, Serbia) is a Serbian actor. A prolific stage actor, he is perhaps best known for his critically acclaimed and versatile repertoire as a drama champion at the National Theatre in Belgrade.

== Biography ==
Beštić studied at the Faculty of Dramatic Arts of the University of Arts in Belgrade and graduated in 1987. The young actor started his career at the Yugoslav Drama Theater in the same year, then he changed to Belgrade's National Theatre in 2001, which he belongs since then as a member of the ensemble. He has been teaching at the Faculty of Contemporary Arts of the University Business Academy Novi Sad since 2015.

He participated in several acting seminars from 1992 to 2000 in the context of Eugenio Barba's Theatre Laboratory at the Odin Theatre, at the International School of Theatre Anthropology, at the DAH Theater Center Belgrade, the REX Cultural Center Belgrade, the University of Birmingham and others.

He provided the voice of Lord Dingwall in the Serbian dub of Brave (2012).
