= T Street =

T Street may refer to:

- T-Street, a beach in San Clemente, California
- T-Streets, an artist signed to Young Money Entertainment record label
- T-Street Productions, an American film and television production company

== See also ==
- Search for "T Street"
