= Sheps =

Sheps is a surname. Notable people with the surname include:

- Jesse Ray Sheps (born 2005), American actor and musician
- Mindel C. Sheps (1913–1973), Canadian physician, biostatistician, and demographer
- Simcha Sheps (1908–1998), American Orthodox rabbi
