= Adam Carter Rehmeier =

American filmmaker

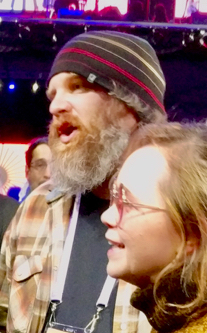
- Adam Carter Rehmeier (left) at 2020 Sundance next to Emily Skeggs
- Born: Nebraska City, Nebraska, U.S.
- Education: Columbia College Chicago
- Occupations: Film; screenwriter; cinematographer
- Years active: 2001–present

Adam Carter Rehmeier is an American film director, writer and cinematographer best known for his coming of age films Dinner in America and Snack Shack.

== Early life ==
Rehmeier grew up in Nebraska City, Nebraska, the son of District Judge Randall Rehmeier. As a teenager in the early 1990s he worked the snack shack at Steinhart Park Pool in the Missouri River community, an experience he would later write into his film Snack Shack.

He attended Columbia College in Chicago where he studied film with a cinematography concentration. He began working as a documentary camera operator, shooting low-budget feature films and documenting the touring jam band Phish.

== Career ==
In 2008, Adam Rehmeier and actress Rodleen Getsic co-directed the torture porn film The Bunny Game. The film follows a sex worker (played by Getsic) who is abducted by a sadistic truck driver who commits sexual violence against her. The film was shot in black and white over 13 days on a budget of $13,000. In addition to co-directing, Rehmeier acted as both cinematographer and editor. The film was released in 2010 and was subsequently banned in the United Kingdom after the British Board of Film Classification refused to classify it due to its graphic scenes of sexual and physical abuse. Despite its controversy, the film showed at over 40 film festivals internationally and was distributed in seven territories.

Rehmeier followed up The Bunny Game with Jonas, a film that has been cited as being a companion piece. A parable in six verses, the film follows Jonas (Gregg Gilmore), a man who washes up on the California coastline and travels around Los Angeles, going door-to-door to spread his message.

Dinner in America was Rehmeier's third film and after its release attained cult status, partially thanks to John Waters listing it as one of his favorite films of 2022 in Artforum after its world premiere at the Sundance Film Festival. The story follows a relationship between a neurodivergent girl (Emily Skeggs) and an anarchist punk (Kyle Gallner). Due to the film's initial release falling during the COVID-19 pandemic, it struggled to find an audience; however, it became popular on TikTok in 2024 and was able to drum up interest for a delayed theatrical run.

In 2022, Rehmeier began working on the semi-autobiographical film Snack Shack, which is loosely based on his own childhood experience in Nebraska City. MRC, Paperclip Limited, and T-Street produced the film. The film had a limited theatrical release in March 2024 by Republic Pictures. It received generally positive reviews from critics.

== Filmography ==
Year	Title	Director	Writer	Cinematographer	Editor
2011	The Bunny Game	Yes	Yes	Yes	Yes
2013	Jonas	Yes	Yes	Yes	Yes
2020	Dinner in America	Yes	Yes	No	Yes
2024	Snack Shack	Yes	Yes	No	No
2026	Carolina Caroline	Yes	No	No	No
