= Dinner in America =

2020 film by Adam Carter Rehmeier

- Theatrical release poster
- Directed by: Adam Carter Rehmeier
- Written by: Adam Carter Rehmeier
- Produced by: Nicholas Weinstock; Ross Putman; David Hunter; John Covert; Sam Slater
- Starring: Kyle Gallner; Emily Skeggs; Griffin Gluck; Pat Healy; Mary Lynn Rajskub; David Yow; Hannah Marks; Nick Chinlund; Lea Thompson
- Cinematography: Jean-Philippe Bernier
- Edited by: Adam Carter Rehmeier
- Music by: John Swihart
- Production companies: PSH Collective; Bee-Hive; Burn Later Productions; High Frequency Entertainment; Atlas Industries; Covert Creative Group
- Distributed by: Best & Final Releasing
- Release dates: January 24, 2020 (Sundance); May 27, 2022 (United States)
- Running time: 108 minutes
- Country: United States
- Language: English

Dinner in America is a 2020 American coming-of-age dark comedy film written, directed, and edited by Adam Carter Rehmeier. It stars Kyle Gallner, Emily Skeggs, Griffin Gluck, Pat Healy, Mary Lynn Rajskub, David Yow, Hannah Marks, Nick Chinlund, and Lea Thompson. The plot follows a punk rock singer (Gallner) on the run from the police and a young woman (Skeggs) obsessed with his band who unexpectedly cross paths.

The film premiered at the Sundance Film Festival on January 24, 2020, earning critical acclaim for its energy and the performances of the leads. After struggling to find distribution, it was self-released in the United States on May 27, 2022. In 2024, the film developed a cult following after being rediscovered and gaining popularity on TikTok, leading to a second theatrical run.

== Plot ==
A reckless young man, Simon, goes home with Beth, after both are expelled from a paid clinical trial. After he and Beth's mother are caught kissing, she claims Simon assaulted her, and he lights the family's front yard on fire before fleeing.

Meanwhile, track athletes Derrick and Brandon bully Patty, an awkward 20-year-old who works at a pet store. During dinner with her overprotective parents, Norman and Connie, and brother Kevin, she is unsuccessful in asking for permission to attend a rock show with her friends, Sissy and Karen. For the past two years, Patty has been sending letters containing masturbatory photos and love poems to John Q, the ski mask-wearing lead singer of her favorite punk rock band PSYOPS, who will be playing next week with the Alliance, a more commercial band.

A police officer spots the wanted Simon and gives chase. Simon crosses paths with Patty, who recognizes him from a college course on music appreciation and helps him evade the police. Having just been fired from the pet store by the owner, Mr. Hanley, Patty takes him back to her place, where he flirts with her, but she struggles to react. At dinner with her family, Simon claims to be a Christian missionary in need of a place to stay for the week, to which Norman and Connie acquiesce. He uses prayer to inform Kevin he is adopted, aggravating him.

Patty tells Simon about her fascination for John Q. Simon, secretly John Q and shocked to learn the letters and photos he had been receiving were from Patty, sneaks out and confronts his bandmates for scheduling the show with the Alliance without his knowledge. He returns to Patty's house, Kevin tackles him, and he gives Kevin marijuana to reduce his hostility.

The next day, Derrick and Brandon encounter Simon and Patty and beat up Simon. Enraged, Simon retrieves a dead cat from Patty's front yard before tracking down Derrick and Brandon. Patty acts provocatively to distract them as Simon knocks them unconscious, strips them, burns their tracksuits, places the dead cat on their bodies, and takes several Polaroid photos of the scene. The smoke alerts the other track athletes, who find them as Simon and Patty drive away.

They find a new employee working at the pet store. Patty angrily confronts Mr. Hanley, who claimed he would perform her previous duties, and she and Simon demand he pay an overdue paycheck. They eat lunch at a fast-food restaurant, where they kiss. After they spend the rest of the day on a date at an arcade, Patty thanks Simon for "the best day ever".

The following day, Simon takes Patty to the basement of his mother's house. He tells her that he is John Q and proves it by returning her letters. He praises her love poems, calling them "brilliant power pop songs". They have sex and later record a song, with her singing his favorite poem as lyrics, which brings him to tears. Simon's family arrives home and begrudgingly invites the pair to dinner.

When the family criticizes Simon and accuses him of being a drug addict, Patty confronts them, but they mistake her awkwardness for drug use. As tensions escalate, Simon damages a display cabinet, and the family throws them both out. Patty asks Simon if he thinks she has a mental disability, to which he tells her to stop undervaluing herself because she is a "total punk rocker".

When Simon tells a music manager that he refuses to play with the Alliance, his bandmates allow the manager to turn him in for the reward as recompense for breaking the agreement. Simon takes Patty to a "secret" rock show, where he sings one of her favorite songs, "Dinner in America", and dedicates the performance to her. The police arrest Simon as Sissy and Karen notice Patty kissing him. The impressed friends invite Patty to start a riot grrrl band.

Some time later, Patty reads a letter from the imprisoned Simon that includes a nude photo of him. She punches a bully who calls her an ableist slur, walks away, puts on a ski mask, and listens to the song she recorded with Simon.

== Cast ==
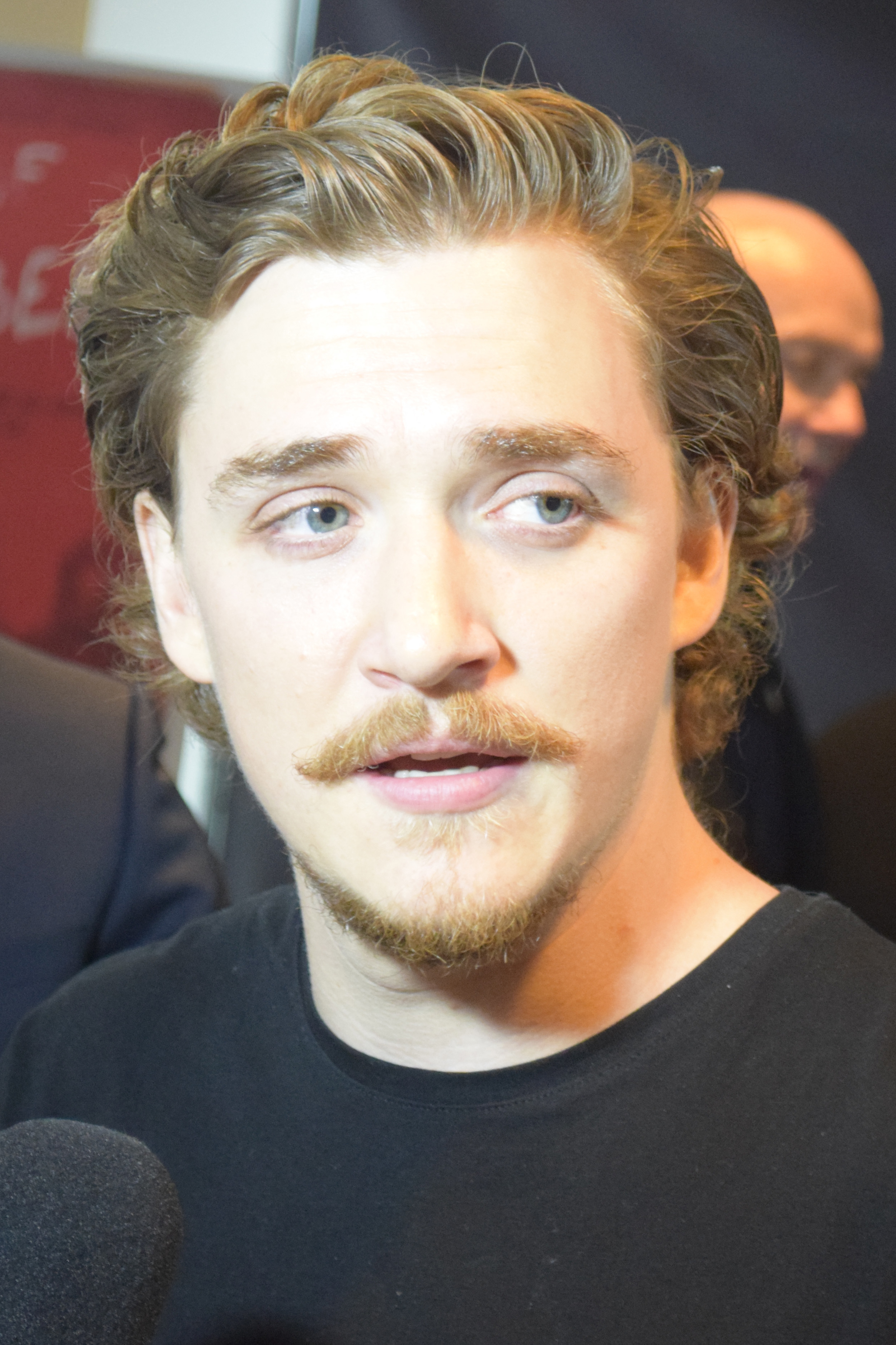
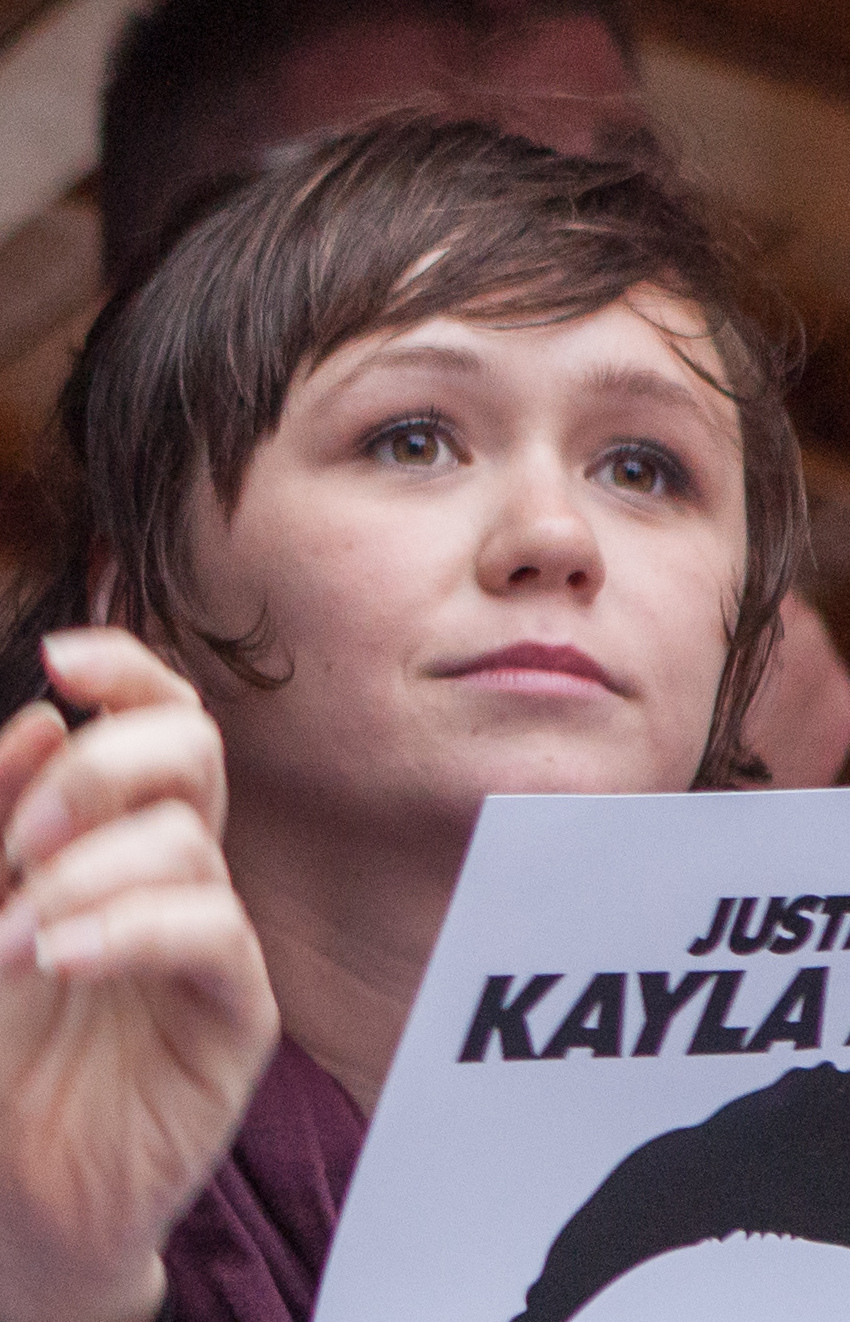
Co-stars Kyle Gallner (left) and Emily Skeggs
- Kyle Gallner as Simon/John Q, a punk rock singer
- Emily Skeggs as Patty, a young and awkward college dropout
- Griffin Gluck as Kevin, Patty's brother
- Pat Healy as Norman, Patty's father
- Mary Lynn Rajskub as Connie, Patty's mother
- David Yow as Eddie Sorvino, the Alliance's music manager
- Hannah Marks as Beth
- Nick Chinlund as Bill, Beth's father
- Lea Thompson as Betty, Beth's mother
- Nico Greetham as Derrick
- Jennifer Prediger as Renae, Simon's sister
- Ryan Malgarini as Danny, Simon's brother
- Sean Rogers as Bobby, Beth's brother
- Lukas Jacob as Brandon
- Sidi Henderson as Mr. Hanley, pet store owner
- Sam Urich as Seth, PSYOPS's guitarist
- Jack Urich as Morgan, PSYOPS's bassist
- Matty Menard as Donovan, PSYOPS's drummer
- Maryann Nagel as Nancy, Simon's mother
- Maxfield Lund as Allen, Simon's brother-in-law
- Brittany Sheets as Sissy
- Sophie Bolen as Karen

== Production ==
The concept for the film originated from two sketches by writer-director Adam Carter Rehmeier. The first sketch, Kicks (2006), centered entirely around Simon's time volunteering for clinical trials to pay for his punk records. Rehmeier wrote the second sketch, Dinner in America, around 2009, and took a more comedic approach that focused on Patty's family as they ate dinner. When he saw they were not working independently, he combined the stories together sometime between 2013 and 2014, and the idea for the film came to fruition. Rehmeier said the film drew inspiration from the characters of Dawn Wiener in Welcome to the Dollhouse (1995) and the title character in Napoleon Dynamite (2004): "I wouldn't say they were really direct [influences]. I think really it came down to writing things that weren't going anywhere and just having like a lot of marinating over a long period of time."

The screenplay was noticed by filmmaker Danny Leiner who, initially interested in directing, noticed Rehmeier's vision and came on board the project as a producer. The ensemble cast, including leads Kyle Gallner and Emily Skeggs, was announced in September 2018. Two weeks of rehearsals were held before filming began in and around Metro Detroit, Michigan. Locations included Southfield, Farmington, Hamtramck, and the campus of Oakland University. Leiner died by the time production had concluded in 2018; the film is dedicated to his memory. Ben Stiller and Nicky Weinstock are credited in the end credits as producers as well. Leiner said he was thankful for their guidance, especially since Weinstock was on set the entire time. Skeggs, who plays Patty, said musician Ezra Furman was a major inspiration for her performance. Original songs for the film were constructed ahead of filming during pre-production. The score was composed by John Swihart. Skeggs and Rehmeier wrote the song "Watermelon" in one day during the two weeks of rehearsals before shooting. The punk songs in the film were written by the band Disco Assault.

== Release ==
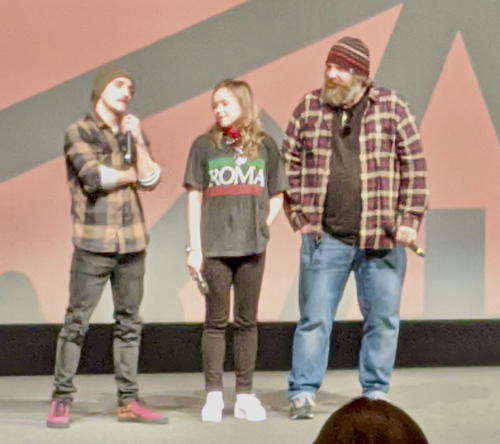
Gallner, Skeggs, and Rehmeier at the Sundance Film Festival screening

The film premiered at the Sundance Film Festival on January 24, 2020, as part of the U.S. Dramatic Competition. It left Sundance without securing a buyer and struggled to find distribution, having to continue its festival run with virtual screenings because of the COVID-19 pandemic. As a result, it was self-released in select theaters in the United States on May 27, 2022, by Best & Final Releasing, and on video-on-demand two weeks later on June 7.

In September 2024, clips and posts about the film and its original song "Watermelon" (performed by Skeggs) began to go viral on the social media platform TikTok. It quickly developed a cult following, trending on the streaming service Hulu, the social cataloging app Letterboxd, and Google. Shortly after, screenings of the film were announced after an online grassroots campaign garnered momentum. The Frida Cinema in Santa Ana, California, was one of the first theaters to establish a screening in response to a plethora of fan requests, selling out in under 24 hours. The IFC Center in Manhattan similarly played the movie to a 400-person audience in November. After successful first screenings, theaters added more, driving other locations to decide to host, like the Prince Charles Cinema in the United Kingdom. The theatrical run continued into 2025, with Laemmle Theatres screening it in multiple Los Angeles cinemas in February.

== Reception ==
=== Critical response ===
On the review aggregator website Rotten Tomatoes, 91% of 75 critics' reviews are positive, with an average rating of 7.9/10. The website's consensus reads: "Rounded out by a pair of satisfying performances, Dinner in America is a coming-of-age rom-com with infectious punk rock energy." Metacritic, which uses a weighted average, assigned the film a score of 80 out of 100, based on 8 critics, indicating "generally favorable" reviews.

Lorry Kikta of Film Threat hailed the performances from the ensemble cast as "fantastic" and said the screenplay was "hilarious and ingenious." Dennis Harvey of Variety called the film "surreal" and described Gallner's portrayal as "a knockout lead performance."

=== Accolades ===
Accolades received by Dinner in America
Award	Date of ceremony	Category	Recipient(s)	Result	Ref.
Dublin International Film Festival	March 15, 2021	Jury Prize	Kyle Gallner	Won	
Fantasporto	May 31, 2021	Best Screenplay	Adam Carter Rehmeier	Won	
Guanajuato International Film Festival	May 8, 2020	Best Film	Dinner in America	Nominated	
Neuchâtel International Fantastic Film Festival	July 14, 2020	Best Film	Dinner in America	Won	
Odesa International Film Festival	May 10, 2020	Grand Prix – International Competition	Adam Carter Rehmeier	Won	
Sundance Film Festival	February 1, 2020	Grand Prix – International Competition	Adam Carter Rehmeier	Nominated	
Tallinn Black Nights Film Festival	November 27, 2020	Rebels with a Cause Award	Dinner in America	Won (Note: Tied with La Verónica)	
