= Snack Shack =

2024 film by Adam Rehmeier

- Theatrical release poster
- Directed by: Adam Carter Rehmeier
- Written by: Adam Carter Rehmeier
- Produced by: Jordan Foley
- Starring: Conor Sherry; Gabriel LaBelle; Mika Abdalla; David Costabile; Nick Robinson
- Cinematography: Jean-Philippe Bernier
- Edited by: Justin Krohn
- Music by: Keegan DeWitt
- Production companies: MRC; Paperclip Limited; T-Street
- Distributed by: Republic Pictures
- Release dates: March 13, 2024 (Nebraska City); March 15, 2024 (United States)
- Running time: 112 minutes
- Country: United States
- Language: English
- Budget: $4.5 million
- Box office: $455,708

Snack Shack is a 2024 American coming-of-age comedy film written and directed by Adam Carter Rehmeier. Set in the summer of 1991, it stars Conor Sherry and Gabriel LaBelle as a pair of teenage friends working at a community pool snack shack in Nebraska City. Mika Abdalla portrays a newcomer lifeguard who disrupts the friend duo's summer plans. Gillian Vigman, David Costabile, and Nick Robinson play supporting roles. The film's plot is semi-autobiographical, being loosely based on Rehmeier's childhood experience in Nebraska City. MRC, Paperclip Limited, and T-Street produced the film.

Snack Shack received a limited theatrical release in the United States on March 15, 2024, by Republic Pictures. It received generally positive reviews from critics.

== Plot ==
In 1991, 14-year-old friends A.J. Carter and Moose Miller pursue various money-making schemes such as betting on dog races and brewing their own beer to sell to classmates at parties in their small town of Nebraska City. When their parents shut down their beer-making operation, they look for summer jobs. Shane Workman, an older friend and Army vet back home from the Gulf War, tells them that the snack shack at the local community pool where he works as a lifeguard is up for summer rental, and the pair set their sights on obtaining the rights to run the shack themselves.

The boys overbid on the rights at a city council auction using money from A.J.'s college savings. A.J.'s parents, the Judge and Jean, are disappointed in how their son has spent his money, but A.J. vows that he will be able to pay them back with money earned through the Snack Shack. A.J. and Moose open the Snack Shack for business, and it is immediately successful, making over $1,600 in revenue on its first day of operation.

A teen girl named Brooke moves in next door to A.J. She is the daughter of a military man and is only in town until he is reassigned. She teases A.J. about his allergies while he mows his parents' lawn and has a hobby of spontaneously photographing people, including A.J. He becomes infatuated with Brooke and helps her get a job as a lifeguard at the pool. When Moose meets Brooke, he, too, becomes smitten with her. As the more aggressive of the two friends, Moose asks Brooke out, and during a double date, A.J. is dismayed to see Moose and Brooke kissing. At work, tensions between Moose and A.J. grow, as does their increasingly heated conflict with a pair of bullies, steroid addict wrestler brothers Randy and Rodney Carmichael.

A.J. relies on Shane for advice about dating and life in general. He and A.J. make plans to go on a hiking trip to Alaska next summer. A.J. is able to get back in his parents' good graces by paying the money he owes and getting concert tickets. Meanwhile, Brooke, who is more interested in A.J., becomes closer to him. She invites A.J. to hang out one night, and they head to a party in the town's empty movie theater. Moose sees A.J. with Brooke, but before he can confront his friend, police arrive to break up the party, and the teens run for places to hide. Brooke, A.J., and Moose hide behind the movie screen. A claustrophobic Moose nearly gives the teens away to the cops, but Brooke silences the boys by grabbing their genitals.

The next day at the Snack Shack, Moose tries to spite A.J. by lying that Brooke gave him a handjob behind the movie screen. This lie upsets A.J., who leaves work early. Shane tries to lift A.J.'s spirits by assuring him that Brooke is genuinely interested in him and is just waiting for him to make a move. At a party that night, A.J. kisses Brooke, and she reciprocates. Moose witnesses the kiss and abruptly leaves, with A.J. chasing after him. When A.J. catches up, Moose punches A.J. in the face. A.J. and Moose thereafter neglect the Snack Shack to avoid each other, leaving the Carmichaels to trash the Shack in their absence. When A.J. finds Moose cleaning up after the vandalism, the pair agree to separate their shifts.

One afternoon, A.J. and Brooke are about to consummate their attraction to each other when they are interrupted by A.J.'s father, the Judge, who has upsetting news. Shane was killed in a car accident. A.J. and Moose's shared grief brings them back together, and the two begin planning out their next summer, which includes the Snack Shack. Brooke grieves with them, but soon afterward, her father is reassigned, and she must leave Nebraska City and A.J. for Germany. Brooke gives A.J. a personalized hanky for his allergies and a photograph she took of A.J. and Shane together as a parting gift. As Brooke leaves, A.J. and the Judge share a beer and a tender moment on their front porch.

== Cast ==
- Conor Sherry as A.J. Carter, a teenager in Nebraska City
- Gabriel LaBelle as Moose Miller, a teenager in Nebraska City
- Mika Abdalla as Brooke, a pool lifeguard
- Nick Robinson as Shane Workman, A.J.'s friend
- David Costabile as Judge Carter, A.J.'s father
- Gillian Vigman as Jean Carter, A.J.'s mother
- June Gentry as Chrissy Carter, A.J.'s sister
- April Clark as Leah, A.J.'s next-door neighbor and Brooke's cousin
- Michael Bonini as Randy Carmichael
- Christian James as Rodney Carmichael
- J. D. Evermore as Bill Workman, Shane's father
- Steve Berg as Lester "Les" Miller, Moose's father
- Kate Robertson Pryor as Sherry Miller, Moose's mother

== Production ==
=== Development ===
Director Adam Carter Rehmeier based the premise of the film on his boyhood experience of operating the Steinhart Park Pool snack shack in his hometown of Nebraska City, Nebraska.

Conor Sherry, then a student at the University of California, Los Angeles, was cast from a self-taped audition in a hotel room while he was isolating with COVID-19. Gabriel LaBelle was cast for the movie in 2022 during production of the Steven Spielberg film The Fabelmans, which he starred in as Sammy Fabelman, a character loosely based on Spielberg.

=== Filming ===
The six-week filming schedule of Snack Shack began in Nebraska City on July 25, 2022. The movie was supported by a $200,000 grant from the Nebraska state government and filming occurred entirely within the state. Supplemental locations included the Pioneer 3 Theater in Nebraska City as well as Henry Doorly Zoo and Horsemen’s Park (Renamed Statesman’s in the film) in Omaha. At its peak the production employed as many as 65 cast and crew members with extras hired from the area.

== Release ==
Paramount Pictures holds the distribution rights for Snack Shack under the Republic Pictures banner. The film was released in the United States on March 15, 2024. The distributor acquired the rights prior to the film's release being delayed by the 2023 Hollywood labor disputes.

== Reception ==
On the review aggregator website Rotten Tomatoes, 82% of 35 critics' reviews are positive, with an average rating of 6.2/10. The website's consensus reads: "Deftly directed by Adam Rehmeier, Snack Shack is a period-set coming-of-age comedy that's witty and charming enough to largely transcend its lack of originality." Metacritic, which uses a weighted average, assigned the film a score of 64 out of 100, based on 6 critics, indicating "generally favorable" reviews.

Calum Marsh of The New York Times praised the film, writing that "with its rambling momentum and quick-witted, almost musical dialogue, it feels less like Superbad than a Robert Altman movie, sort of like a pint-size California Split." Jesse Hassenger of Paste was also positive about the film, writing "This sentimentalization plagues so many nostalgia pieces aimed at ex-kids, though at least a movie that ultimately pushes its luck and stalls out befits the high-rolling teenagers at its center. Most of Snack Shack is a winning scheme." Robert Kojder of Flickering Myth called it "a lively and fittingly crass coming-of-age story with a great deal of feeling, truthfulness, and period specificity." J. Kim Murphy of Variety wrote, "Armed with a talented cast, writer-director Adam Rehmeier's 1991-set feature happily squares itself in a tradition of teenage hedonism and broad learning opportunities, settling into a generic but warm glow."

The performances received acclaim. Murphy wrote, "Abdalla and Sherry do strike a winning chemistry, and the actress offers some subtle indicators that Brooke's ironic detachment masks a more private sadness". Of LaBelle, Marsh wrote, "As he delivers the most artful swearing since Peter Capaldi in In the Loop, it’s hard to believe that this is the same LaBelle who was recently so wide-eyed and tender as Sammy Fabelman."

Matt Schimkowitz of The A.V. Club gave a mixed review where he praised Rehmeier's directing, commenting "Whether in an impressive one-shot through a teen booze party or A.J. and Moose flipping burgers and fries in their mouths in the back of a speeding pick-up, Rehmeier constructs an intoxicating teenage dreamworld." Kayla Turner of Screen Rant criticized the screenplay, saying that "The movie starts off quickly and provides an in-your-face introduction to the film's intended direction. However, the momentum quickly fizzles out, and the plot begins to meander towards the finish line, taking several unnecessary detours along the way." Multiple reviewers critiqued the abrupt tonal shift in the film's third act as unnecessarily manipulative and unearned. Roger Moore of Movie Nation criticized the film for being "very long" and "not that funny," and felt that it was a "comedy connected by disjointed and generally unoriginal scenes rather than a coherent narrative."
