= Happy Gilmore 2 =

2025 film by Kyle Newacheck

- Release poster
- Directed by: Kyle Newacheck
- Written by: Tim Herlihy; Adam Sandler
- Based on: Characters by Tim Herlihy; Adam Sandler
- Produced by: Adam Sandler; Tim Herlihy; Jack Giarraputo; Robert Simonds
- Starring: Adam Sandler; Julie Bowen; Christopher McDonald; Benny Safdie; Bad Bunny; Ben Stiller
- Cinematography: Zak Mulligan
- Edited by: Brian Robinson; Tom Costain; J. J. Titone
- Music by: Rupert Gregson-Williams
- Production company: Happy Madison Productions
- Distributed by: Netflix
- Release date: July 25, 2025
- Running time: 118 minutes
- Country: United States
- Language: English
- Budget: $152.5 million

Happy Gilmore 2 is a 2025 American sports comedy film directed by Kyle Newacheck. Serving as a sequel to Happy Gilmore (1996), Happy Gilmore 2 was written and produced by Adam Sandler and Tim Herlihy, and stars Sandler, Julie Bowen, Christopher McDonald, and Ben Stiller who reprised their roles from the original film, while Benny Safdie and Bad Bunny star in new roles.

The film follows Happy Gilmore returning to professional golf to help pay for his daughter's overseas ballet school following his wife's death, which led him to relapse into alcoholism. Filming took place in New Jersey from September to December 2024. Happy Gilmore 2 was released onto Netflix on July 25, 2025, and received mixed reviews.

== Plot ==
After winning his first Tour Championship in 1996, (Note: As depicted in Happy Gilmore (1996).) Happy Gilmore has a successful golf career, winning five more championships. He also has five children with his wife, Virginia, who is also the professional golf tour's public relations director. After accidentally killing Virginia in 2014 when one of his drives hits her in the head, Happy feels devastated and quits golf out of guilt. He soon becomes an alcoholic and loses everything after a repossession worker sues him for instigating a brawl when mistaking the worker for a car thief.

Eleven years later, Happy works at a supermarket and lives with his only daughter and youngest child Vienna, while his four sons—Gordie, Wayne, Bobby, and Terry—have all moved out and are working to support their father and sister. Vienna wants to pursue dancing, and her dance teacher recommends enrolling in a four-year ballet school in Paris, which costs $75,000 annually. Frank Manatee, CEO of Maxi Energy Drink and the upcoming golf league Maxi Golf, later approaches Happy and wants him to be the league's star. Happy refuses but resumes playing golf with encouragement from John Daly, wanting to win enough money to put Vienna through ballet school.

During his first round since Virginia's death, Happy drinks heavily and crashes his golf cart, which gets him fired from his job and in legal trouble. A jury agrees to remove all charges if he completes an alcohol treatment program and refrains from any physical altercations. This treatment program's leader turns out to be Hal L., the caretaker who forced Happy's grandmother into sweat shop labor.

Vienna and John advise Happy to practice seriously and to join the next Tour Championship, which he does. One month later, Happy meets old companions, including Doug Thompson, president of the Tour, who worries about Maxi Golf rising fast. After Happy suggests having a competition between the two leagues, Doug proposes a match with the five best players from each league competing against each other. Happy, with help from his new caddie, Oscar Mejías, plays well at the Tour Championship in the first three rounds, but collapses in the fourth round on Mother's Day, seeing visions of Virginia on the course before getting drunk, finishing sixth. The winner, Billy Jenkins, admits to being in Maxi Golf, having participated in the Tour Championship as a taunt, vacating his place on the team and enabling Happy to join.

Having been in psychiatric care since losing to Happy at the 1996 Tour Championship, Shooter McGavin is granted a release by Frank. He explains to Shooter that all players on Maxi Golf, including Billy, have their iliolumbar ligament severed, increasing their driving distance, and asks him to join as their captain. Disgusted with this and how Frank's "extreme" version of golf highly strays from the traditional game, Shooter turns him down and escapes. Having heard about Virginia's death, Shooter visits her grave and briefly fights Happy there before they call a truce. Happy later meets Slim Peterson, whose father Chubbs Peterson had mentored Happy in 1996, and Slim joins Shooter in coaching Happy, Rory McIlroy, Bryson DeChambeau, Brooks Koepka, and Scottie Scheffler to face Maxi Golf.

During the match, Scottie gets disqualified in the first round for punching his opponent. Although the course is heavily designed to advantage Maxi Golf, as all their golfers are long drivers, the traditional golfers manage to make it 2–2, with the help of Shooter, who replaces Brooks after he gets injured. Happy and Billy then face off in a tie-breaker. Happy has a chance to putt for victory, but Frank alters the green to make it impossible to putt. He then makes a deal with Happy: if Happy misses the putt, he must join Maxi Golf. Otherwise, Frank must discontinue Maxi Golf, buy Happy's house back, pay for Vienna's ballet school, give Happy his new Rolls-Royce Spectre, and open a new Italian restaurant for Oscar. With help from the lattermost, Happy sinks the putt and wins.

When Happy celebrates his three-month sobriety, Hal is exposed as a con artist and gets arrested by the FBI. Maxi Energy Drink is discontinued after being revealed to cause significant oral health issues, leaving Frank in ruin and in hiding. Happy later accompanies his family at an airport as they fly off to Paris, promising to join them after completing the British Open, but is forced to walk, having forgotten to charge the electric Rolls-Royce, as he waves to visions of various people from his past.

== Cast ==
- Adam Sandler as Happy Gilmore, a golfer who comes out of retirement
- Julie Bowen as Virginia Venit Gilmore, Happy's deceased wife
- Christopher McDonald as Shooter McGavin, Happy's former rival who suffered a mental breakdown following his defeat at the Tour Championship at the end of the first film
- Benny Safdie as Frank Manatee, the CEO of Maxi Energy Drink and sponsor of Maxi Golf
- Bad Bunny as Oscar Mejías, Happy's caddy and a former busboy who dreams of owning a restaurant
- John Daly as a fictionalized version of himself, a hermit who lives in Happy's garage
- Ben Stiller as Haloysius "Hal L." Lieberman, the abusive leader of a support group for alcoholics. Stiller reprises his role as Hal L. from both the previous film and Hubie Halloween (2020).
- Jackie Sandler as Monica, Vienna's dance teacher
- Sadie Sandler as Charlotte, a FBI agent who went undercover as a member of Hal L.'s support group
- Sunny Sandler as Vienna Gilmore, Happy's youngest child and only daughter who aspires to be a dancer
  - Loulou Lazarus as 6-year-old Vienna
- Maxwell Jacob Friedman as Gordie Gilmore, Happy's eldest son
  - Roy Tusia as 6-year-old Gordie
  - Ellis Kraver as 10/12-year-old Gordie
  - Brigg Liberman as 16-year-old Gordie
- Ethan Cutkosky as Wayne Gilmore, Happy's second son
  - Sully Flannery as 6/8-year-old Wayne
  - Phoenix Raine Crepin as 10/12-year-old Wayne
- Philip Fine Schneider as Bobby Gilmore, Happy's third son
  - Leo Turk as 8/10-year-old Bobby
  - Max Gottfried as 14-year-old Bobby
- Conor Sherry as Terry Gilmore, Happy's youngest son
  - Rocco Gozzi as 6-year-old Terry
  - Mason Gozzi as 6/8-year-old Terry
  - Calhoun Metcalf as 10-year-old Terry
- Dennis Dugan as Doug Thompson, the commissioner of the professional golf tour
- Kevin Nealon as Gary Potter, an eccentric sports commentator and former professional golfer
- Haley Joel Osment as Billy Jenkins, a young pro-golfer with a powerful swing similar to Happy's who is part of the Maxi Golf team
- Lavell Crawford as Slim Peterson, son of Happy's late mentor Chubbs who also sports a prosthetic hand due to a vending machine incident
- Bryson DeChambeau, Brooks Koepka, Rory McIlroy, and Scottie Scheffler as fictionalized versions of themselves, members of the team representing the traditional Tour Championship at the Maxi competition
- Will Zalatoris as a fictionalized version of himself, depicted as Happy's previously-unnamed former caddy (played by Jared Van Snellenberg in the first film)
- Eminem as Donald Floyd Jr., son of the late heckler Donald Sr. (known as the "Jackass" guy and played by Joe Flaherty in the first film)
- Marcello Hernandez as Esteban, Oscar's cousin
- Travis Kelce as Oscar's abusive boss at the club restaurant
- Oliver Hudson as Harley, a Maxi Golf team member
- Fernando Marrero as Screech, a Maxi Golf team member
- Reggie Bush as Davis "8-Ball" Miller, a Maxi Golf team member
- Becky Lynch as Flex, a Maxi Golf team member
- Boban Marjanović as Drago Larson, the son of Happy's late boss Mr. Larson (played by Richard Kiel in the first film)
  - Joseph Vecsey as Little Drago
- Judy Sandler as Mrs. Larson
- Nick Swardson as Ben Daggett
- Blake Clark as a homeless man living on a beach

=== Cameos and returning characters ===
Steve Buscemi portrays the Gilmores' neighbor Pat, Kym Whitley plays support group member Bessie, and John Farley appears as Nate. Eric André, Martin Herlihy, and Margaret Qualley appear as Steiner, Fitzy, and Sally, a trio of young golfers whom Happy joins, while Austin Post (Post Malone) portrays DJ Omar Gosh. Scott Mescudi (Kid Cudi) plays an FBI agent. Women's National Basketball Association (WNBA) player Kelsey Plum and musician Andrew Watt play the golf course receptionists.

Verne Lundquist reprises his role as himself from the first film alongside Jack Giarraputo as Jack Beard. Robert Smigel reprises his role as the IRS agent from the first film, now working as a lawyer. Jon Lovitz plays a "dapper" man at a driving range and Rob Schneider appears as a dwarf riding a tricycle in Happy's imagination. Sportscaster Dan Patrick portrays Pat Daniels. Longtime Sandler collaborator Jonathan Loughran portrays the orderly who releases Shooter from the mental facility.

=== Professional golfer cameos ===
Professional golfers Keegan Bradley, Fred Couples, Nick Faldo, Tony Finau, Rickie Fowler, Jim Furyk, Sergio García, Charley Hull, Hunter Mahan, Collin Morikawa, Jack Nicklaus, Corey Pavin, Xander Schauffele, Jordan Spieth, Justin Thomas, Lee Trevino (who also appeared in the first film) and Bubba Watson make cameo appearances as themselves.

Nelly Korda and Nancy Lopez appear alongside co-writer Tim Herlihy as the doctors overseeing Shooter's release from the mental facility, and Paige Spiranac plays an employee of Dick's Sporting Goods.

=== Celebrity appearances ===
Famous non-golf personalities appearing as themselves.

- Stephen A. Smith, Chris Berman and Jim Gray: sportscasters
- Alix Earle, influencer
- Cam'ron, rapper
- Ken Jennings, Jeopardy! host
- Sean Evans, interviewer
- Andrew Santino and Bobby Lee, comedy podcasters
- Guy Fieri, chef

=== Via archival footage ===
Sandler paid tribute to his late Grown Ups and Grown Ups 2 co-star Cameron Boyce. In 2019, Boyce died at the age of 20 due to complications from epilepsy. During one scene, Boyce briefly appears on a television screen in a clip from the Disney Channel series Jessie (2011–2015), which Sandler also guest-starred on.

== Production ==
In September 2022, Adam Sandler stated that he hoped to eventually make a sequel to Happy Gilmore, saying he had been creating ideas for what a follow-up film would be, while stating the character would be involved in a senior golf tour. In February 2024, Carl Weathers, who played Chubbs Peterson in the first film, died at age 76. Despite his character's death in the first film, he was set to reprise his role appearing as a ghost in Happy's dreams while his son Slim (Lavell Crawford) would resent Happy for causing his father's death. Weathers' death forced a heavy rewrite with Chubbs instead being given tributes throughout the film and Slim having already forgiven Happy and reduced to a smaller supporting role. Other actors, who had died since the first film that are given tributes, include Frances Bay who played Grandma Anna Gilmore, Richard Kiel who played Mr. Larson, gameshow host Bob Barker who played himself and Joe Flaherty who played Donald the "Jackass" Guy, each of whom died in 2011, 2014, 2023 and 2024, respectively. An indirect tribute was given to Dustin Diamond (who died in 2021), due to the Maxi Golf character Screech being confused for Diamond's character of the same name from Saved by the Bell.

In March 2024, Christopher McDonald revealed that a sequel was in development, and that Sandler had shown him a draft of the script to read. During development, the LIV Golf league was founded by the Saudi Arabia Public Investment Fund to rival the PGA Tour, giving inspirations to the film's storyline of the rivalry between the Tour and Maxi Golf.

In May 2024, it was announced that Netflix greenlit the film, while the first film was distributed by Universal Pictures. Kyle Newacheck was hired to direct the film, with Tim Herlihy co-writing the screenplay with Sandler. In July, Nick Swardson announced he would star in the film. In August, Sandler revealed Benny Safdie would have a role in the film, with football player Travis Kelce set to make a cameo. In September, McDonald and Julie Bowen were confirmed to be reprising their roles, with Bad Bunny, Margaret Qualley, and Maxwell Jacob Friedman added to the cast. John Daly revealed his own involvement with the film.

Principal photography began on September 9, 2024, in New Jersey, coinciding with Sandler's 58th birthday. A casting call took place at a hotel in Morristown, New Jersey. Filming locations in New Jersey include a country club in Bedminster, a burger shop in Garfield, a golf center in Hackettstown, a nail salon in Maplewood, a beach in Middletown, a deli in Millburn, a French restaurant in Montclair, a cafe in Morristown, a public school in Newark, Seton Hall University in South Orange, Montclair Golf Club in West Orange, Verona Town Hall in Verona Township, a boys & girls club in Kearny, and a Stop & Shop supermarket in Clifton. Filming wrapped on December 10, 2024.

== Release ==
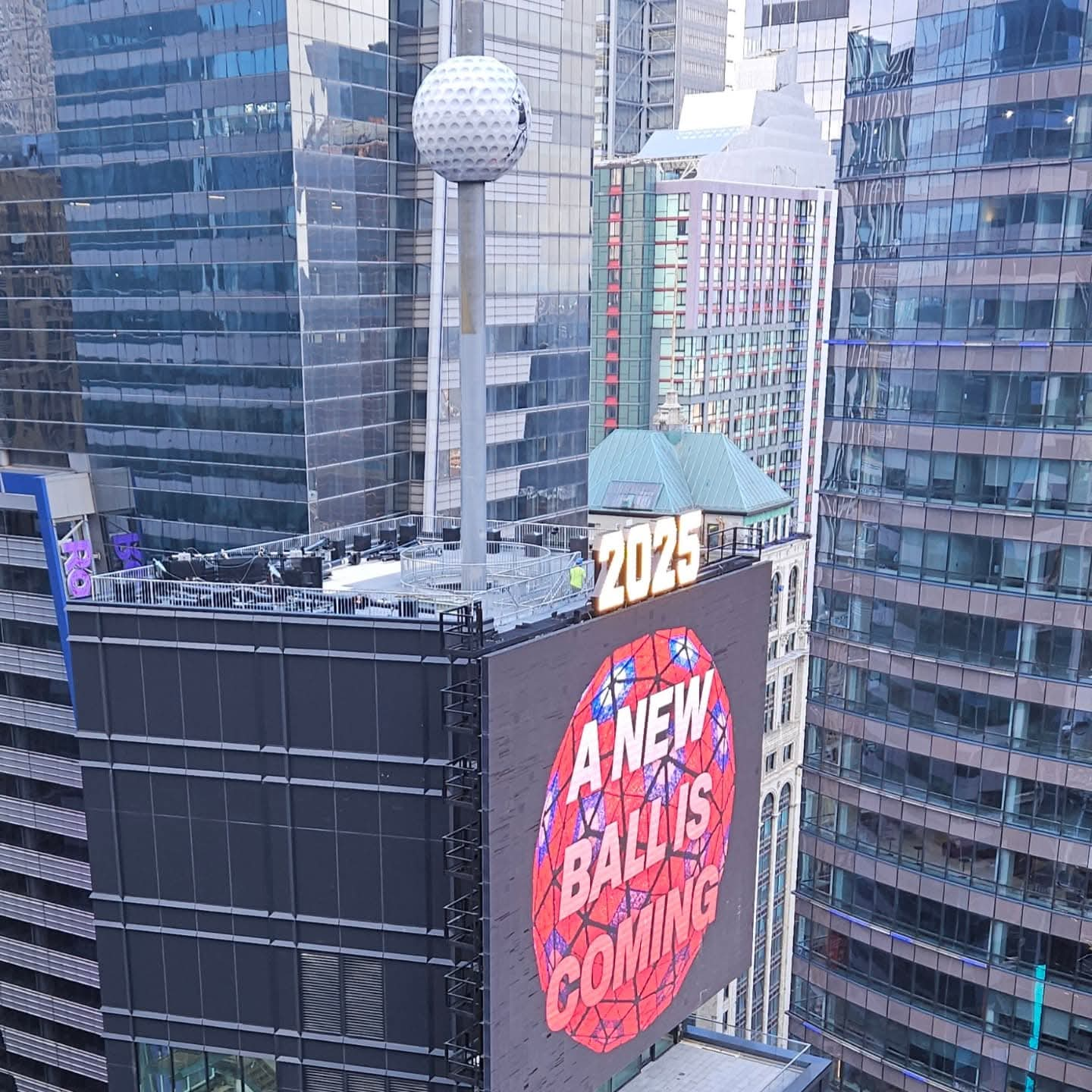
The Times Square Ball was replaced by a Happy Gilmore golf ball as part of a promotional campaign.

Happy Gilmore 2 premiered at the Lincoln Center in New York City on July 21, 2025. The film was released on Netflix on July 25, 2025. For the week of July 21–27, Happy Gilmore 2 ranked first on Netflix's list of English-language movies, drawing 46.7 million views in three days making it the biggest US Netflix film debut of the year, with 4.7 million views in the US over its initial weekend.

Topgolf Callaway participated in promotional campaigns for the film, including conducting screenings at Topgolf driving ranges, and releasing branded apparel and equipment (including Gilmore's Odyssey hockey stick putter, and Chrome Tour golf balls printed with iconography and quotes from the films). One promotional effort involved the replacement of the Times Square Ball at One Times Square in New York City with a Happy Gilmore golf ball.

== Reception ==
On the review aggregator website Rotten Tomatoes, 61% of 127 critics' reviews are positive, with an average rating of 5.5/10. The website's consensus reads: "With Adam Sandler and company clearly having a good time, Happy Gilmore 2 thwacks hard with nostalgia when it should've putted but will still put fans of the original back in their happy place." Metacritic, which uses a weighted average, assigned the film a score of 52 out of 100, based on 23 critics, indicating "mixed or average" reviews.

Richard Roeper of RogerEbert.com gave the film three out of four stars and wrote, "The scatological 'humor' is as low-brow as it gets; either you find it funny or you don't. I've never been a huge fan of that ... stuff, but the physical, Three Stooges material has a certain, admittedly dumb, slapstick appeal. Still, Happy Gilmore makes par through the strength of its sheer stupid energy and the game efforts of Sandler and his 50 or so co-stars. It's good to be back in that Happy Place."

Conversely, Frank Scheck of The Hollywood Reporter said, "Other than a running gag revolving around Happy's use of every possible object as a liquor container, the film's main humor involves people being painfully hit by golf balls. By the time the movie ends and you've been assaulted by one tired gag after another, you'll know exactly how they feel."

Liz Shannon Miller of Consequence gave the film a B− and commented "Between Happy's family life and a whole new series of challenges for him to tackle, there's enough freshness to the plot to keep it from feeling like a total rehash of what came before, while still delivering wild golf stunts and a huge range of cameos."
