= All Square =

2018 film directed by John Hyams

- Film poster
- Directed by: John Hyams
- Written by: Timothy Brady
- Produced by: Jordan Foley; Jonathan Rosenthal; Michael Kelly; Yeardley Smith; Ben Cornwell
- Starring: Michael Kelly; Jesse Ray Sheps; Pamela Adlon; Isiah Whitlock Jr.
- Cinematography: Yaron Levy
- Music by: Steve Dueck, Max Knouse, Michael Krasner, Robin Vining
- Production companies: Mill House Motion Pictures; Paper Clip
- Release dates: 10 March 2018 (South by Southwest Film Festival); 12 October 2018
- Running time: 93 minutes
- Country: United States
- Language: English

All Square is a 2018 American drama film directed by John Hyams. It stars Michael Kelly, Jesse Ray Sheps, Pamela Adlon. The film won the 2018 Best Narrative Film Award at the SXSW Film Festival.

== Plot ==
John "Zibs" Zbikowski is a down-on-his-luck, small-town bookie. He abandoned a promising baseball career in his youth to care for his ailing father Bob, whose life fell apart after a fatal DUI. Zibs inherited Bob's sportsbook, but has difficulty collecting on debts from the locals, often stealing from their houses as collateral. After a one-night stand with his high school ex-girlfriend Debbie, Zibs ends up babysitting her 12-year old son Brian the next day. Zibs reluctantly accepts Brian's invitation to his baseball game, and is inspired to start taking bets on the local Youth League.

The scheme is immediately lucrative for Zibs, though it results in bad behavior from the coaches and parents at games. Zibs starts spending more time with Brian as well, teaching him to pitch. He also introduces Brian to drinking, gambling, and fighting, and has him act as a lookout during home robberies. Debbie becomes wary of Zibs's influence on her son. With the success of the Youth League sports book, Zibs all but abandons his day job as a sheet rock installer, alienating his friend and colleague Scotty. Meanwhile, Matt "Smitty" Smith, the Little League commissioner who is running for public office, catches onto Zibs' new sports book scheme and tries to blackmail him into shutting it down. Zibs learns from Brian that Smitty is cheating on his wife with Debbie, and leverages this information to keep Smitty quiet.

Brian becomes disillusioned with Zibs's scheme after seeing the increasingly hostile behavior of the Youth League parents. He deliberately throws a huge game, nearly causing a riot to break out on the baseball field. Smitty cancels the rest of the season and Zibs's clients turn on him. After Zibs and Brian have a falling out, Brian breaks into his estranged father Hooper's house, and Hooper puts him in the hospital. Zibs seeks revenge on Hooper, but Bob talks him out of taking action, revealing that his "DUI" was actually the deliberate murder of a man sleeping with his wife. Zibs reconciles with Brian and abandons the Youth League sports book, but admits his behavior is unlikely to change otherwise.

== Cast ==
- Michael Kelly as John Zbikowski
- Jesse Ray Sheps as Brian
- Pamela Adlon as Debbie
- Isiah Whitlock Jr. as Scotty
- Tom Everett Scott as Adam
- Yeardley Smith as Beaches
- Harris Yulin as Bob
- Josh Lucas as Matt Smith
- Five Novogratz

== Production ==
The movie was initially written to be set in Wilmington, Delaware. At Kelly's request, the setting was moved to Dundalk, Maryland so crew members from House of Cards could work on the film.

== Release ==
The film was released on 12 October 2018 in the United States.
