= Carolina Caroline =

2025 film by Adam Carter Rehmeier

- Theatrical release poster
- Directed by: Adam Carter Rehmeier
- Written by: William Thomas Dean IV
- Produced by: Tim White; Trevor White; Stephen Braun; Eric B. Fleischman; Chris Abernathy; Chris Ward
- Starring: Samara Weaving; Kyle Gallner; Jon Gries; Kyra Sedgwick
- Cinematography: Jean-Philippe Bernier
- Edited by: Justin Krohn
- Music by: Chris Bear
- Production companies: Bee-Hive Productions; Star Thrower Entertainment; Create & Complete Entertainment; The Wonder Company; Macpac Entertainment; FilmNation Entertainment
- Distributed by: Magnolia Pictures
- Release dates: September 5, 2025 (TIFF); June 5, 2026 (United States)
- Running time: 106 minutes
- Country: United States
- Language: English
- Box office: $382,631

Carolina Caroline is a 2025 American crime thriller film directed by Adam Carter Rehmeier and written by William Thomas Dean IV. It stars Samara Weaving, Kyle Gallner, Jon Gries, and Kyra Sedgwick.

The film had its world premiere in the Centrepiece program of the Toronto International Film Festival on September 5, 2025. It was released in the United States on June 5, 2026, by Magnolia Pictures. The film received positive reviews from critics.

== Plot ==
Caroline Daniels is a gas station attendant in rural Texas. Caroline's father Hank has raised her since her mother Deborah abandoned Caroline as an infant. She meets Oliver Anderson, a con artist who runs a short change scam on her employer. They fall in love, and Caroline agrees to travel with Oliver with the goal of reaching South Carolina, where her mother lives. The two engage in scams throughout the South, including small bank robberies. After a robbery, Oliver threatens a hotel employee with a gun, which creates tension with Caroline. She insists on going directly to South Carolina.

They find Deborah, an alcoholic who rejects Caroline. Distraught, Caroline demands that they escalate to larger bank robberies so that they can afford to leave the country. After a robbery goes wrong they are forced to flee in a stolen car, abandoning the money they had stolen. While they flee, they are pulled over by a police officer. Oliver shoots and kills the officer, which distresses Caroline. The two reconcile in a roadhouse, but police find them and surround the establishment. Oliver fires a gun into the air to create a distraction, allowing Caroline to escape as the police storm the building in reaction to the shots. He then fires in the general direction of the police, committing suicide by cop. Caroline manages to reclaim the lost money, throw the police off her trail, and buy a plane ticket to Ecuador, but not before pulling one last short change scam on the airport ticket agent.

== Cast ==
- Samara Weaving as Caroline Daniels
- Kyle Gallner as Oliver Anderson
- Jon Gries as Hank Daniels
- Kyra Sedgwick as Deborah

== Production ==
In September 2024, it was reported that a romantic crime thriller film directed by Adam Carter Rehmeier and written by Tom Dean titled Carolina Caroline had begun principal photography in Kentucky. Samara Weaving, Kyle Gallner, Kyra Sedgwick, and Jon Gries rounded out the main cast.

== Release ==
The film had its world premiere in the Centrepiece program of the Toronto International Film Festival on September 5, 2025. In October 2025, Magnolia Pictures acquired North American distribution rights to the film, and released in the United States on June 5, 2026.

== Reception ==
On the review aggregator website Rotten Tomatoes, 93% of 72 critics' reviews are positive, with an average rating of 7.4/10. The website's consensus reads: "Traversing a classic crime formula with an atmosphere that's as sweltering as Samara Weaving and Kyle Gallner's chemistry, Carolina Caroline injects its doomed love story with an invigorating shot of adrenaline." Metacritic, which uses a weighted average, assigned the film a score of 75 out of 100, based on 15 critics, indicating "generally favorable" reviews.

Jami Philbrick of Moviefone praised the film as a 'beautifully made and romantic Southern Gothic adventure", also comparing it to other romantic crime films such as True Romance, Badlands, and Bonnie and Clyde.
