= Fire Country =

American action drama television series

- Genre: Action drama; Procedural drama
- Created by: Max Thieriot; Tony Phelan; Joan Rater
- Starring: Max Thieriot; Kevin Alejandro; Jordan Calloway; Stephanie Arcila; Jules Latimer; Diane Farr; Billy Burke; Olivia Thirlby
- Theme music composer: Fil Eisler
- Country of origin: United States
- Original language: English
- No. of seasons: 5
- No. of episodes: 78

Production
- Executive producers: Max Thieriot; Tony Phelan; Joan Rater; Jerry Bruckheimer; Jonathan Littman; KristieAnne Reed
- Producers: Val Stefoff; Barbara Friend
- Production locations: Fort Langley, Vancouver
- Editors: Amy McGrath; Meridith Sommers; Roderick Davis
- Running time: 44 minutes
- Production companies: Jerry Bruckheimer Television; CBS Studios; Midwest Livestock; Daily Dramatic Productions

Original release
- Network: CBS
- Release: October 7, 2022 – present

Related
- Sheriff Country

Fire Country is an American action drama television series created by Max Thieriot, Tony Phelan and Joan Rater for CBS, starring Thieriot. It is produced by Jerry Bruckheimer Television and CBS Studios. The series premiered on October 7, 2022. The fifth season premiered on October 9, 2026.

== Premise ==
Bode Leone is a young convict with a troubled past. Hoping to redeem himself and shorten his prison sentence, he volunteers for the California Conservation Camp Program in which prisoners assist the California Department of Forestry and Fire Protection, known as Cal Fire. He ends up getting assigned to his hometown in Northern California, the fictional town of Edgewater, and the nearby Cal Fire station called Three Rock, where he works alongside former friends, other inmates, and veteran firefighters tasked with putting out the wildfires that plague the region.

== Cast and characters ==
=== Main ===
- Max Thieriot as Bode Donovan-Leone, a former inmate firefighter, now a Cal Fire firefighter.
- Kevin Alejandro as Manuel "Manny" Perez, Gabriela's father and a Cal Fire firefighter, now Station 42 Battalion Chief. He is the former Captain of Three Rock.
- Jordan Calloway as Jake Crawford, a Cal Fire firefighter, now Station 42 Captain.
- Stephanie Arcila as Gabriela Perez (seasons 1–3; guest season 4), Manny's daughter, a Cal Fire firefighter and paramedic. In the season 4 premiere, she leaves Edgewater after accepting a job offer from Cal Fire, recruiting new firefighters nationwide.
- Jules Latimer as Eve Edwards, Bode and Jake's best friend, and a Cal Fire firefighter, now Captain of Three Rock.
- Diane Farr as Sharon Leone, Bode and Riley's mother, Vince's wife, and a Cal Fire Division Chief.
- Billy Burke as Vincent "Vince" Leone (seasons 1–3), Bode and Riley's father, Sharon's husband, and Cal Fire Battalion Chief. In the season 4 premiere, he was revealed to have perished during the season 3 finale in a building collapse.
- Olivia Thirlby as Cecilia Jade “CJ” Ryan (season 5), a firefighter originally from Philadelphia.

=== Recurring ===
- W. Tré Davis as Freddy "Goat" Mills (season 1; guest season 2), a former inmate firefighter and Bode's friend.
- Michael Trucco as Luke Leone, Vince's brother and Cal Fire Battalion, Division, and later Assistant Unit Chief.
- Jade Pettyjohn as Riley Leone (season 1), Vince and Sharon's deceased daughter, Bode's younger sister, and Eve's best friend.
- Fiona Rene as Rebecca Lee (season 1), female inmate and former attorney.
- Sabina Gadecki as Cara Maisonette (seasons 1–2), Bode's ex-girlfriend and an aspiring ER nurse.
- Zach Tinker as Collin O'Reilly / Alex Shawcross (season 1), a probationary firefighter.
- Katrina Reynolds as Cookie (season 1), Freddy's girlfriend.
- Karen LeBlanc as Lilly Crawford (season 1), Jake's mother, and a cardiothoracic surgeon in Los Angeles.
- Jeff Fahey as Walter Leone, Vince and Luke's father, and Bode's grandfather, a retired Cal Fire Battalion Chief.
- Barclay Hope as Father David Pascal
- Rebecca Mader as Faye Stone (season 1), the CEO and founder of Nozzle, a private concierge firefighting company.
- Kanoa Goo as Kyle Ferguson (season 1), a diving friend of Gabriela's.
- Crystal Balint as Erika Snow (season 1), a Cal Fire Assistant Chief.
- Riley Davis as Troy Elliott (season 1), a young inmate firefighter.
- Rafael de la Fuente as Diego Moreno (seasons 2–3), a Cal Fire paramedic and Gabriela’s new fiancée
- Tye White as Cole Rodman (season 2–3), a former MMA fighter who is Bode's cellmate.
- Jason O'Mara as Liam (season 2), a handsome firefighter who is a former colleague of Sharon's.
- Alix West Lefler as Genevieve Maisonette (season 2–3), Cara's daughter, whose paternal lineage is unknown
- Paola Núñez as Roberta (season 2–present), Gabriela's mother and Manny's ex-wife.
- Catherine Lough Haggquist as Governor Kelly (season 2)
- Leven Rambin as Audrey James (season 3–4), an ex-con and current Cal Fire firefighter.
- Jared Padalecki as Camden Casey (season 3), a SoCal firefighter captain.
- Katie Findlay as Francine (season 3–4), Eve's girlfriend.
- Phil Morris as Elroy Edwards (season 3–present), Eve's father and a ranch owner.
- Constance Zimmer as Renée (season 3–4), a lawyer, and Vince's high school sweetheart.
- Nesta Cooper as Violet (season 3–present), a recently divorced lawyer that becomes Jake's girlfriend and eventual wife.
- Blake Lee as Finn (season 3), a photographer who becomes obsessed with Gabriela.
- Shawn Hatosy as Brett Richards (season 4), interim Battalion Chief at Station 42 following Vince’s death.
- Christine Lahti as Ruby Quinn (season 4), Sharon’s mother and Bode’s grandmother.
- Conor Sherry as Tyler Mackenzie (season 4), a teen Bode begins mentoring and the son of his old friend Chloe.
- Josh McDermitt as Landon (season 4), Chloe’s ex and a father figure to her son Tyler.
- Alona Tal as Chloe Mackenzie (season 4), a teacher, and an old friend of Bode’s whose son he begins mentoring.
- Dominic Goodman as Malcolm Crawford (season 4), Jake's half-brother and a Drake County firefighter.
- Natalie Zea as Camille Thurston (seasons 4-5), a doctor who Manny meets at the Edgewater Rodeo.

=== Guest ===
- April Amber Telek as Dolly Burnett (season 1), Bode's honorary aunt.
- Aaron Pearl as Paulie Burnett (season 1), Bode's honorary uncle.
- Kane Brown as Robin (season 1), a train hopper who helps Cal Fire with victims of a train crash.
- Michael O'Neill as Harlen Denbo (season 1)
- Jelly Roll as Noah (season 3), a former convict, now healthcare worker turning his life around.

=== Crossover characters from Sheriff Country ===
- Morena Baccarin as Mickey Fox (season 2–present), Sheriff of Edgewater, and Sharon's former stepsister.
- W. Earl Brown as Wes Fox (season 3–present), Mickey's father and an off-the-grid marijuana grower. He is Sharon’s former stepfather.
- Matt Lauria as Nathan Boone (season 4–present), a deputy who is second-in-command of Edgewater.
- Ian Quinlan as Hank Iglesias (season 5), one of Edgewater's deputies.
- Michele Weaver as Cassidy Campbell (season 5), one of Edgewater's deputies.
- Amanda Arcuri as Skye Fraley (season 5), Mickey's daughter and Sharon’s former step niece/Bode’s former step cousin

== Episodes ==
=== Series overview ===
| Season | Episodes | Originally released | |
| Season | Episodes | First released | Last released |
|---|---|---|---|
| 1 | 22 | October 7, 2022 | May 19, 2023 |
| 2 | 10 | February 16, 2024 | May 17, 2024 |
| 3 | 20 | October 18, 2024 | April 25, 2025 |
| 4 | 20 | October 17, 2025 | May 22, 2026 |
| 5 | 13 | October 9, 2026 | February 5, 2027 |

=== Season 1 (2022–23) ===
| No. overall | No. in season | Title | Directed by | Written by | Original release date | U.S. viewers (millions) |
|---|---|---|---|---|---|---|
| 1 | 1 | "Pilot" | James Strong | Teleplay by : Joan Rater & Tony Phelan; Story by : Joan Rater & Tony Phelan & Max Thieriot | October 7, 2022 | 5.91 |
| 2 | 2 | "The Fresh Prince of Edgewater" | Dermott Downs | Natalia Fernàndez | October 14, 2022 | 5.80 |
| 3 | 3 | "Where There's Smoke..." | Eagle Egilsson | David Gould | October 21, 2022 | 5.26 |
| 4 | 4 | "Work, Don't Worry" | Jacquie Gould | Tonya Kong | October 28, 2022 | 5.30 |
| 5 | 5 | "Get Some, Be Safe" | Gonzalo Amat | Barbara Kaye Friend | November 4, 2022 | 5.53 |
| 6 | 6 | "Like Old Times" | Erica Watson | Sara Casey & Manuel Herrera | November 18, 2022 | 5.47 |
| 7 | 7 | "Happy to Help" | Antonio Negret | Dwain Worrell | December 2, 2022 | 5.46 |
| 8 | 8 | "Bad Guy" | Kevin Alejandro | Tia Napolitano | December 9, 2022 | 5.59 |
| 9 | 9 | "No Good Deed" | Sarah Wayne Callies | Tia Napolitano & Julia Fontana | January 6, 2023 | 6.57 |
| 10 | 10 | "Get Your Hopes Up" | Laura Nisbet Peters | Natalia Fernàndez | January 13, 2023 | 5.95 |
| 11 | 11 | "Mama Bear" | Anton L. Cropper | David Gould | January 20, 2023 | 6.10 |
| 12 | 12 | "Two Pink Lines" | Dermott Downs | Joan Rater & Tony Phelan | January 29, 2023 | 10.08 |
Note: This episode aired after CBS's broadcast of the AFC Championship Game.
| 13 | 13 | "You Know Your Dragon Best" | Marie Jamora | Tia Napolitano & Barbara Kaye Friend | February 3, 2023 | 6.37 |
| 14 | 14 | "A Fair to Remember" | Kantú Lentz | Sara Casey & Manuel Herrera | February 10, 2023 | 6.49 |
| 15 | 15 | "False Promises" | C. Chi-Yoon Chung | Natalia Fernàndez | March 3, 2023 | 6.00 |
| 16 | 16 | "My Kinda Leader" | Eagle Egilsson | Dwain Worrell | March 10, 2023 | 5.59 |
| 17 | 17 | "A Cry for Help" | Gonzalo Amat | Julia Fontana | March 31, 2023 | 5.27 |
| 18 | 18 | "Off the Rails" | Bill Purple | Tia Napolitano & David Gould | April 7, 2023 | 6.09 |
| 19 | 19 | "Watch Your Step" | Lisa Demaine | Joelle Garfinkel | April 21, 2023 | 5.82 |
| 20 | 20 | "At the End of My Rope" | Joy Lane | Julia Fontana & Barbara Kaye Friend | May 5, 2023 | 5.32 |
| 21 | 21 | "Backfire" | Max Thieriot | David Gould | May 12, 2023 | 5.06 |
| 22 | 22 | "I Know It Feels Impossible" | Dermott Downs | Tia Napolitano | May 19, 2023 | 5.32 |

=== Season 2 (2024) ===
| No. overall | No. in season | Title | Directed by | Written by | Original release date | U.S. viewers (millions) |
|---|---|---|---|---|---|---|
| 23 | 1 | "Something's Coming" | Bill Purple | Tia Napolitano | February 16, 2024 | 5.71 |
| 24 | 2 | "Like Breathing Again" | Kevin Alejandro | Natalia Fernàndez | February 23, 2024 | 5.23 |
| 25 | 3 | "See You Next Apocalypse" | Kantú Lentz | Dwain Worrell | March 1, 2024 | 5.25 |
| 26 | 4 | "Too Many Unknowns" | Nicole Rubio | Barbara Kaye Friend | March 15, 2024 | 5.06 |
| 27 | 5 | "This Storm Will Pass" | Eagle Egilsson | David Gould | April 5, 2024 | 4.95 |
| 28 | 6 | "Alert the Sheriff" | Max Thieriot | Teleplay by : Joan Rater & Tony Phelan; Story by : Joan Rater & Tony Phelan & Max Thieriot | April 12, 2024 | 5.05 |
| 29 | 7 | "A Hail Mary" | Marie Jamora | Sara Casey & Manuel Herrera | April 26, 2024 | 5.06 |
| 30 | 8 | "It's Not Over" | Gonzalo Amat | India Gurley | May 3, 2024 | 5.00 |
| 31 | 9 | "No Future, No Consequences" | Sarah Wayne Callies | Anupam Nigam | May 10, 2024 | 4.67 |
| 32 | 10 | "I Do" | Bill Purple | Tia Napolitano & William Harper | May 17, 2024 | 5.22 |

=== Season 3 (2024–25) ===
| No. overall | No. in season | Title | Directed by | Written by | Original release date | U.S. viewers (millions) |
|---|---|---|---|---|---|---|
| 33 | 1 | "What the Bride Said" | Bill Purple | Tia Napolitano | October 18, 2024 | 4.55 |
| 34 | 2 | "Firing Squad" | Gonzalo Amat | Anupam Nigam | October 25, 2024 | 4.33 |
| 35 | 3 | "Welcome to the Cult" | Diane Farr | Tia Napolitano & Barbara Kaye Friend | November 1, 2024 | 4.60 |
| 36 | 4 | "Keep Your Cool" | Nicole Rubio | India Gurley | November 8, 2024 | 4.46 |
| 37 | 5 | "Edgewater's About to Get Real Cozy" | Mark Tonderai | Jen Klein | November 15, 2024 | 4.26 |
| 38 | 6 | "Not Without My Birds" | Alexis Ostrander | Teleplay by : Barbara Kaye Friend; Story by : Joe Hortua | November 22, 2024 | 4.74 |
| 39 | 7 | "False Alarm" | Sarah Wayne Callies | Jacqueline Furnare Donabedian | December 6, 2024 | 4.51 |
| 40 | 8 | "Promise Me" | Eagle Egilsson | Joe Hortua | December 13, 2024 | 4.54 |
| 41 | 9 | "Coming in Hot" | Kevin Alejandro | Tia Napolitano | January 31, 2025 | 3.80 |
| 42 | 10 | "The Leone Way" | Rubin Garcia | Sara Casey & Manuel Herrera | February 7, 2025 | 4.34 |
| 43 | 11 | "Fare Thee Well" | Desdemona Chiang | Anupam Nigam | February 14, 2025 | 4.10 |
| 44 | 12 | "I'm the One Who Just Goes Away" | Bill Purple | Jen Klein | February 21, 2025 | 4.47 |
| 45 | 13 | "My Team" | Kate Phelan | Barbara Kaye Friend | February 28, 2025 | 4.29 |
| 46 | 14 | "Death Trap" | Leslie Alejandro | Carrie Williams | March 7, 2025 | 4.12 |
| 47 | 15 | "One Last Time" | Jason Hellmann | Joe Hortua | March 14, 2025 | 4.24 |
| 48 | 16 | "Dirty Money" | James Strong | Joan Rater & Tony Phelan | April 4, 2025 | 4.00 |
| 49 | 17 | "Fire and Ice" | Gabriel Correa | Sara Casey & Manuel Herrera | April 11, 2025 | 4.21 |
| 50 | 18 | "Eyes and Ears Everywhere" | Freddie Highmore | Nick Spates | April 18, 2025 | 4.30 |
| 51 | 19 | "A Change in the Wind" | Max Thieriot | Jen Klein | April 25, 2025 | 3.97 |
| 52 | 20 | "I'd Do It Again" | Bill Purple | Tia Napolitano | April 25, 2025 | 3.97 |

=== Season 4 (2025–26) ===
| No. overall | No. in season | Title | Directed by | Written by | Original release date | U.S. viewers (millions) |
|---|---|---|---|---|---|---|
| 53 | 1 | "Goodbye for Now" | James Strong | Tia Napolitano | October 17, 2025 | 4.11 |
| 54 | 2 | "Not a Stray" | Bill Purple | Anupam Nigam | October 24, 2025 | 3.88 |
| 55 | 3 | "The Tiny Ways We Start to Heal" | Sarah Wayne Callies | Jen Klein & Carrie Williams | October 31, 2025 | 3.52 |
| 56 | 4 | "Like a Wounded Wildebeest" | Jordan Calloway | Joe Hortua | November 7, 2025 | 3.86 |
| 57 | 5 | "Happy First Day, Manny" | J. Michael Muro | Sara Casey & Manuel Herrera | November 14, 2025 | 3.86 |
| 58 | 6 | "Your Voice in My Head" | Catherine Mallette | India Gurley | November 21, 2025 | 3.70 |
| 59 | 7 | "Best Mom in the World" | Alexis Ostrander | Jen Klein | December 5, 2025 | N/A |
| 60 | 8 | "Fresh Start" | Oscar Rene Lozoya | Jacqueline Furnare Donabedian & Anupam Nigam | December 12, 2025 | N/A |
| 61 | 9 | "Who Owns the Dirt" | Eagle Egilsson | Tia Napolitano & Barbara Kaye Friend | December 19, 2025 | N/A |
| 62 | 10 | "On the Carpet" | Bill Purple | Joe Hortua | February 27, 2026 | N/A |
| 63 | 11 | "Elite of the Elite" | Leslie Alejandro | Sara Casey & Manuel Herrera | March 6, 2026 | N/A |
| 64 | 12 | "Life of a Firefighter" | Kate Phelan | Matt Bosack | March 13, 2026 | N/A |
| 65 | 13 | "The Bravest" | Bill Purple | Teleplay by : Barbara Kaye Friend; Story by : Barbara Kaye Friend & David Gould | April 3, 2026 | N/A |
Bode and Boone become trapped in the container underground with the kidnapped kids. Wes narrowly saves Sharon from an IED, but Jake is forced to set several off to clear a path. Margot, Violet's sister, goes into anaphylaxis from mold and stops breathing, forcing Boone to overcome his claustrophobia and dig out to 42 and Three Rock as they dig down simultaneously. The kids are successfully rescued, and Jake is able to revive Margot. With the help of Ruby Quinn and Gina and a clue from the kids, Mickey and Sharon identify the culprits as the quarry guards, the bus driver and their terminally ill friend, all of whom lost their homes to Cal Fire and the sheriff's department as kids to make way for building the quarry. Mickey and Sharon mend their quarrel over Ruby while Boone tears up a speeding ticket he had given Bode. This is the conclusion of a two-part crossover that began on Sheriff Country.
| 66 | 14 | "Why Not Now?" | Jason Hellmann | India Gurley | April 10, 2026 | N/A |
| 67 | 15 | "Making Things Go Boom" | Jules Latimer | Jen Klein | April 17, 2026 | N/A |
| 68 | 16 | "Not Worth the Risk" | Gabriel Correa | Miriam Sachs | April 24, 2026 | N/A |
| 69 | 17 | "Sometimes the Chaos Wins" | Nicole Rubio | Obiageli Odimegwu & Carrie Williams | May 1, 2026 | N/A |
| 70 | 18 | "Best Man" | Diane Farr | Sara Casey & Manuel Herrera | May 8, 2026 | N/A |
| 71 | 19 | "Rain Check for Tomorrow" | Ruben Garcia | Barbara Kaye Friend | May 15, 2026 | N/A |
| 72 | 20 | "Try Not to Drown" | Gonzalo Amat | Joe Hortua | May 22, 2026 | N/A |
As the Pineville Dam disaster turns into a flood of biblical proportions, Sharon and Richards coordinate rescue efforts while Bode, Jake and Danny are trapped in Danny's rapidly flooding cabin, and Manny tries to protect the hospital where Roberta is undergoing surgery with only Eve and Three Rock for backup. With the situation rapidly worsening, Jake takes Danny's kayak to a nearby boat ramp, bringing back Sharon and Richards to rescue Bode and Danny. Danny decides not to prosecute Bode and reconnect with his family. At a critical part in Roberta's surgery, Three Rock makes a heroic effort to move the hospital's generator to higher ground with Hartman stepping up as a leader. Roberta's surgery is a success and in the aftermath, Jake and Violet get married, Bode admits his love for Chloe and Sharon goes on a trip with Alexei. Bode and Sharon give Vince and Sharon's wedding rings to Jake and Violet to replace their lost rings.

=== Season 5 (2026) ===
| No. overall | No. in season | Title | Directed by | Written by | Original release date | U.S. viewers (millions) |
|---|---|---|---|---|---|---|
| 73 | 1 | "Founders' Day" | Ruben Garcia | Eric Guggenheim | October 9, 2026 | 4.29 |
A few weeks after the flood, Sharon has gone on a road trip while Violet discovers that she might be pregnant. Station 42 is struggling to keep up due to budget cuts and the closure of nearby fire houses in the wake of the flood, forcing 42 to cover more territory. Three Rock gets a new inmate, Angel Perez, Manny's estranged nephew. Although Eve wants to give the young man a chance, Manny warns her against it due to Angel's history and connections to a gang run by Manny's imprisoned brother. During a Founders' Day celebration, a massive sinkhole opens up in the middle of town, swallowing several people, including nomadic former firefighter CJ. The situation is compounded by explosive sewer gas being released by the sinkhole. With the help of volunteers from the crowd, everyone is rescued and expected to survive. However, Sharon returns with the news that the emergency funds that were expected to be used on 42 will instead go to fixing the sinkhole damage. Bode proposes reopening Edgewater's old volunteer fire department as a solution before someone opens fire from outside, hitting Jake.
| 74 | 2 | "Fire Under Fire" | Eagle Egilsson | David Gould | October 16, 2026 | 4.27 |
| 75 | 3 | "What Needs to Be Done" | Kate Phelan | Joe Hortua | October 23, 2026 | 4.20 |
| 76 | 4 | "Winners and Losers" | Quincy Paglaro | Kristi Korzec | October 30, 2026 | 4.21 |
| 77 | 5 | "No Way Out" | Bill Purple | Barbara Kaye Friend | November 6, 2026 | 5.38 |
Following the escape of the inmates with Mickey and Manny, Bode and Boone chase after them while Sharon, Cassidy and Skye, aided by Tex, try to figure out their goal. After a semi crash, Manny slips a phone number he found amongst the inmates' belongings onto the driver. With Boone disguised as a Three Rock inmate, he and Bode use the cleanup to set up a sniper ambush, but it fails and the women escape again. Skye pieces together that the women are after a stolen antique revolver belonging to Harry Love worth $1.5 million. The phone number belongs to the man they were planning to sell the gun to who as it turns out was amongst the hostages, unbeknownst to the inmates. Wanting nothing more to do with the violent rampage, he gives up the location where the gun is buried. The gun is recovered, but Bode and Boone catch up before Crystal can kill Mickey, creating a distraction. Together, the four subdue the inmates while the winds subside in time for a water drop to save them from the fire. Eve agrees to allow Skye to visit Tex while Mickey bids on Manny at the auction and the two finally clear up the misunderstanding from their "date from hell." Bode and Boone blow off the auction to play baseball together. This is the conclusion of a two-part crossover that began on Sheriff Country.
| 78 | 6 | "Church and State" | Leslie Alejandro | Jessica Granger | November 13, 2026 | 4.35 |
| 79 | 7 | "Fight the Future" | Gabriel Correa | Eric Guggenheim & David Gould | December 11, 2026 | TBD |
| 80 | 8 | "Let It Burn" | Gabriel Correa | Eric Guggenheim & David Gould | December 18, 2026 | TBD |

== Production ==
=== Development ===
In November 2021, CBS announced it was developing a series with Thieriot, Tony Phelan, and Joan Rater, based on Thieriot's experiences growing up in Northern California fire country. The potential series was then known as Cal Fire. In February 2022, a series pilot was green-lit. The pilot was written by Phelan and Rater, with Thieriot as co-writer, and directed by James Strong. In May 2022, CBS picked up the series, now titled Fire Country. Tia Napolitano would serve as the series showrunner. On October 19, 2022, the series received a full season order. On January 6, 2023, CBS renewed the series for a second season. On March 12, 2024, the series was renewed for a third season. On February 20, 2025, CBS renewed the series for a fourth season. On January 22, 2026, CBS renewed the series for a fifth season.

=== Filming ===
Filming for the first season began on July 21, 2022, in Vancouver, Canada, and concluded on April 5, 2023. The series uses the nearby village of Fort Langley to portray the fictional Northern California town of Edgewater. In addition, establishing shots for the town of Edgewater were filmed in Rio Dell, in Humboldt County, California, where the show is set. Filming for the second season began on December 11, 2023, and concluded on April 4, 2024. Filming for the third season began on July 11, 2024, and concluded on February 26, 2025. Filming for the fourth season began on July 14, 2025, and concluded on March 5, 2026.

=== Casting ===
In February 2022, it was announced that Thieriot would star in the series. In March 2022, Burke and Alejandro were given lead roles in the pilot. A few days later, it was announced that Farr, Calloway, Arcila, and Latimer would be appearing as series regulars. In September 2022, it was announced that Trucco would be joining the show in a recurring role. In January 2023, it was reported that Zach Tinker joined the cast in an undisclosed capacity. In March 2023, it was announced that Rebecca Mader and Kanoa Goo were cast in recurring roles. In December 2023, it was reported that Rafael de la Fuente joined the cast in a recurring capacity for the second season. On December 15, 2023, it was reported that casting was currently underway for a new character in season 2, who would possibly become the main character in a spinoff. On December 19, 2023, it was reported that Tye White and Jason O'Mara would also join the cast in a recurring capacity for the second season. On August 1, 2024, Leven Rambin was cast in recurring role for the third season. In June 2026, Olivia Thirlby was cast as a new series regular for fifth season.

== Broadcast ==
Fire Country premiered on October 7, 2022, on CBS in the United States. It is also available on Paramount+ via subscription and on Pluto TV for free. The second season premiered on February 16, 2024. The third season premiered on October 18, 2024. The fourth season premiered on October 17, 2025. The first season is also available on Netflix. The fifth season premiered on October 9, 2026.

In Australia on January 11, 2023, on Network 10.

In New Zealand, the series is available on TVNZ 2.

== Reception ==
=== Critical response ===
The review aggregator website Rotten Tomatoes reported a 44% approval rating with an average rating of 4.3/10 for the first season, based on nine critic reviews. Metacritic, which uses a weighted average, assigned a score of 56 out of 100 based on seven critic reviews, indicating "mixed or average reviews".

Katie Dowd, writing for SFGate, accused Fire Country of being exploitative and "inaccurate."

=== Cal Fire response ===
Before the show's release, Cal Fire Chief Joe Tyler released a statement denying any involvement in the show's creation, saying that "this television series is a misrepresentation of the professional all-hazards fire department and resource protection agency that Cal Fire is." Particular objection was made to a scene in the series' trailer involving an inmate fighting a member of Cal Fire.

Tim Edwards, the president of Cal Fire's union, Local 2881, added that "we have spoken with our legal team, and we cannot prevent the series from airing or using the Cal Fire name." An attempt was made to legally require a disclaimer before and after each episode that disavowed involvement from Cal Fire, but was unsuccessful. After seeing the full pilot, Edwards continued to disapprove of the show and added criticism over inmates not being punished for multiple rule violations that would normally result in an immediate return to prison.

Showrunner Tia Napolitano replied to the criticisms saying, "I had almost no response. I know we are making an entertainment show. It's not a documentary. We do our absolute best." Jeff Snider, a retired firefighter and one of the show's consultants, noted the New York City Police Department did not comment on the realism of Law & Order and said Cal Fire's unusual response was because "just in general with firefighters, we are very good at finding the flaw with each other."

=== Ratings ===
==== Overall ====
Viewership and ratings per season of Fire Country
| Season | Timeslot (ET) | Episodes | First aired | | Last aired | | TV season | Viewership rank | Avg. viewers (millions) | 18–49 rank | Avg. 18–49 rating |
| Season | Timeslot (ET) | Episodes | Date | Viewers (millions) | Date | Viewers (millions) | TV season | Viewership rank | Avg. viewers (millions) | 18–49 rank | Avg. 18–49 rating |
|---|---|---|---|---|---|---|---|---|---|---|---|
| 1 | Friday 9:00 p.m. | 22 | October 7, 2022 | 5.91 | May 19, 2023 | 5.32 | 2022–23 | 12 | 8.96 | 17 | 0.81 |
| 2 | Friday 9:00 p.m. | 10 | February 16, 2024 | 5.71 | May 17, 2024 | 5.22 | 2023–24 | 16 | 7.31 | 27 (Note: Tied with The Masked Singer.) | 0.63 |
| 3 | Friday 9:00 p.m. (1–19); Friday 10:00 p.m. (20) | 20 | October 18, 2024 | 4.55 | April 25, 2025 | 3.97 | 2024–25 | 18 | 9.45 | 16 | 1.55 |
| 4 | Friday 8:00 p.m. (1); Friday 9:00 p.m. (2–20) | 20 | October 17, 2025 | 4.11 | May 22, 2026 | N/A | 2025–26 | TBD | TBD | TBD | TBD |
| 5 | Friday 9:00 p.m. | TBA | October 9, 2026 | 4.29 | TBA | TBD | 2026–27 | TBD | TBD | TBD | TBD |

==== Season 1 ====
Viewership and ratings per episode of Fire Country
| No. | Title | Air date | Rating (18–49) | Viewers (millions) | DVR (18–49) | DVR viewers (millions) | Total (18–49) | Total viewers (millions) |
|---|---|---|---|---|---|---|---|---|
| 1 | "Pilot" | October 7, 2022 | 0.4 | 5.91 | 0.3 | 2.35 | 0.7 | 8.26 |
| 2 | "The Fresh Prince of Edgewater" | October 14, 2022 | 0.5 | 5.80 | 0.3 | 2.45 | 0.7 | 8.25 |
| 3 | "Where There's Smoke..." | October 21, 2022 | 0.5 | 5.26 | 0.3 | 2.14 | 0.7 | 7.39 |
| 4 | "Work, Don't Worry" | October 28, 2022 | 0.5 | 5.30 | 0.3 | 2.59 | 0.8 | 7.89 |
| 5 | "Get Some, Be Safe" | November 4, 2022 | 0.4 | 5.53 | 0.3 | 2.45 | 0.7 | 7.98 |
| 6 | "Like Old Times" | November 18, 2022 | 0.4 | 5.47 | —N/a | —N/a | —N/a | —N/a |
| 7 | "Happy to Help" | December 2, 2022 | 0.4 | 5.46 | —N/a | —N/a | —N/a | —N/a |
| 8 | "Bad Guy" | December 9, 2022 | 0.4 | 5.59 | —N/a | —N/a | —N/a | —N/a |
| 9 | "No Good Deed" | January 6, 2023 | 0.6 | 6.57 | 0.3 | 2.43 | 0.9 | 9.00 |
| 10 | "Get Your Hopes Up" | January 13, 2023 | 0.5 | 5.95 | 0.3 | 2.46 | 0.8 | 8.41 |
| 11 | "Mama Bear" | January 20, 2023 | 0.5 | 6.10 | 0.3 | 2.71 | 0.9 | 8.81 |
| 12 | "Two Pink Lines" | January 29, 2023 | 1.9 | 10.08 | —N/a | —N/a | —N/a | —N/a |
| 13 | "You Know Your Dragon Best" | February 3, 2023 | 0.5 | 6.37 | —N/a | —N/a | —N/a | —N/a |
| 14 | "A Fair to Remember" | February 10, 2023 | 0.5 | 6.49 | —N/a | —N/a | —N/a | —N/a |
| 15 | "False Promises" | March 3, 2023 | 0.5 | 6.00 | —N/a | —N/a | —N/a | —N/a |
| 16 | "My Kinda Leader" | March 10, 2023 | 0.4 | 5.59 | —N/a | —N/a | —N/a | —N/a |
| 17 | "A Cry for Help" | March 31, 2023 | 0.4 | 5.27 | —N/a | —N/a | —N/a | —N/a |
| 18 | "Off the Rails" | April 7, 2023 | 0.4 | 6.09 | —N/a | —N/a | —N/a | —N/a |
| 19 | "Watch Your Step" | April 21, 2023 | 0.4 | 5.82 | —N/a | —N/a | —N/a | —N/a |
| 20 | "At the End of My Rope" | May 5, 2023 | 0.3 | 5.32 | —N/a | —N/a | —N/a | —N/a |
| 21 | "Backfire" | May 12, 2023 | 0.4 | 5.06 | —N/a | —N/a | —N/a | —N/a |
| 22 | "I Know It Feels Impossible" | May 19, 2023 | 0.4 | 5.32 | —N/a | —N/a | —N/a | —N/a |

==== Season 2 ====
Viewership and ratings per episode of Fire Country
| No. | Title | Air date | Rating (18–49) | Viewers (millions) | DVR (18–49) | DVR viewers (millions) | Total (18–49) | Total viewers (millions) | Ref. |
|---|---|---|---|---|---|---|---|---|---|
| 1 | "Something's Coming" | February 16, 2024 | 0.5 | 5.71 | —N/a | —N/a | —N/a | —N/a | |
| 2 | "Like Breathing Again" | February 23, 2024 | 0.4 | 5.23 | —N/a | —N/a | —N/a | —N/a | |
| 3 | "See You Next Apocalypse" | March 1, 2024 | 0.4 | 5.25 | —N/a | —N/a | —N/a | —N/a | |
| 4 | "Too Many Unknowns" | March 15, 2024 | 0.4 | 5.06 | 0.2 | 1.75 | 0.6 | 6.80 (Note: Live +7 ratings were not available, so Live +3 ratings have been used instead.) | |
| 5 | "This Storm Will Pass" | April 5, 2024 | 0.4 | 4.95 | 0.2 | 2.26 | 0.6 | 7.21 | |
| 6 | "Alert the Sheriff" | April 12, 2024 | 0.4 | 5.05 | 0.2 | 2.09 | 0.6 | 7.14 | |
| 7 | "A Hail Mary" | April 26, 2024 | 0.3 | 5.06 | 0.3 | 2.22 | 0.6 | 7.28 | |
| 8 | "It's Not Over" | May 3, 2024 | 0.4 | 5.00 | 0.2 | 2.15 | 0.6 | 7.15 | |
| 9 | "No Future, No Consequences" | May 10, 2024 | 0.3 | 4.67 | 0.3 | 2.12 | 0.6 | 6.78 | |
| 10 | "I Do" | May 17, 2024 | 0.4 | 5.22 | 0.2 | 1.90 | 0.6 | 7.12 | |

==== Season 3 ====
Viewership and ratings per episode of Fire Country
| No. | Title | Air date | Rating (18–49) | Viewers (millions) | DVR (18–49) | DVR viewers (millions) | Total (18–49) | Total viewers (millions) | Ref. |
|---|---|---|---|---|---|---|---|---|---|
| 1 | "What the Bride Said" | October 18, 2024 | 0.4 | 4.55 | 0.2 | 2.00 | 0.5 | 6.55 | |
| 2 | "Firing Squad" | October 25, 2024 | 0.3 | 4.33 | 0.2 | 1.94 | 0.6 | 6.28 | |
| 3 | "Welcome to the Cult" | November 1, 2024 | 0.4 | 4.60 | 0.3 | 2.04 | 0.7 | 6.64 | |
| 4 | "Keep Your Cool" | November 8, 2024 | 0.4 | 4.46 | 0.2 | 1.92 | 0.6 | 6.38 | |
| 5 | "Edgewater's About to Get Real Cozy" | November 15, 2024 | 0.2 | 4.26 | 0.3 | 2.01 | 0.5 | 6.27 | |
| 6 | "Not Without My Birds" | November 22, 2024 | 0.4 | 4.74 | 0.2 | 1.94 | 0.6 | 6.68 | |
| 7 | "False Alarm" | December 6, 2024 | 0.3 | 4.51 | 0.3 | 1.95 | 0.6 | 6.46 | |
| 8 | "Promise Me" | December 13, 2024 | 0.3 | 4.54 | 0.2 | 1.94 | 0.5 | 6.49 | |
| 9 | "Coming in Hot" | January 31, 2025 | 0.3 | 3.80 | 0.2 | 1.81 | 0.5 | 5.56 | |
| 10 | "The Leone Way" | February 7, 2025 | 0.3 | 4.34 | 0.1 | 1.80 | 0.4 | 6.14 | |
| 11 | "Fare Thee Well" | February 14, 2025 | 0.3 | 4.12 | 0.2 | 1.71 | 0.5 | 5.83 | |
| 12 | "I'm The One Who Just Goes Away" | February 21, 2025 | 0.4 | 4.47 | 0.2 | 1.81 | 0.6 | 6.28 | |
| 13 | "My Team" | February 28, 2025 | 0.3 | 4.29 | 0.2 | 1.78 | 0.5 | 6.06 | |
| 14 | "Death Trap" | March 7, 2025 | 0.3 | 4.12 | 0.2 | 1.77 | 0.5 | 5.88 | |
| 15 | "One Last Time" | March 14, 2025 | 0.4 | 4.24 | 0.2 | 1.66 | 0.5 | 5.69 | |
| 16 | "Dirty Money" | April 4, 2025 | 0.3 | 4.00 | 0.2 | 1.87 | 0.5 | 5.81 | |
| 17 | "Fire and Ice" | April 11, 2025 | 0.3 | 4.21 | 0.2 | 1.81 | 0.5 | 6.03 | |
| 18 | "Eyes and Ears Everywhere" | April 18, 2025 | 0.4 | 4.30 | 0.1 | 1.63 | 0.5 | 5.93 | |
| 19 | "A Change in the Wind" | April 25, 2025 | 0.4 | 3.97 | 0.2 | 1.57 | 0.5 | 5.54 | |
| 20 | "I'd Do It Again" | April 25, 2025 | 0.4 | 3.97 | 0.2 | 1.57 | 0.5 | 5.54 | |

==== Season 4 ====
Viewership and ratings per episode of Fire Country
| No. | Title | Air date | Rating (18–49) | Viewers (millions) | DVR (18–49) | DVR viewers (millions) | Total (18–49) | Total viewers (millions) | Ref. |
|---|---|---|---|---|---|---|---|---|---|
| 1 | "Goodbye for Now" | October 17, 2025 | 0.3 | 4.11 | 0.1 | 1.58 | 0.4 | 5.69 | |
| 2 | "Not a Stray" | October 24, 2025 | 0.2 | 3.88 | 0.1 | 1.24 | 0.3 | 5.11 | |
| 3 | "The Tiny Ways We Start to Heal" | October 31, 2025 | 0.2 | 3.52 | 0.1 | 1.55 | 0.3 | 5.07 | |
| 4 | "Like a Wounded Wildebeest" | November 7, 2025 | 0.2 | 3.86 | 0.1 | 1.44 | 0.3 | 5.31 | |
| 5 | "Happy First Day, Manny" | November 14, 2025 | 0.2 | 3.86 | —N/a | —N/a | —N/a | —N/a | |
| 6 | "Your Voice in My Head" | November 21, 2025 | 0.2 | 3.70 | —N/a | —N/a | —N/a | —N/a | |

== Spin-offs ==
On January 23, 2024, it was reported that a proposed spin-off of Fire Country would be introduced via a back-door pilot episode in season 2 with Morena Baccarin attached to lead. The episode titled "Alert the Sheriff" introduced Baccarin's character, Edgewater County Sheriff's Sergeant Mickey Fox. On May 2, 2024, it received a straight-to-series order, with CBS Studios joining the production of what would later be titled Sheriff Country, with filming set to take place in Toronto, rather than in Vancouver like the original, so Baccarin could be closer to her family in New York.

A fall 2025 premiere was confirmed in March 2025 with a promo airing during broadcasts of March Madness. The castings of Matt Lauria, Christopher Gorham, Michele Weaver were announced in April 2025, joining the previously announced W. Earl Brown. Production on the spin-off began in May 2025 in the Toronto area with twelve scripts already written, and in July 2025 the premiere date was set for October 17, with the show airing regularly before the original on Fridays after the premiere. The first teaser trailer was released in August 2025.

A second spin-off featuring Jared Padalecki has also been under consideration since 2024.
