= Nebraska City High School =

Location
- 141 Steinhart Park Rd. Nebraska City, Otoe County, Nebraska 68410; United States; 40°40′42″N 95°52′45″W

Information
- Type: Public
- Enrollment: 445 (January 2012)
- Colors: Purple and gold
- Song: The Purple and Gold
- Athletics conference: Trailblazer Conference
- Sports: Football, baseball, basketball, golf, tennis, cross country, soccer, softball, track, volleyball, and wrestling
- Mascot: Pioneer Pete
- Team name: Pioneers
- School day: 8:00 – 3:40
- Athletic director: Matthew Thompson
- Website: Nebraska City High School

Nebraska City High School (NCHS, formerly NCSH) is the public secondary school in Nebraska City, Nebraska, United States. It serves 9th through 12th grades. The athletic teams of all Nebraska City Public Schools are named the Pioneers. NCHS is located at 141 Steinhart Park Road.

== History ==
1880 saw the first graduating class of NCHS, with the first graduate being Cornelia Kimmel.

The current building was not the first high school in Nebraska City. Its predecessor was the first in Nebraska. Partially for this and other reasons, such as being the home of Arbor Day and being the oldest town in the state, the athletic team's name (then the "Golden Avalanches" or, unofficially, the "Purples") was changed to the "Pioneers" in December 1938. The school's newspaper has, since the early 1900s, been referred to as the Otoean, deriving its name from its home – Otoe County. Many changes were made to the school in the 1930s and 1940s, including the first dances, first library, first mirrors and first yearbooks. During this time, Nebraska City regularly competed in the International Soap Box Derbies, including a World Championship at the fourth annual. In 1921, the NCHS Golden Avalanches won the State Basketball Championship.

== Buildings ==
The original school was built in 1865 on 6th Street and between 4th and 5th Corsos. It was the first public high school between the Missouri River and California. The second building was constructed in 1874 between 9th and 10th Streets on 1st Corso. The Sixth Street Elementary later occupied the original building until its destruction in 1916.

In 1911, a third high school was built on the same block as the second. This complex was known as the "Gray Buildings" and was east of the earlier building. The second school was demolished and replaced with the Morton James Public Library. At this point, NCHS contained grades 9-12. In 1928, a junior high school was built across 9th Street. This school contained grades 7 to 9. In 1945, the schools switched buildings to accommodate the growing student population. Along with this came a "hot lunch" program along with choir and band rooms.

The current site at 141 Steinhart Park Road was selected for a new building for an even larger student population. This building was completed in 1965. The junior high school moved back to its original building, and the "Gray Buildings" complex was replaced by a Safeway store. This was then destroyed for a new middle school next to the library, and 9th Street between 1st and 2nd Corsos was replaced with a recreation field for the middle school.

=== Expansions ===
The current building was erected in 1965, replacing the earlier schools in the downtown area. The original design—a brick building with the gym at one end, auditorium and cafeteria in the center, with classrooms in the north—is little changed. Expansions in the 1979 on this north section added what are now the outer classrooms, the library and the athletic complexes. From 2008 to 2011, the school underwent a major renovation with the addition of a second gym, a turf field, a new cafeteria, a new fine arts rooms, new wood and metal workshops and new offices.

== Sports ==
=== Overview ===
The official team name is the Nebraska City Pioneers, and their mascot is Pioneer Pete. The school's and athletic colors are purple and gold.

=== Pioneer Palace ===
Until the last expansion, the Pioneers competed in the Pioneer Palace. This differs from most other gyms, in terms of the size, cramped conditions, sparse, mellow lighting and a high number of random "dead spots" in the floor. It has been speculated that a home field advantage aided Pioneer basketball teams through their years in the Palace. With the construction in the 2000s, a new gym was built, the Purple Gym, the old one remaining as a backup called the Gold Gym. The new gym has bright lighting, is longer, has direct access to the band room, has new locker rooms for girls, and bleachers that are purple and gold with "NCHS" on the side.

=== Pioneer Field ===
The Pioneer Field and track is the competing grounds for Pioneers football, track and soccer teams. From at least 1911 until 1978, the Pioneer Field was a large structure on the terraces between 1st and 4th Corsos and between 14th and 15th Streets. In 1978, an elementary school was built to replace the 6th Street and 14th Street Building, now Hayward Elementary. In the 1978 season, the Pioneers competed at the Peru State College campus. By 1979, the current stadium was completed. This was refurbished in 2011 with field turf and a new track surface.

=== History ===
From at least 1918, the Nebraska City High School's colors have been various shades of purple and gold. The school song, "The Purple and the Gold", was written some time between 1908 and 1918, and its main lyrics have been relatively unchanged. Until 1938, the teams were officially named the Golden Avalanches, and from 1938 onward they have been named the Pioneers.

=== State results ===
Year	Award	Scope	Recipient	Notes
1915	Track and field, boys' mile	All classes	Nelson, ___	
1916	Track and field, boys' mile	All classes	Nelson, ___	
1919	Basketball (boys') runner-up	Class D	Team	
1921	Basketball (boys') champion	Class B	Team	
1946	Track and field, boys' mile	All classes	Marvin Zimmerman	
1948	Track and field, boys' mile	All classes	Marvin Zimmerman	
1955	Track and field, boys' 200	All classes	George Peterson	
1956	Track and field, boys' 100	All classes	George Peterson	Still the stand-alone school record.
1956	Track and field, boys' 200	All classes	George Peterson	First Pioneer to receive medals in two events.
1960	Golf, boys' champion	Class A	Ed Romjue	
1968	Wrestling, heavyweight champion	Class B	Jack Hobbie	First of several Pioneer wrestling titles.
1969	Wrestling, heavyweight champion	Class B	Jack Hobbie	
1979	Track and field, girls' mile relay	All classes	Porter, Hermann, Nienkamp, Soriano	Last year for event.
1980	Track and field, boys' long jump	All classes	Bret Clark	
1985	Track and field, boys' 3200-meter	All classes	Harald Graham	State champion team
1985	Track and field champions	Class B	Team	First team title since 1921.
1987	Wrestling, 138 lb champion	Class B	Brad Smith	
1988	Wrestling, 189 lb champion	Class B	Brian Duran	
1989	Wrestling, 189 lb champion	Class B	Brian Duran	
1989	Wrestling tournament third place	Class B	Team	
1991	Golf, boys' champion	Class B	Jason Schoo	
1992	Wrestling, 135 lb champion	Class B	John Tharp	
1994	Track and field, boys' long jump	All classes	Troy Crook	
1996	Wrestling, 130 lb champion	Class B	Shane Allgood	
1999	Track and field, girls' discus	All classes	Emily Duran	
2000	Track and field, girls' discus	All classes	Emily Duran	Set Class B state meet record, 165-0, same year.
2000	Track and field, girls' shot put	All classes	Emily Duran	Second Pioneer to receive medals in two events.
2001	Wrestling, 189 lb champion	Class B	Jason Stoll	
2008	Golf runner-up	Class B	Team	Team included two top-ten finishers.
2013	Wrestling duals runner-up	Class B	Team	Inaugural duals tournament. Ended sixth in regular tourney.
2014	Wrestling duals fourth place	Class B	Team	Ended seventh in regular tourney.
2022	Wrestling, 220 lb champion	Class B	Micah Ruiz	

Note: All track entries are for gold medalists only.

== See also ==
- Lourdes Central Catholic School
