= Jordan Foley =

American independent film producer

- Born: March 9, 1979 (age 47); Saint Paul, Minnesota, U.S.
- Occupation: Film producer
- Notable work: Snack Shack

Jordan Foley (born March 9, 1979, in Saint Paul, Minnesota) is an American independent film producer.

== Selected filmography ==
=== As producer ===
- Snack Shack (2024)
- Who Are You People (2022)
- Gossamer Folds (2021)
- Alone (2020)
- All Square (2018)
- Desolate (2018)
- Puncture (2011)
- The Open Road (2009)

=== As executive producer ===
- American Woman (2018)
