= Conor Sherry =

American actor

- Education: University of California, Los Angeles (Sociology)
- Occupation: Actor
- Years active: 2022–present

Conor Sherry is an American actor.

In 2024, Sherry starred in the film Snack Shack with Gabriel LaBelle playing 14-year-old best friends. In 2025, he played Terry Gilmore, the youngest son of Happy Gilmore in Happy Gilmore 2. He also began portraying Tyler Mackenzie in Fire Country.

He's a vegetarian.

== Early life ==
He graduated Archbishop Mitty High School in 2019.

In 2019, he won the national championship in Humorous Interpretation of National Speech and Debate Association. His performance can be seen on Youtube

He co-founded with his mom in 2020 Breakthrough Coaching to offer online training for speech students.

== Education ==
He graduated from University of California, Los Angeles with a degree in Sociology in 2024.

== Career ==
Conor's first role was in The Terminal List where he performed the recurring role of TJ Howard for three episodes. Afterwards, he performed in his breakout role as a lead actor in the feature film Snack Shack. He mentions his self-tape audition was made while he was sick with COVID-19, which might have helped portray the scene in which the character was having an allergic reaction.

== Filmography ==
=== Film ===
Year	Title	Role	Notes
2022	The Devil You Know	Kyle	
2024	Snack Shack	A.J.	
2025	Happy Gilmore 2	Terry	

=== Television ===
Year	Title	Role	Notes
2022	The Terminal List	TJ Howard	
2022	Are You Afraid of the Dark?	Max	
2025	Fire Country	Tyler Mackenzie	
