= The Bunny Game =

2011 American independent horror film

- Directed by: Adam Rehmeier
- Written by: Rodleen Getsic; Adam Rehmeier
- Produced by: Rodleen Getsic; Adam Rehmeier
- Starring: Rodleen Getsic
- Cinematography: Adam Rehmeier
- Edited by: Adam Rehmeier
- Production company: Death Mountain Productions
- Distributed by: Autonomy Pictures (United States)
- Release date: 2011
- Running time: 76 minutes
- Country: United States
- Language: English
- Budget: $13,000

The Bunny Game is a 2011 American independent horror film directed by Adam Rehmeier and written by Rehmeier and Rodleen Getsic, who also stars. The film follows a drug-addicted sex worker who is abducted by a truck driver and subjected to prolonged physical and sexual abuse.

Shot in black and white on a reported budget of $13,000, the film was made with Rehmeier working as a one-person crew. Getsic drew partly on her own experience of abduction in developing her performance. In October 2011, the British Board of Film Classification (BBFC) refused the film a certificate for video release in the United Kingdom because of its treatment of sexualized violence.

== Plot ==
Bunny is a prostitute with a cocaine addiction. She is shown having sex with clients, using the money to buy cocaine and walking the streets looking for more work.

She meets a truck driver identified in the credits as Hog. He asks whether she has an addiction, and she tells him that she does. When she offers him sex for money, he refuses, drugs her and takes her to the back of his truck. While Bunny is unconscious, Hog cuts off her clothes and begins touching and tormenting her. She later wakes up naked and handcuffed.

Hog keeps Bunny captive for several days. He shaves her head, brands her with the shape of a caduceus, runs knives across her skin and repeatedly assaults her. He also shows her footage of another woman being abused. He takes Bunny outside and drags her on a leash through the desert.

During the "Bunny Game", Hog puts a rabbit mask on Bunny and wears a hog mask himself. He releases her into the desert and chases her before taking her back to the truck.

When the rear door of the truck is later left open, Bunny escapes. She runs naked through the desert, crying and laughing, but Hog catches her. He places her on a crucifix and tells her that they will draw straws. If Bunny draws the long straw, she wins; if she draws the short one, Hog wins. Bunny draws what appears to be the longer straw, although the full length of the other straw is not shown.

Hog then carries Bunny over his back. He has been in contact with a man named Jonas and arranges to meet him. In the final scene, a man dressed in white arrives in a white, windowless van. Bunny, apparently unconscious, is placed in the back of the van. The van drives away, and Bunny's fate is left unknown.

== Cast ==
- Rodleen Getsic as Bunny
- Jeff Renfro as Hog
- Gregg Gilmore as Jonas
- Drettie Page as Martyr

== Production ==
Rehmeier and Getsic began developing The Bunny Game in 2006. Gregg Gilmore, who had previously worked with Rehmeier, was originally intended to play Hog but withdrew shortly before production because of concerns about the violent nature of the role. Jeff Renfro, a non-professional actor, subsequently took the part.

Principal photography took place in 2008 over 13 days in Hollywood and a nearby desert. Rehmeier served as the production's sole crew member and was responsible for the cinematography and editing. The film was shot in black and white and had a budget of $13,000.

Getsic's performance was informed by her own experience of having been abducted as a teenager. She described the production as a means of confronting earlier trauma, while Rehmeier characterized the film as a cautionary work rather than conventional entertainment. Film scholar Jenny Barrett notes that Rehmeier allowed the actors considerable freedom within loosely defined parameters and describes the resulting film as a collision of drama and documentary.

== Release ==
The Bunny Game screened at several film festivals in 2011, including the Heavy Metal Film Festival in Los Angeles and the PollyGrind Film Festival in Las Vegas. At PollyGrind, it won the festival's top jury prize, "The Biggest Baddest Mother of the PollyGrind", along with awards for sound design, cinematography and editing. Getsic won Best Overall Individual Performance in a Film.

On October 12, 2011, the BBFC refused to classify the film for video release in the United Kingdom. The board cited the film's depiction of the sexual and physical abuse of a helpless woman, stating that the use of nudity risked eroticizing the violence and encouraging identification with the perpetrator's sadism. It also said that cuts were unlikely to address these concerns because such material appeared throughout the film.

In March 2012, Autonomy Pictures acquired the film's US distribution rights. The company released the film on DVD and Blu-ray on July 31, 2012.

== Reception ==
Noel Murray of The A.V. Club called the film "brutal" and "repellent", but praised its stark black-and-white photography, extreme angles, close-ups and editing, which he said gave it the quality of a nightmare. He argued, however, that the film exposed the limitations of its "How hardcore can you get?" approach and had little new to offer after its first 20 minutes.

A review for Bloody Disgusting praised Rehmeier's black-and-white cinematography and editing, as well as the performances of Getsic and Renfro, but described the film's treatment of Bunny's abuse as self-indulgent and concluded that it was "ultimately not an experience worth having".

== Analysis ==
Jenny Barrett, writing in Cine-Excess, describes the film as a mixture of documentary and expressionist styles that repeatedly blurs the distinction between fiction and recorded experience. She argues that both approaches draw attention to the presence of the filmmaker and contribute to the objectification of Bunny, making Rehmeier's description of the film as feminist difficult to sustain. Barrett nevertheless finds a possible political reading in its depiction of neglected urban and desert spaces, which she connects to class, gender and the marginalization of sex workers in contemporary America.

James Aston discusses Getsic's performance in relation to trauma, performance art and female disempowerment. He argues that Bunny's passivity reinforces her position as a victim and that the film does not ultimately challenge the capitalist and patriarchal forces associated with her marginal status. Aston also questions whether the film's use of real physical suffering can support the feminist interpretation proposed by its filmmakers.

== See also ==
- List of black-and-white films produced since 1970
- List of works rejected by the BBFC
