= Steinhart Park (Nebraska City) =

Park in Nebraska, United States

Coordinates: 40°40′27″N 95°52′35″W

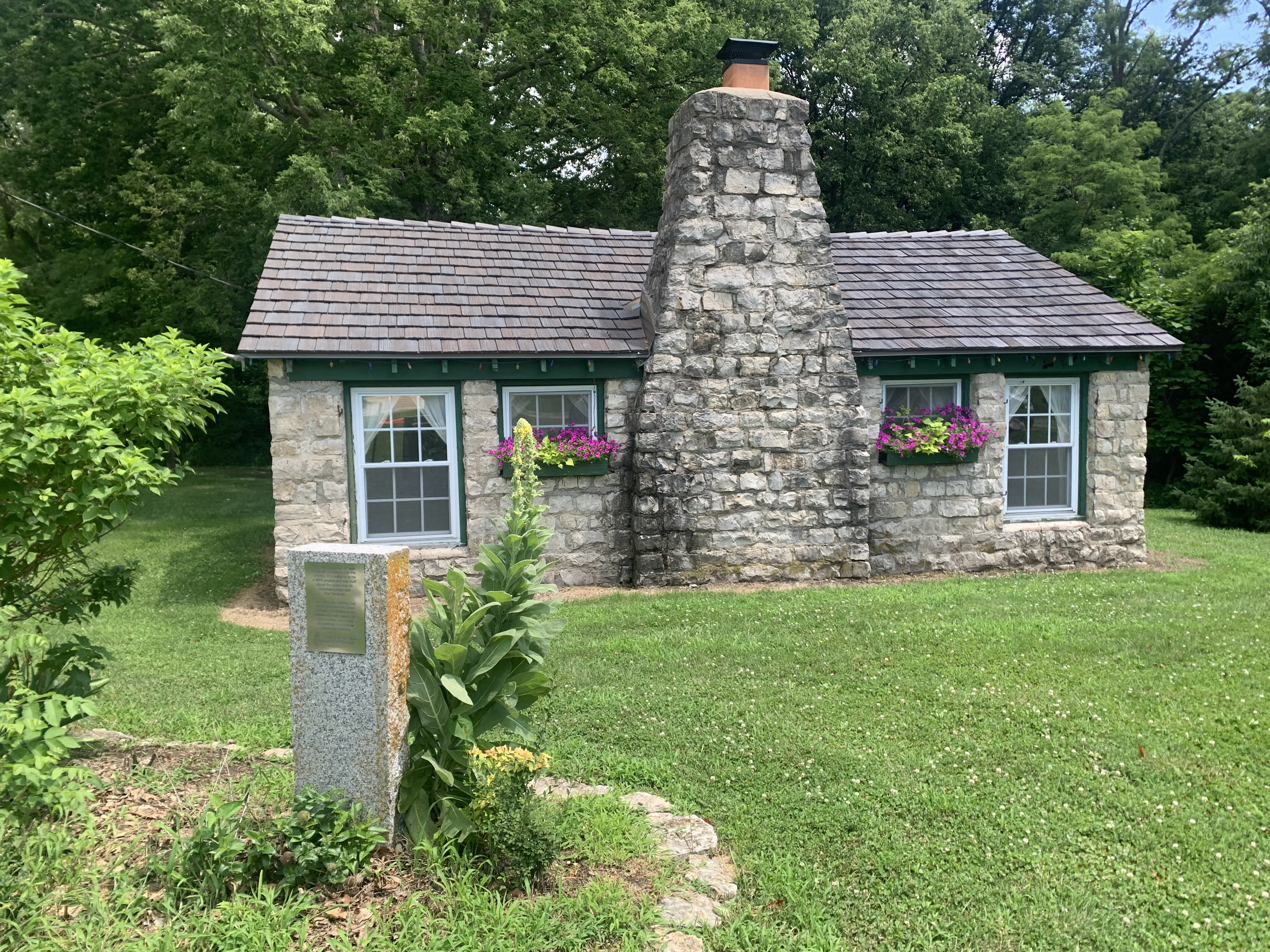
Stone Cabin in Steinhart Park in Nebraska City, Nebraska

Steinhart Park is a recreation area in Nebraska City, Nebraska. It is named after John W. Steinhart, who developed Nebraska City's meat-packing industry, was city postmaster, helped form the public library, Steinhart Park, Nebraska City High School, the Nebraska school for the blind, organized the Chamber of Commerce, and was mayor of Nebraska City. The park includes three baseball diamonds, four tennis courts, a basketball court, a skatepark, a toboggan slide, horseshoe rings, a local swimming pool, and Steinhart Lodge, a convention centre, previously a restaurant.

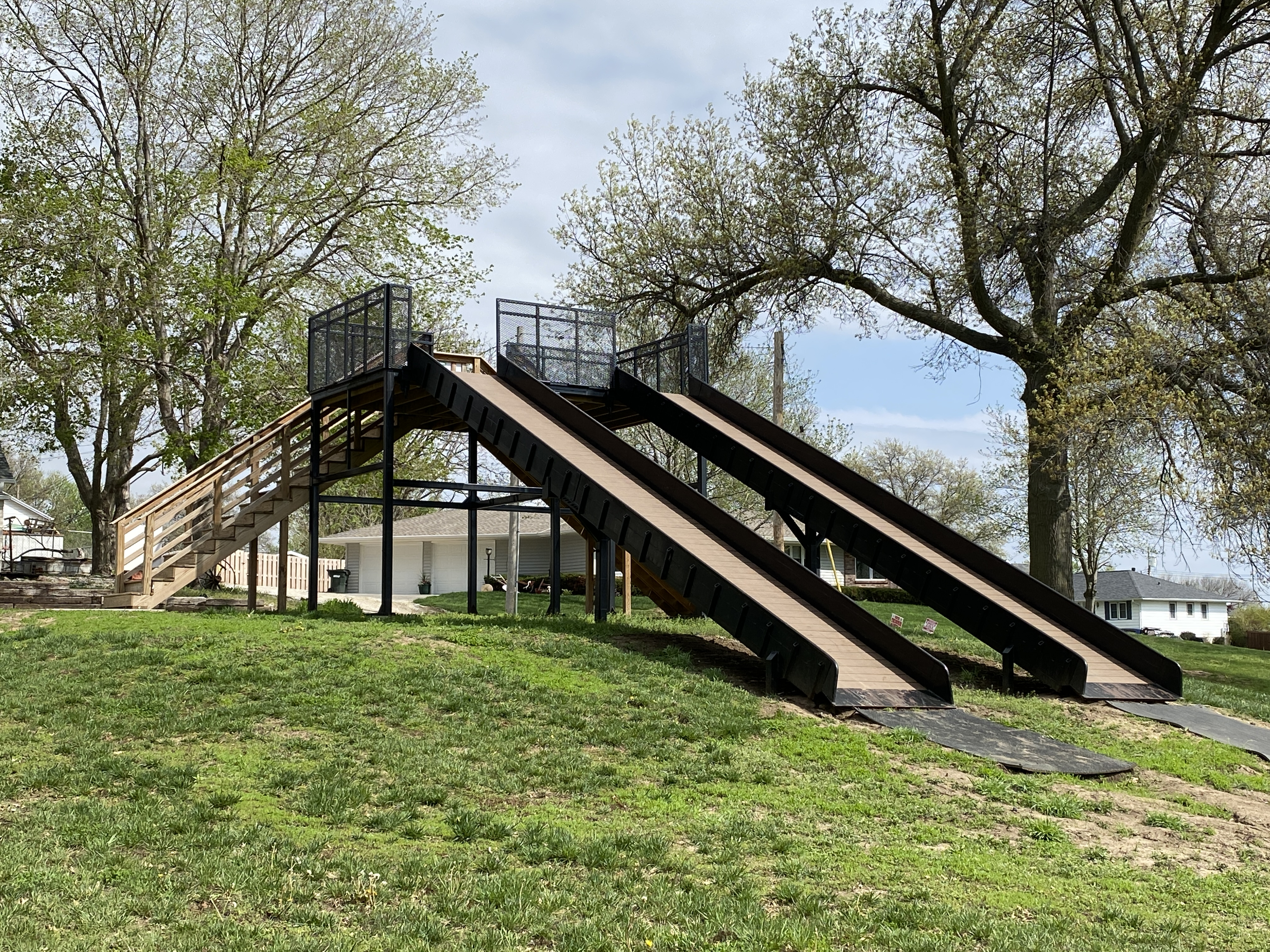
City Park Toboggan Slide
