= Jesse Ray Sheps =

American actor, and musician (born 2005)

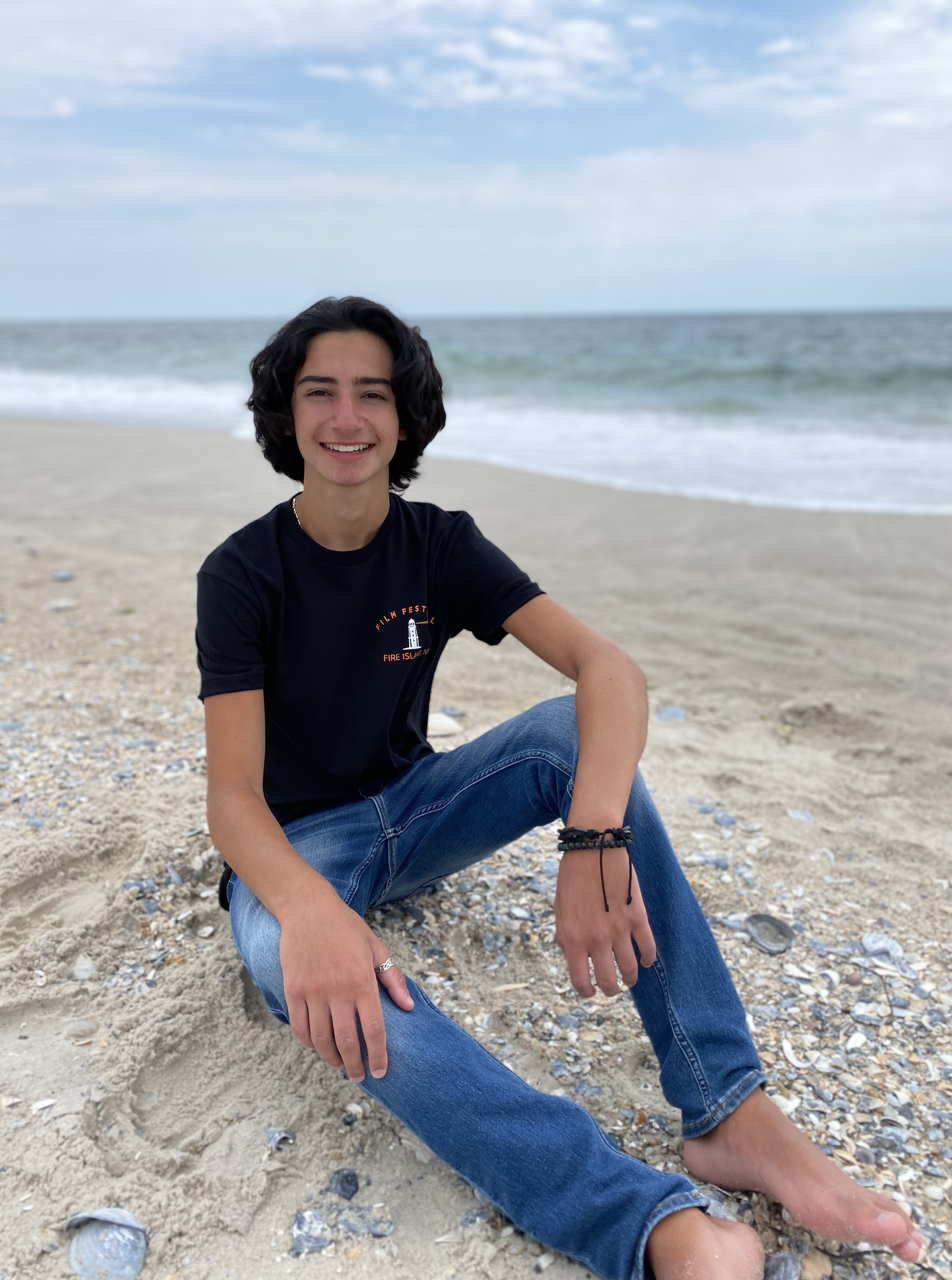
- Born: July 7, 2005 (age 21); Long Island, New York
- Citizenship: American
- Occupations: Actor, model, musician

Jesse Ray Sheps is an American actor, and musician. In 2018, Sheps gained wider recognition for his leading role in the movie All Square, the winner of the Best Narrative Film Award at SXSW, starring in the lead role opposite actors Michael Kelly and Pamela Adlon.

Sheps is the founder and President of the "Fire Island Film Festival", an annual international film festival that had its premiere event in August 2021. The film festival was hosted by Sheps and celebrated over 300 film submissions. It was also a fundraiser for St. Jude Children's Research Hospital.

Sheps is also a published author in national news publications. This includes the Pulitzer Prize winning Gainesville Sun.

== Life and career ==
Sheps is from Long Island, New York. He began his career modeling for large international campaigns for companies such as H&M, Toys R US and AMF Bowling. He started his acting career as a series regular playing “Fluffy” for two seasons in the Nickelodeon cartoon, Zack & Quack, as well as appeared on several Disney and Amazon Television animated series.

Sheps gravitated towards in person television appearances with guest starring roles in television shows such as CBS’s Blue Bloods and Bull. Sheps has also appeared in Netflix’s Orange Is the New Black and in David Frankel’s Collateral Beauty, starring Will Smith and Kate Winslet.

Sheps is also a singer, songwriter and guitarist, working towards the release of his first album. He is also a fundraiser for the St. Jude's Children's Hospital.

Sheps has also written, directed and starred in a new comedy short film called The Talent Show. For his writing and performance Sheps won the best film at two separate film festivals in 2019.

Sheps has a lead role playing David Guiterrez's movie, Such a Funny Life.

For his role as Brian in All Square Sheps was awarded the Best Supporting Actor Role in a film, and the Best Young Actor Award by the Vegas Movie Awards.

== Filmography ==
- 2010: 3rd & Bird (TV Series)
- 2014: Creative Galaxy (TV Series)
- 2014: Annie
- 2016: Hard Sell
- 2016: The Perfect Murder (TV Series)
- 2016: Collateral Beauty
- 2013 - 2016: Zack and Quack (TV Series)
- 2017: Blue Bloods (TV Series)
- 2017: Bull (TV Series)
- 2017: Orange Is the New Black (TV Series)
- 2018: All Square
- TBA: XXistence (TV Mini-Series)
- TBA: Choke (Short)
- TBA: Stash
- TBA: Devil's Five
- TBA: Such a Funny Life
