= Nicholas Weinstock =

American producer and author

Nicholas Weinstock is an American media executive and author.

== Early life and education ==
Weinstock graduated from Harvard University, traveling extensively in Europe and Africa as an undergraduate. Fluent in French, Italian and Swahili, Weinstock studied in Paris and Bologna; spent a semester at the University of Nairobi; and conducted anthropology research in rural Kenya. In 1992 he won a Rotary Scholarship to study at the University of Botswana, where he attended graduate school in literature, and at the University of Cape Town, where he studied fiction under Nobel Prize laureate J.M. Coetzee.

== Career ==
=== Publishing ===
On return from South Africa, Weinstock worked as an editor at Random House and Riverhead Books before becoming a full-time author. His publications include the nonfiction book The Secret Love of Sons and the novels As Long As She Needs Me and The Golden Hour.

=== Speechwriting ===
In 2000 Weinstock was hired by Peter Chernin, then president of News Corporation, to serve as Director of Corporate Communications. A year later Weinstock became chief speechwriter for Rupert Murdoch.

=== Producing ===
In 2004 Weinstock moved to Los Angeles to become Vice President of Comedy Development at Murdoch’s 20th Television (then 20th Century Fox Television). In 2007 director Judd Apatow hired Weinstock to head development at Apatow Productions, where he oversaw Forgetting Sarah Marshall, Step Brothers, Pineapple Express, Get Him to the Greek, and Bridesmaids. Two years later Weinstock reunited with Peter Chernin as a Senior Vice President of Chernin Entertainment.

In 2015 Weinstock joined Ben Stiller’s production company Red Hour. In the role of Creative Head, Weinstock developed the first season of Severance, nominated for 14 Emmy Awards. Weinstock remains an Executive Producer.

In 2021, backed by the British conglomerate Fremantle, Weinstock struck out on his own, founding Invention Studios to develop original series. In 2023, parting ways with Fremantle, Weinstock moved to co-producing low-budget movies. Thelma, featuring 94-year-old June Squibb in her first leading role, premiered at Sundance in 2025. The Saviors, directed by Kevin Hamedani, premiered at SXSW in 2026. In Memoriam, starring Marc Maron, premiered at Tribeca in 2026. Clarissa, a Lagos-set adaptation of Virginia Woolf’s “Mrs. Dalloway,” directed by the Esiri Brothers and produced by Theresa Park, premiered to a standing ovation at Cannes in 2026. Kaet Might Die, an adaptation of Kaet McAnneny's memoir, starring Awkwafina and Ken Jeong, wrapped in 2026.

In 2026 Weinstock co-founded Sweetheart Entertainment with emerging producer Andrea Bucko. In June 2026 Sweetheart entered a first-look deal to develop television for Lloyd Braun’s Prologue Entertainment, while Invention moved from Los Angeles to New York.

== Other work ==
In 2020 Weinstock founded Craft Services, a creative incubator and online community for screenwriters worldwide. Craft Services has over 1,000 members worldwide.

In 2023 Weinstock conceived of a yearlong comedy incubator in Australia. In 2024 he announced a similar initiative in Kenya. Though the program was never funded, Weinstock was invited to the White House for a State Dinner in honor of Kenyan President William Ruto.

Weinstock serves on the boards of the Authors Guild in New York; the annual Africa International Film Festival (AFRIFF) in Nigeria; Pavillon Afriques, the Cannes Film Festival's platform for pan-African cinema; and Harvardwood, a nonprofit organization for Harvard alumni interested in entertainment.

== Awards and accolades ==
Weinstock has developed and produced series that, cumulatively, have been nominated for 53 Primetime Emmy Awards.

In 2022 he was elected to the International Academy of Television Arts and Sciences as a juror of the International Emmy Awards. The same year Severance, which Weinstock executive produces, won its first two Primetime Emmys. The series — a recipient of a Peabody Award, a Writers Guild Award for Best Drama Series, a Golden Globe, and a Critics Choice Super Award — was nominated for 27 Emmys in 2025.
