= T-Street Productions =

American film and television production company

- Trade name: T-Street
- Type: Privately held company
- Industry: Motion pictures Television
- Founded: September 2019; 7 years ago
- Founder: Rian Johnson; Ram Bergman
- Headquarters: Los Angeles, California, United States
- Key people: Rian Johnson; Ram Bergman
- Owner: MRC (minority stake)
- Divisions: T-Street Productions; T-Street Television

T-Street is an American film and television production company led by Rian Johnson and Ram Bergman. The company is responsible for the Knives Out series and the TV shows Poker Face and 3 Body Problem.

== History ==
In September 2019, Rian Johnson and producer Ram Bergman launched T-Street, an entrepreneurial company that will generate original content for film and TV shows. The venture is fully capitalized by global media company Valence Media. T-Street launched with a first look deal with Valence Media's Media Rights Capital for film and television projects. Valence Media holds a substantial minority equity stake in the company. Johnson and Bergman intend to make their own original creations through the company, and produce others.

On October 25, 2019, Nena Rodrigue was named President of Television for T-Street. Rodrigue will have creative oversight of all television projects for the studio. She most recently served as EVP of Programming and Production for BBC America, overseeing original scripted programming at the network following its acquisition by AMC Networks.

On November 14, 2019, it was announced Kiri Hart, Stephen Feder and Ben LeClair had been named producers at T-Street. Hart most recently served as Lucasfilm's Senior Vice President of Development from 2012 to 2018. Feder most recently served as Vice President of Film Development at Lucasfilm, reporting to Hart. LeClair most recently had a first-look deal with Blumhouse Television, and in 2018 was nominated by Film Independent for the Piaget Producers Award. Leopold Hughes and Nikos Karamigios were also named producers at T-Street.

== Productions ==
=== Films ===
Year	Title	Director	Co-production with	Distributor	Budget	Gross
2019	Knives Out	Rian Johnson	MRC Film	Lionsgate	$40 million	$311.4 million
2022	Glass Onion	Rian Johnson	N/A	Netflix	$40 million	$15 million
2023	Fair Play	Chloe Domont	MRC Film; Star Thrower Entertainment	Netflix	N/A	N/A
2023	American Fiction	Cord Jefferson	MRC Film; 3 Arts Entertainment	Orion Pictures (through Amazon MGM Studios)	$10 million	$23 million
2024	Snack Shack	Adam Carter Rehmeier	MRC Film; Paperclip Limited	Republic Pictures	$4.5 million	$455,708
2025	Wake Up Dead Man	Rian Johnson	N/A	Netflix	TBA	TBA
2026	The Only Living Pickpocket in New York	Noah Segan	MRC Film	Sony Pictures Classics	TBA	TBA
TBA	2034	Joseph Gordon-Levitt	N/A	Netflix	TBA	TBA

=== Television series ===
Year	Title	Creator(s) / Developer(s)	Co-production with	Notes	Network
2023–2025	Poker Face	Rian Johnson	Zucks. Animal Pictures; MRC Television		Peacock
2024–present	3 Body Problem	David Benioff; D.B. Weiss; Alexander Woo	BLB; The Three-Body Universe; Plan B Entertainment; Primitive Streak		Netflix
July 16, 2026	The Hawk	Will Ferrell; Harper Steele; Chris Henchy	Gloria Sanchez Productions		Netflix
TBA	Disinherited	Peter Gould	Crystal Diner; FX Productions		FX; FX on Hulu

== Awards and recognition ==
- 2024 Academy Award Win, Best Adapted Screenplay (American Fiction)
- 2020 Golden Globe Award Nomination, Best Motion Picture – Musical or Comedy (Knives Out)
- 2020 Academy Award Nomination, Best Original Screenplay (Knives Out)
- 2023 Golden Globe Award Nomination, Best Motion Picture - Musical or Comedy (Glass Onion: A Knives Out Mystery)
- 2023 Academy Award Nomination, Best Adapted Screenplay (Glass Onion: A Knives Out Mystery)
- 2024 Golden Globe Award Nomination, Best Picture - Musical or Comedy (American Fiction)
- 2024 Academy Award Nomination, Best Picture (American Fiction)
