= Bachiatari Bōryoku Ningen =

- DVD cover
- Directed by: Kōji Shiraishi; Akihiro Kasai
- Written by: Kōji Shiraishi; Akihiro Kasai
- Produced by: Creative AXA
- Starring: Takeshi Yamamoto; Akihiro Kasai; Tsugumi Nagasawa; Shigeo Ōsako; Kōji Shiraishi
- Edited by: Kōji Shiraishi; Akihiro Kasai
- Music by: Hiroyuki Nagatsuta
- Production company: Image Rings
- Release date: August 23, 2010 (Japan)
- Running time: 114 minutes
- Country: Japan
- Language: Japanese

Bachiatari Bōryoku Ningen (Japanese: バチアタリ暴力人間; lit. Cursed Violent People) is a 2010 Japanese "found footage" black comedy film directed by Kōji Shiraishi and Akihiro Kasai.

== Plot ==
Following a shoot gone wrong, director Koji Shiraishi finds himself forced to employ two violent criminals in his future productions.

== Cast ==
- Takeshi Yamamoto
- Akihiro Kasai
- Tsugumi Nagasawa
- Shigeo Ōsako
- Kōji Shiraishi
- Yumi Yoshiyuki

== Production ==
The film is a remake of one of Shiraishi's earlier works.

== See also ==
- The Curse (2005), another "found footage" mockumentary by the same director
- Occult (2009), another "found footage" mockumentary by the same director
- Shirome (2010), another "found footage" mockumentary from the same director
- Chō Akunin (2011), another "found footage" mockumentary from the same director
