= Teketeke (film) =

- Theatrical release poster
- Directed by: Kōji Shiraishi
- Written by: Takeki Akimoto
- Starring: Yuko Oshima; Mami Yamasaki; Mai Nishida
- Cinematography: Shuji Momose
- Music by: Mari Shimizu
- Production company: Tsuburaya Productions
- Distributed by: Art Port; Metro-Goldwyn-Mayer
- Release date: March 21, 2009 (Japan)
- Running time: 70 minutes
- Country: Japan
- Language: Japanese

Teketeke (Japanese: テケテケ) is a 2009 Japanese supernatural horror film directed by Kōji Shiraishi and written by Takeki Akimoto. Based on the Japanese urban legend known as Teke Teke, which concerns the vengeful ghost of a schoolgirl whose body was cut in half by a train, the film stars Yuko Oshima, Mami Yamasaki, and Mai Nishida. It was followed by a sequel, Teketeke 2, which was released the same year.

== Plot ==
In Nagoya, an office worker named Hiromi Shimizu walks home at night, taking a path along an overpass near a train station. She feels a sudden wind, hears a scuttling sound and is chased by an unseen fast-moving entity. She manages to hide from the threat and overhears children in a nearby building arguing over the specifics of an urban legend. As she steps onto the road, the wind picks up again, and the entity slices her in half at the waist.

Sometime later, schoolgirl Kana Ohashi is asked by her best friend and classmate, Ayaka Sekiguchi, to ask soccer player Utsumi Keita out for her. Kana obliges, and Utsumi agrees to go on a date with Ayaka. The next day, Utsumi shows Kana and Ayaka a news report on his cell phone about the mysterious death in Nagoya. Utsumi recalls a story he heard in elementary school about Teke Teke, a ghost with no lower extremities. When individuals walk on the overpass at night, it is said that Teke Teke will chase after them (making a "teke teke" noise as she moves along the ground) and that if they look back, she will cut them in half.

As Utsumi rides away on his bicycle, Kana and Ayaka walk back to their homes together. Ayaka, upset that Utsumi seems to like Kana more than her, angrily takes a different route home. Reaching the overpass, Ayaka sees Teke Teke and trips after trying to run away from her. Teke Teke cuts Ayaka in half and disappears along the train tracks into the night. After school, Kana learns that Hiromi's boyfriend was arrested by police for her murder. He has denied any involvement in her death and told the authorities that he saw a woman with no lower half.

The next night, Kana places a bouquet at the site of Ayaka's death. She hears Ayaka call her name and turns to see Teke Teke, who begins to chase her. Kana runs into Utsumi, who helps her escape on his bicycle. Kana conducts research about Teke Teke at a library, where she sees her cousin Rie Hirayama. Rie informs Kana that anyone who encounters Teke Teke and survives is said to die three days later.

The girls visit a scholar in Kakogawa, who tells them of a woman who committed suicide in 1948 by jumping off of an overpass in Mikasa-cho. The scholar's assistant, Takeda, leads them to the daughter of a landlord who lived in that area. She tells Kana, Rie and Takeda that the woman who killed herself was a nurse named Reiko Kashima, who had been raped by an American soldier. Traumatized, Kashima associated the color red with the bleeding she experienced during the incident and discarded all red objects in her sight as a result.

Afterward, Takeda informs Kana and Rie of rumors he heard in middle school, which told of a memorial built for Kashima in Mikasa-cho, which has since fallen over. Rie, who reveals that she also encountered Teke Teke not long after Kana did, drives to Mikasa-cho by nightfall with the help of directions given by Takeda. There, Kana and Rie discover the fallen memorial in a forested area. They lift the memorial back into its original position, and after returning to Rie's red car, Kana and Rie notice Teke Teke behind them in the road. They soon abandon the vehicle, removing red clothes and accessories from themselves as they run away. Rie accidentally cuts her head on a branch, causing her to bleed. Teke Teke jumps at Rie, slicing her in two, and appears to rush towards Kana. Sometime later, a group of children walks and discusses rumors about Kashima and Teke Teke runs behind them.

In a mid-credits scene taking place one year later, Takeda visits Kana and her mother, who are living at a new residence. Kana, who has been in an almost catatonic state since Rie's death, is offered a red box of sweets by Takeda, which causes her to go into hysterics.

== Cast ==
- Yuko Oshima as Kana Ohashi
- Mami Yamasaki as Rie Hirayama
- Mai Nishida as Ayaka Sekiguchi
- Ikkei Yamamoto (credited as "Ikkei") as Utsumi Keita
- Kaoru Mizuki as Kana's mother
- Michiko Sawayanagi
- Shinmei Tsuji
- Shinnosuke Abe as Takeda
- Kanako Kojima as Hiromi Shimizu
- Yôko Chôsokabe as Teke-Teke

== Release ==
The film premiered at Kineca Omori, Shinagawa, Tokyo, on 21 March 2009, and was screened alongside its sequel, Teketeke 2. Mami Yamasaki and Mai Nishida, along with Teketeke 2 cast members Sayuri Iwata and Hatsune Matsushima, attended the premiere.

== Critical reception ==
Teketeke received mixed reviews. Chris Fox of Wicked Horror called the film "a textbook-example of low-budget genre filmmaking done right". Adam Symchuk of Asian Movie Pulse wrote that "beyond the phenomenal creature design the film remains a rather generic telling of a popular urban legend with a plot and performances that are just passable". Niina Doherty of HorrorNews.net criticized the film's pacing, the "somewhat clichéd characters", and the execution of the Teke Teke ghost, and wrote that "It's not that Teketeke is a terrible film, it's just incredibly mediocre". Andrew Mack of Screen Anarchy wrote that the film "was neither suspenseful nor scary and I also wish it was a whole lot gorier than it was".
