= Shirome (film) =

2010 film by Kōji Shiraishi

- DVD cover
- Directed by: Kōji Shiraishi
- Written by: Kōji Shiraishi
- Produced by: Nobutaka Katō
- Starring: Kanako Momota; Ayaka Sasaki; Akari Hayami; Shiori Tamai; Momoka Ariyasu; Reni Takagi
- Cinematography: Kazuhiro Mimura
- Edited by: Kōji Shiraishi; Erika Takatsuka
- Production companies: Shirome Project Partners; Stardust Promotion
- Distributed by: Stardust Pictures
- Release date: August 13, 2010 (Japan)
- Running time: 83 minutes
- Country: Japan
- Language: Japanese

Shirome (Japanese: シロメ; lit. White Eyes) is a 2010 Japanese mockumentary horror film written and directed by Kōji Shiraishi. It is presented in a found footage style, and concerns a school which is haunted by a wish-granting spirit. Shiraishi appears in a starring role in the film, playing himself, as do the six then-members of the Japanese idol group Momoiro Clover Z.

== Plot ==
Director Kōji Shiraishi wants to film an episode for a Japanese television program, featuring members of the "Idol"-genre singing and dancing ensemble, Momoiro Clover Z (referred to in the film by their previous name, simply Momoiro Clover). The program is one wherein minor celebrity guests are employed to investigate haunted houses and similarly mysterious locales, in an attempt to determine the truth about such places, and their associated paranormal phenomena. The members of Momoiro Clover are asked to visit an abandoned school, where a shrine to a minor kami known as "Shirome" is located. This shrine takes the form of a painting that is thought to be that of a butterfly, but which may represent the entity's face.

According to local legends, if Shirome is asked to grant a wish, he will do so, but only if the person asking is completely sincere in both their request and their belief in the existence and power of the Shirome entity. If any wish is asked of this being in a frivolous manner or with a spirit of unbelief, Shirome will destroy that person, either through causing them to have a fatal accident, inducing them to commit suicide, or driving them hopelessly insane.

The girls decide to visit the shrine and request Shirome that they be granted a chance to appear on a nationwide Japanese television broadcast. As soon as this wish is pronounced, a series of chaotic disturbances ensue, and a hulking, large, white-eyed being is briefly seen standing (or floating) next to the girls. Subsequently, their entertainment career becomes characterized by a high degree of popularity and commercial success, but a disturbing video clip taken immediately after one of their high-profile concerts suggests that their success may have been obtained in an ill-advised manner and that the young ladies face the possibility of very fearsome, dire consequences in the future, perhaps including the loss of their souls.

== See also ==
- Bachiatari Bōryoku Ningen
- Chō Akunin
- Noroi: The Curse
- Occult (film)
