= Chō Akunin =

- Film poster
- Directed by: Kōji Shiraishi
- Written by: Kōji Shiraishi
- Produced by: Mika Horikawa; Hideki Onuki; Kunihiro Okuno
- Starring: Yaeko Kiyose; Chika Kuboyama; Shijimi
- Cinematography: Kōichi Furuya
- Edited by: Ayumi Miyazaki
- Release date: May 14, 2011 (Japan)
- Running time: 90 minutes
- Country: Japan
- Language: Japanese

Chō Akunin (Japanese: 超・悪人; lit. Hyper Villain), also known as Villain, is a 2011 "found footage" film directed by Kōji Shiraishi.

== Plot ==
A criminal gossip magazine receives a video tape from Japan's most notorious criminal rapist, the "Hyper Villain" Shouhei Eno. On the tape, Eno reveals himself and proclaims he has raped 107 girls in 10 years. He also offers the magazine a chance to interview him and film his upcoming 108th rape.

== Cast ==
- Eri Aoki as Maid
- Hiroaki Kawatsure as Bartender
- Yaeko Kiyose as Yakeo Kurose
- Chika Kuboyama as Humiliated Maid
- Kazuya Makino as Guest
- Shijimi as Miwa
- Kôji Shiraishi as Cojee Shiraishi
- Mayumi Takahashi as Mayumi Tsukahashi
- Shôhei Uno as Shohei Eno/Hyper Villain

== See also ==
- The Curse (2005), another "found footage" mockumentary by the same director.
- Occult (2009), another "found footage" mockumentary by the same director.
- Shirome (2010), another "found footage" mockumentary from the same director.
- Bachiatari bouryuku ningen (2011), another "found footage" mockumentary from the same director.
