= A Record of Sweet Murder =

- Japanese film poster
- Directed by: Kōji Shiraishi
- Written by: Kōji Shiraishi
- Produced by: Yoshi Kino; Choir Yu-ri
- Starring: Yeon Je-wook; Kim Kkot-bi; Tsukasa Aoi; Ryotaro Yonemura
- Cinematography: Kōji Shiraishi; Sun Sang-jae
- Edited by: Kim Mun-pyo
- Release dates: September 6, 2014 (Japan); September 11, 2014 (South Korea)
- Running time: 86 minutes
- Countries: Japan; South Korea

A Record of Sweet Murder (Japanese: ある優しき殺人者の記録) is a 2014 Japanese-South Korean thriller film directed by Kōji Shiraishi. It was released on 6 September 2014 in Japan, and 11 September 2014 in South Korea.

== Plot ==
Kim So-yeon is a South Korean reporter who is contacted by Park Sang-joon, an old childhood friend, who has recently escaped from the mental institution he has been in since age 10 and gone on a serial killing spree. Sang-joon asks So-yeon to bring along a Japanese cameraman (Tashiro), and after the two arrive at the rendezvous spot in Seoul, Sang-joon calls to tell them to enter an abandoned apartment complex. After entering the building, Sang-joon appears and forces the pair at knife-point into an apartment, telling the cameraman to never stop recording on the threat of death. So-yeon begins questioning Sang-joon about his reasons for the killings. Sang-joon shows So-yeon a video he took of the accident that led to his institutionalisation, which was their shared friend Yoon-jin being hit by a car. He explains that ever since the accident, a god has been telling him to kill 27 people at age 27 in a ritual that will bring back Yoon-jin and the 27 people. He asks So-yeon and the reporter to document the final two murders to show that the ritual is real.

Sang-joon states that his final victims need to be two people who have demonstrated true love, and reveals an injured, bleeding couple bound and gagged in an adjacent room. He tells So-yeon that he had intended to kill them, but realized they weren't his true targets after both tried to save only themselves, showing they didn't really love one another. However, upon reading a magazine taken from the male victim, Sang-joon found a coded message from the god, supposedly specifying that the final two victims will be a Japanese couple due to arrive shortly at the apartment, each of whom will have a matching mark on their neck. So-yeon tries to talk Sang-joon out of his seemingly delusional state, but after receiving a strange, garbled phone call that commands him to dispose of his captives before the true victims arrive, Sang-joon restrains So-yeon and asphyxiates the couple, claiming that it'll allow them to pass away in their sleep.

To So-yeon's shock, a pair of Japanese lovers named Ryotaro and Tsukasa arrive at the apartment at the exact time Sang-joon had predicted, having traveled to Korea for their honeymoon. Sang-joon ambushes the couple, who are revealed to be violent criminals, and Ryotaro manages to stab him in the hand with a concealed knife before being subdued. Forcing Tashiro to act as an interpreter, Sang-joon informs the two lovers of their fate, and tries to force Ryotaro to commit suicide by threatening to rape Tsukasa. Noticing Sang-joon's obvious hesitance, Ryotaro berates him and goads him into going through with the act, privately confiding in Tashiro that Tsukasa has long fantasized about being violated while he watches.

After Sang-joon ejaculates, Tsukasa bites him in the ear and grapples with him him, allowing Ryotaro to free himself. During the ensuing struggle, Sang-joon's neck is briefly exposed, revealing a distinctive marking. A standoff soon ensues, with So-yeon eventually explaining that she has an identical mark on her own neck, which first appeared shortly after Yoon-jin's death. She now believes in Sang-joon's prophecy, but states that she and he are the final victims, not the Japanese couple, who are merely meant to demonstrate their love. Aroused by the incident, Tsukasa engages in sexual intercourse with Ryotaro, fulfilling that requirement of the ritual. Though So-yeon tries to calm him down, Ryotaro brutally attacks Sang-joon, intending to kill him before he has a chance to commit suicide.

So-yeon suddenly takes Tsukasa at knifepoint, eventually slitting her throat when Ryotaro refuses to back down. The entire situation descends into chaos, with a dying Tsukasa managing to mortally wound So-yeon, while Ryotaro stabs Tashiro and is badly injured himself before being finished off by So-yeon. After Tashiro dies from his stab wound, Sang-joon takes his camera, while So-yeon pleads with him to take her out of the apartment, as she doesn't want to die in darkness.

As the pair make their way to the rooftop, So-yeon urges Sang-joon to kill her and then commit suicide before she expires from her injuries, as otherwise all the bloodshed will have been for nothing. Before a tearful Sang-joon asphyxiates her to death, So-yeon tells him that if the ritual works, she hopes that the two of them can go see a movie with Yoon-jin after their resurrection, hopefully one with a happy ending. Now alone, Sang-joon prepares to kill himself, but not before providing a closing message to the viewer, telling them that he's not insane and that his movie will serve as a record of the miracle he performed. As Sang-joon prepares to jump, a monstrous, tentacled entity (implicitly the "god" that has been communicating with him) emerges from the darkened clouds and ensnares him.

Sang-joon suddenly finds himself transported back to 1996, on the exact day of Yoon-jin's fatal accident. He finds Yoon-jin and the child versions of himself and So-yeon, and manages to get them away from the scene of the impending accident as the car approaches. Accepting his fate, Sang-joon stands in the path of the oncoming car, but realizes nobody will ever see his film right before he is struck and killed.

After briefly showing footage of the nameless entity and other, similar creatures floating in a cosmic setting, the damaged camera cuts back to 2014 during Christmastime. It is found on the street by So-yeon, Yoon-jin and an alternate version of Sang-joon, all of whom are now alive due to the accident in 1996 having been averted, which in turn prevented Sang-joon from becoming a serial killer as an adult. Yoon-jin stares into the camera and becomes emotional without realizing why, prompting Sang-joon to hug her. As the three friends head off to enjoy their evening together, So-yeon notes that it's like a movie with a happy ending. The camera is left on the ground while credits roll, before finally dying.

== Cast ==
- Yeon Je-wook as Park Sang-joon
- Kim Kkot-bi as Kim So-yeon
- Tsukasa Aoi as Tsukasa
- Ryotaro Yonemura
- Park Jeong-yoon as Go Yoon-jin
- Yeo Min-jeong
- Kōji Shiraishi as Tashiro, cameraman

== Production ==
A Record of Sweet Murder originated in early 2013 after the manager of Cinema Skhole, a cinema in Nagoya which had frequently screened Kōji Shiraishi's films, introduced the director to a South Korean producer who was seeking a Japanese filmmaker to direct a horror film. The project subsequently developed as a Japanese–South Korean co-production. The film was shot entirely in South Korea. Shiraishi visited the country while developing the screenplay, but said that because he was unfamiliar with many aspects of everyday Korean life, he deliberately concentrated the story largely within a single room. He felt this allowed the film to retain a sense of realism without depicting cultural details with which he was insufficiently familiar. Shiraishi conceived the film as a point-of-view production appearing to unfold in a single continuous take. He said that the real-time presentation was intended to maintain tension and that some members of the Korean crew initially suggested shooting the material as a more conventional narrative film. The film was not actually photographed in a single take; several long takes were joined through rapid camera movements and moments of deliberate camera shake in order to conceal edits. Shiraishi recalled that some individual takes lasted more than seven minutes. Shiraishi also appears in the film as the unseen Japanese cameraman, Tashiro. He described the production as his first major overseas filmmaking project.

== Release ==
A Record of Sweet Murder had its world premiere at the 2014 Bucheon International Fantastic Film Festival, where it screened in the World Fantastic Cinema programme. It was released theatrically in Japan on 6 September 2014, distributed by T-Joy and Nikkatsu, and in South Korea on 11 September.

== Home media ==
Nikkatsu released the film on Blu-ray and DVD in Japan on 2 May 2015. The Blu-ray edition included interviews with the cast, footage from the Japanese premiere, an audio commentary by Shiraishi and producer Yoshi Kino, and Shiraishi's 1998 short film Ano Ko wa Kumo no Ue, which similarly employed a fixed-camera, single-take filmmaking technique.

Unearthed Films released A Record of Sweet Murder on DVD in North America on 28 May 2019.

== Reception ==
Richard Kuipers of Variety described the film as a claustrophobic psychodrama whose apparent continuous-take presentation produced both dramatic strengths and weaknesses. He praised its conclusion as clever and unexpectedly affecting, while suggesting that its graphic violence and deliberately rough visual style would appeal more strongly to genre audiences than to general viewers.

Starburst similarly regarded the film as an intentionally uncomfortable viewing experience, praising its claustrophobic atmosphere and immersive single-camera presentation and describing it as thought-provoking despite its graphic violence.
