= Teke Teke =

Japanese urban legend about a legless spirit

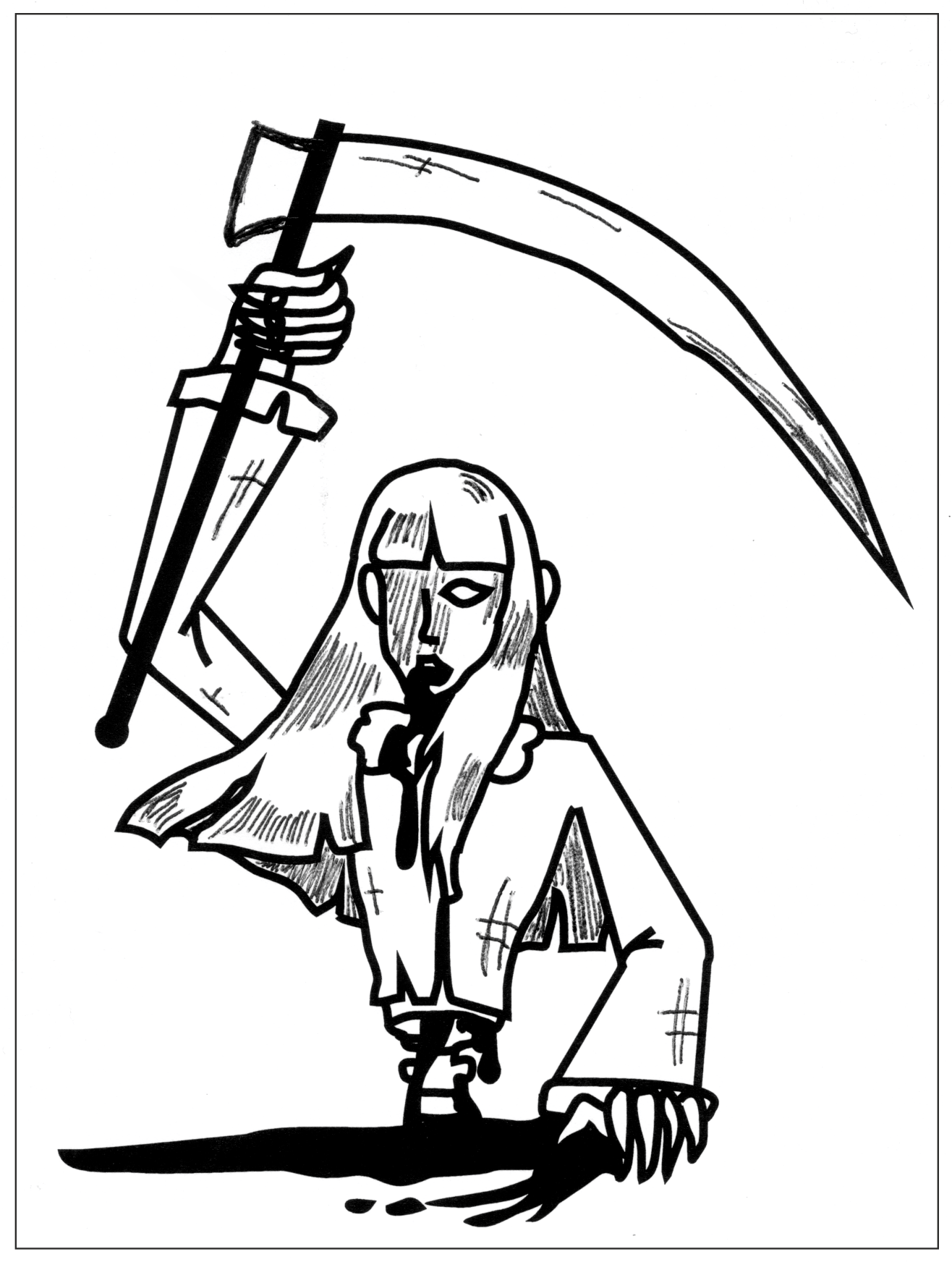
An artist's depiction of Teke Teke

Teke Teke (テケテケ), also spelled Teke-Teke, Teketeke, or Teke teke, is a Japanese urban legend about the ghost of a schoolgirl, whose body was split in half by a train after she had become stuck. She is an onryō, or a vengeful spirit, who lurks in urban areas and roams train stations at night. Since she no longer has a lower body, she travels on her hands, dragging her upper torso and making a scratching or "teke teke"-like sound, produced either by her elbows or the end of her bisected body scraping the ground. If she encounters an individual, she will chase them and slice them in half at the waist, killing them in such a way that mimics her own disfigurement.

== Legend ==
Common elements of the legend include that Teke Teke is the vengeful ghost or spirit (also known as an onryō) of a young woman or schoolgirl who fell on a railway line in Northern Japan, which resulted in her being sliced in half by a train. She survived the accident but was in agony, dying as a result of the station staff's neglect. Missing her lower extremities, she is said to walk on her hands or her elbows, making a scratching, scraping, or "teke teke"-like sound as she moves, hence the name “Teke Teke”. If an individual encounters Teke Teke at night, she will chase them and cut their body in half (often with a scythe), mimicking her own death and disfigurement out of spite.

One version of the story concerns a young woman known as Kashima Reiko. As with the original iteration of the legend, Kashima died when her legs were severed from her body by a train after she fell on the tracks. Versions of the legend often state that, when an individual learns of Kashima's story, she will appear to them within one month, and the only way to stop this from happening is to spread the story. The "Kashima Reiko" story predates that of Teke Teke, essayist Yuki Yoshida suggests that the two stories influenced each other. The legless spirit of Kashima Reiko is said to haunt bathroom stalls, asking occupants if they know where her legs are. If a questioned individual replies with an answer that Kashima does not find acceptable, she will rip or slice them in half. Individuals may survive the encounter by replying that her legs are on the Meishin Expressway, or by responding with the phrase "kamen shinin ma", or "mask death demon" (which may be the phonetic root of Kashima's name).

The children's song Satchan is sometimes associated with the urban legend in rumors and scary stories, tying the lyrics ''She really loves bananas. But she can only eat a half'' with the missing lower half of the spirit. One popular version of the story spread online says that after a young girl called Sachiko Kiritani died in a train accident similar to the one described in the story of Teke Teke, a student that found the situation funny created a new version of the song, adding a 4th verse describing the situation, later being found dead without his legs soon after.

== See also ==
- Aka Manto ("Red Cape"), a Japanese urban legend about a spirit that appears in bathrooms.
- Hanako-san, a Japanese urban legend about the spirit of a young girl who haunts school bathrooms.
- Kuchisake-onna ("Slit Mouth Woman"), a Japanese urban legend about a disfigured woman.
- Madam Koi Koi, an African urban legend of a ghost who haunts schools.
- Women in Black of Wat Samian Nari, a Thai urban legend about the spirits of two sisters in black who bear a resemblance to Teke Teke.
- Sadako Yamamura, a ghost from the Ring novels and films.
- Teketeke (film), a 2009 film based on the urban legend.
- TEKE::TEKE, a Canadian rock group.
