= Hell Girl (film) =

- Theatrical release poster
- Kanji: 地獄少女
- Revised Hepburn: Jigoku Shōjo
- Directed by: Kōji Shiraishi
- Written by: Kōji Shiraishi
- Based on: Hell Girl by Hiroshi Watanabe
- Produced by: Shoji Doyama; Tomohito Matsushita; Satomi Kotake; Masahiro Miyata
- Starring: Tina Tamashiro; Manami Hashimoto; Raiku; Akaji Maro; Nana Mori; Sawa Nimura
- Cinematography: Shinji Kumigiya
- Edited by: Seiji Harimoto
- Music by: Harumi Fuki
- Production company: W-Field
- Distributed by: GAGA Pictures; Universal Pictures
- Release date: November 15, 2019 (Japan)
- Running time: 110 minutes
- Country: Japan
- Language: Japanese

Hell Girl (Japanese: 地獄少女, Hepburn: Jigoku Shōjo) is a 2019 Japanese film adaptation of the anime series of the same name by Takahiro Omori. It was directed by Kōji Shiraishi and distributed by GAGA Pictures and Constantin Film. It was released on November 15, 2019.

== Plot ==
In 1965, a teenage girl uses the Hell Correspondence to contact Ai Enma, the Hell Girl. Ai is a mysterious figure who can send someone whom you have a grudge against to Hell at once in exchange for forfeiting your own soul to Hell once you die. The teen sends her bully to Hell but shows regret. In 2019, the same girl, now old and ill, tells her journalist son Kudo Jin her story before she dies. He publishes the story.

High schooler Ichikawa Miho attends the concert of Maki, a charismatic rising musician, where she is groped by a pervert. Another girl, Nanjo Haruka, who is obsessed with Maki, saves her and the two become close friends. They attend another concert by Mikuriya Sanae, a pop star. During the concert, a man slashes Sanae's face with a knife. Sanae becomes distraught after seeing the scars on her face. She comes across Jin's article, accesses the Hell Correspondence, and types in the name of her attacker, Nagaoka Takuro. She sees a vision of Hell, and meets Ai, who gives her a straw doll with a red thread tied around it. Once the thread is untied, Takuro will be sent to Hell, but when she dies, Sanae will also go to Hell.

Sanae meets with Jin, who advises her not to pull the thread and move on. However, pushed over the edge by a cruel letter from Takuro, Sanae pulles the thread and the doll dissolves. Takuro is dragged to Hell. His mother goes to the Mikuriya residence to beg for forgiveness. Sanae tells her that she sent her son to Hell and resumes her career with Maki as her manager. During Sanae's performance, Ai appears to take her to Hell; Takuro's mother had put her name in Hell Correspondence. Takuro's mother goes to Sanae's parents and explains the situation before committing suicide.

After Sanae's disappearance, Maki holds an audition to replace her. He chooses Haruka as the new soloist and makes her take drugs before they kiss. Maki tells Miho to stay away from Haruka since she is not pure. One day, Miho goes to Haruka's residence, wherein she sees Maki and Haruka together. After he leaves, Haruka beats her mother, then beats Miho and tells her to stay away from her. A distraught Miho believes Haruka was brainwashed by Maki. She goes to Kudo for more information; he confirms that Maki is a dangerous man and plays a voice recording wherein Maki is talking about killing Haruka during the live performance as a sacrifice to cleanse the world.

Kudo and Miho kidnap Haruka and tell her about the sacrifice. Haruka tells Maki that Kudo knows about the sacrifice without mentioning Miho. Kudo, having placed a bug in Haruka's bag, hears everything but one of Maki's henchmen knocks him out. When he wakes up, he finds himself in an abandoned building, where Maki kills him. Miho hears about Kudo's murder on the news and decides to send Maki to hell. She attends the concert and pulls the string of the doll. Enma Ai takes Maki to hell as Miho saves Haruka.

Haruka and Miho reconcile. Maki's true colors are revealed to the public, causing his album sales to drop rapidly; his men are arrested by the police thanks to Kudo's testimony before his death.

== Cast ==
- Tina Tamashiro as Ai Enma
- Manami Hashimoto as Hone Onna
- Akaji Maro as Wanyūdō
- Raiku as Ren 'Roby' Ichimoku
- Nana Mori as Miho Ichikawa
- Sawa Nimura as Haruka Nanjo
- Mina Ōba as Sanae Mikuriya
- Kazuki Namioka as Kudo
- Tom Fujita as Maki
