= Satchan =

Song

Song
- Language: Japanese
- Released: 1959
- Genre: Children's song
- Composer: Megumi Ōnaka
- Lyricist: Hiroo Sakata

"Satchan (サッちゃん, Sat-chan or Sa-chan)" is a Japanese children's song composed in 1959 and is well known there. Its lyrics were written by Hiroo Sakata (阪田寛夫, Sakata Hiroo) and the music was composed by Megumi Ōnaka (大中恩, Ōnaka Megumi).

The name Satchan is a diminutive form of the name Sachiko and is used mostly for young girls as opposed to older ones. Diminutive forms such as these can—but do not always—carry a comical connotation, so "Satchan" isn't merely a name like "Jenny;" it can be more like "Jenny girl" or "Jenny pie." Unlike in the English-speaking world, however, diminutive forms of children's names are used more often than not when referring to or speaking to children.

== History ==
According to the lyricist Hiroo Sakata, recalling his childhood, it was about a neighborhood girl nicknamed "Satchan". Ms. Sachiko Kikuta (菊田幸子, Kikuta Sachiko) was in Sakata's South Osaka Kindergarten (南大阪幼稚園, Minami-Ōsaka Yōchien) class; she eventually moved away (referenced in the song as "...going far away" in the third verse). According to Megumi Ōnaka, Sakata had his first crush on Kikuta.

The reference to the banana in the second verse was over the health episode Sakata experienced himself. When younger, Sakata's body was weak; when he tried to eat more than half of a banana, he would feel nauseous and could not finish the rest.

As a note, the lyricist and the composer were cousins.

== Popular culture ==
Due to the popularity of this children's song, several different urban legends and spoofs associated with this song have sprung up in Japan. In one version, an additional fourth verse alludes to Sat-chan being a legless ghost. In another version, additional verses up to the tenth were composed.

In the autumn of 2006, a memorial stone inscribed with the lyrics of this children's song was dedicated at the South Osaka Kindergarten.
