= Kōji Shiraishi =

Japanese film director (born 1973)

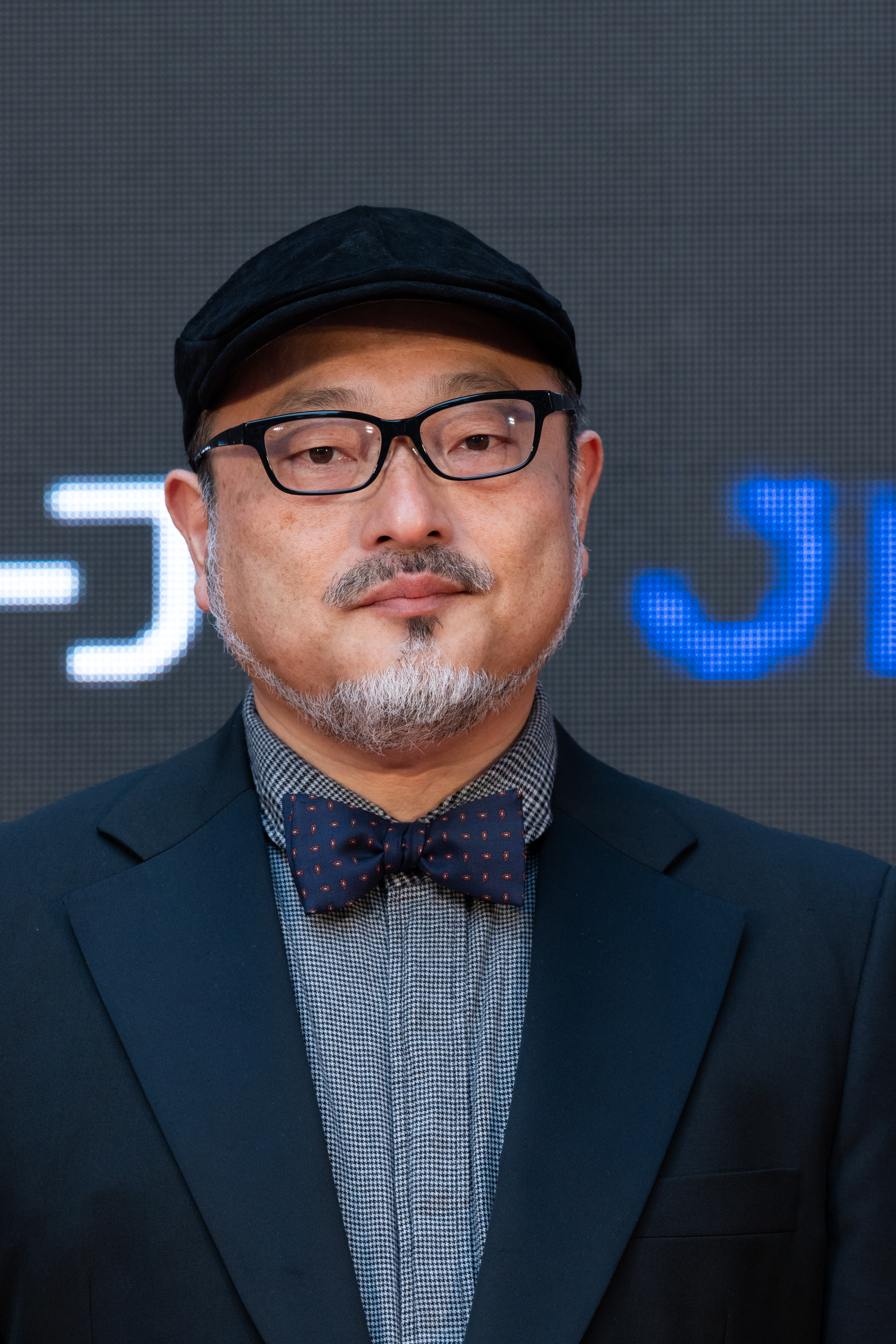
- Shiraishi in October 2024
- Born: June 1, 1973 (age 53); Fukuoka, Japan
- Occupations: Filmmaker; actor
- Years active: 1995–present

Kōji Shiraishi (白石 晃士, Shiraishi Kōji; born June 1, 1973) is a Japanese filmmaker and occasional actor. He is primarily known for directing and writing or co-writing horror films such as Noroi: The Curse (2005), Carved: The Slit-Mouthed Woman (2007), Occult (2009), Teketeke (2009), Cult (2013), and Sadako vs. Kayako (2016).

== Early life ==
Kōji Shiraishi was born in Fukuoka on June 1, 1973. He made his first short film in high school and later studied at Kyushu Sangyo University's Department of Fine Arts with the intention of pursuing a filmmaking career. Although he was expelled from the university in his second year for non-payment of tuition fees, he continued to participate in its film studies club and was involved in film production.

== Career ==
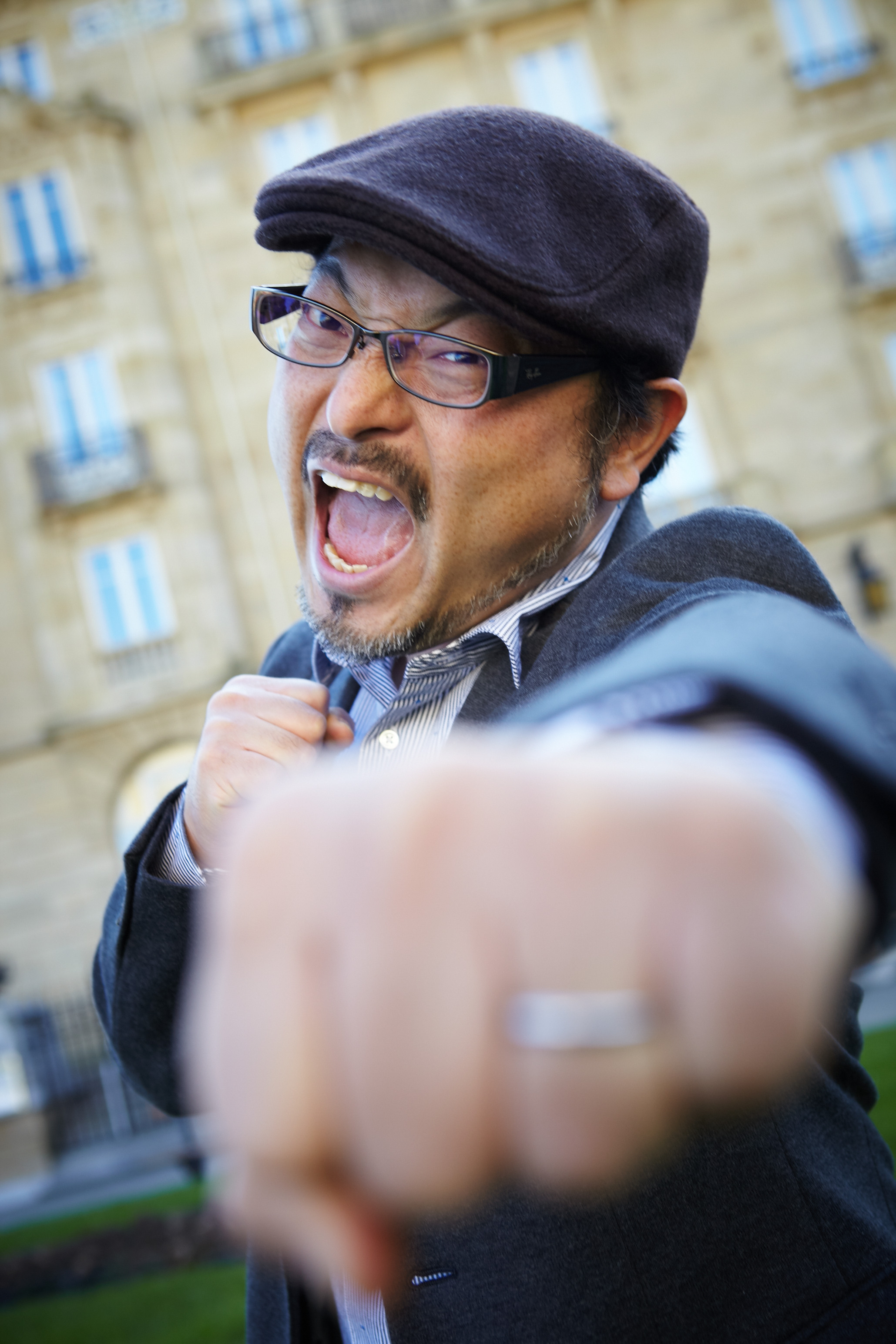
Shiraishi in November 2016

While working as a crew member on films such as Sōgo Ishii's August in the Water (1995), Shiraishi also made his own low-budget independent films: Violent Men (1997), co-directed with Akihiro Kasai, won the Screenplay Award and the Cinematography Award at the 1998 Hiroshima Film Exhibition, and The Wind Shall Blow (1998), co-directed with Futoshi Kondo, won the Runner-up Grand Prix at the 1999 Pia Film Festival.

In the early 2000s, Shiraishi became involved in the production of horror films. From 2002 to 2003, he directed several installments of the Honto ni Atta! Noroi no Video series. He made his feature-length directorial debut with Jurei the Movie: Kuro-Jurei (2004) and rose to prominence in Japan and abroad for his pseudo-documentary style, which he utilized on films such as Noroi (2005), Occult (2009), Cult (2013), A Record of Sweet Murder (2014), Welcome to the Occult Forest (2022), and Aishiteru! (2022).

In the mid-2010s, Shiraishi began directing more mainstream films such as Sadako vs. Kayako (2016), Funouhan (2018), and Hell Girl (2019). His domestic popularity was enhanced by the Senritsu Kaiki File Kowasugi! series, which began as a video project in 2012 and takes the format of a psychic documentary like Honto ni Atta! Noroi no Video. The series is said to be influenced by the works of Daijiro Morohoshi, as opposed to the stereotypical characteristics of Japanese horror. The popularity of the series, and of Shiraishi himself, has grown especially on Niconico, which periodically broadcasts the series and his other works.

In 2016, Shiraishi published the book Textbook of Fake Documentaries, which details his own methods for creating pseudo-documentaries.

== Artistry ==
Shiraishi cites Gakuryū Ishii as his favorite Japanese director, with Ishii's Crazy Thunder Road (1980) being his favorite film. He also admires directors such as John Carpenter, Brian De Palma, Abbas Kiarostami, and Sam Raimi, and has named The Texas Chain Saw Massacre (1974), Dawn of the Dead (1978), The Evil Dead (1981), The Thing (1982), and Evil Dead II (1987) as films he particularly enjoyed.

== Filmography ==
=== Film ===
- Honto ni Atta! Noroi no Video (2003)
- Honto ni Atta! Noroi no Video 2 (2003)
- Ju-Rei: The Uncanny (2004)
- Dark Tales of Japan (2004)
- Hideshi Hino's Theater of Horror (2004)
- Noroi: The Curse (2005)
- Carved: The Slit-Mouthed Woman (2007)
- Takada Wataru Teki Zero (2008)
- Grotesque (2009)
- Occult (2009)
- Teketeke (2009)
- Teketeke 2 (2009)
- Shirome (2010)
- Chō Akunin (2011)
- Cult (2013)
- Ada (2013)
- Senritsu Kaiki File Kowasugi! The Most Terrifying Movie in History (2014)
- A Record of Sweet Murder (2014)
- Murder Workshop (2014)
- Vauxhall Rideshow (2016)
- Mippei (in Kidan Hyakkei) (2016)
- Sadako vs. Kayako (2016)
- Funouhan (2018)
- Crazy Road of Love (2018)
- Hell Girl (2019)
- Zenaku No Kuzu (Cancelled)
- A Beast in Love (2020)
- Welcome to the Occult Forest (2022)
- Aishiteru! (2022)
- Senritsu Kaiki World Kowasugi! (2023)
- Never Send Me, Please (2023)
- House of Sayuri (2024)
- Kinki (2025)

=== Video ===
- Onmyoji: Juso-Gaeshi (2001)
- Onmyoji 2: Jinma-Choubuku (2001)
- Nippon Onnen Chizu: Kensho!! Sugisawa-mura no Noroi (2001)
- Nippon Onnen Chizu 2: Kensho!! Jukai no Noroi (2002)
- Kaiki! Unbelievable (2002)
- Honto ni Atta! Noroi no Video Ver.X:3 (2002)
- Honto ni Atta! Noroi no Video Ver.X:4 (2002)
- Onmyoji: Jitsuroku! Hyakki-Fumetsu (2003)
- Shudan Jisatsu Net (2003)
- Shinrei Shashin Kitan (2006)
- Uwasa no Shinso! Kuchisake Onna (2007)
- Yurei Zombie (2007)
- Ura Horror (2008)
- Paranormal Phenomenon (2010)
- Bachiatari Bōryoku Ningen (2010)
- Kami Idol Sosenkyo Battle (2011)
- Senritsu Kaiki File Kowasugi File 01: Operation Capture the Slit-Mouthed Woman (2012)
- Senritsu Kaiki File Kowasugi File 02: Shivering Ghost (2012)
- Senritsu Kaiki File Kowasugi File 03: Legend of a Human-Eating Kappa (2013)
- Senritsu Kaiki File Kowasugi File 04: The Truth! Hanako-san in the toilet (2013)
- Senritsu Kaiki File Kowasugi! Preface: True Theory, Yotsuya Kaidan, the Curse of Oiwa (2014)
- Senritsu Kaiki File Kowasugi!: Final Chapter (2015)
- Senritsu Kaiki File Cho-Kowasugi! Fear Adventure: Kokkuri-san (2015)
- Senritsu Kaiki File Cho-Kowasugi! Dark Mystery: Snake Woman (2015)

=== Television ===
- Oonamakubi in Nippon no Kowai Yoru (TBS, 2004)
- Jintai Mokei, Haikou no Satsuei, Kemono, and Kokkuri-san in Gakkou no Kaidan (BeeTV, 2012)
- Zekkyo Taikan Kimodameshi (d Video, 2014)
- Museum -Preface- (GYAO! / WOWOW, 2016)
- Welcome to the Occult Forest (WOWOW, 2022)

=== Web ===
- Mirai Seiki SHIBUYA (Hulu, 2021)
