= Tsukasa Aoi =

Retired Japanese gravure idol, AV idol, and actress

- 葵 つかさ
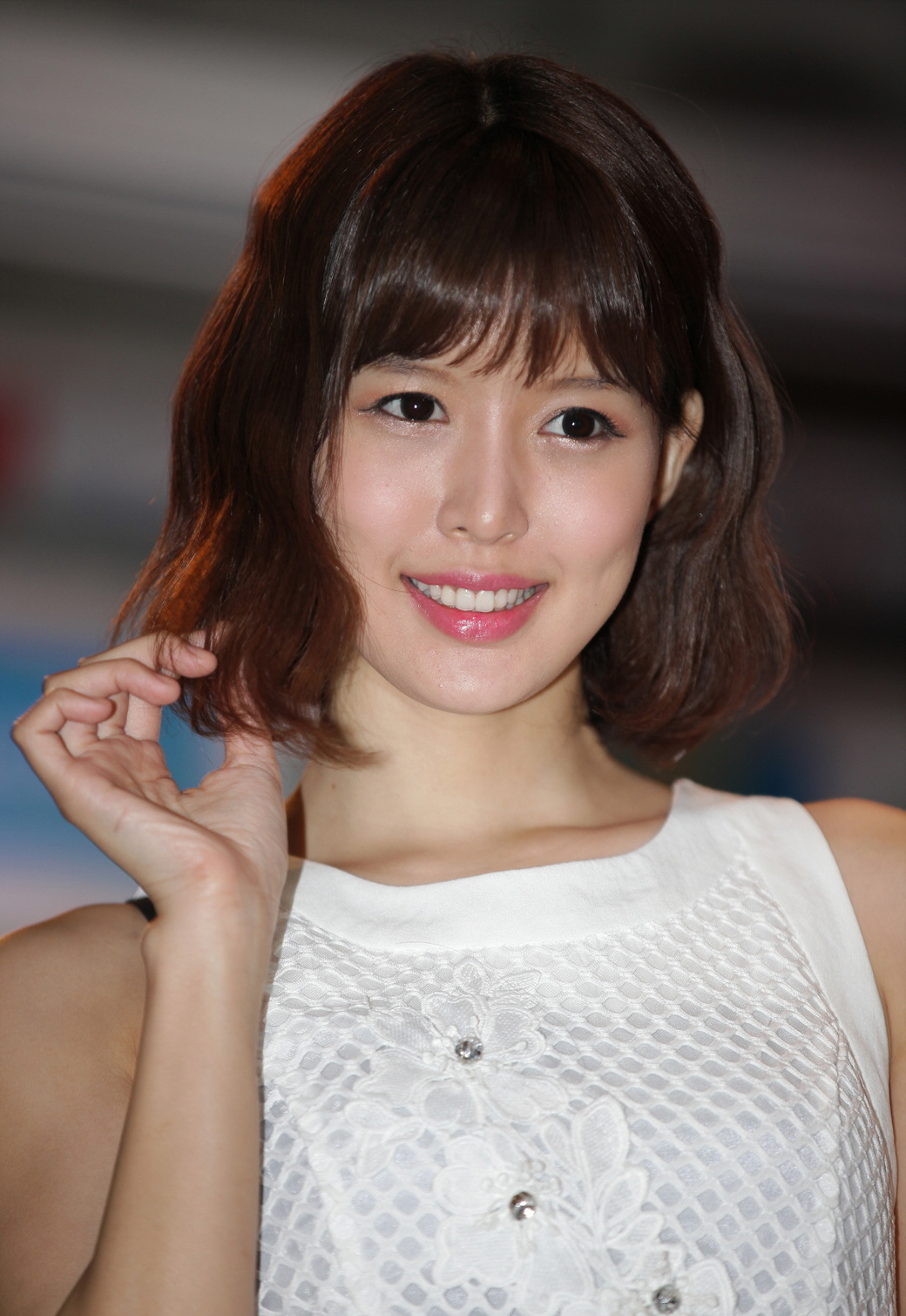
- Aoi in 2016
- Born: 14 August 1990 (age 36); Osaka, Japan
- Occupations: Pornographic actress; gravure model; actress
- Years active: 2008–2025

Signature
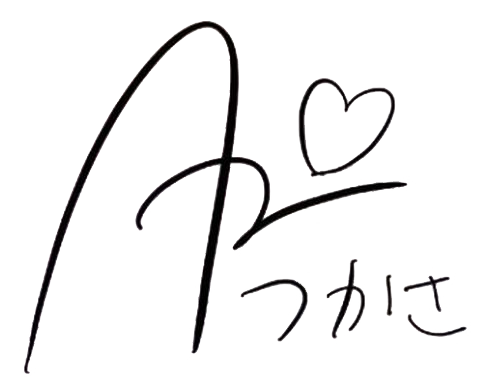

Tsukasa Aoi (Japanese: 葵 つかさ, Hepburn: Tsukasa Aoi; born August 14, 1990) is a Japanese former gravure idol, actress, television personality, AV idol, and idol singer. Aoi starred in over 700 adult films since beginning her career in 2010. Once a leading actress for the AV studio Alice Japan, Aoi eventually became an exclusive performer for S1 No. 1 Style. She was a member of the idol group Ebisu Muscats from 2015 to 2018.

== Life and career ==
Born in Osaka, Aoi debuted as a uniform gravure model in the October 2008 issue of Bejeanmagazine. In June 2009, she was cast as a regular in the Sun Television variety show Gung Gung Bone!, which was cancelled shortly afterward.

The same year, she made regular appearances on the San-TV talk show Onagokoro and was featured in the segment "Tsukasa Aoi's Aim for the Top" in the Television Osaka variety show Idol Sniper 2. In December 2009, she starred in Aoi Shōjo, her first gravure video, and a second gravure video was released in August 2010.

In August 2010, Aoi appeared nude for the first time in a photo set published by Bejean; in September, her debut into the adult industry was announced Her AV debut film, Absolute Girl Aoi Tsukasa, was released by Alice Japan on October 8, 2010.

In February 2011, she appeared on the cover of the magazine Saizo, becoming the first active AV actress to be chosen as cover girl.

In February 2012, she won the FLASH Award at the Adult Broadcasting Awards. The same year, she performed her first leading role in a mainstream film, starring in Ken'ichi Fujiwara's prison drama Female Prisoner No. 701 – Sasori, a remake of Shunya Itō's Female Convict 701: Scorpion (1972).

In 2013, she guest starred an episode of the TVBS comedy series True Love 365, becoming the first adult actress to appear in a Taiwanese dorama. In March 2014, Aoi featured as a Sailor Moon AV model in the film Naked Ambition 2. In September 2014, she starred in the film A Record Of Sweet Murder.

On September 26, 2015, she was announced as a second generation member of the Ebisu Muscats. She graduated from the group in June 2018.

In 2015, she transferred from Alice Japan to S1 No. 1 Style. Her last film with Alice Japan, Final Continuous Climatic Cumming Tsukasa Aoi, directed by Yuji Sakamoto, was released on May 22, 2015.

In 2016, she received the Special Presenter Award from the DMM Adult Awards.

In 2019 she was nominated for the Best Actress Award at the 2019 Fanza Adult Awards. In the same year, rumors were published that Aoi was romantically involved with Arashi's popular boy band singer, Jun Matsumoto.

On July 20, 2025, she announced on her Instagram that she would retire on August 17.
