= Cult (2013 film) =

2013 Japanese found footage supernatural horror film

- Poster
- Directed by: Kōji Shiraishi
- Written by: Kōji Shiraishi
- Produced by: Takashige Ichise
- Starring: Yaeko Kiyose; Ryosuke Miura; Mari Iriki; Yu Abiru; Mayuko Iwasa
- Cinematography: Toru Hirao
- Music by: Kuniaki Haishima
- Production companies: W Field; Next Animation Studio; Oz Company
- Release dates: April 4, 2013 (Brussels International Fantastic Film Festival); July 20, 2013 (Japan)
- Running time: 84 minutes
- Country: Japan
- Language: Japanese

Cult (Japanese: カルト, Hepburn: Karuto) is a 2013 Japanese horror found footage film written and directed by Kōji Shiraishi about several actresses who play themselves as they appear on a paranormal television show to investigate the supernatural malevolent forces that are haunting the Kaneda family. It was released in Japan on July 20, 2013.

== Plot ==
Tomoe Kaneda, a housewife, and her 15-year-old daughter Miho encounter paranormal activity in their new home that's caught on camera, prompting a paranormal TV show to send actresses Yu Abiru, Mayuko Iwasa, and Mari Iriki, along with Buddhist priest Unsui, to investigate the matter.

The priest explains that there is impure energy around the house and attempts a series of purification rituals, only for strange incidents to occur. When Unsui attempts an exorcism on the entire house to replenish an evil spirit, Miho accidentally enters a trance and kills her family's dog.

The following week, the three actresses and Unsui return to the house accompanied by Unsui's superior, Ryugen. Ryugen performs a ritual and discovers that Miho is possessed by an evil spirit. Mari suddenly exhibits extreme distress at the situation and decides to quit the show. During the exorcism, Unsui falls victim to the spirit's attack before Ryugen can banish it. Unsui soon perishes in the hospital, while Ryugen shortly afterward is attacked and ultimately killed by the spirit.

A new freelance exorcist, going by the nickname Neo, joins the group and discovers that the neighbors have intentionally cursed the house. Meanwhile, Mari is scolded by her boss for leaving her job, only for her to use telekinesis to crush him with his desk while explaining that her god is coming. On the following night, when Neo and his crew return to the house to confront the neighbors, it is revealed that Tomoe is not Miho's actual mother but a member of a spiritual cult that had abducted Miho. The cult believes that Miho is the perfect conduit for their god to enter the human world.

Neo attempts to exorcize the spirit that has possessed Miho, causing him to be exhausted and overwhelmed. While Tomoe escapes amid the chaos, Neo removes the spirit from Miho's body, only for everyone remaining in the house is confronted by an apparition of Mari, who informs them all that the cult's god will arrive to bring about the end of humanity. Neo dispels the apparition, stating that "a real battle has just begun."

== Cast ==
- Yu Abiru as herself
- Mayuko Iwasa as herself
- Mari Iriki as herself
- Natsumi Okamoto as herself
- Mari Hayashida as Yoko Taniguchi, program director
- Hajime Inoue as Ryugen
- Shigehiro Yamaguchi as Unsui
- Sayuri Oyamada as Tomoe Kaneda
- Ryosuke Miura as NEO

== Production ==
The film was released in Japan on July 20, 2013. The UK premiere took place on October 31, 2013.
