= Honto ni Atta! Noroi no Video =

1999 film directed by Hiroki Fujimoto

- DVD cover of Volume 100.
- ほんとにあった! 呪いのビデオ
- Directed by: Yoshinobu Mino
- Produced by: Shu Iwamura; Akira Harie; Honto ni Atta! Noroi no Video Production Committee
- Narrated by: Yoshihiro Nakamura
- Music by: Bon
- Production companies: Pal Entertainments Group/Copyrights Factory; NSW (Nippon Sky Way)
- Distributed by: Broadway Co., Ltd.
- Running time: 60–120 minutes
- Country: Japan
- Language: Japanese

Honto ni Atta! Noroi no Video (Japanese: ほんとにあった! 呪いのビデオ, Hepburn: Honto ni atta! Noroi no bideo; lit. "They Really Happened! Cursed Videos") is a Japanese documentary-style horror movie series produced by NSW (Nippon Sky Way) and Pal Entertainments Group and published by Broadway Co., Ltd. in Japan. In summary, an investigation team goes on a search to research "cursed" ghost videos from different people across Japan who have claimed to have tragic incidents involving these videos.

They showed raw footage of the Inokashira Park dismemberment incident and other weird and strange incidents. This series is even aired every Friday night on Family Gekijo.

== Work flow ==
Since the releases of Ring-hen and Special 5, before the start of each installment, a disclaimer calls attention to viewers.

Japanese characters	English translation
おことわり	DISCLAIMER
本作品は、投稿された映像をそのままの	Please note that this work presents
状態で紹介しているため、画像の乱れや	submitted footage in its original state,
ノイズなどが生じる場合がありますが、	so there may be some image distortion
あらかじめご了承ください。	or noise.
これからご覧いただくのは、一般投稿者	What you are about to watch is footage
より投稿していただいた映像です。	submitted by general contributors.
ご覧いただいた後、不可解な出来事や	If any mysterious events or spiritual
霊的現象が起きた場合、	phenomena occur after viewing this work,
こちらでは一切の責任を負いかねます。	we cannot take any responsibility.
本作品はお祓いを済ませております。	This work has been purified.

Then the first submitted video is shown and the main title is displayed thereafter.

== Series list ==
=== 1999 ===
Title	Staff	Release Date(s)	Running Time
Honto ni Atta! Noroi no Video	Executive Producers: Hajime Harie, Wataru Suzuki; Producers: Natsuko Kitani, Takafumi Ohashi; Creators: Yoshihiro Nakamura, Kenichi Suzuki; Staff: Tomoo Fukatsu, Madoka Watanabe, Kenji Osaku, Hisashi Imai, Nao Kanbayashi; Music: TOMZUIN H (as "Tomohiro Harada"); Narrator: Masaki Takahashi	August 22, 1999 (VHS); August 22, 2003 (DVD)	50 min.
Honto ni Atta! Noroi no Video 2	Executive Producers: Hajime Harie, Wataru Suzuki; Producers: Natsuko Kitani, Takafumi Ohashi; Creators: Yoshihiro Nakamura, Kenichi Suzuki; Staff: Kenji Osaku, Madoka Watanabe, Tomoo Fukatsu, Nao Kanbayashi; Music: TOMZUIN H (as "Tomohiro Harada"); Narrator: Masaki Takahashi	October 22, 1999 (VHS); August 22, 2003 (DVD)	54 min.
Honto ni Atta! Noroi no Video 3	Executive Producers: Hajime Harie, Wataru Suzuki; Producers: Natsuko Kitani, Takafumi Ohashi; Creators: Yoshihiro Nakamura, Kenichi Suzuki; Staff: Kenji Osaku, Madoka Watanabe, Hisashi Imai; Titles: Nao Kanbayashi; Music: TOMZUIN H (as "Tomohiro Harada"); Narrator: Yoshihiro Nakamura	December 22, 1999 (VHS); September 26, 2003 (DVD)	53 min.

=== 2000 ===
Title	Staff	Release Date(s)	Running Time
Honto ni Atta! Noroi no Video 4	Executive Producers: Hajime Harie, Wataru Suzuki; Producers: Natsuko Kitani, Takafumi Ohashi; Creators: Yoshihiro Nakamura, Kenichi Suzuki; Staff: Kenji Osaku, Madoka Watanabe, Hisashi Imai, Nao Kanbayashi; Music: TOMZUIN H (as "Tomohiro Harada"); Narrator: Yoshihiro Nakamura	April 22, 2000 (VHS); September 26, 2003 (DVD)	49 min.
Honto ni Atta! Noroi no Video 5	Executive Producers: Hajime Harie, Wataru Suzuki; Producers: Natsuko Kitani, Takafumi Ohashi; Creators: Yoshihiro Nakamura, Kenichi Suzuki; Staff: Kenji Osaku, Madoka Watanabe, Hisashi Imai, Ayako Iguchi, Satoshi Daikichi, Nao Kanbayashi; Music: TOMZUIN H (as "Tomohiro Harada"); Narrator: Yoshihiro Nakamura	June 22, 2000 (VHS); October 24, 2003 (DVD)	50 min.
Honto ni Atta! Noroi no Video Special	Executive Producers: Hajime Harie, Wataru Suzuki; Producers: Natsuko Kitani, Takafumi Ohashi; Creators: Yoshihiro Nakamura, Kenichi Suzuki; Staff: Ayako Iguchi, Satoshi Daikichi, Madoka Watanabe, Kenji Osaku, Toshiyuki Waki, Nao Kanbayashi; Music: TOMZUIN H (as "Tomohiro Harada")	August 22, 2000 (VHS); February 6, 2004 (DVD)	88 min.
Hontoni Atta! Noroino Video 6	Executive Producers: Hajime Harie, Wataru Suzuki; Producers: Natsuko Kitani, Takafumi Ohashi; Creators: Yoshihiro Nakamura, Kenichi Suzuki; Staff: Satoshi Daikichi, Madoka Watanabe; Equipment: Kenji Osaku; Music: TOMZUIN H (as "Tomohiro Harada"); Narrator: Yoshihiro Nakamura	October 22, 2000 (VHS); October 24, 2003 (DVD)	52 min.
Honto ni Atta! Noroi no Video: Jukai Special	Executive Producers: Hajime Harie, Wataru Suzuki; Producers: Natsuko Kitani, Takafumi Ohashi; Cast: Akira Kobayashi, Manabu Umemoto, Airi Matsumoto, Seiko Tokoro, Naomi Hikosaka; Director: Tonshu Takeshima; Assistant Directors: Zenji Nakagawa, Morihiro Tsuchida; Screenplay: Kenta Yukawa, Noboru Miyashita; Director of Photography: Katsuma Takagi; Lighting: Morihiro Tsuchida; Effects Editor: Takeshi Kawarazuka; Music: Takuma Saiki; Narrator: Junnosuke Watanabe	December 22, 2000 (VHS)	85 min.

=== 2001 ===
Title	Staff	Release Date(s)	Running Time
Honto ni Atta! Noroi no Video 7	Executive Producers: Hajime Harie, Wataru Suzuki; Producers: Natsuko Kitani, Takafumi Ohashi; Creators: Yoshihiro Nakamura, Kenichi Suzuki; Staff: Kenji Osaku, Madoka Watanabe; Music: TOMZUIN H (as "Tomohiro Harada"); Narrator: Yoshihiro Nakamura	March 23, 2001 (VHS); November 21, 2003 (DVD)	50 min.
Honto ni Atta! Noroi no Video Ver. X	Executive Producers: Hajime Harie, Wataru Suzuki; Producers: Natsuko Kitani, Takafumi Ohashi; Creator: Yujiro Kokonoe; Staff: Naoya Sasaki, Naoko Shimizu, Keiji Kikutake, Kenta Yukawa; Music: Kenji Saito; Narrator: Yujiro Kokonoe (uncredited)	May 25, 2001 (VHS); March 5, 2004 (DVD)	86 min.
Honto ni Atta! Noroi no Video Ver. X: 2	Executive Producers: Hajime Harie, Wataru Suzuki; Producers: Natsuko Kitani, Takafumi Ohashi; Creators: Yujiro Kokonoe, Kenta Yukawa; Staff: Naoya Sasaki, Naoko Shimizu, Keiji Kikutake, Naoya Inaba, Futoshi Okamoto; Music: Kenji Saito; Narrator: Masaki Takahashi (uncredited)	July 27, 2001 (VHS); March 5, 2004 (DVD)	88 min.
Honto ni Atta! Noroi no Video 8	Executive Producers: Hajime Harie, Wataru Suzuki; Producers: Natsuko Kitani, Takafumi Ohashi; Creator/Director: Tetsuaki Matsue; Camera/Editor: Kazuyuki Sakamoto; Supervisor/Narrator: Yoshihiro Nakamura; Sound Effects: Kan Manabe; Assistant Directors: Mamiko Hiwatashi, Kayoko Nakanishi; Music: Michinori Toyota (Paradise Garage)	September 21, 2001 (VHS); November 21, 2003 (DVD)	50 min.
Honto ni Atta! Noroi no Video Special 2	Executive Producers: Hajime Harie, Wataru Suzuki; Producers: Natsuko Kitani, Takafumi Ohashi; Creator/Director: Tetsuaki Matsue; Camera/Editor: Kazuyuki Sakamoto; Supervisor/Narrator: Yoshihiro Nakamura; Assistant Directors: Mamiko Hiwatashi, Kayoko Nakanishi; Assistant Editor: Toshiro Watanabe; Sound Effects: Kan Manabe; Music: Michinori Toyota (Paradise Garage)	December 21, 2001 (VHS); April 2, 2004 (DVD)	86 min.

=== 2002 ===
Title	Staff	Release Date(s)	Running Time
Honto ni Atta! Noroi no Video 9	Executive Producers: Hajime Harie, Wataru Suzuki; Producers: Natsuko Kitani, Takafumi Ohashi; Creator/Director: Tetsuaki Matsue; Camera/Editor: Kazuyuki Sakamoto; Supervisor/Narrator: Yoshihiro Nakamura; Assistant Directors: Mamiko Hiwatashi, Kayoko Nakanishi; Assistant Editor: Toshiro Watanabe; Sound Effects: Kan Manabe; Music: Michinori Toyota (Paradise Garage)	February 22, 2002 (VHS); December 26, 2003 (DVD)	55 min.
Honto ni Atta! Noroi no Video 10	Executive Producers: Hajime Harie, Wataru Suzuki; Producers: Natsuko Kitani, Takafumi Ohashi; Creator/Director: Tetsuaki Matsue; Camera/Editor: Kazuyuki Sakamoto; Assistant Editor: Satoko Yamamoto; Production Assistant: Toshiro Watanabe; Supervisor/Narrator: Yoshihiro Nakamura; Sound Effects: Kan Manabe; Music: Michinori Toyota (Paradise Garage)	May 24, 2002 (VHS); December 26, 2003 (DVD)	55 min.
Honto ni Atta! Noroi no Video Ver. X: 3	Executive Producers: Hajime Harie, Wataru Suzuki; Producers: Natsuko Kitani, Takafumi Ohashi; Music: DRA Music Factory (as "D.R.A"); Narrator: Hiroshi Miyagawa; Co-Editors: Tetsuo Shinji, Masatoshi Kita; Production: Ryo Murata; Assistant Director: Mineo Kikuchi; Director: Koji Shiraishi	July 26, 2002 (VHS); April 2, 2004 (DVD)	84 min.
Honto ni Atta! Noroi no Video Ver. X: 4	Executive Producers: Hajime Harie, Wataru Suzuki; Producers: Natsuko Kitani, Takafumi Ohashi; Creator: Futoshi Kondo; Assistant Directors: Shinobu Kuribayashi, Tomohiko Nakayama, Shuichi Isoda; Opening: Tetsuo Shinji; Opening Theme: Tomoyuki Takakura; Music: DRA Music Factory (as "D.R.A"); Narrator: Koji Shiraishi (uncredited); Editing/Multi-Audio: KSK Studio; Co-Editor: Masatoshi Kita; Director: Koji Shiraishi	August 23, 2002 (VHS); April 2, 2004 (DVD)	89 min.
Honto ni Atta! Noroi no Video Special 3	Executive Producers: Hajime Harie, Wataru Suzuki; Producers: Natsuko Kitani, Takafumi Ohashi; Creators/Directors: Futoshi Kondo, Kazuyuki Sakamoto; Camera: Kazuyuki Sakamoto; Assistant Directors: Mamiko Hiwatashi, Saori Kitagawa, Aiko Sumimura; Editors: Futoshi Kondo, Kazuyuki Sakamoto, Satoko Yamamoto; Sound Effects: Taishin Watanabe, Michitaka Kageyama; Narrator: Kotaro Asa (uncredited); Special Cooperation: Kyusei Mori; Supervisor: Yoshihiro Nakamura; Production: Sachiko Hanaoka	November 22, 2002 (VHS); April 2, 2004 (DVD)	87 min.

=== 2003 ===
Title	Staff	Release Date(s)	Running Time
Honto ni Atta! Noroi no Video: Ring-hen	Executive Producers: Hajime Harie, Wataru Suzuki; Producers: Natsuko Kitani, Takafumi Ohashi; Reporter: Saori Kitagawa; Creators/Directors: Futoshi Kondo, Kazuyuki Sakamoto; Camera/Editors: Futoshi Kondo, Kazuyuki Sakamoto; Assistant Director: Naoyuki Yokota; Sound Effects: Hiroshi Miyake; Supervisor/Narrator: Yoshihiro Nakamura; Reenactment Cast: Kazuhiro Karikome, Yasuyo Hirabayashi, Izumi Deguchi, Sayaka Fukusato	January 24, 2003	88 min.
Honto ni Atta! Noroi no Video: The Movie	Executive Producers: Hajime Harie, Wataru Suzuki; Producers: Natsuko Kitani, Takafumi Ohashi; Assistant Directors: Naoyuki Yokota, Tomohiro Wakasa; Music: DRA Music Factory (as "D.R.A"); Editing/Multi-Audio: NEK Studio; Co-Editor: Masatoshi Kita; Narrator: Yoshihiro Nakamura; Creator/Director: Koji Shiraishi	April 25, 2003	82 min.
Honto ni Atta! Noroi no Video 11	Executive Producers: Hajime Harie, Wataru Suzuki; Producers: Natsuko Kitani, Takafumi Ohashi; Camera/Editor: Kazuyuki Sakamoto; Assistant Directors: Naoyuki Yokota, Futoshi Kondo; Assistant Editors: Naoyuki Yokota, Futoshi Kondo, Kiyoshi Koyashiki; Production: Naoyuki Yokota; Reporters: Saori Kitagawa, Yoshiko Nishina; Narrator: Yoshihiro Nakamura; Music: Akainu; Sound Effects: scatgoto, Shinya Samejima; Editing/Multi-Audio: NEK Studio; Creator/Director: Kazuyuki Sakamoto	June 21, 2003	59 min.
Honto ni Atta! Noroi no Video Special 4	Executive Producers: Hajime Harie, Wataru Suzuki; Producers: Natsuko Kitani, Takafumi Ohashi; Camera/Editor: Kazuyuki Sakamoto; Assistant Directors: Naoyuki Yokota, Futoshi Kondo; Assistant Editors: Naoyuki Yokota, Futoshi Kondo, Kiyoshi Koyashiki; Production: Naoyuki Yokota; Reporters: Saori Kitagawa, Yoshiko Nishina; Narrator: Yoshihiro Nakamura; Music: Akainu + Taeka Umaki; Sound Effects: scatgoto, Shinya Samejima; Editing/Multi-Audio: NEK Studio; Creator/Director: Kazuyuki Sakamoto	August 22, 2003	87 min.
Honto ni Atta! Noroi no Video: The Movie 2	Executive Producers: Hajime Harie, Wataru Suzuki; Producers: Natsuko Kitani, Takafumi Ohashi; Assistant Directors: Naoyuki Yokota, Shinobu Kuribayashi, Shuichi Isoda; Cooperation: Tomohiro Wakasa; Narrator: Yoshihiro Nakamura; Music: DRA Music Factory (as "D.R.A"); Editing/Multi-Audio: NEK Studio; Creator/Director: Koji Shiraishi	November 21, 2003	88 min.

=== 2004 ===
Title	Staff	Release Date(s)	Running Time
Honto ni Atta! Noroi no Video: Senritsu Tōkō Best 20	Executive Producers: Hajime Harie, Wataru Suzuki; Producers: Natsuko Kitani, Takafumi Ohashi; Camera: Yasuhiro Isobe; Editor: Love Illusion Pictures Studio; Music Producer: Masafumi "POPO" Kasahara; Music: Hideki Toriimoto; Narrator: Yoshihiro Nakamura; Assistant Director: Joji Yoshida; Reporter: Mika Koide; Cooperation: Dimension, Minako Nomura, Nozomi Inagaki; Opening: Hiroko Inagaki; Co-Production: Love Illusion Pictures; Creator: Kuroshobi no Kifujin; Director/Editor/Sound Effects/Camera: Kiyoshi Yamamoto	February 6, 2004	80 min.
Honto ni Atta! Noroi no Video 12	Executive Producers: Hajime Harie, Wataru Suzuki; Producers: Natsuko Kitani, Takafumi Ohashi; Camera: Daisuke Oya; Assistant Directors: Naoyuki Yokota, Kotaro Terauchi; Editor: Kazuyuki Sakamoto; Music: Akainu (as "Akainu Lights"); Cooperation: Go Shibata, Masayuki Sakata; Supervisor/Narrator: Yoshihiro Nakamura; Creator/Director: Kazuyuki Sakamoto	April 2, 2004	54 min.
Honto ni Atta! Noroi no Video Special 5	Executive Producers: Hajime Harie, Wataru Suzuki; Producers: Natsuko Kitani, Takafumi Ohashi; Assistant Directors: Naoyuki Yokota, Takashi Motoki, Hiroshi Eda, Yasunori Yokouchi; Production: Takashi Motoki, Fumika Koizumi; Camera: Kazuyuki Sakamoto, Takashi Motoki; Editors: Kazuyuki Sakamoto, Koji Shiraishi, Masayuki Sakata; Narrator: Yoshihiro Nakamura; Creators: Kazuyuki Sakamoto, Takashi Toyashiki; Music: Akainu (as "Akainu Lights"); Cooperation: Eiko Hamana, Masahide Ichii, Hiroshi Fukui; Director: Kazuyuki Sakamoto	July 2, 2004	88 min.
Honto ni Atta! Noroi no Video 13	Executive Producers: Hajime Harie, Wataru Suzuki; Producers: Natsuko Kitani, Takafumi Ohashi; Camera: Kazuyuki Sakamoto, Yasunori Yokouchi; Assistant Directors: Takashi Motoki, Hiroshi Eda; Editors: Kazuyuki Sakamoto, Hiroshi Eda; Production: Fumika Koizumi; Music: Akainu (as "Akainu Lights"); Narrator: Yoshihiro Nakamura; Cooperation: Masahide Ichii, Mitsumi Omuro; Creator/Director: Kazuyuki Sakamoto	September 3, 2004	56 min.
Honto ni Atta! Noroi no Video 14	Executive Producers: Hajime Harie, Wataru Suzuki; Producers: Natsuko Kitani, Takafumi Ohashi; Camera/Editors: Kazuyuki Sakamoto, Yoshihiro Nishimura; Assistant Directors: Takashi Toyashiki, Yasunori Yokouchi; Production: Fumika Koizumi; Music: Akainu (as "Akainu Lights"); Narrator: Yoshihiro Nakamura; Cooperation: Masahide Ichii, Mitsumi Omuro, Daisuke Oya, Sachiko Arakawa, Nishimura Eizo; Creator/Director: Kazuyuki Sakamoto	December 3, 2004	58 min.

=== 2005 ===
Title	Staff	Release Date(s)	Running Time
Honto ni Atta! Noroi no Video 15	Executive Producers: Hajime Harie, Wataru Suzuki; Producers: Natsuko Kitani, Takafumi Ohashi; Camera/Editor: Kazuyuki Sakamoto; Assistant Directors: Naoyuki Yokota, Takashi Toyashiki, Go Shibata; Production: Takashi Toyashiki; Music: Akainu (as "Akainu Lights"); Narrator: Yoshihiro Nakamura; Cooperation: Yoshihiro Nishimura (Nishimura Eizo), Fumika Koizumi, Satoshi Naka, Seitaro Suzuki, Maki Hamada; Creator/Director: Kazuyuki Sakamoto	March 4, 2005	56 min.
Honto ni Atta! Noroi no Video 16	Executive Producers: Hajime Harie, Wataru Suzuki; Producers: Natsuko Kitani, Takafumi Ohashi, Shuichi Isoda; Camera/Editor: Yohei Fukuda; Assistant Director: Akiko Naka; Music/Sound Effects: DRA Music Factory; Editing/Multi-Audio: Toyo Recording; Narrator: Yoshihiro Nakamura; Creator/Director: Yohei Fukuda	June 3, 2005	57 min.
Honto ni Atta! Noroi no Video 17	Executive Producers: Hajime Harie, Wataru Suzuki; Producers: Natsuko Kitani, Takafumi Ohashi, Shuichi Isoda; Camera: Yohei Fukuda, Katsura Iijima; Editors: Yohei Fukuda, Takuma Sakakawa; Assistant Directors: Tsuyoshi Marunaka, Akiko Naka, Shinobu Monma, Futoshi Nagase; Music/Sound Effects: DRA Music Factory; Editing/Multi-Audio: Toyo Recording; Narrator: Yoshihiro Nakamura; Creator/Director: Yohei Fukuda	August 5, 2005	60 min.
Honto ni Atta! Noroi no Video 18	Executive Producers: Hajime Harie, Wataru Suzuki; Producers: Natsuko Kitani, Shuichi Isoda; Camera: Yohei Fukuda; Audio: Futa Nagao; Editors: Takuma Sakakawa, Yoshitsugu Sagami, Yohei Fukuda; Music/Sound Effects: DRA Music Factory; Drivers: Katsura Iijima, Katsuyasu Aida, Yu Kato; Editing/Multi-Audio: Toyo Recording; Assistant Directors: Tsuyoshi Marunaka, Akiko Naka, Shinobu Monma, Chihiro Hamada; Cooperation: Naoyuki Yokota; Narrator: Yoshihiro Nakamura; Creator/Director: Yohei Fukuda	November 4, 2005	60 min.

=== 2006 ===
Title	Staff	Release Date(s)	Running Time
Honto ni Atta! Noroi no Video 19	Executive Producers: Hajime Harie, Wataru Suzuki; Producers: Natsuko Kitani, Shuichi Isoda; Assistant Directors: Naoyuki Yokota, Tsuyoshi Marunaka, Noritsumi Oba, Asako Sasaki; Camera: Yohei Fukuda, Shunsuke Kato; Editors: Yohei Fukuda, Kosuke Muroi, Shunsuke Kato; Music/Sound Effects: DRA Music Factory; Drivers: Yu Kato, Katsura Iijima; Editing/Multi-Audio: Toyo Recording; Narrator: Yoshihiro Nakamura; Creator/Director: Yohei Fukuda	March 3, 2006	59 min.
Honto ni Atta! Noroi no Video 20	Executive Producers: Hajime Harie, Wataru Suzuki; Producers: Natsuko Kitani, Shuichi Isoda; Camera: Yohei Fukuda; Audio: Futa Nagao; Editors: Yohei Fukuda, Shuichi Otake, Mitsuaki Aoyagi; Assistant Directors: Tsuyoshi Marunaka, Toru Sano, Akiko Naka, Emi Konno; Co-Creators: Jiro Nagae, Yoshitsugu Sagami; Music/Sound Effects: DRA Music Factory, Tomoyoshi Okura; Editing/Multi-Audio: Toyo Recording; Narrator: Yoshihiro Nakamura; Creator/Director: Yohei Fukuda	June 2, 2006	66 min.
Honto ni Atta! Noroi no Video 21	Executive Producers: Hajime Harie, Wataru Suzuki; Producers: Natsuko Kitani, Shuichi Isoda; Camera: Yohei Fukuda; Audio: Futa Nagao; Editors: Yohei Fukuda, Shuichi Otake, Mitsuaki Aoyagi; Assistant Directors: Toru Sano, Akiko Naka, Emi Konno; Co-Creators: Jiro Nagae, Yoshitsugu Sagami; Music/Sound Effects: DRA Music Factory, Tomoyoshi Okura; Editing/Multi-Audio: Toyo Recording; Narrator: Yoshihiro Nakamura; Creator/Director: Yohei Fukuda	August 4, 2006	75 min.
Honto ni Atta! Noroi no Video 22	Executive Producers: Hajime Harie, Wataru Suzuki; Producers: Natsuko Kitani, Shuichi Isoda; Production/Audio: Tomohito Hirooka; Assistant Directors: Seisho Okusada, Maya Kato, Noriyuki Yokota; Editors: Kazuto Kodama, Makoto Yamazaki; Music/Sound Effects: DRA Music Factory; Editing/Multi-Audio: Toyo Recording; Cooperation: Mai Miyoshi; Narrator: Yoshihiro Nakamura; Creator/Director: Kazuto Kodama	December 8, 2006	67 min.

=== 2007 ===
Title	Staff	Release Date(s)	Running Time
Honto ni Atta! Noroi no Video 23	Executive Producers: Hajime Harie, Wataru Suzuki; Producers: Natsuko Kitani, Shuichi Isoda; Production Manager: Tomohito Hirooka; Assistant Directors: Naoki Otani, Hiroki Iwasawa, Noriyuki Yokota, Toshiko Hata; Editor: Kazuto Kodama; Co-Editor: Kohei Okada; Music/Sound Effects: Tomoyuki Sugimoto; Editing/Multi-Audio: Toyo Recording; Narrator: Yoshihiro Nakamura; Creator/Director: Kazuto Kodama	March 2, 2007	84 min.
Honto ni Atta! Noroi no Video 24	Executive Producers: Hajime Harie, Wataru Suzuki; Producers: Natsuko Kitani, Shuichi Isoda; Assistant Directors: Hiroki Iwasawa, Nobuhide Kikuchi, Naoki Otani; Editors: Kazuto Kodama, Hiroki Iwasawa; Music/Sound Effects: Tomoyuki Sugimoto; Editing/Multi-Audio: Toyo Recording; Narrator: Yoshihiro Nakamura; Creator/Director: Kazuto Kodama	June 8, 2007	71 min.
Honto ni Atta! Noroi no Video Vol. 25	Executive Producers: Hajime Harie, Wataru Suzuki; Producers: Natsuko Kitani, Shuichi Isoda; Assistant Directors: Hiroki Iwasawa, Nobuhide Kikuchi; Music/Sound Effects: Tomoyuki Sugimoto; Editors: Kazuto Kodama, Hiroki Iwasawa; Editing/Multi-Audio: Toyo Recording; Narrator: Yoshihiro Nakamura; Creator/Director: Kazuto Kodama	August 3, 2007	68 min.
Honto ni Atta! Noroi no Video 26	Executive Producers: Hajime Harie, Wataru Suzuki; Producers: Natsuko Kitani, Shuichi Isoda; Creators: Kazuto Kodama, Nobuhide Kikuchi; Assistant Directors: Hiroki Iwasawa, Futaba Niki, Noriyuki Yokota; Music/Sound Effects: Tomoyuki Sugimoto; Editors: Kazuto Kodama, Hiroki Iwasawa; Editing/Multi-Audio: Toyo Recording; Narrator: Yoshihiro Nakamura; Director: Kazuto Kodama	November 2, 2007	67 min.

=== 2008 ===
Title	Staff	Release Date(s)	Running Time
Honto ni Atta! Noroi no Video 27	Executive Producers: Hajime Harie, Wataru Suzuki; Producers: Natsuko Kitani, Shuichi Isoda; Assistant Directors: Hiroki Iwasawa, Nobuhide Kikuchi; Music/Sound Effects: Tomoyuki Sugimoto; Editor: Akira Osugi; Editing/Multi-Audio: Toyo Recording; Narrator: Yoshihiro Nakamura; Creator/Director: Kazuto Kodama	February 8, 2008	62 min.
Honto ni Atta! Noroi no Video 28	Executive Producers: Hajime Harie, Wataru Suzuki; Producers: Natsuko Kitani, Shuichi Isoda; Assistant Directors: Hiroki Iwasawa, Nobuhide Kikuchi; Music/Sound Effects: Yosuke Uda; Editor: Akira Osugi; Editing/Multi-Audio: Toyo Recording; Narrator: Yoshihiro Nakamura; Creator/Director: Kazuto Kodama	June 6, 2008	68 min.
Honto ni Atta! Noroi no Video 29	Executive Producers: Hajime Harie, Wataru Suzuki; Producers: Natsuko Kitani, Shuichi Isoda; Assistant Directors: Hiroki Iwasawa, Nobuhide Kikuchi; Music: Tomoyuki Sugimoto; Editor/Sound Effects: Akira Osugi; Editing/Multi-Audio: Toyo Recording; Narrator: Yoshihiro Nakamura; Creator/Director: Kazuto Kodama	August 8, 2008	64 min.
Honto ni Atta! Noroi no Video 30	Executive Producers: Hajime Harie, Wataru Suzuki; Producers: Natsuko Kitani, Shuichi Isoda; Assistant Directors: Hiroki Iwasawa, Nobuhide Kikuchi; Music/Sound Effects: Tomoyuki Sugimoto; Editor: Hiroki Iwasawa; Narrator: Yoshihiro Nakamura; Creator/Director: Kazuto Kodama	November 7, 2008	64 min.

=== 2009 ===
Title	Staff	Release Date(s)	Running Time
Honto ni Atta! Noroi no Video 31	Executive Producers: Hajime Harie, Wataru Suzuki; Producers: Natsuko Kitani, Shuichi Isoda; Assistant Director: Hiroki Iwasawa; Music/Sound Effects: Tomoyuki Sugimoto; Editor: Akira Osugi; Editing/Multi-Audio: TSP; Narrator: Yoshihiro Nakamura; Creator/Director: Kazuto Kodama	March 6, 2009	57 min.
Honto ni Atta! Noroi no Video 32	Executive Producers: Hajime Harie, Wataru Suzuki; Producers: Natsuko Kitani, Shuichi Isoda; Assistant Directors: Hiroki Iwasawa, Nobuhide Kikuchi, Toshie Watanabe; Music/Sound Effects: Tasuku Arai, Kaori Tsutsui, Ayako Minami; Editor: Akira Osugi; Editing/Multi-Audio: TSP; Narrator: Yoshihiro Nakamura; Creator/Director: Kazuto Kodama	June 5, 2009	58 min.
Honto ni Atta! Noroi no Video 33	Executive Producers: Hajime Harie, Wataru Suzuki; Producers: Natsuko Kitani, Shuichi Isoda; Creators: Kazuto Kodama, Hiroki Iwasawa; Assistant Directors: Hiroki Iwasawa, Nobuhide Kikuchi, Toshie Watanabe; Music/Sound Effects: Tasuku Arai, Kaori Tsutsui, Ayako Minami; Editor: Akira Osugi; Editing/Multi-Audio: TSP; Narrator: Yoshihiro Nakamura; Director: Kazuto Kodama	July 3, 2009	64 min.
Honto ni Atta! Noroi no Video 34	Executive Producers: Hajime Harie, Wataru Suzuki; Producers: Natsuko Kitani, Shuichi Isoda; Creators: Kazuto Kodama, Hiroki Iwasawa; Assistant Directors: Hiroki Iwasawa, Toshie Watanabe; Music/Sound Effects: Tasuku Arai, Kaori Tsutsui, Ayako Minami; Editor: Akira Osugi; Editing/Multi-Audio: TSP; Narrator: Yoshihiro Nakamura; Director: Kazuto Kodama	August 7, 2009	64 min.
Honto ni Atta! Noroi no Video 35	Executive Producers: Hajime Harie, Wataru Suzuki; Producers: Natsuko Kitani, Shuichi Isoda; Creators: Kazuto Kodama, Kenta Inohara; Assistant Directors: Akiko Nagata, Itsuki Hisamoto; Music/Sound Effects: Yosuke Uda, Akira Osugi; Editor: Akira Osugi; Editing/Multi-Audio: TSP; Narrator: Yoshihiro Nakamura; Director: Kazuto Kodama	December 4, 2009	56 min.

=== 2010 ===
Title	Staff	Release Date(s)	Running Time
Honto ni Atta! Noroi no Video 36	Executive Producers: Hajime Harie, Wataru Suzuki; Producers: Shoei Miyata, Shuichi Isoda; Creators: Kazuto Kodama, Kenta Inohara; Assistant Directors: Akiko Nagata, Toshiki Iwasawa, Miho Watanabe; Music/Sound Effects: Tasuku Arai, Ayako Minami, Akira Osugi; Editor: Akira Osugi; Editing/Multi-Audio: TSP; Narrator: Yoshihiro Nakamura; Director: Kazuto Kodama	March 5, 2010	60 min.
Honto ni Atta! Noroi no Video 37	Executive Producers: Hajime Harie, Wataru Suzuki; Producers: Shoei Miyata, Shuichi Isoda; Creators: Kazuto Kodama, Kenta Inohara; Assistant Directors: Hajime Itsuki, Akiko Nagata, Yuka Itakura; Music/Sound Effects: Tasuku Arai, Akira Osugi; Editor: Akira Osugi; Editing/Multi-Audio: TSP; Narrator: Yoshihiro Nakamura; Director: Kazuto Kodama	June 4, 2010	59 min.
Honto ni Atta! Noroi no Video 38	Executive Producers: Hajime Harie, Wataru Suzuki; Producers: Shoei Miyata, Shuichi Isoda; Creators: Kazuto Kodama, Kenta Inohara; Assistant Directors: Hajime Itsuki, Akiko Nagata, Yuka Itakura; Music/Sound Effects: Tasuku Arai, Akira Osugi; Editor: Akira Osugi; Editing/Multi-Audio: TSP; Narrator: Yoshihiro Nakamura; Director: Kazuto Kodama	July 2, 2010	59 min.
Honto ni Atta! Noroi no Video 39	Executive Producers: Hajime Harie, Wataru Suzuki; Producers: Shoei Miyata, Shuichi Isoda; Creators: Kazuto Kodama, Kenta Inohara; Assistant Directors: Hajime Itsuki, Akiko Nagata, Yuka Itakura; Music/Sound Effects: Tasuku Arai, Akira Osugi; Editors: Akira Osugi, Kazuto Kodama; Editing/Multi-Audio: TSP; Narrator: Yoshihiro Nakamura; Director: Kazuto Kodama	August 6, 2010	58 min.
Honto ni Atta! Noroi no Video Vol. 40	Executive Producers: Hajime Harie, Wataru Suzuki; Producers: Shoei Miyata, Shuichi Isoda; Assistant Directors: Hajime Itsuki, Akiko Nagata, Miho Watanabe; Music/Sound Effects: Tasuku Arai, Akira Osugi; Editor: Kaoru Shoji; Editing/Multi-Audio: TSP; Narrator: Yoshihiro Nakamura; Director: Kazuto Kodama	December 3, 2010	57 min.

=== 2011 ===
Title	Staff	Release Date(s)	Running Time
Honto ni Atta! Noroi no Video 41	Executive Producers: Hajime Harie, Wataru Suzuki; Producers: Shoei Miyata, Shuichi Isoda; Assistant Directors: Akiko Nagata, Shunji Ishii; Music/Sound Effects: Tasuku Arai, Akira Osugi; Editor: Kaoru Shoji; Editing/Multi-Audio: TSP; Narrator: Yoshihiro Nakamura; Director: Kazuto Kodama	March 4, 2011	58 min.
Honto ni Atta! Noroi no Video 42	Executive Producers: Hajime Harie, Wataru Suzuki; Producers: Shoei Miyata, Shuichi Isoda; Assistant Directors: Toshie Watanabe, Hideto Sakai, Yukihiro Sakaguchi, Yuki Agusa; Music/Sound Effects: Bon, Pomu, Gentaro Iida; Editors: Akira Osugi, Hiroki Iwasawa, Yukihiro Sakaguchi; Editing/Multi-Audio: TSP; Narrator: Yoshihiro Nakamura; Creator/Director: Hiroki Iwasawa	June 3, 2011	74 min.
Honto ni Atta! Noroi no Video 43	Executive Producers: Hajime Harie, Wataru Suzuki; Producers: Shoei Miyata, Shuichi Isoda; Recording Assistants: Toshie Watanabe, Hideto Sakai, Yukihiro Sakaguchi, Yuki Agusa; Music/Sound Effects: Bon, Pomu, Gentaro Iida, Riku Nagata; Editors: Akira Osugi, Hiroki Iwasawa, Yukihiro Sakaguchi, Hideto Sakai; Editing/Multi-Audio: TSP; Narrator: Yoshihiro Nakamura; Creator/Director: Hiroki Iwasawa	July 2, 2011	64 min.
Honto ni Atta! Noroi no Video 44	Executive Producers: Hajime Harie, Wataru Suzuki; Producers: Shoei Miyata, Shuichi Isoda; Assistant Directors: Yuki Agusa, Naomi Kawai, Nobuhide Kikuchi, Toshie Watanabe, Yukihiro Sakaguchi; Music/Sound Effects: Bon, Pomu, Gentaro Iida, Riku Nagata; Editors: Akira Osugi, Hiroki Iwasawa, Yukihiro Sakaguchi, Hideto Sakai; Editing/Multi-Audio: TSP; Narrator: Yoshihiro Nakamura; Creator/Director: Hiroki Iwasawa	August 5, 2011	61 min.
Honto ni Atta! Noroi no Video 45	Executive Producers: Hajime Harie, Wataru Suzuki; Producers: Shoei Miyata, Shuichi Isoda; Assistant Directors: Nobuhide Kikuchi, Naomi Kawai, Akiko Nagata; Music/Sound Effects: Gentaro Iida, Bon; Editor: Hiroki Iwasawa; Editing/Multi-Audio: TSP; Narrator: Yoshihiro Nakamura; Creator/Director: Hiroki Iwasawa	December 2, 2011	69 min.

=== 2012 ===
Title	Staff	Release Date(s)	Running Time
Honto ni Atta! Noroi no Video 46	Executive Producers: Hajime Harie, Wataru Suzuki; Producers: Shoei Miyata, Shuichi Isoda; Assistant Directors: Naomi Kawai, Akiko Nagata, Yuki Agusa; Music/Sound Effects: Gentaro Iida, Bon; Editors: Hiroki Iwasawa, Takuya Yokoyama; Editing/Multi-Audio: TSP; Narrator: Yoshihiro Nakamura; Creator/Director: Hiroki Iwasawa	March 2, 2012	64 min.
Honto ni Atta! Noroi no Video 47	Executive Producers: Hajime Harie, Wataru Suzuki; Producers: Shoei Miyata, Kei Sawada; Assistant Directors: Nobuhide Kikuchi, Naomi Kawai, Yuki Agusa, Katsuya Yoneshima; Music/Sound Effects: Bon, Gentaro Iida; Editors: Hiroki Iwasawa, Takuya Yokoyama; Editing/Multi-Audio: TSP; Narrator: Yoshihiro Nakamura; Creator/Director: Hiroki Iwasawa	June 2, 2012	66 min.
Honto ni Atta! Noroi no Video 48	Executive Producers: Hajime Harie, Wataru Suzuki; Producers: Shoei Miyata, Kei Sawada; Assistant Directors: Nobuhide Kikuchi, Naomi Kawai, Katsuya Yoneshima, Yuki Agusa; Music/Sound Effects: Bon, Gentaro Iida; Editors: Hiroki Iwasawa, Nobuhide Kikuchi; Editing/Multi-Audio: TSP; Narrator: Yoshihiro Nakamura; Creator/Director: Hiroki Iwasawa	July 6, 2012	67 min.
Honto ni Atta! Noroi no Video 49	Executive Producers: Hajime Harie, Wataru Suzuki; Producers: Shoei Miyata, Kei Sawada; Assistant Directors: Nobuhide Kikuchi, Toshiyuki Yokota, Naomi Kawai, Katsuya Yoneshima; Music/Sound Effects: Bon, Gentaro Iida; Editors: Hiroki Iwasawa, Nobuhide Kikuchi; Editing/Multi-Audio: TSP; Narrator: Yoshihiro Nakamura; Creator/Director: Hiroki Iwasawa	August 3, 2012	71 min.
Honto ni Atta! Noroi no Video 50	Executive Producers: Hajime Harie, Wataru Suzuki; Producers: Shoei Miyata, Kei Sawada; Assistant Directors: Nobuhide Kikuchi, Naomi Kawai, Toshiyuki Yokota, Mina Nakayama; Editors: Hiroki Iwasawa, Nobuhide Kikuchi; Music/Sound Effects: Bon, Gentaro Iida; Narrator: Yoshihiro Nakamura; Creator/Director: Hiroki Iwasawa	December 7, 2012	78 min.

=== 2013 ===
Title	Staff	Release Date(s)	Running Time
Honto ni Atta! Noroi no Video 51	Executive Producers: Hajime Harie, Wataru Suzuki; Producers: Shoei Miyata, Kei Sawada; Assistant Directors: Nobuhide Kikuchi, Naomi Kawai, Yuki Agusa, Kensuke Inoue, Daisuke Oshiki; Editor: Hiroki Iwasawa; Music/Sound Effects: Gentaro Iida, Bon; Narrator: Yoshihiro Nakamura; Creator/Director: Hiroki Iwasawa	March 2, 2013	63 min.
Honto ni Atta! Noroi no Video 52	Executive Producers: Hajime Harie, Wataru Suzuki; Producers: Shoei Miyata, Kei Sawada; Assistant Directors: Naomi Kawai, Daisuke Oshiki, Kensuke Inoue, Mina Nakayama; Creators: Hiroki Iwasawa, Daisuke Oshiki; Editor: Hiroki Iwasawa; Title Producer: Misato Torio; Music/Sound Effects: Gentaro Iida, Bon; Narrator: Yoshihiro Nakamura; Director: Hiroki Iwasawa	June 7, 2013	66 min.
Honto ni Atta! Noroi no Video 53	Executive Producers: Hajime Harie, Wataru Suzuki; Producers: Shoei Miyata, Kei Sawada; Assistant Directors: Naomi Kawai, Daisuke Oshiki, Kensuke Inoue, Mina Nakayama; Creators: Hiroki Iwasawa, Daisuke Oshiki; Editor: Hiroki Iwasawa; Title Producer: Misato Torio; Music/Sound Effects: Gentaro Iida, Bon; Narrator: Yoshihiro Nakamura; Director: Hiroki Iwasawa	July 5, 2013	63 min.
Honto ni Atta! Noroi no Video 54	Executive Producers: Hajime Harie, Wataru Suzuki; Producers: Shoei Miyata, Kei Sawada; Assistant Directors: Daisuke Oshiki, Kensuke Inoue, Naomi Kawai, Yuki Agusa, Mina Nakayama, Nobuhide Kikuchi (former); Creators: Hiroki Iwasawa, Daisuke Oshiki; Editors: Nobuhide Kikuchi, Hiroki Iwasawa; Title Producer: Misato Torio; Music/Sound Effects: Gentaro Iida, Bon; Narrator: Yoshihiro Nakamura; Director: Hiroki Iwasawa	August 2, 2013	60 min.
Gekijō-ban: Honto ni Atta! Noroi no Video 55	Executive Producers: Hajime Harie, Wataru Suzuki; Producers: Shoei Miyata, Kei Sawada; Assistant Directors: Nobuhide Kikuchi, Naomi Kawai, Yuki Agusa, Kensuke Inoue, Mina Nakayama, Daisuke Oshiki; Creators/Editors: Hiroki Iwasawa, Nobuhide Kikuchi; Music/Sound Effects: Bon, Gentaro Iida; Narrator: Yoshihiro Nakamura; Director: Hiroki Iwasawa	November 23, 2013 (Theaters); December 6, 2013 (DVD)	107 min.

=== 2014 ===
Title	Staff	Release Date(s)	Running Time
Honto ni Atta! Noroi no Video 56	Executive Producers: Hajime Harie, Wataru Suzuki; Producers: Shoei Miyata, Masataka Iwasaki; Assistant Directors: Naomi Kawai, Toma Morisawa, Ryoma Masumoto; Creator/Editor: Nobuhide Kikuchi; Music/Sound Effects: Bon; Title Producer: Satoko Yamazaki; Narrator: Yoshihiro Nakamura; Director: Nobuhide Kikuchi	March 5, 2014	65 min.
Honto ni Atta! Noroi no Video 57	Executive Producers: Hajime Harie, Wataru Suzuki; Producers: Shoei Miyata, Masataka Iwasaki, Shu Iwamura; Assistant Directors: Naomi Kawai, Toma Morisawa, Ryoma Masumoto; Creator/Editor: Nobuhide Kikuchi; Music/Sound Effects: Bon, Daishi Suzuki, Yo-ko (from D.M.P), Ska (from D.M.P); Title Producer: Satoko Yamazaki; Narrator: Yoshihiro Nakamura; Director: Nobuhide Kikuchi	June 4, 2014	57 min.
Honto ni Atta! Noroi no Video 58	Executive Producers: Hajime Harie, Wataru Suzuki; Producers: Shoei Miyata, Masataka Iwasaki, Shu Iwamura; Assistant Directors: Naomi Kawai, Toma Morisawa, Ryoma Masumoto; Editors: Nobuhide Kikuchi, Toma Morisawa; Music/Sound Effects: Bon, Daishi Suzuki, Yo-ko (from D.M.P), Ska (from D.M.P); Title Producer: Satoko Yamazaki; Narrator: Yoshihiro Nakamura; Creator/Director: Nobuhide Kikuchi	July 2, 2014	62 min.
Honto ni Atta! Noroi no Video 59	Executive Producers: Hajime Harie, Wataru Suzuki; Producers: Shoei Miyata, Masataka Iwasaki, Shu Iwamura; Assistant Directors: Naomi Kawai, Toma Morisawa, Ryoma Masumoto; Editors: Nobuhide Kikuchi, Toma Morisawa; Creators: Nobuhide Kikuchi, Ryoma Masumoto; Music/Sound Effects: Bon, Daishi Suzuki, Yo-ko (from D.M.P), Ska (from D.M.P), Ayumu Hayabusa; Title Producer: Satoko Yamazaki; Narrator: Yoshihiro Nakamura; Director: Nobuhide Kikuchi	August 2, 2014	61 min.
Honto ni Atta! Noroi no Video 60	Executive Producers: Hajime Harie, Wataru Suzuki; Producers: Shoei Miyata, Shu Iwamura; Assistant Directors: Naomi Kawai, Toma Morisawa, Ryoma Masumoto; Title Producer: Masahiro Yamaya; Music/Sound Effects: Bon, Daishi Suzuki; Narrator: Yoshihiro Nakamura; Creator/Director: Nobuhide Kikuchi	December 3, 2014	78 min.

=== 2015 ===
Title	Staff	Release Date(s)	Running Time
Honto ni Atta! Noroi no Video 61	Executive Producers: Hajime Harie, Wataru Suzuki; Producers: Shoei Miyata, Shu Iwamura; Assistant Directors: Naomi Kawai, Toma Morisawa, Ryoma Masumoto, Yu Kawakami; Music/Sound Effects: Bon, Daishi Suzuki; Narrator: Yoshihiro Nakamura; Creator/Director: Nobuhide Kikuchi	March 4, 2015	87 min.
Honto ni Atta! Noroi no Video 62	Executive Producers: Hajime Harie, Wataru Suzuki; Producers: Shoei Miyata, Shu Iwamura; Assistant Directors: Naomi Kawai, Toma Morisawa, Yosuke Yamashita, Yasunari Konno, Chihiro Sato; Music/Sound Effects: Bon, Daishi Suzuki; Editors: Nobuhide Kikuchi, Yasunari Konno; Title Producer: Hiroki Fujimoto; Creators: Nobuhide Kikuchi, Toma Morisawa; Narrator: Yoshihiro Nakamura; Director: Nobuhide Kikuchi	June 3, 2015	72 min.
Honto ni Atta! Noroi no Video 63	Executive Producers: Hajime Harie, Wataru Suzuki; Producers: Shoei Miyata, Shu Iwamura; Assistant Directors: Naomi Kawai, Toma Morisawa, Yosuke Yamashita, Yasunari Konno, Chihiro Sato; Music/Sound Effects: Bon, Daishi Suzuki; Editors: Nobuhide Kikuchi, Yasunari Konno; Title Producer: Hiroki Fujimoto; Creators: Nobuhide Kikuchi, Seiji Tashiro; Narrator: Yoshihiro Nakamura; Director: Nobuhide Kikuchi	July 3, 2015	75 min.
Honto ni Atta! Noroi no Video 64	Executive Producers: Hajime Harie, Wataru Suzuki; Producers: Shoei Miyata, Shu Iwamura; Assistant Directors: Naomi Kawai, Toma Morisawa, Yosuke Yamashita, Yasunari Konno, Chihiro Sato; Music/Sound Effects: Bon, Daishi Suzuki; Editors: Nobuhide Kikuchi, Yasunari Konno; Title Producer: Hiroki Fujimoto; Creators: Nobuhide Kikuchi, Toma Morisawa; Narrator: Yoshihiro Nakamura; Director: Nobuhide Kikuchi	August 5, 2015	85 min.
Honto ni Atta! Noroi no Video 65	Executive Producers: Hajime Harie, Wataru Suzuki; Producers: Shoei Miyata, Shu Iwamura; Assistant Directors: Naomi Kawai, Yasunari Konno, Yosuke Yamashita, Toma Morisawa; Music/Sound Effects: Bon, Daishi Suzuki; Creators: Nobuhide Kikuchi, Koichi Kubodera; Narrator: Yoshihiro Nakamura; Director: Nobuhide Kikuchi	December 4, 2015	91 min.

=== 2016 ===
Title	Staff	Release Date(s)	Running Time
Honto ni Atta! Noroi no Video 66	Executive Producers: Hajime Harie, Wataru Suzuki; Producers: Shoei Miyata, Shu Iwamura; Assistant Directors: Naomi Kawai, Toma Morisawa, Yosuke Yamashita, Yasunari Konno; Music/Sound Effects: Bon, Daishi Suzuki; Creators: Nobuhide Kikuchi, Mitsuo Adachi, Yasuaki Yamada; Narrator: Yoshihiro Nakamura; Director: Nobuhide Kikuchi	March 2, 2016	91 min.
Honto ni Atta! Noroi no Video 67	Executive Producers: Hajime Harie, Wataru Suzuki; Producers: Shoei Miyata, Shu Iwamura; Assistant Directors: Naomi Kawai, Toma Morisawa, Yuki Agusa, Kenichi Kumakura; Music/Sound Effects: Bon, Daishi Suzuki; Editors: Nobuhide Kikuchi, Yasunari Konno; Title Producer: GLUEP; Creators: Nobuhide Kikuchi, Mitsuo Adachi, Shinichi Iwamoto, Yasunari Konno; Narrator: Yoshihiro Nakamura; Director: Nobuhide Kikuchi	June 3, 2016	80 min.
Honto ni Atta! Noroi no Video 68	Executive Producers: Hajime Harie, Wataru Suzuki; Producers: Shoei Miyata, Shu Iwamura; Assistant Directors: Naomi Kawai, Toma Morisawa, Yuki Agusa, Kenichi Kumakura; Music/Sound Effects: Bon, Daishi Suzuki; Editors: Nobuhide Kikuchi, Yasunari Konno; Title Producer: GLUEP; Creators: Nobuhide Kikuchi, Mitsuo Adachi, Taiki Yamazaki, Yasunari Konno; Narrator: Yoshihiro Nakamura; Director: Nobuhide Kikuchi	July 2, 2016	91 min.
Honto ni Atta! Noroi no Video 69	Executive Producers: Hajime Harie, Wataru Suzuki; Producers: Shoei Miyata, Shu Iwamura; Assistant Directors: Naomi Kawai, Toma Morisawa, Yuki Agusa, Kenichi Kumakura; Music/Sound Effects: Bon, Daishi Suzuki; Editors: Nobuhide Kikuchi, Yasunari Konno; Title Producer: GLUEP; Creators: Nobuhide Kikuchi, Mitsuo Adachi, Shinichi Iwamoto, Yasunari Konno; Narrator: Yoshihiro Nakamura; Director: Nobuhide Kikuchi	August 3, 2016	94 min.
Honto ni Atta! Noroi no Video 70	Executive Producers: Hajime Harie, Wataru Suzuki; Producers: Shoei Miyata, Shu Iwamura; Assistant Directors: Naomi Kawai, Toma Morisawa, Toshiki Kitamura; Editors: Nobuhide Kikuchi, Yasunari Konno; Music/Sound Effects: Bon, Daishi Suzuki; Creators: Nobuhide Kikuchi, Yasunari Konno; Narrator: Yoshihiro Nakamura; Director: Nobuhide Kikuchi	December 2, 2016	101 min.

=== 2017 ===
Title	Staff	Release Date(s)	Running Time
Honto ni Atta! Noroi no Video 71	Executive Producers: Hajime Harie, Wataru Suzuki; Producers: Shoei Miyata, Shu Iwamura; Assistant Directors: Naomi Kawai, Kiyomi Samukawa; Editor: Kayoko Endo; Music: Bon; Creators: Yoshitsugu Sagami, Kotaro Terauchi, Yohei Fukuda; Narrator: Yoshihiro Nakamura; Directors: Yohei Fukuda, Kotaro Terauchi	March 3, 2017	66 min.
Honto ni Atta! Noroi no Video 72	Executive Producers: Hajime Harie, Wataru Suzuki; Producers: Shoei Miyata, Shu Iwamura; Assistant Directors: Naomi Kawai, Kiyomi Samukawa; Editor: Kayoko Endo; Music: Bon; Creators: Yoshitsugu Sagami, Kotaro Terauchi, Yohei Fukuda, Takato Nishi; Narrator: Yoshihiro Nakamura; Directors: Yohei Fukuda, Kotaro Terauchi	June 2, 2017	69 min.
Honto ni Atta! Noroi no Video 73	Executive Producers: Hajime Harie, Wataru Suzuki; Producers: Shoei Miyata, Shu Iwamura; Assistant Directors: Naomi Kawai, Kiyomi Samukawa, Hitomi Maiki, Da Li; Assistant Director Support: Yuji Otsuka; Editor: Kayoko Endo; Music: Bon; Creators: Yoshitsugu Sagami, Kotaro Terauchi, Yohei Fukuda, Takato Nishi; Narrator: Yoshihiro Nakamura; Directors: Yohei Fukuda, Kotaro Terauchi	July 5, 2017	78 min.
Honto ni Atta! Noroi no Video 74	Executive Producers: Hajime Harie, Wataru Suzuki; Producers: Shoei Miyata, Shu Iwamura; Assistant Directors: Naomi Kawai, Kiyomi Samukawa, Hitomi Maiki, Da Li; Assistant Director Support: Yuji Otsuka; Editor: Kayoko Endo; Music: Bon; Creators: Yoshitsugu Sagami, Kotaro Terauchi, Yohei Fukuda, Takato Nishi; Narrator: Yoshihiro Nakamura; Directors: Yohei Fukuda, Kotaro Terauchi	August 2, 2017	77 min.

=== 2018 ===
Title	Staff	Release Date(s)	Running Time
Honto ni Atta! Noroi no Video 75	Executive Producers: Hajime Harie, Wataru Suzuki; Producers: Shoei Miyata, Shu Iwamura; Assistant Directors: Naomi Kawai, Kiyomi Samukawa, Hitomi Maiki, Da Li; Assistant Director Support: Yuji Otsuka; Editors: Kayoko Endo, Yohei Fukuda; Co-Editors: Nobuhide Kikuchi, Takuya Ito, Yasutake Torii; Music/Sound Effects: Bon; Creators: Yohei Fukuda, Kotaro Terauchi, Yoshitsugu Sagami, Takato Nishi, Toma Morisawa; Narrator: Yoshihiro Nakamura; Directors: Yohei Fukuda, Kotaro Terauchi	January 6, 2018	88 min.
Honto ni Atta! Noroi no Video 76	Executive Producers: Hajime Harie, Wataru Suzuki; Producers: Shoei Miyata, Shu Iwamura; Assistant Directors: Ayumu Yamamotoya, Kiyomi Samukawa, Hitomi Maiki, Da Li; Assistant Director Support: Yuji Otsuka; Editors: Yohei Fukuda, Nobuhide Kikuchi, Hikaru Okita; Music/Sound Effects: Bon; Creators: Yohei Fukuda, Takato Nishi, Naomi Kawai, Yasunari Konno, Hikaru Okita; Co-Directors: Nobuhide Kikuchi, Hikaru Okita; Narrator: Yoshihiro Nakamura; Directors: Naomi Kawai, Yohei Fukuda	April 4, 2018	86 min.
Honto ni Atta! Noroi no Video 77	Executive Producers: Hajime Harie, Wataru Suzuki; Producers: Shoei Miyata, Shu Iwamura; Assistant Directors: Ayumu Yamamotoya, Kiyomi Samukawa, Hitomi Maiki, Da Li; Assistant Director Support: Yuji Otsuka; Editors: Yohei Fukuda, Nobuhide Kikuchi, Hiroki Fujimoto; Music/Sound Effects: Bon; Creators: Yohei Fukuda, Naomi Kawai, Tokuya Niitsu, Yoshinobu Mino; Co-Directors: Nobuhide Kikuchi, Yoshinobu Mino; Narrator: Yoshihiro Nakamura; Directors: Naomi Kawai, Yohei Fukuda	July 4, 2018	88 min.
Honto ni Atta! Noroi no Video 78	Executive Producers: Hajime Harie, Wataru Suzuki; Producers: Shoei Miyata, Shu Iwamura; Assistant Directors: Ayumu Yamamotoya, Kiyomi Samukawa, Hitomi Maiki, Da Li; Assistant Director Support: Yuji Otsuka; Editors: Yohei Fukuda, Nobuhide Kikuchi, Hiroki Fujimoto; Music/Sound Effects: Bon; Creators: Yohei Fukuda, Naomi Kawai, Tokuya Niitsu, Yoshinobu Mino; Co-Directors: Nobuhide Kikuchi, Yoshinobu Mino; Narrator: Yoshihiro Nakamura; Directors: Naomi Kawai, Yohei Fukuda	August 3, 2018	115 min.
Honto ni Atta! Noroi no Video 79	Executive Producers: Hajime Harie, Wataru Suzuki; Producers: Shoei Miyata, Shu Iwamura; Assistant Directors: Ayumu Yamamotoya, Kiyomi Samukawa, Hitomi Maiki, Da Li; Assistant Director In-Training: Maona Hoshi; Assistant Director Support: Yuji Otsuka; Editors: Yohei Fukuda, Nobuhide Kikuchi, Hiroki Fujimoto; Music/Sound Effects: Bon; Creators: Yohei Fukuda, Naomi Kawai, Tokuya Niitsu, Yoshinobu Mino; Co-Directors: Nobuhide Kikuchi, Yoshinobu Mino; Narrator: Yoshihiro Nakamura; Directors: Naomi Kawai, Yohei Fukuda	December 5, 2018	68 min.

=== 2019 ===
Title	Staff	Release Date(s)	Running Time
Honto ni Atta! Noroi no Video 80	Executive Producers: Hajime Harie, Wataru Suzuki; Producers: Shoei Miyata, Shu Iwamura; Assistant Directors: Ayumu Yamamotoya, Kiyomi Samukawa, Hitomi Maiki, Da Li, Maona Hoshi; Assistant Director Support: Yuji Otsuka; Editors: Yohei Fukuda, Nobuhide Kikuchi, Hiroki Fujimoto; Music/Sound Effects: Bon; Creators: Yohei Fukuda, Naomi Kawai, Tokuya Niitsu, Yoshinobu Mino; Co-Directors: Nobuhide Kikuchi, Yoshinobu Mino, Hiroki Fujimoto, Takayuki Hosonuma; Narrator: Yoshihiro Nakamura; Directors: Naomi Kawai, Yohei Fukuda	January 9, 2019	86 min.
Honto ni Atta! Noroi no Video 81	Executive Producers: Hajime Harie, Wataru Suzuki; Producers: Shoei Miyata, Shu Iwamura; Assistant Directors: Ryo Nakata, Haru Chibana; Co-Directors: Yohei Fukuda, Yoshinobu Mino, Hiroki Fujimoto, Takayuki Hosonuma; Creator/Editor: KANEDA; Music/Sound Effects: Ryo Kyutoku, Bon; Narrator: Yoshihiro Nakamura; Director: KANEDA	April 3, 2019	85 min.
Honto ni Atta! Noroi no Video 82	Executive Producers: Hajime Harie, Wataru Suzuki; Producers: Akira Harie, Shu Iwamura; Assistant Directors: Ryo Nakata, Haru Chibana; Music/Sound Effects: Ryo Kyutoku, Bon; Creators: KANEDA, Tokuya Niitsu, Yoshinobu Mino; Co-Directors: Nobuhide Kikuchi, Yoshinobu Mino, Hiroki Fujimoto, Takayuki Hosonuma; Narrator: Yoshihiro Nakamura; Director: KANEDA	July 3, 2019	61 min.
Honto ni Atta! Noroi no Video 83	Executive Producers: Hajime Harie, Wataru Suzuki; Producers: Akira Harie, Shu Iwamura; Assistant Directors: Ryo Nakata, Haru Chibana; Music/Sound Effects: Ryo Kyutoku, Bon; Creators: KANEDA, Tokuya Niitsu, Yoshinobu Mino; Co-Directors: Nobuhide Kikuchi, Yoshinobu Mino, Hiroki Fujimoto, Takayuki Hosonuma; Narrator: Yoshihiro Nakamura; Director: KANEDA	August 3, 2019	59 min.
Honto ni Atta! Noroi no Video 84	Executive Producers: Hajime Harie, Wataru Suzuki; Producers: Akira Harie, Shu Iwamura; Assistant Directors: Ryo Nakata, Haru Chibana; Music/Sound Effects: Ryo Kyutoku, Bon; Creators: KANEDA, Tokuya Niitsu, Yoshinobu Mino; Co-Directors: Nobuhide Kikuchi, Yoshinobu Mino, Hiroki Fujimoto, Takayuki Hosonuma; Narrator: Yoshihiro Nakamura; Director: KANEDA	September 4, 2019	70 min.
Honto ni Atta! Noroi no Video 85	Executive Producers: Hajime Harie, Wataru Suzuki; Producers: Akira Harie, Shu Iwamura; Assistant Directors: Ryo Nakata, Haru Chibana, Minoru Matsuo; Music/Sound Effects: nine value set, Bon; Creators: KANEDA, Tokuya Niitsu; Co-Directors: Nobuhide Kikuchi, Hiroki Fujimoto, Takayuki Hosonuma; Narrator: Yoshihiro Nakamura; Director: KANEDA	November 27, 2019	71 min.

=== 2020 ===
Title	Staff	Release Date(s)	Running Time
Honto ni Atta! Noroi no Video 86	Executive Producers: Hajime Harie, Wataru Suzuki; Producers: Akira Harie, Shu Iwamura; Assistant Directors: Ryo Nakata, Haru Chibana, Minoru Matsuo; Music/Sound Effects: nine value set, Bon; Creators: KANEDA, Tokuya Niitsu; Co-Directors: Nobuhide Kikuchi, Hiroki Fujimoto, Takayuki Hosonuma; Narrator: Yoshihiro Nakamura; Director: KANEDA	January 8, 2020	76 min.
Honto ni Atta! Noroi no Video 87	Executive Producers: Hajime Harie, Wataru Suzuki; Producers: Akira Harie, Shu Iwamura; Assistant Directors: Ryo Nakata, Haru Chibana, Kenta Ueda; Music/Sound Effects: nine value set, Bon; Creators: KANEDA, Takato Nishi; Co-Directors: Nobuhide Kikuchi, Yoshinobu Mino, Hiroki Fujimoto, Takayuki Hosonuma, Kazuomi Makita; Narrator: Yoshihiro Nakamura; Director: KANEDA	June 3, 2020	63 min.
Honto ni Atta! Noroi no Video 88	Executive Producers: Hajime Harie, Wataru Suzuki; Producers: Akira Harie, Shu Iwamura; Assistant Directors: Naomi Kawai, Ryo Nakata, Haru Chibana, Kenta Ueda; Music/Sound Effects: nine value set, Bon; Creators: KANEDA, Takato Nishi; Co-Directors: Nobuhide Kikuchi, Yoshinobu Mino, Hiroki Fujimoto, Takayuki Hosonuma, Kazuomi Makita; Narrator: Yoshihiro Nakamura; Director: KANEDA	July 3, 2020	64 min.
Honto ni Atta! Noroi no Video 89	Executive Producers: Hajime Harie, Wataru Suzuki; Producers: Akira Harie, Shu Iwamura; Assistant Directors: Naomi Kawai, Ryo Nakata, Haru Chibana, Kenta Ueda; Music/Sound Effects: nine value set, Bon; Creators: KANEDA, Takato Nishi; Co-Directors: Nobuhide Kikuchi, Yoshinobu Mino, Hiroki Fujimoto, Takayuki Hosonuma, Kazuomi Makita; Narrator: Yoshihiro Nakamura; Director: KANEDA	August 5, 2020	76 min.
Honto ni Atta! Noroi no Video 90	Executive Producers: Hajime Harie, Wataru Suzuki; Producers: Akira Harie, Shu Iwamura; Assistant Directors: Daisuke Ebara, Mayoshi Hirayama, Ryuto Takahashi; Music/Sound Effects: Jobanshi, Bon; Narrator: Yoshihiro Nakamura; Creator/Director: Kazuomi Makita	December 4, 2020	82 min.
Honto ni Atta! Noroi no Video: Toku Osore-hen	Executive Producers: Hajime Harie, Wataru Suzuki; Cooperation: Arisumi Okada (Family Gekijo); Producers: Akira Harie, Shu Iwamura; Assistant Directors: Daisuke Ebara, Mayoshi Hirayama, Ryuto Takahashi; Music/Sound Effects: Jobanshi, Bon; Co-Director: Nobuhide Kikuchi; Narrator: Yoshihiro Nakamura; Creator/Director: Kazuomi Makita	December 18, 2020 (TV); October 7, 2022 (DVD)	52 min.

=== 2021 ===
Title	Staff	Release Date(s)	Running Time
Honto ni Atta! Noroi no Video 91	Executive Producers: Hajime Harie, Wataru Suzuki; Producers: Akira Harie, Shu Iwamura; Assistant Directors: Daisuke Ebara, Mayoshi Hirayama; Music/Sound Effects: Bon, Jobanshi; Narrator: Yoshihiro Nakamura; Creator/Director: Kazuomi Makita	March 5, 2021	66 min.
Honto ni Atta! Noroi no Video 92	Executive Producers: Hajime Harie, Wataru Suzuki; Producers: Akira Harie, Shu Iwamura; Assistant Directors: Daisuke Ebara, Masami Nakamura, Karina Hisaki; Music/Sound Effects: Jobanshi, Bon; Co-Directors: Nobuhide Kikuchi, Hiroki Fujimoto; Narrator: Yoshihiro Nakamura; Creator/Director: Kazuomi Makita	July 7, 2021	60 min.
Honto ni Atta! Noroi no Video 93	Executive Producers: Hajime Harie, Wataru Suzuki; Producers: Akira Harie, Shu Iwamura; Assistant Directors: Daisuke Ebara, Masami Nakamura, Karina Hisaki; Music/Sound Effects: Jobanshi, Bon; Co-Directors: Nobuhide Kikuchi, Hiroki Fujimoto; Narrator: Yoshihiro Nakamura; Creator/Director: Kazuomi Makita	August 6, 2021	62 min.
Honto ni Atta! Noroi no Video 94	Executive Producers: Hajime Harie, Wataru Suzuki; Producers: Akira Harie, Shu Iwamura; Assistant Directors: Daisuke Ebara, Masami Nakamura, Karina Hisaki; Music/Sound Effects: Jobanshi, Bon; Co-Directors: Nobuhide Kikuchi, Hiroki Fujimoto; Narrator: Yoshihiro Nakamura; Creator/Director: Kazuomi Makita	October 6, 2021	89 min.

=== 2022 ===
Title	Staff	Release Date(s)	Running Time
Honto ni Atta! Noroi no Video 95	Executive Producers: Hajime Harie, Wataru Suzuki; Producers: Akira Harie, Shu Iwamura; Assistant Directors: Yuta Oga, Karina Hisaki; Music/Sound Effects: Bon; Co-Directors: Nobuhide Kikuchi, Kazuomi Makita; Narrator: Yoshihiro Nakamura; Creator/Director: Hiroki Fujimoto	March 9, 2022	78 min.
Honto ni Atta! Noroi no Video 96	Executive Producers: Hajime Harie, Wataru Suzuki; Producers: Akira Harie, Shu Iwamura; Assistant Directors: Yuta Oga, Karina Hisaki; Music/Sound Effects: Bon; Creators: Hiroki Fujimoto, Sho Tanaka; Narrator: Yoshihiro Nakamura; Director: Hiroki Fujimoto	June 8, 2022	78 min.
Honto ni Atta! Noroi no Video 97	Executive Producers: Hajime Harie, Wataru Suzuki; Producers: Akira Harie, Shu Iwamura; Assistant Directors: Yuta Oga, Karina Hisaki; Music/Sound Effects: Bon; Creators: Hiroki Fujimoto, Sho Tanaka; Co-Creator: Satoko Sekiguchi; Co-Director: Nobuhide Kikuchi; Narrator: Yoshihiro Nakamura; Director: Hiroki Fujimoto	July 6, 2022	71 min.
Honto ni Atta! Noroi no Video 98	Executive Producers: Hajime Harie, Wataru Suzuki; Producers: Akira Harie, Shu Iwamura; Assistant Directors: Yuta Oga, Karina Hisaki; Music/Sound Effects: Bon; Creators: Hiroki Fujimoto, Sho Tanaka; Co-Creator: Tokuya Niitsu; Co-Director: Nobuhide Kikuchi; Narrator: Yoshihiro Nakamura; Director: Hiroki Fujimoto	August 5, 2022	65 min.

=== 2023 ===
Title	Staff	Release Date(s)	Running Time
Honto ni Atta! Noroi no Video 99	Executive Producers: Hajime Harie, Wataru Suzuki; Producers: Akira Harie, Shu Iwamura; Assistant Directors: Yuta Oga, Maria Kise; Music/Sound Effects: Bon; Creators: Hiroki Fujimoto, Sho Tanaka; Co-Creator: Satoko Sekiguchi; Co-Directors: Nobuhide Kikuchi, Ryo Teranishi; Narrator: Yoshihiro Nakamura; Director: Hiroki Fujimoto	January 6, 2023	72 min.
Honto ni Atta! Noroi no Video 101	Executive Producers: Hajime Harie, Wataru Suzuki; Producers: Akira Harie, Shu Iwamura; Assistant Directors: Yuta Oga, Maria Kise, Rintaro Saito; Music/Sound Effects: Bon; Creators: Hiroki Fujimoto, Sho Tanaka; Co-Creator: Satoko Sekiguchi; Co-Director: Ryo Teranishi; Narrator: Yoshihiro Nakamura; Director: Hiroki Fujimoto	April 7, 2023	65 min.
Gekijō-ban: Honto ni Atta! Noroi no Video 100	Executive Producers: Hajime Harie, Wataru Suzuki; Producers: Akira Harie, Shu Iwamura; Camera: Shu Kawashima; Assistant Directors: Yuta Oga, Maria Kise, Karina Hisaki; Directing Assistants: Shingo Ishikawa, Ryoga Watanabe; Editor: Shingo Ishikawa; Music/Sound Effects: Bon; Sound Adjustment: Tomoki Aya, Rei Murakami; Mosaic Processing: Ryo Teranishi; Equipment Cooperation: Masaya Suzuki, Hosana Nishioka, Shuichi Kimura; Multi-Audio Studio: J-Force; Co-Director: Hiroki Fujimoto; Narrator/Creator/Director: Yoshihiro Nakamura	July 28, 2023 (Theaters); December 6, 2023 (DVD)	98 min.
Honto ni Atta! Noroi no Video 102	Executive Producers: Hajime Harie, Wataru Suzuki; Producers: Akira Harie, Shu Iwamura; Assistant Directors: Maria Kise, Sho Tanaka; Creators: Hiroki Fujimoto, Sho Tanaka; Co-Directors: Ryo Teranishi, Yoshinobu Mino, Nobuhide Kikuchi; Co-Creator: Satoko Sekiguchi; Music/Sound Effects: Bon; Narrator: Yoshihiro Nakamura; Director: Hiroki Fujimoto	August 4, 2023	76 min.
Honto ni Atta! Noroi no Video 103	Executive Producers: Hajime Harie, Wataru Suzuki; Producers: Akira Harie, Shu Iwamura; Assistant Directors: Maria Kise, Sho Tanaka; Creators: Hiroki Fujimoto, Sho Tanaka; Co-Directors: Ryo Teranishi, Ryoshinobu Mino, Nobuhide Kikuchi; Co-Creator: Satoko Sekiguchi; Co-Editor: Ryo Teranishi; Music/Sound Effects: Bon; Narrator: Yoshihiro Nakamura; Director: Hiroki Fujimoto	September 6, 2023	65 min.
Honto ni Atta! Noroi no Video 104	Executive Producers: Hajime Harie, Wataru Suzuki; Producers: Akira Harie, Shu Iwamura; Assistant Directors: Maria Kise, Sho Tanaka, Akari Kobayashi; Creators: Hiroki Fujimoto, Sho Tanaka; Co-Directors: Ryo Teranishi, Yoshinobu Mino, Nobuhide Kikuchi; Co-Creator: Satoko Sekiguchi; Co-Editor: Ryo Teranishi; Music/Sound Effects: Bon; Narrator: Yoshihiro Nakamura; Director: Hiroki Fujimoto	October 6, 2023	78 min.

=== 2024 ===
Title	Staff	Release Date(s)	Running Time
Honto ni Atta! Noroi no Video 105	Executive Producers: Hajime Harie, Wataru Suzuki; Producers: Akira Harie, Shu Iwamura; Assistant Directors: Yuta Oga, Maria Kise, Ryoga Watanabe; Co-Director: Nobuhide Kikuchi; Music/Sound Effects: Bon; Narrator: Yoshihiro Nakamura; Creator/Director: Hiroki Fujimoto	March 6, 2024	70 min.
Honto ni Atta! Noroi no Video 106	Executive Producers: Hajime Harie, Wataru Suzuki; Producers: Akira Harie, Shu Iwamura; Assistant Directors: Yuta Oga, Maria Kise, Yoshinobu Mino; Co-Director: Nobuhide Kikuchi; Co-Editor: Yoshinobu Mino; Music/Sound Effects: Bon; Narrator: Yoshihiro Nakamura; Creator/Director: Hiroki Fujimoto	June 5, 2024	65 min.
Honto ni Atta! Noroi no Video 107	Executive Producers: Hajime Harie, Wataru Suzuki; Producers: Akira Harie, Shu Iwamura; Assistant Directors: Yuta Oga, Maria Kise, Yoshinobu Mino; Co-Director: Nobuhide Kikuchi; Co-Editor: Tokuya Niitsu; Music/Sound Effects: Bon; Narrator: Yoshihiro Nakamura; Creator/Director: Hiroki Fujimoto	August 7, 2024	72 min.
Honto ni Atta! Noroi no Video 108	Executive Producers: Hajime Harie, Wataru Suzuki; Producers: Akira Harie, Shu Iwamura; Assistant Directors: Yuta Oga, Maria Kise, Yoshinobu Mino; Co-Director: Nobuhide Kikuchi; Co-Editor: Tokuya Niitsu; Music/Sound Effects: Bon; Narrator: Yoshihiro Nakamura; Creator/Director: Hiroki Fujimoto	August 7, 2024	77 min.
Gekijō-ban: Honto ni Atta! Noroi no Video 109	Executive Producers: Hajime Harie, Wataru Suzuki; Producers: Akira Harie, Shu Iwamura; Assistant Directors: Hiroki Fujimoto, Yuta Oga, Yoshinobu Mino; Investigation Cooperation: Maki Ichinose; Music/Sound Effects: Bon; Narrator: Yoshihiro Nakamura; Creator/Director: Nobuhide Kikuchi	November 8, 2024 (Theaters); December 6, 2024 (DVD)	100 min.

=== 2025 ===
Title	Staff	Release Date(s)	Running Time
Honto ni Atta! Noroi no Video 110	Executive Producers: Hajime Harie, Wataru Suzuki; Producers: Akira Harie, Shu Iwamura; Assistant Directors: Yuta Oga, Yoshinobu Mino; Co-Creator: Tokuya Niitsu; Co-Editor: Yoshinobu Mino; Music/Sound Effects: Bon; Narrator: Yoshihiro Nakamura; Creator/Director: Hiroki Fujimoto	March 7, 2025	81 min.
Honto ni Atta! Noroi no Video 111	Executive Producers: Hajime Harie, Wataru Suzuki; Producers: Akira Harie, Shu Iwamura; Assistant Directors: Yuta Oga, Yoshinobu Mino; Directing Assistant: Ten Seike; Camera: Yoshinobu Mino; Co-Creators: Yoshinobu Mino, Sho Tanaka; Co-Editor: Yoshinobu Mino; Music/Sound Effects: Bon; Narrator: Yoshihiro Nakamura; Creator/Director: Hiroki Fujimoto	July 4, 2025	71 min.
Honto ni Atta! Noroi no Video 112	Executive Producers: Hajime Harie, Wataru Suzuki; Producers: Akira Harie, Shu Iwamura; Assistant Directors: Yuta Oga, Yoshinobu Mino; Directing Assistant: Ten Seike; Camera: Yoshinobu Mino; Co-Creator/Co-Editor: Yoshinobu Mino; Music/Sound Effects: Bon; Narrator: Yoshihiro Nakamura; Creator/Director: Hiroki Fujimoto	August 6, 2025	68 min.
Honto ni Atta! Noroi no Video 113	Executive Producers: Hajime Harie, Wataru Suzuki; Producers: Akira Harie, Shu Iwamura; Assistant Directors: Yuta Oga, Yoshinobu Mino; Directing Assistant: Ten Seike; Camera: Yoshinobu Mino; Co-Creator/Co-Editor: Yoshinobu Mino; Music/Sound Effects: Bon; Narrator: Yoshihiro Nakamura; Creator/Director: Hiroki Fujimoto	September 5, 2025	84 min.

=== 2026 ===
Title	Staff	Release Date(s)	Running Time
Honto ni Atta! Noroi no Video 114	Executive Producers: Hajime Harie, Wataru Suzuki; Producers: Akira Harie, Shu Iwamura; Assistant Directors: Minoru Oshimi, Yuika Ono; Co-Director: Nobuhide Kikuchi; Music/Sound Effects: Bon; Narrator: Yoshihiro Nakamura; Creator/Director: Yoshinobu Mino	January 7, 2026	73 min.
Honto ni Atta! Noroi no Video 115	Executive Producers: Hajime Harie, Wataru Suzuki; Producers: Akira Harie, Shu Iwamura; Assistant Directors: Yuta Oga, Yoshinobu Mino, Maria Kise; Editor: Hiroki Fujimoto; Co-Editor: Yoshinobu Mino; Music/Sound Effects: Bon; Narrator: Yoshihiro Nakamura; Creator/Director: Hiroki Fujimoto	April 3, 2026	95 min.
Honto ni Atta! Noroi no Video 116	Executive Producers: Hajime Harie, Wataru Suzuki; Producers: Akira Harie, Shu Iwamura; Assistant Director: Yuki Miyata; Co-Director: Nobuhide Kikuchi; Directing Assistant: Ten Seike; Music/Sound Effects: Bon; Narrator: Yoshihiro Nakamura; Creator/Director: Yoshinobu Mino	August 5, 2026	69 min.
Honto ni Atta! Noroi no Video 117	Executive Producers: Hajime Harie, Wataru Suzuki; Producers: Akira Harie, Shu Iwamura; Assistant Directors: Yuki Miyata, Takuma Komeya; Co-Director: Nobuhide Kikuchi; Directing Assistant: Ten Seike; Music/Sound Effects: Bon; Narrator: Yoshihiro Nakamura; Creator/Director: Yoshinobu Mino	September 2, 2026	64 min.
Honto ni Atta! Noroi no Video 118	Executive Producers: Hajime Harie, Wataru Suzuki; Producers: Akira Harie, Shu Iwamura; Assistant Directors: Yuki Miyata, Takuma Komeya; Co-Director: Nobuhide Kikuchi; Directing Assistant: Ten Seike; Music/Sound Effects: Bon; Narrator: Yoshihiro Nakamura; Creator/Director: Yoshinobu Mino	October 7, 2026	72 min.

=== Best Selections ===
- Honto ni Atta! Noroi no Video: Best Selection DVD Box contains carefully selected 12 segments.
- Honto ni Atta! Noroi no Video: Saikyō no Jubaku-hen DVD Box contains carefully selected 13 segments.
- Honto ni Atta! Noroi no Video: Saikyō Eizō Gensen-ban DVD Box Book contains carefully selected 15 segments.
- Honto ni Atta! Noroi no Video: Kowa Sugiru DVD Book contains carefully selected 17 segments.
- Honto ni Atta! Noroi no Video: Kyōfu no Saian Kakaku DVD Book contains carefully selected 12 segments.

Title	Staff	Release Date(s)	Running Time
Honto ni Atta! Noroi no Video: Best Selection 1	Executive Producers: Hajime Harie, Wataru Suzuki; Producers: Natsuko Kitani, Takafumi Ohashi; Creators: Yoshihiro Nakamura, Kenichi Suzuki; Staff: Kenji Osaku, Madoka Watanabe, Hisashi Imai, Nao Kanbayashi, Tomoo Fukatsu, Ayako Iguchi, Satoshi Daikichi, Toshiyuki Waki; Music: Tomohiro Harada; Narrators: Yoshihiro Nakamura, Masaki Takahashi – Bonus Videos – Creator/Editor: Futoshi Kondo; Co-Editor: Kazuyuki Sakamoto	July 26, 2002	49 min.
Honto ni Atta! Noroi no Video: Best Selection 2	Executive Producers: Hajime Harie, Wataru Suzuki; Producers: Natsuko Kitani, Takafumi Ohashi; Creators: Yoshihiro Nakamura, Kenichi Suzuki; Staff: Kenji Osaku, Madoka Watanabe, Hisashi Imai, Nao Kanbayashi, Tomoo Fukatsu, Ayako Iguchi, Satoshi Daikichi, Toshiyuki Waki; Music: Tomohiro Harada; Narrators: Yoshihiro Nakamura, Masaki Takahashi – Bonus Videos – Creator/Editor: Futoshi Kondo; Co-Editor: Kazuyuki Sakamoto	July 26, 2002	50 min.
Honto ni Atta! Noroi no Video: Best Selection 3	Executive Producers: Hajime Harie, Wataru Suzuki; Producers: Natsuko Kitani, Takafumi Ohashi; Creators: Yoshihiro Nakamura, Kenichi Suzuki; Staff: Kenji Osaku, Madoka Watanabe, Hisashi Imai, Nao Kanbayashi, Tomoo Fukatsu, Ayako Iguchi, Satoshi Daikichi, Toshiyuki Waki; Music: Tomohiro Harada; Narrators: Yoshihiro Nakamura, Masaki Takahashi – Bonus Videos – Creator/Editor: Futoshi Kondo; Co-Editor: Kazuyuki Sakamoto	July 26, 2002	55 min.
Honto ni Atta! Noroi no Video: Best Selection DVD Box	Creators/Directors: Kazuyuki Sakamoto, Yohei Fukuda, Kazuto Kodama	May 27, 2010	102 min.
Honto ni Atta! Noroi no Video: Saikyō no Jubaku-hen DVD Box	Creators/Directors: Kazuyuki Sakamoto, Yohei Fukuda, Kazuto Kodama	May 24, 2011	126 min.
Honto ni Atta! Noroi no Video: Saikyō Eizō Gensen-ban DVD Box Book	Creators/Directors: Tonshu Takeshima, Yohei Fukuda, Kazuto Kodama, Hiroki Iwasawa	July 16, 2013	120 min.
Honto ni Atta! Noroi no Video: Kowa Sugiru DVD Book	Creators/Directors: Yohei Fukuda, Kazuto Kodama, Hiroki Iwasawa	July 28, 2014	122 min.
Honto ni Atta! Noroi no Video: Kyōfu no Saian Kakaku DVD Book	Creators/Directors: Tetsuaki Matsue, Kazuto Kodama, Hiroki Iwasawa	June 29, 2015	92 min.
Honto ni Atta! Noroi no Video: Best 10	Executive Producers: Hajime Harie, Wataru Suzuki; Producers: Shoei Miyata, Shu Iwamura; Photography Cooperation: Yuji Nishikawa, Ryunosuke Oyakawa; Title Director: Hiroki Fujimoto; Music: Bon; Narrators: Yoshihiro Nakamura, Masaki Takahashi (uncredited); Creators/Directors: Yoshihiro Nakamura, Kenichi Suzuki, Kazuyuki Sakamoto, Yohei Fukuda, Kazuto Kodama, Hiroki Iwasawa, Nobuhide Kikuchi, Kotaro Terauchi	November 3, 2018	80 min.
Honto ni Atta! Noroi no Video: Best of Best	Creators/Directors: Kazuyuki Sakamoto, Yohei Fukuda, Kazuto Kodama, Hiroki Iwasawa, Nobuhide Kikuchi	March 20, 2020	80 min.

=== DVD Boxes ===
- Honto ni Atta! Noroi no Video: Best Selection DVD-Box includes Best Selections 1–3.
- Honto ni Atta! Noroi no Video: Perfect DVD Box 1 includes 1–8 and Special 1–5.
- Honto ni Atta! Noroi no Video: Perfect DVD Box 2 includes 9–16 and Ver. X: 1–4
- Honto ni Atta! Noroi no Video: Perfect DVD Box 3 includes 17–25, The Movie, The Movie 2, Ring-hen, and Senritsu Tōkō Best 20.
- Honto ni Atta! Noroi no Video: Perfect DVD Box 4 includes 26–38.
- Honto ni Atta! Noroi no Video: Perfect DVD Box 5 includes 39–51.
- Honto ni Atta! Noroi no Video: Perfect DVD Box 6 includes 52–64.
- Honto ni Atta! Noroi no Video: Perfect DVD Box 7 includes 65–77.
- Honto ni Atta! Noroi no Video: Perfect DVD Box 8 includes 78–90.
- Honto ni Atta! Noroi no Video: Perfect DVD Box 9 includes 91-100.

Title	Staff	Release Date(s)	Running Time
Honto ni Atta! Noroi no Video: Best Selection DVD-Box	Executive Producers: Hajime Harie, Wataru Suzuki; Producers: Natsuko Kitani, Takafumi Ohashi; Creators: Yoshihiro Nakamura, Kenichi Suzuki; Staff: Kenji Osaku, Madoka Watanabe, Hisashi Imai, Nao Kanbayashi, Tomoo Fukatsu, Ayako Iguchi, Satoshi Daikichi, Toshiyuki Waki; Music: Tomohiro Harada; Narrators: Yoshihiro Nakamura, Masaki Takahashi – Bonus Videos – Creator/Editor: Futoshi Kondo; Co-Editor: Kazuyuki Sakamoto	July 26, 2002	154 min. (in total)
Honto ni Atta! Noroi no Video: Perfect DVD Box 1	Creators/Directors: Yoshihiro Nakamura, Kenichi Suzuki, Tetsuaki Matsue, Futoshi Kondo, Kazuyuki Sakamoto	June 8, 2007	794 min. (in total)
Honto ni Atta! Noroi no Video: Perfect DVD Box 2	Creators/Directors: Yujiro Kokonoe, Tetsuaki Matsue, Koji Shiraishi, Kazuyuki Sakamoto, Yohei Fukuda	July 6, 2007	797 min. (in total)
Honto ni Atta! Noroi no Video: Perfect DVD Box 3	Creators/Directors: Futoshi Kondo, Kazuyuki Sakamoto, Koji Shiraishi, Kiyoshi Yamamoto, Yohei Fukuda, Kazuto Kodama	August 3, 2007	948 min. (in total)
Honto ni Atta! Noroi no Video: Perfect DVD Box 4	Creator/Director: Kazuto Kodama	August 6, 2010	802 min. (in total)
Honto ni Atta! Noroi no Video: Perfect DVD Box 5	Creators/Directors: Kazuto Kodama, Hiroki Iwasawa	March 2, 2013	850 min. (in total)
Honto ni Atta! Noroi no Video: Perfect DVD Box 6	Creators/Directors: Hiroki Iwasawa, Nobuhide Kikuchi	March 2, 2013	938 min. (in total)
Honto ni Atta! Noroi no Video: Perfect DVD Box 7	Creators/Directors: Nobuhide Kikuchi, Yohei Fukuda, Kotaro Terauchi, Naomi Kawai	August 3, 2018	1100 min. (in total)
Honto ni Atta! Noroi no Video: Perfect DVD Box 8	Creators/Directors: Naomi Kawai, Yohei Fukuda, KANEDA, Kazuomi Makita	January 8, 2021	976 min. (in total)
Honto ni Atta! Noroi no Video: Perfect DVD Box 9	Creators/Directors: Kazuomi Makita, Hiroki Fujimoto, Yoshihiro Nakamura	March 7, 2025	739 min. (in total)

== See also ==
- Kaiki! Unbelievable - A video series also produced by NSW and Pal Entertainments Group that features ghost photos. There is no connection with the Fuji Television program Kiseki Taiken! Unbelievable, which also features ghost photos.
- Hontō ni Atta Kowai Hanashi - A video series also produced by NSW and Pal Entertainments Group that features dramatizations of stories based on real-life supernatural experiences and urban legends. There is no connection between the horror manga published by Asahi Shimbun Publications or the Fuji Television drama Honto ni Atta Kowai Hanashi.
- Ring (film)
- Noroi: The Curse
- Faces of Death
