= Mai Nishida =

Japanese gravure idol and tarento

- 西田 麻衣
- Born: March 23, 1989 (age 37); Yawata, Kyoto, Japan
- Other names: Maipu (まいぷぅ); Maipurin (まいぷりん)
- Occupations: Gravure idol, tarento, actress
- Years active: 2006–
- Agent: Space Craft
- Known for: Gravure idol
- Height: 1.58 m (5 ft 2 in) (2012)

Mai Nishida (西田 麻衣, Nishida Mai; born March 23, 1989, in Yawata, Kyoto, Japan) is a Japanese gravure idol, tarento, and actress represented by Space Craft.

== Biography ==
In 2006, Nishida was awarded the Grand Prix prize of Space Craft Group's "Mizugi Gravure Audition" among 3,152 people. Her gravure debut was on Weekly Young Sunday and was chosen as the 2006 Miss of the second semester in the YS Maiden Academy.

Nishida served as an image model for the fashion brand KIKS TYO.

== Filmography ==
=== TV series ===
Year	Title	Network	Notes
	Negima! Magister Negi Magi	TV Tokyo	
	Rank Oukoku	TBS	
	Beach Angels	TBS	
2010	Owarai Wide Show Marco Porori!	KTV	Guest
2010	Unbelievable	Fuji TV	
2010	Jishaku no Kētai Hunter	TVK	
2010	London Hearts	TV Asahi	
2010	Goddotan	TV Tokyo	
2010	Ichihachi	MBS	
2010	Wakeari Bungee		
2010	Uta Sera	TUY	
2011	Quiz! Shinsuke-kun	ABC	
2011	Megami Kōrin	Mondo TV	
2012	Bakuretsu Variety Shabadaba no Sora ni	KTV	
2015	Do S Deka	NTV	Episode 2

=== Radio series ===
Title	Network	Notes
Ginga ni Hoero! Uchū G-men Takuya	NBS	
Ken Shimura no First Stage	JFN	
Matamata Gocha Maze!	MBS Radio	
Mata × 3 Gocha Maze!	MBS Radio	
Gocha Maze!	MBS Radio	
Gocha Maze! Kayōbi	MBS Radio	

=== Advertisements ===
Year	Title	Notes
2010	Morinaga & Company Amazake	
2011	Suntory Ginmugi "Hormone"	
2012	Glico Dororich Girls	

=== Internet series ===
Title	Network	Notes
Ura su Tacha: Ninoashi	Oh!sama TV	Guest

=== Mobile series ===
Title	Network	Notes
Radio Nanoni Nande Mizugi ni Naranakutcha Ikenaindesu ka!?	Mobile 1242	

=== Music videos ===
Title	Notes
Breakerz "Grand Finale"	

=== Films ===
Year	Title	Role	Notes
2009	Teketeke	Ayahana Sekiguchi	
2009	Gurakin Queen	Marin	Lead role
2010	Coach: 40-sai no Figure Skater	Azusa Yunagi	
2010	Kyōto Uzumasa Monogatari		
2013	Momoi Sora o	Mai	
2013	Tokyo Family		
