= Occult (film) =

- Original theatrical release poster
- Directed by: Kōji Shiraishi
- Screenplay by: Kōji Shiraishi
- Based on: Inspired by the works of H. P. Lovecraft
- Produced by: Yukiyasu Shimada; Tadashi Yamamoto
- Starring: Mika Azuma; Horiken; Kōen Kondō
- Cinematography: Kōji Shiraishi
- Edited by: Kōji Shiraishi
- Music by: Masaya Nakahara
- Production companies: Creative Axa Company Ltd.; Image Rings
- Distributed by: Creative Axa Company Ltd.; Image Rings
- Release date: February 28, 2009 (Japan)
- Running time: 110 minutes
- Country: Japan
- Language: Japanese

Occult (Japanese: オカルト, Hepburn: Okaruto) is a 2009 "found footage" J-horror film in the form of a documentary. The movie was written and directed by Kōji Shiraishi.

== Plot ==
In 2005, a man named Ken Matsuki killed two people and injured a third in a mass stabbing before jumping off a cliff; his body was never found. Three years later, a documentary film crew led by Kōji Shiraishi began a project chronicling the aftermath of the incident and interviewing survivors. One of them, Shohei Eno, is an unemployed man who had a strange petroglyph-like symbol carved into his back by Matsuki. To the crew's surprise, Eno states that he is thankful that Matsuki stabbed him as, in the aftermath, he has experienced "miracles", such as UFO sightings and disembodied voices. He further claims that he was given a mandate by Matsuki to perform a "ceremony" which he believes was the motive for the mass stabbing. Seeing that Eno is financially troubled, the crew agrees to let him live in their offices and pay him on the condition that they are allowed to film the phenomena he witnesses.

Shiraishi's crew comes to be repulsed by Eno, especially since they think that he will follow Matsuki's path of mass murder. From Matsuki's father, the crew learns that Eno's symbol resembles the birthmark possessed by Matsuki since childhood. Their search brings them to Kutoro Rock (九頭呂岩, literally "Nine-Headed Spine Rock"), a formation at the peak of Mount Ohiruyama, where Shiraishi had a bizarre experience the same day as the mass stabbing in which leeches appeared on his leg. There, the crew finds a stone with Matsuki and Eno's petroglyph symbols inscribed on it. According to horror film director Kiyoshi Kurosawa, Kutoro Rock was dedicated to Hiruko, a Japanese god with the form of a leech. Meanwhile, the film Eno shoots following his daily routine reveals that the "UFOs" he sees are, in fact, leech-like apparitions that appear in the skies above Tokyo.

Shiraishi takes Eno to a restaurant to get him to talk openly about what the voices tell him to do. Drunk and relaxed, Eno reveals that he has been saving ¥700,000 to build a bomb so he can commit a suicide bombing in a busy street in Shibuya. He claims that the bomb will send him and his victims to Hiruko's realm, a place he likens to paradise. Shiraishi resolves to stop Eno, but on the way home he sees Eno's head surrounded by the leech-like apparitions and finds his leg bleeding as it did when the leeches bit it. Shiraishi reluctantly cooperates, intending to record Eno's plot for posterity. After spending a day together prior to the bombing, Eno offers him a ¥100 coin to repay one he borrowed earlier. Shiraishi instead asks him to return it and the camera from the realm he expects to go to as proof his plan succeeded. The blast ended up claiming 108 lives, including a member of Shiraishi's film crew. Eno's body, like Matsuki's, is never found. Shiraishi, meanwhile, is sentenced to prison for complicity.

After 21 years, Shiraishi is released from prison and reunites with his producer. They return to the restaurant, where Eno's camera and the ¥100 coin fall from the ceiling. The footage inside the camera shows Eno and his victims being tormented by leech and jellyfish-like creatures in a nightmarish, Lovecraftian realm which Eno screams is Hell.

== Cast ==
- Mika Azuma
- Horiken
- Kōen Kondō
- Kiyoshi Kurosawa

== See also ==
- The Curse (2005), another "found footage" mockumentary by the same director
- Shirome (2010), another "found footage" mockumentary by the same director
- Chō Akunin (2011), another "found footage" film by the same director
