= Unnamed Footage Festival =

Annual found footage film festival

The Unnamed Footage Festival, also known as UFF, and the Unnamed Footage Film Festival, is an annual film festival held at the Balboa Theatre in San Francisco. Founded in 2018 by Russell Fisher, the founder of blog/podcast "The Overlook Theatre", the festival screens feature and short films that fit broadly in the found footage film subgenre, most notably found footage horror and faux documentary. It is the only fully found footage horror film festival in America.

== History ==
The festival was established in 2018 by Russell Fisher, Oksana Osachiy, Randy Staat, and Clark Little, who partnered with Madeleine Koestner of the Philadelphia Unnamed Film Festival. The initial description of the festival read, "The Unnamed Footage Festival will be a two day film festival showcasing features along with various short films, all in the genre of found footage horror, first person cinema, and faux documentary."

The first event ran for two days, from March 24 to March 25 with little fanfare. UFF returned in 2019 from February 21 to February 23, now sponsored by Severin Films and featuring a 20th anniversary screening of The Blair Witch Project. The festival has currently run for 9 editions, with the most recent being in March 2026. By 2023, UFF began garnering recognition from sites with bigger coverage, such as Bloody Disgusting and Rue Morgue Magazine, who began covering the festival annually following its 6th edition, with Fangoria and Dread Central beginning to recognize the festival in 2026. Over time, the scope of films and shorts accepted to UFF has widened, now including, "Found Footage Horror, Faux Documentary, POV Cinema, Screenlife, ARG, and Hybrid Found Footage".

In 2021, UFF was done virtually due to the COVID-19 pandemic in the form of a 24-hour livestream, labelled "Unnamed Footage Festival 24HR", or simply "#UFF24HR". Since then, UFF has had multiple virtual components, including a livestream for UFF5 and most notably, the creation of UFF24HR, an annual 24-hour livestream that takes place in the Fall. The UFF24HR lineup often includes films that played at UFF previously and occasionally ones that haven't, such as UFF24HR24 (the second annual edition of the livestream) hosting the virtual world premiere of Leech directed by David M. Dawson. Since 2023 (UFF666), UFF has been partnering with Alamo Drafthouse to host pre-festival screenings at the San Francisco location.

== Festival Lineups ==
This information was sourced from the Unnamed Footage Festival website as it is not fully available anywhere else, but it is confirmed by Bloody Disgusting and other news outlets such as ScreenAnarchy.

=== UFF ===
==== 2018 ====
The 2018 festival took place from March 24 to March 25.

- Cold Ground (Fabien Delage, France, 2017)
- The Next Big Thing (Brody Gusar, US, 2016)
- Butterfly Kisses (Erik Kristopher Myers, US, 2018)
- Descent Into Darkness: My European Nightmare (Rafael Cherkaski, France, 2012)
- Unfriended (Levan Gabriadze, US, 2014)
- Long Pigs (Chris Power & Nathan Hynes, Canada, 2007)
- Boots on the Ground (Louis Melville, UK, 2017)
- Be My Cat: A Film For Anne (Adrian Țofei, Romania, 2015)
- The Road Movie (Dmitry Kalashnikov, Belarus/Russia/Serbia, 2016)
- The Triangle (David Blair, Nathaniel Peterson, Adam Pitman, Andrew Rizzo, & Adam Stilwell, US, 2016)
- #Screamers (Dean Matthew Ronalds, US, 2016)
- WNUF Halloween Special (Chris LaMartina, US, 2013)

==== 2019 ====
The 2019 festival took place from February 21 to February 23.

- Butterfly Kisses (Erik Kristopher Myers, US, 2018)
- Paranormal Activity 2: Tokyo Night (Toshikazu Nagae, Japan, 2010)
- The Midnight Swim (Sarah Adina Smith, US, 2015)
- Night Trip (Matthew Levin, US, 1993)
- The Blair Witch Project (Daniel Myrick & Eduardo Sanchez, US, 1999)
- El Sanatorio (Miguel Gomez, Costa Rica, 2010)
- La Llorona Investigation: Her Cry (Damir Catic, US, 2019)
- Webcast (Paul McGhie, UK, 2016)
- The Moose Head Over the Mantel (Jessi Gotta, Bryan Enk, & Stephanie Cox-Williams, US, 2018)
- Drib (Kristoffer Borgli, US/Norway, 2017)
- Antrum: The Deadliest Film Ever Made (Michael Laicini & David Amito, US, 2018)
- Followed (Antoine Le, US, 2018)
- Murder Box (Gerald Varga, Canada, 2018)

==== 2020 (UFF3) ====
The 2020 festival took place from February 27 to March 1.

- The Fear Footage 2: Curse of the Tape (Ricky Umberger, US, 2020)
- The Fear Footage (Ricky Umberger, US, 2018)
- Maniac (Franck Khalfoun, US, 2012)
- Lensface (Travis Nicholas Zariwny, US, 2020)
- Feral (Andrés Kaiser, Mexico, 2020)
- Skyman (Daniel Myrick, US, 2020)
- Phony (David Bush, US, 2020)
- Murder Death Koreatown (Anonymous, US, 2020)
- The Lost Footage of Leah Sullivan (Burt Grinstead, US, 2019)
- The Lock In (Beverly Banks, US, 2014)
- Noroi: The Curse (Koji Shiraishi, Japan, 2005)
- Fraud (Dean Fleischer-Camp, US, 2016)
- They're Inside (John-Paul Panelli, US, 2019)
- Peeping Tommy (James Schmitz, US, 2019)
- UFO Abduction (Dean Alioto, US 1989)
- A Record of Sweet Murder (Koji Shiraishi, Japan, 2014)
- Head Case (Anthony Spadaccini, US, 2007)

==== 2021 (UFF24HR) ====
The 2021 festival took place on March 26 in the form of a 24-hour livestream.

- I Blame Society (Gillian Wallace Horvat, US, 2020)
- 1974: La Posesion de Altair (Victor Dryere, Mexico, 2016)
- Space Clown (Graham Skipper, US, 2016)
- Long Pigs (Chris Power & Nathan Hynes, Canada, 2007)
- Charlotte's Net (James Dobbins Jones, Australia, 2021)
- Dwellers (Drew Fortier, US, 2021)
- Holy Shit That Was Scary 3: The Cloud (Colin Johnson, US, 2021)
- The Flower Tapes (Sean Beagan, US, 2020)
- 0's and 1's (Eugene Kotlyarenko, US, 2011)
- Descent Into Darkness: My European Nightmare (Rafael Cherkaski, France, 2012)
- Murder Death Koreatown (Anonymous, US, 2020)
- The Video Diary of Madi O, Final Entries (Harold Brodie, New Zealand, 2012)

==== 2022 (UFF5) ====
The 2022 festival took place from March 17 to March 20.

- Behind The Mask: The Rise Of Leslie Vernon (Scott Glosserman, US, 2006)
- Bad Ben 7: Haunted Highway (Nigel Bach, 2019)
- Base (Richard Perry, US, 2017)
- Masking Threshold (Johannes Grenzfurthner, Austria, 2021)
- FTW (Jorge Torres-Torres, US, 2010)
- Curse of Aurore (Mehran C. Torgoley, Canada, 2021)
- He's Watching (Jacob Aaron Estes, US, 2022)
- The Collingswood Story (Mike Costanza, US, 2002)
- The Outwaters (Robbie Banfitch, US, 2022)
- The Backrooms (Kane Pixels, US, 2022)
- The Zand Order (Sarah Goras Peterson, US, 2021)
- The Gerber Syndrome: Il Contagio (Maxì Dejoie, Italy, 2011)
- Wesens (Derick Muller, South Africa, 2020)
- Putrefixion A Video Of Nina Temich (David Torres, US, 2022)
- DEADWARE (Isaac Rodriguez, US, 2021)
- Malibu Horror Story (Scott Sloane, US, 2021)
- The Alien Report (Patrick Donnelly, US, 2021)
- My Inner Demon: A Geraldson Tale (Gerald Varga, US, 2022)

==== 2023 (UFF666) ====
The 2023 festival took place from March 23 to March 26.

- Mean Spirited (Jeff Ryan, US, 2022)
- Razzennest (Johannes Grenzfurthner, Austria, 2022)
- Tinsman Road (Robbie Banfitch, US, 2021) - WORK IN PROGRESS CUT
- Paranormal Activity (Oren Peli, US, 2007)
- R#J (Carey Williams, US, 2021)
- What is Buried Must Remain (Elias Matar, US, 2023)
- #ChadGetsTheAxe (Travis Bible, US, 2023)
- Tontine (Ezna Sands, US, 2010)
- Safe Word (Kôji Shiraishi, Japan, 2022)
- The Gulf of Silence (Mina Rhodes, US, 2020)
- Sex House (The Onion, US, 2012)
- The Tunnel: The Other Side of the Darkness (Adrian Nugent, Australia, 2023)
- The Tunnel (Carlo Ledesma, Australia, 2011)
- Invoking Yell (Patricio Valladares, Chile, 2023)
- Everybody Dies by the End (Ian Tripp & Ryan Schafer, US, 2022)
- Horror in the High Desert 2: Minerva (Dutch Marich, US, 2022)

In addition, UFF666 hosted a screening of Cloverfield at the nearby Alamo Drafthouse Cinema on March 22.

==== 2024 (UFF7) ====
The 2024 festival took place from March 28 to March 31.

- Hunting for the Hag (Paul A. Brooks, US, 2024)
- NIAS (Baptiste Rambaud, US, 2024)
- Puzzle Box (Jack Dignan, Australia, 2024)
- Tahoe Joe 2: The Nevada Bigfoot Conspiracy (Dillon Brown & Michael Rock, US, 2024)
- Frogman (Anthony Cousins, US, 2024)
- It Doesn't Get Any Better Than This (Rachel Kempf & Nick Toti, US, 2023)
- Flesh Games (David M. Dawson, US, 2023)
- Trash Humpers (Harmony Korine, US, 2009)
- Looky-Loo (Jason Zink, US, 2024)
- #Blue_Whale (Anna Zaytseva, Russia, 2023)
- Do Not Watch (Justin Janowitz, US, 2023)
- Cuddly Toys (Kansas Bowling, US, 2023)
- Project Eerie (Ricky Umberger, US, 2023)
- Haunted Ulster Live (Dominic O'Neill, US, 2023)
- The Coldness (Gustavo Sampaio, US, 2024)
- Jeffrey's Hell (Aaron Irons, US, 2024)
- In Memorium (Amanda Gusack, US, 2005)
- Mind Body Spirit (Alex Henes & Matthew Merenda, US, 2023)
- Livescreamers (Michelle Iannantuono, US, 2023)
- Horror in the High Desert 3: Firewatch (Dutch Marich, US, 2024)

In addition, UFF7 hosted a screening of As Above, So Below at the nearby Alamo Drafthouse Cinema on March 26 and a sneak peek at the "Detective Audio Version" of The Outwaters on March 27 at the Artists' Television Access.

==== 2025 (UFF8) ====
The 2025 festival took place from March 26 to March 30.

- Dream Eater (Alex Lee Williams, Jay Drakulic, & Mallory Drumm, Canada, 2024)
- What I Remember (Alex Hera, US, 2025)
- The Rebrand (Kaye Adelaide, Canada, 2024)
- Tinsman Road (Robbie Banfitch, US, 2025)
- Dooba Dooba (Ehrland Hollingsworth, US, 2024)
- The Unsolved Love Hotel Murder Case Incident (Dave Jackson & Guy, Japan, 2024)
- Distort (Richard Waters, Ireland, 2025)
- Baleful (Denman Hatch, Canada, 2024)
- Leech (David M. Dawson, US, 2024)
- Solvent (Johannes Grenzfurthner, Austria, 2024)
- It Doesn't Get Any Better Than This (Rachel Kempf & Nick Toti, US, 2023)
- I Don't Like it Here (Robbie Smith, US, 2025)
- The Lost Episode (Nick Wernham, Canada, 2024)
- Reality Killers (Alessandro Capone, Pablo Dammicco, Volfango De Biasi, & Francesco Maria Dominedò, Italy, 2005)
- Nightfall: A Paranormal Investigation (Myles McEwen & Ripley Stevens, Australia, 2024)
- McCurdy Point (Jeremy Brothers & Nick Paonessa, US, 2024)
- Fat Tuesday (Jorge Torres-Torres, US, 2018)
- Hunting Matthew Nichols (Markian Tarasiuk, Canada, 2024)
- What Happened to Dorothy Bell (Danny Villanueva, US, 2024)
- Souvenir (Dustin Tamplen, US, 2025)
- The Ruck March (Michael Rock, US, 2025)

In addition, UFF8 hosted a screening of Noroi: The Curse at the nearby Alamo Drafthouse Cinema on March 25 and a special screening of The Blair Witch Project hosted by Rachel Kempf & Nick Toti.

==== 2026 (UFF9) ====
The 2026 festival took place from March 24 to March 29.

- Bodycam (Brandon Christensen, Canada, 2025)
- Invoking Scream (Patricio Valladares, Chile, 2026) - EARLY CUT
- Heritage (Baptist Agostini-Croce, France, 2026)
- Welcome Back To My Channel (Jorrden Daley, Australia, 2026)
- Alan At Night (Jesse Swanson, US, 2026)
- Big City Pizza (Dusty Saunders, US, 2026)
- GroupChat (Dan Brownlie, UK, 2026)
- American Guinea Pig: Slaughter of the Swine (Stephen Biro & Eric Fox, US, 2026)
- Distort 2: The Dead Among The Trees (Richard Waters, Ireland, 2026)
- looky-loo: PART II (Jason Zink, US, 2026)
- We Put the World to Sleep (Adrian Țofei, Romania/Turkey, 2026)
- Primal Darkness (Dillon Brown, US, 2026)
- Frogman Returns (Anthony Cousins, US, 2025)
- The Killing Cell (Karsen Schovajsa & James Bessey, US, 2026)
- 39 (Gary Sherman, US, 2026)
- Wilderness Tapes (Brandon Walker, US, 2026)
- This House Is Totally Haunted (Sean Nichols Lynch, US, 2026)
- CONTENT (Adam Meilech, US, 2026)
- INFIRMARY (Nicholas Pineda, US, 2026)
- Zebra Hooves (David M. Dawson, US, 2026)
- Saming (Rungroj Rojanachotikul, UK, 2026)
- Florida, Man (Evan Jordan, US, 2026)
- Don't Look In The Dark (Samuel Freeman, US, 2026)
- The Devil's Teardrop (Gonzalo Otero, Peru, 2026)

In addition, UFF9 hosted a screening of The Sacrament at the nearby Alamo Drafthouse Cinema on March 24.

=== UFF24HR ===
==== 2022 (UFF5: Virtual) ====
- The Andy Baker Tape (Bret Lada, US, 2021
- Landlocked (Paul Owens, US, 2021)
- Horror in the High Desert (Dutch Marich, US, 2021)
- Chest (Aaron Irons, US, 2022)
- Duyster (Thomas Vanbrabant & Jordi Ostir, Belgium, 2021)
- The Barbados Project (Stockton Miller & Thomas Burke, Barbados, 2022)
- Last Radio Call (Isaac Rodriguez, US, 2022)

== Awards ==
Every feature and short film that plays at the in-person edition of UFF is automatically submitted to a competition, with six awards being decided by the festival's jury and the final two being voted on by the audience.

=== Awards Categories ===
- Jury Award
  - Best Feature
  - Best Short
  - Best Editing
  - Best Cast
  - Best Cinematography
  - Best Directing
- Audience Award
  - Best Feature
  - Best Short

=== Award Winners ===
[Missing information from 2019 to 2021, and 2023]

==== 2018 ====
- Jury Award for Best Feature
  - Be My Cat: A Film For Anne

==== 2022 ====
- Festival Award for Best Ensemble
  - Curse of Aurore
- Jury Award for Best Cinematography
  - Putrefixion: A Video of Nina Temich
- Jury Award for Best Director:
  - Derick Muller (Wesens)
- Jury Award for Best Editing:
  - Masking Threshold
- Jury Award for Best Feature:
  - The Outwaters
- Jury Award for Best Short:
  - The Backrooms (Found Footage)
- Audience Award for Best Feature:
  - Putrefixion: A Video of Nina Temich
- Audience Award for Best Short:
  - Filtered
- Founders Award
  - My Inner Demon: A Geraldson Tale

==== 2024 ====
- Jury Award for Best Cast
  - Flesh Games
- Jury Award for Best Cinematography
  - #Blue_Whale
- Jury Award for Best Director
  - Dutch Marich (Horror in the High Desert 3: Firewatch)
- Jury Award for Best Editing
  - Livescreamers
- Jury Award for Best Feature
  - Horror in the High Desert 3: Firewatch
- Jury Award for Best Short
  - Beholder
- Founders Award
  - It Doesn't Get Any Better Than This

==== 2025 ====
- Jury Award for Best Cast
  - McCurdy Point
- Jury Award for Best Cinematography
  - Nightfall: A Paranormal Investigation
- Jury Award for Best Director
  - Robbie Banfitch (Tinsman Road)
- Jury Award for Best Editing
  - I Don't Like It Here
- Jury Award for Best Feature
  - The Rebrand
- Jury Award for Best Short
  - Devil's Prism
- Audience Award for Best Feature
  - Hunting Matthew Nichols (Tied)
  - McCurdy Point (Tied)
- Founders Award
  - What I Remember

==== 2026 ====
- Jury Award for Best Cast
  - Alan at Night
- Jury Award for Best Cinematography
  - Infirmary
- Jury Award for Best Director
  - Dusty Saunders (Big City Pizza)
- Jury Award for Best Editing
  - CONTENT
- Jury Award for Best Feature
  - The Killing Cell
- Jury Award for Best Performance
  - Duru Yücel (We Put the World to Sleep)
- Jury Award for Best SFX
  - Frogman Returns
- Jury Award for Most Innovative Film
  - Don't Look in the Dark
- Audience Award for Best Feature
  - Frogman Returns
- Audience Award for Best Short
  - The Dark Watchers
