= Eugene Kotlyarenko =

Ukrainian-American director, writer, producer and actor

- Born: 1986 (age 39–40); Odesa, Ukrainian Soviet Socialist Republic, USSR
- Education: Columbia University
- Occupations: Film director; Producer; Actor
- Years active: 2010–present
- Notable work: 0s & 1s; A Wonderful Cloud; Wobble Palace; Spree

Eugene Kotlyarenko (Ukrainian: Євген Котляренко) (born 1986) is a Ukrainian-American film director, screenwriter, producer, and actor. His feature writing-directing work includes 0s & 1s (2011), A Wonderful Cloud (2015), Wobble Palace (2018), We Are (2020) and Spree (2020).

== Early life ==
Kotlyarenko was born in Odesa to a Jewish-Ukrainian family. He grew up in Brighton Beach, Brooklyn and on Long Island, attending Columbia University before moving to Los Angeles.

== Career ==
In 2010, he made his directorial debut, SkyDiver (Instructional Video #4: Preparation for Mission), starring Kate Lyn Sheil, Lawrence Michael Levine, and Sophia Amoruso. The next year, he co-wrote, edited, and directed 0s & 1s, starring Morgan Krantz, Jeremy Blackman, Matty Cardarople, and Ahna O'Reilly.

In 2012, he wrote, starred, and directed Feast of Burden, premiered at The Museum of Contemporary Art, Los Angeles. In 2015, A Wonderful Cloud, starring Kate Lyn Sheil, John Ennis, and himself, premiered at the SXSW Film Festival.

In 2018, Kotlyarenko wrote, starred, and directed Wobble Palace starring Dasha Nekrasova, Jack Kilmer, and himself. The film premiered at the SXSW Film Festival to positive reviews with New York Times, critic Teo Bugbee praising the film as "[...] a sendup of broke-artist types that shimmers with abashed affection". A review on The Playlist by Lena Wilson echoed this sentiment, writing that it: "[...] perfectly reproduces a subculture, both visually and narratively".

In 2020, Kotlyarenko wrote, produced, starred, and directed Spree starring Joe Keery, Sasheer Zamata, David Arquette, Kyle Mooney, Lala Kent and Mischa Barton, the film was executive produced by Drake. It premiered on January 24, 2020, at the 2020 Sundance Film Festival as part of the NEXT category, and was released theatrically and via video on demand in the United States on August 14, 2020, by RLJE Films. The same year, he wrote and directed We Are', starring Dasha Nekrasova, Keith Poulson, and Vishwam Velandy.

In 2024, he wrote, starred, and directed The Code. It stars Dasha Nekrasova, Peter Vack, and Ivy Wolk, it premiered at the Fantasia International Film Festival.

He has executive produced films such as How to Blow Up a Pipeline, Pet Shop Days, Rotting in the Sun, and the upcoming The Carpenter's Son. He has also produced films such as Harka, Magic Farm, Candelabra, and the upcoming Born to Kill.

== Filmography ==
Year	Title	Director	Writer	Actor	Editor	Producer
2010	SkyDiver (Instructional Video #4: Preparation for Mission)	Yes	Yes	Yes		Yes
2011	0s & 1s	Yes	Yes	No	Yes	No
2012	Feast of Burden	Yes	Yes	Yes	No	No
2015	A Wonderful Cloud	Yes	Yes	Yes	No	No
2018	Wobble Palace	Yes	Yes	Yes	No	No
2020	Spree	Yes	Yes	Yes	No	Yes
2020	We Are	Yes	Yes	No	No	No
2020	How to Blow Up a Pipeline	No	No	No	No	Yes
2024	The Code	Yes	Yes	Yes	No	No
2025	The Carpenter's Son	No	No	No	No	Yes
2025	Our Hero, Balthazar	No	No	No	No	Yes
2026	Vintage Violence	Yes	Yes	No	No	Yes
2026	Primetime	No	No	Yes	No	No
