= Deadstream =

- Official poster
- Directed by: Vanessa Winter; Joseph Winter
- Written by: Vanessa Winter; Joseph Winter
- Produced by: Jared Cook; Vanessa Winter; Joseph Winter; Melanie Stone
- Starring: Joseph Winter; Melanie Stone; Jason K. Wixom
- Cinematography: Jared Cook
- Edited by: Vanessa Winter; Joseph Winter
- Music by: Joseph Winter
- Production companies: Winterspectre Entertainment; Cook Filmworks; Stonehaven Entertainment
- Distributed by: Shudder
- Release dates: March 11, 2022 (SXSW); October 6, 2022
- Running time: 88 minutes
- Country: United States
- Language: English

Deadstream is a 2022 American supernatural horror comedy film directed, written, produced and edited by married filmmakers Vanessa and Joseph Winter in their feature directorial debut, with Joseph also starring and composing the film's music.

The plot follows a disgraced content creator attempting to resurrect his career by livestreaming himself spending the night in a notorious haunted house; the film uses a found footage format, displaying the livestream itself. Deadstream had its world premiere at South by Southwest on March 11, 2022, and was released in the United States on October 6, 2022, by Shudder to positive reviews.

== Plot ==
Disgraced internet personality Shawn plans to livestream himself spending the night in Death Manor, a purportedly haunted house where several people have died. After he arrives, Shawn throws his spark plugs in the woods and locks himself inside with a padlock, and tosses the key down a grate.

Shawn recounts Death Manor's reported haunting by the ghost of Mildred Pratt, a wealthy Mormon heiress and failed poet who died by suicide after her publisher and paramour Lars's sudden death. Subsequent occupants of the house died mysteriously and the place was eventually abandoned. While exploring the house, Shawn discovers and destroys a symbol hanging in a closet.

While Shawn attempts to provoke the spirits via a séance, he fearfully shuts himself in his room after hearing strange noises. It is revealed to be Chrissy, a massive fan who has traveled to Death Manor to meet him. The two find Mildred's poetry book and try to speak to her spirit through a spirit board. Chrissy convinces Shawn to recite a Latin phrase to put the ghosts to rest.

Disturbed and annoyed by her behavior, Shawn demands that Chrissy leave. Instead, she suddenly bites his neck and Shawn stabs her in defense. Believing he's killed her, Shawn momentarily leaves but finds her body gone. Shawn searches the grate where he had thrown his keys, but only finds the key to a box containing a severed finger and a picture revealing that Chrissy is actually Mildred Pratt. Viewers inform Shawn that the symbol he destroyed earlier was a hamsa meant to protect against evil and that the Latin phrase he recited was used by Mildred to bind souls to herself. An elderly viewer tells Shawn that the ritual requires a sacrifice of flesh. After being terrorized by ghosts, Shawn jumps out the second-floor window.

Shawn finds the spark plugs and damages his tablet fighting a ghoul off. Cut off from his viewers and resigned to his fate, Shawn takes shelter in his car and reads from Mildred's book of poetry. He discovers the incantation that Mildred used to gain her satanic powers is in one of her poems. Shawn realizes Mildred never wanted a family, but an audience for her poetry. Shawn's audience inspires him to complete the ritual and banish her spirit.

Shawn returns to the house to challenge Mildred. Shawn makes it back to his equipment to retrieve a spare tablet and reads the comments that translate the incantation. While setting up the ritual, Shawn apologizes for all of his insensitive stunts, racism, and poor first apology, vowing to be better.

After a grueling fight with Mildred, Shawn reads the incantation, which fails. Spotting her severed finger, he remembers the ritual requires a sacrifice and cuts off a finger to complete the ritual. The ritual causes Mildred to be dragged into a blood-filled basement by an unseen force. Shawn celebrates, thanking his now-massive viewer count for helping him survive the night. However, as he is about to exit, he is surrounded by Mildred's own audience and his livestream cuts off and ends.

== Cast ==
- Joseph Winter as Shawn Ruddy
- Melanie Stone as Chrissy / Mildred
- Marty Collins as Max Loland
- Jason K. Wixom as Corner Man / Cop Corpse

== Production ==
Vanessa Winter said that the film's format was the starting point for its development. She became interested in finding the "most cinematic version of a livestream", which led to the film's multicamera format. Joseph Winter said that Shawn's character was partly shaped by controversies involving PewDiePie and other YouTubers. The filmmakers then studied established YouTubers to make Shawn believable as someone an audience would actually watch.

Producer and cinematographer Jared Cook developed much of the camera setup used for the livestream format. The Winters said that it took several months to settle on the rigs and other equipment. Cook also built an interactive interface in Keynote for the iPad used in the film. Videos of individual rooms appeared in a grid and played when Winter tapped them, instead of requiring the interface to be added later through green-screen compositing.

The house used as the film's main location was an abandoned building in Benjamin, Utah, found after Joseph Winter asked on Facebook for suggestions of abandoned houses. Its layout led to rewrites: an existing secret room and cellar were incorporated into the screenplay. Vanessa Winter said that the building's wallpaper and graffiti influenced the film's use of color, and credited production designer Amy Leah Nelson Smith with making use of the location's existing colors and textures.

Troy Larson designed the film's creatures, while Mikaela Kester worked on its makeup effects. When budget limitations led the filmmakers to consider cutting some effects gags, Larson and Kester found ways to retain them. The effects in Deadstream were practical; Joseph Winter said that no computer-generated imagery was used. Cook did, however, sometimes composite elements from separate practical-effects takes in post-production.

== Release ==
Deadstream had its world premiere in the Midnighters section of the South by Southwest Film Festival on March 11, 2022. The day before the premiere, Shudder announced that it had acquired rights to the film and would be its exclusive streaming home in North America, the United Kingdom, Ireland, Australia and New Zealand.

The film was released on Shudder on October 6, 2022.

== Reception ==
On the review aggregator website Rotten Tomatoes, 92% of 61 critics' reviews are positive. The website's consensus reads, "Proof that there's still life in the found-footage gimmick, Deadstream is a scarily good bit of B-movie fun." Metacritic, which uses a weighted average, assigned the film a score of 67 out of 100 based on 10 critics, indicating "generally favorable" reviews.

Leslie Felperin of The Guardian gave the film three out of five stars, calling it a "Gen Z version of The Blair Witch Project" and praising Joseph Winter's performance and the film's shifts between horror, gross-out comedy and self-mockery. In a Halloween horror roundup for the Los Angeles Times, Jen Yamato wrote that the Winters brought a "fresh spin and lively comic mania" to found footage and described Deadstream as a "signpost of our Very Online times".

Isaac Feldberg of RogerEbert.com gave Deadstream two and a half out of four stars. He found the film more irreverent than insightful and thought it needed a tighter edit, while admiring its commitment to its deliberately silly premise. Steven Scaife of Slant Magazine gave it two out of four stars. He found some of its camera ideas effective, but argued that the film's uncertainty over whether Shawn had staged the events ultimately worked against it and that it did not live up to its premise.

== See also ==
- ChadGetsTheAxe, a 2022 horror film about an influencer targeted by cult members
- Livescreamers, a 2023 horror film about video game content creators targeted by supernatural evil
- Funhouse, a 2019 horror film where a killer livestreams the deaths of reality show contestants
- Spree, a 2020 black comedy following a small influencer who kills people on a rideshare app for views
