= Bleed Out =

Bleed Out may refer to:

- Bleed Out (film), 2018 documentary film
- Bleed Out (Mountain Goats album), 2022
- Bleed Out (Within Temptation album), 2023
- Bleed Out, 2011 film by Dutch Marich
- "Bleed Out", 2011 song by Jason Derulo from Future History
- "Bleed Out", 2022 single by D4vd
- "Bleed Out", 2013 episode of Southland
- "Bleed Out", 2013 song by Blue October from Sway
- "Bleed Out", 2015 song by Scott Weiland and the Wildabouts from Blaster
- "Bleed Out", 2018 episode of Wentworth

== See also ==
- Exsanguination, death caused by loss of blood
