= Invoking Yell =

2023 Chilean horror film

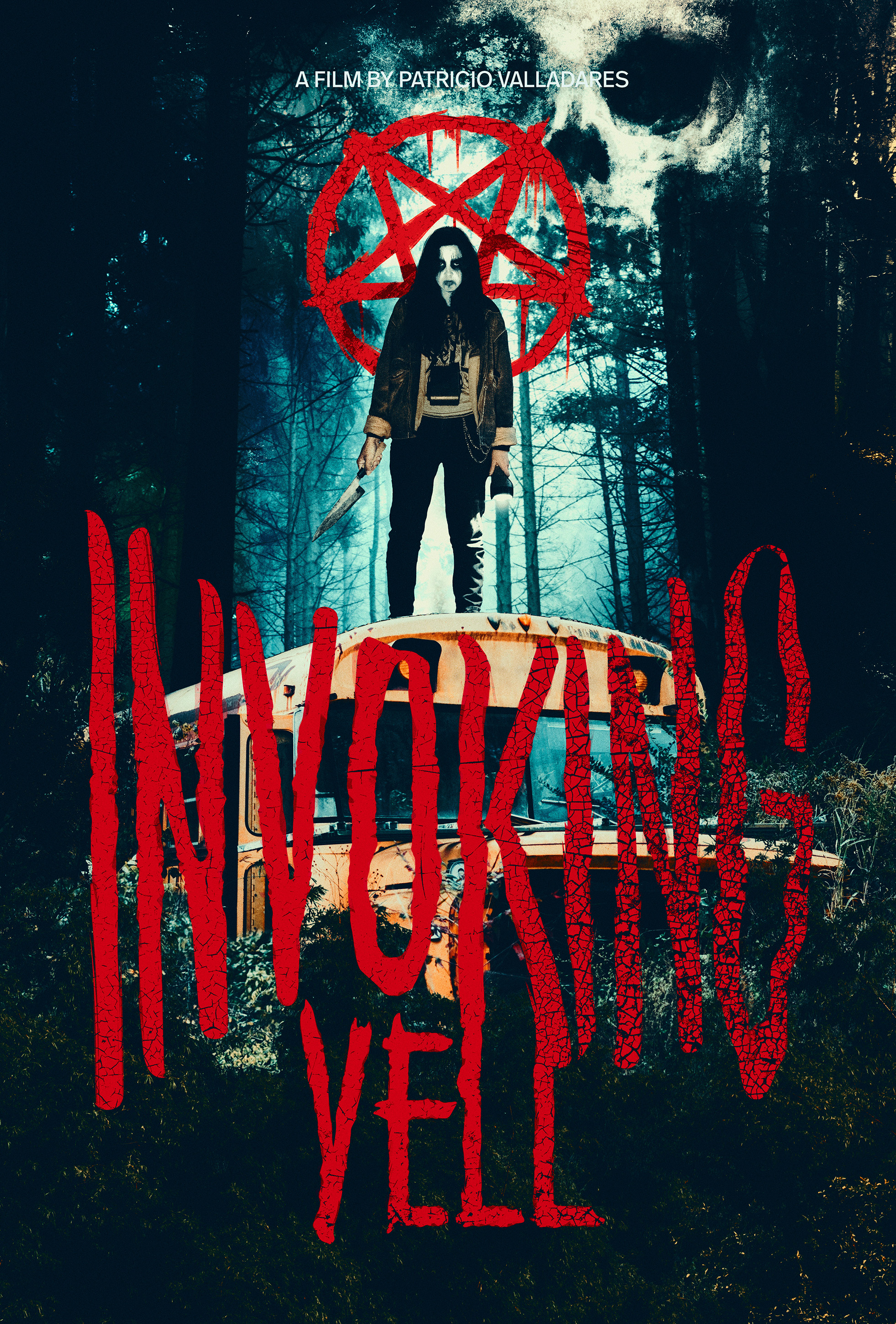
- Promotional release poster
- Directed by: Patricio Valladares
- Written by: Patricio Valladares; Barry Keating
- Produced by: Diego Moral Heimpell; Patricio Valladares; Vittorio Farfan
- Cinematography: Vittorio Farfan
- Edited by: Patricio Valladares
- Music by: Claudio Rocco
- Production companies: Moral Bros Entertainment; Vallastudio Films
- Distributed by: Welcome Villain Films
- Release dates: March 26, 2023 (Unnamed Footage Festival); March 26, 2023
- Running time: 84 minutes
- Country: Chile
- Language: Spanish

Invoking Yell is a 2023 Chilean horror film written, directed by Patricio Valladares. It is presented as found footage about three young women venture into the woods to shoot a demo tape for their black metal band. However, things take a sinister turn as they document their disturbing and unorthodox process of recording paranormal phenomena.

Invoking Yell premiered at the Unnamed Footage Festival on March 26, 2023, after which it screened at several other film festivals including Panic Fest, Chattanooga Film Festival, Popcorn Frights Film Festival, Portland Horror Film Festival, and Mórbido Fest.

== Plot ==
The film is set in 1997 South of Chile, a trio of metalhead twenty something girls venture into the woods to shoot their demo tape for their black metal band, Invoking Yell, while also documenting the eerie and unsettling process of recording psicofonias in the woods for the final track.

== Cast ==
- María Jesús Marcone as Andrea
- Macarena Carrere as Tania
- Andrea Ozuljevich as Ruth

== Release ==
Invoking Yell premiered at the Unnamed Footage Festival on March 26, 2023. It went on to play on such other film festivals as Panic Fest, and the Chattanooga Film Festival, as well as Popcorn Frights Film Festival in Florida, Miami. By July 28, 2023, Welcome Villain acquired the film's North America and international distribution rights for territories.

== Production ==
The film was independently financed and shot in Los Lleuques by Vallastudio Films, on a very small budget. It was a three-day shoot, with a month of pre-production and a post-production stage of six months. In an interview with The Pit magazine, Valladares said:

"I'll start by saying that filming the movie was quite a wild ride. We shot the entire film in just three days. We began on a Thursday and wrapped up on Saturday. The crew consisted of only three people plus the actresses. Since it was a documentary-style film, we had a lot of creative freedom when it came to shooting. Now, filming at night in a forest was challenging. Our only source of light was an LED light on the camera, so we had only a few meters of illuminated area. It was complex, but it turned out to be a lot of fun. Many scenes were shot behind the cabin where we were staying, though in the film, it looks like we were deep in the mountains. I divided all the nighttime scenes in the film into two days of shooting. I believe we managed to capture some really unsettling moments, where the silence and the sound of the trees rustling in the wind were the main focus".

== Reception ==
=== Critical response ===
On the review aggregator website Rotten Tomatoes, the film has a weighted average score of 86%. Its critical consensus says, "Invoking Yell In Patricio Valladares' found footage ghost story/freakout psychodrama, three women try to put black metal on the Chilean map."

Michelle Swope of Bloody Disgusting commended the film for "Elements of the supernatural and occult rituals and riveting performances make the final act of Invoking Yell shocking, anxiety-inducing, and genuinely horrifying. Fans of found footage will especially enjoy this film.". Mary Beth McAndrews, writing for Dread Central, stated that the film "'Invoking Yell' is violent, creepy, and a shining example of contemporary international found footage."
