= Wobble Palace =

2018 film directed by Eugene Kotlyarenko

- Film poster
- Directed by: Eugene Kotlyarenko
- Screenplay by: Eugene Kotlyarenko; Dasha Nekrasova
- Starring: Eugene Kotlyarenko; Dasha Nekrasova
- Cinematography: Sean Price Williams
- Edited by: Benjamin Moses Smith
- Distributed by: Breaking Glass Pictures
- Release date: March 9, 2018 (SXSW)
- Running time: 86 minutes
- Country: United States
- Language: English

Wobble Palace is a 2018 romantic comedy film directed by Eugene Kotlyarenko, who co-wrote the screenplay with Dasha Nekrasova. Kotlyarenko and Nekrasova also star in the leading roles.

== Plot ==
A couple in Los Angeles decides to spend alternate days of Halloween weekend 2016 in the house they share as their mutual interest in their relationship wanes.

== Cast ==
- Eugene Kotlyarenko as Eugene
- Dasha Nekrasova as Jane
- Paige Elkington as Caroline
- Kim Ye as Esther
- Brian Lee Hughes as Rideshare driver
- Janiva Ellis as Logan
- Caroline Hebert as Desi
- Jack Kilmer as Dayton

== Reception ==
On the review aggregator website Rotten Tomatoes, 70% of 10 critics' reviews are positive.

Reviews of the film were mostly positive. In the New York Times, critic Teo Bugbee praised the film as "[...] a sendup of broke-artist types that shimmers with abashed affection". A review on The Playlist by Lena Wilson echoed this sentiment, writing that it: "[...] perfectly reproduces a subculture, both visually and narratively". RogerEbert.com highlighted Jane's portion of the narrative, saying the film "[...] picks up and flies" when focused on her.

Michael Zelenko, writing for The Verge, praised the film's depiction of the characters' relationship with their cell phones.
