= The Outwaters =

2022 American horror film

- Promotional release poster
- Directed by: Robbie Banfitch
- Written by: Robbie Banfitch
- Produced by: Robbie Banfitch
- Starring: Robbie Banfitch; Angela Basolis; Scott Schamell; Michelle May
- Cinematography: Robbie Banfitch
- Edited by: Robbie Banfitch
- Music by: Salem Belladonna
- Production companies: 5100 Films; Fathom Film Company
- Distributed by: Cinedigm
- Release dates: February 12, 2022 (NJFF); February 9, 2023 (United States)
- Running time: 110 minutes
- Country: United States
- Language: English
- Budget: $15,000

The Outwaters is a 2022 American surrealist horror film written, directed, produced, and edited by Robbie Banfitch, who stars alongside Angela Basolis, Scott Schamell, and Michelle May. It is presented as found footage from memory cards belonging to a group of friends who venture into the Mojave Desert in 2017 to shoot a music video, where they encounter mysterious and threatening phenomena.

The Outwaters premiered at the New Jersey Film Festival on February 12, 2022, after which it screened at several other film festivals. The film was released in select theaters in the United States by Cinedigm on February 9, 2023.

== Plot ==
The film opens with the sound of a panicked 9-1-1 call and visuals indicating that a group of friends named Robbie, Angela, Scott, and Michelle have been missing since 2017. A title card explains that the subsequent footage was recovered from three memory cards found in the Mojave Desert.

Robbie, an aspiring filmmaker in Los Angeles, recruits his brother Scott and his friend Angela to help film a music video for his friend Michelle in the Mojave. While getting ready for the expedition, he celebrates Scott's birthday, surprises their mother back home, parties with Angela, and talks to Michelle about her recently deceased mother. Footage of two separate earthquakes captured by Robbie from his apartment is also shown.

The four friends pack their equipment and begin their journey, spending the first night at a small lake. They continue deeper into the desert the next day and encounter a pack of donkeys blocking the road. They arrive at their final location, a small hillside area near a dried-up lakebed, and begin setting up camp. At night, the four are awakened by booming sounds and frantic animal noises that appear to be getting closer. Scott and Robbie leave their tent to investigate but find no clues. Robbie continues by himself and sees a strobing light along a hillside path.

The next day, the crew discuss the uncanny events of the previous evening and begin filming the video. During a break, Robbie and Michelle investigate the area where he saw the light and record high-pitched noises coming from a nearby hole, sensing something unusual beneath the earth. Robbie remarks that his camera battery has not gone down the entire time they've been there. Later, Robbie sees an axe at the top of a nearby hill. The crew head to the lakebed to finish filming the video, and the sound is overtaken by noises similar to the ones heard earlier in the hole. At night, the crew once again hear the booms and animal sounds. Robbie wanders off and sees a naked man on a hill wielding an axe. As he runs away, the man attacks Robbie off screen, giving him a head injury. Robbie returns to camp, bloody and disoriented, and finds Scott asleep but the women frantic.

The camera cuts to Robbie running through the desert as the two girls scream and plead for their lives. He encounters Scott and Angela, both soaked in blood. Robbie escapes and takes shelter in a small ravine until morning. He exits, naked and disoriented, and starts wandering the desert aimlessly. He finds that the area is now infested with screaming, fleshy, worm-like creatures. That night, he returns to the campsite to find the two tents covered in viscera and sees what appears to be Michelle's body. After a number of close calls with his assailant, Robbie is transported to a pool of red liquid by the light. He is taken back to the desert, vomits blood, and removes an unknown substance from his foot. He encounters the pack of donkeys, then sees himself and his three friends walking through the desert from when they first arrived. He sees a blood-soaked Michelle running across the lakebed and chases her. He encounters a bloodied Scott and Angela, acting normally, at the campsite. Exiting the tent, he finds himself at his mother's house and then on the wing of a plane, where he sees Scott through the window.

Back in the desert, in total darkness, Robbie runs into a large monster that closely inspects him and appears to be calling to similar creatures in the distance. He runs away and sees Angela back at camp, and the two are attacked by the worms. Robbie is carried by an unseen force that transports him back into the red liquid, and the camera is shown rapidly flying through a series of white lights before returning to the desert. Robbie finds a gas mask and an old sign indicating that he is in a government-restricted area and encounters his assailant, who appears to be his doppelgänger. The next day, Robbie finds the decomposing heads of his three companions impaled on pikes. He then finds the tooth of a large animal on the ground. He uses it to sever his penis and disembowel himself before reaching up towards the sun.

== Cast ==
- Robbie Banfitch as Robbie Zagorac
- Angela Basolis as Angela Bocuzzi
- Scott Schamell as Scott Zagorac
- Michelle May as Michelle August
- Leslie Ann Banfitch as Leslie Zagorac
- Aro Caitlin as Aro Aguilar
- Christine Brown as 911 Operator
- Nancy Bujnowski as Flight Attendant

== Release ==
The Outwaters premiered at the New Jersey Film Festival on February 12, 2022. It went on to play at other American film festivals like the Unnamed Footage Festival, Panic Fest, and the Chattanooga Film Festival, as well as British festivals such as the Dead of Night Film Festival in Southport. By September 2022, the film's North American distribution rights were acquired by Cinedigm. In February 2023, Blue Finch Film Releasing acquired distribution rights for territories outside North America.

The film received a limited theatrical release by Cinedigm in the United States on February 9, 2023, followed by a release on the horror streaming service Screambox on February 17, 2023.

An after-party was held at a bar in New York City's Astoria neighborhood on February 13, 2023, and included a showing of Harmony Korine's film Trash Humpers.

== Reception ==
=== Critical response ===
On the review aggregator website Rotten Tomatoes, the film is rated at 75% based on 69 reviews. Its critical consensus says, "The Outwaters may strike some viewers as frustratingly withholding, but it remains an ambitious—and overall effective—slice of found-footage horror." Metacritic, which uses a weighted average, assigned the film a score of 72 out of 100, based on 13 critics, indicating "generally favorable" reviews.

Meagan Navarro of Bloody Disgusting commended the film for "[transforming] the found footage format into something far more transgressive" and wrote that "Banfitch mercilessly lulls viewers with a soothing intro before ripping open a dark abyss beneath them, flinging them into an immersive pit of visceral madness". Grace Detwiler, writing for Rue Morgue, stated that the film "will likely be most effective for viewers who are strongly affected by the power of suggestion". Asserting that the film's handling of characterization is both its greatest fault and its greatest achievement, she added, "Banfitch has a clear talent for character development, which is thrown out the window as soon as the true horror begins. Yet, getting to know his cast of characters only makes watching their annihilation more gut-wrenching in the end."

=== Accolades ===
Year	Award	Category	Result	Ref(s)
2022	Unnamed Footage Festival	Jury Prize for Best Feature	Won	
2022	Dead of Night Film Festival	Best Feature	Won	
