= A Wonderful Cloud =

2015 American romantic comedy film

- Directed by: Eugene Kotlyarenko
- Screenplay by: Eugene Kotlyarenko
- Produced by: Brande Bytheway
- Starring: Kate Lyn Sheil; Eugene Kotlyarenko
- Cinematography: Dan O'Sullivan
- Edited by: Benjamin Moses Smith
- Music by: Johnny Paul
- Production companies: Dirty Pictures; BTW Productions
- Distributed by: FilmBuff
- Release dates: March 15, 2015 (South by Southwest); October 23, 2015
- Running time: 79 minutes 81 minutes
- Country: United States
- Language: English

A Wonderful Cloud is a 2015 American romantic comedy film written and directed by Eugene Kotlyarenko and starring Kate Lyn Sheil and Kotlyarenko.

== Cast ==
- Eugene Kotlyarenko
- Kate Lyn Sheil
- John Ennis
- Vishwam Velandy
- Rachel Lord
- Lauren Avery
- Niko Karamyan
- Tierney Finster
- Elisha Drons

== Release ==
The film premiered at South by Southwest on March 15, 2015. FilmBuff acquired American distribution rights to the film in October 2015. The film was released in select theaters and on VOD on October 23, 2015.

== Reception ==
Nikola Grozdanovic of IndieWire graded the film a B. Ronnie Scheib of Variety gave the film a positive review and wrote, "Filmmaker Eugene Kotlyareno and his real-life ex Kate Lyn Sheil play out a dysfunctional L.A. reunion in this raucous, freewheeling comedy."
