= Chris Agos =

American actor

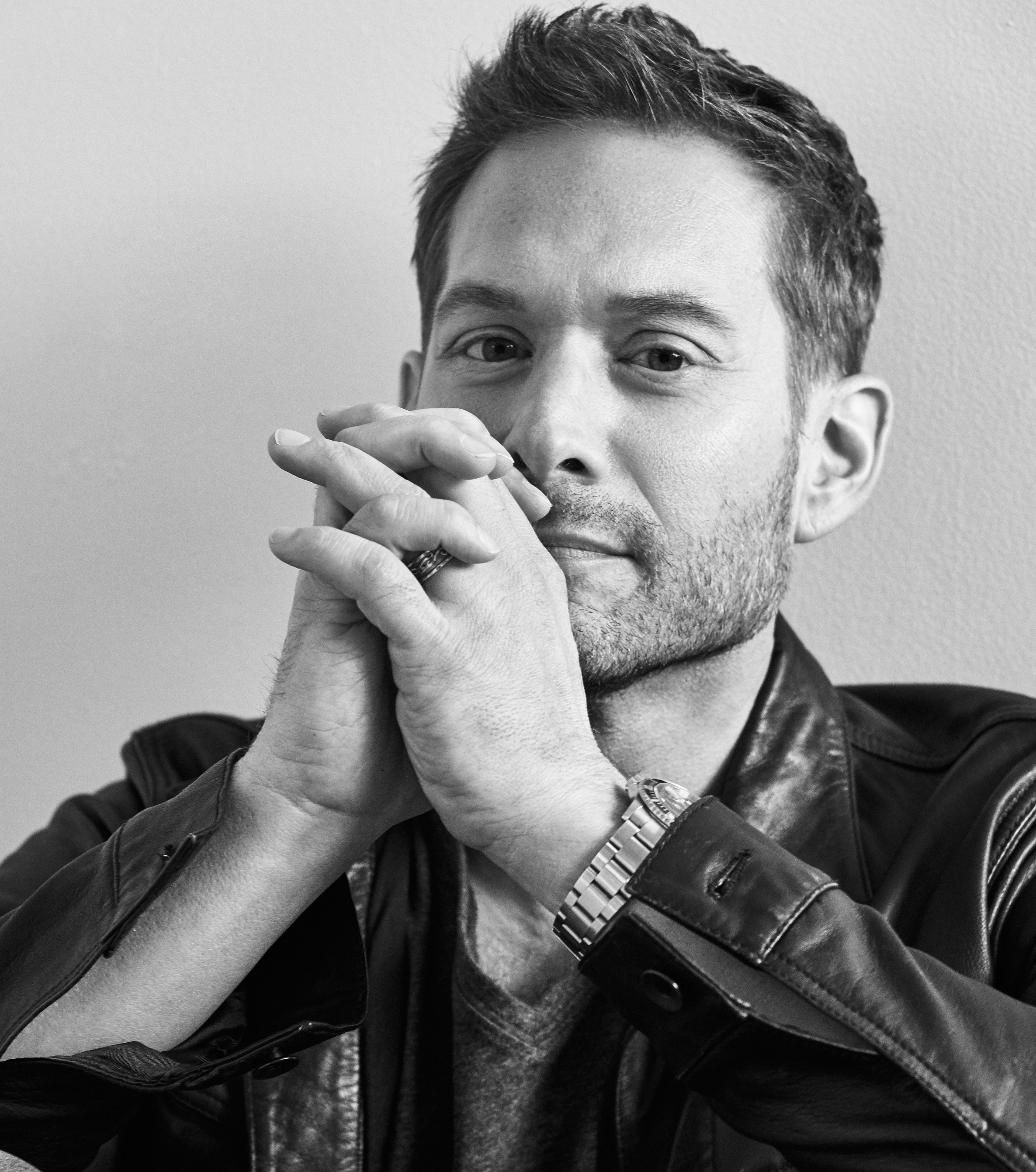
- Photo by The Riker Brothers
- Born: Joliet, Illinois, USA
- Occupations: Actor, Voice Actor
- Years active: 1995–present
- Children: 2
- Website: www.chrisagos.com

Chris Agos is an American actor. Agos played Apollo 11 astronaut Buzz Aldrin in the Apple TV+ original science fiction space drama series For All Mankind, ASA Steve Kot in Chicago PD on NBC, Eliot McGantry in Boss on Starz, and has had numerous single-episode appearances on television shows such as Grey's Anatomy, House of Cards, and Sirens.

== Early life ==
Agos was born in Joliet, Illinois, the youngest of three. His parents owned and operated fried chicken restaurants in Naperville, Illinois As a boy he attended the Avery Coonley School, a school for academically bright and gifted students. In 2019 he was awarded the school's Distinguished Alumni Award, which recognizes alumni for outstanding leadership in the local, national or global community. In high school Agos was active in drama, appearing in plays and musicals.

== Career ==
Agos began studying voice over acting while attending DePaul University in Chicago as a distraction from medical school entrance exams. In addition to working in voice over, he began appearing in commercials, corporate projects and print ads before being cast in minor roles in television shows such as The Beast, Cooper and Stone, The Chicago Code, Grey's Anatomy, House of Cards, and Sirens. His first multi-episode arc came in 2011 in Boss. In 2014 he was cast as ASA Steve Kot in Chicago PD, a role he played for nearly three seasons. His character was crossed over to companion show Chicago Fire for four episodes over two seasons.

Agos was cast in Man of Steel but his performance was cut from the film. Agos gained media attention after being cast as astronaut Buzz Aldrin in For All Mankind, part of the original slate of four shows which launched the Apple TV+ streaming platform.

Agos is the author of Acting In Chicago: Making a Living Doing Commercials, Voice Overs, TV/Film and More, a guide to the business of acting in the Midwest. He also wrote The Voice Over Startup Guide: How to Land Your First VO Job, a guide to starting a career as a voice actor.

== Personal life ==
Agos and his wife, Patricia, have twin boys.

== Filmography ==
=== Film ===
Year	Title	Role	Notes
2013	Man of Steel	Pediatrician	Deleted Scene

=== Television ===
Year	Title	Role	Notes
2009	The Beast	Stan	Episode: "Nadia"
2011	Cooper and Stone	Bob Walker	Unsold TV Pilot
2011	The Chicago Code	Roger	Episode: "Black Sox"
2011	Boss	Elliot McGantry	Recurring role; 3 episodes
2012	The Mob Doctor	Jim Jamison	Episode: "Legacy"
2012	Sex House	Host	Recurring role; 5 episodes
2013	Betrayal	Kyle	Episode: "One More Shot"
2014–2017	Chicago PD	ASA Steve Kot	Recurring role; 19 episodes
2015	Sirens	Dave	Episode: "Johnny Nightingale"
2016–2017	Chicago Fire	ASA Steve Kot	Recurring role; 4 episodes
2018	Grey's Anatomy	Barry Clemens	Episode: "With a Wonder and a Wild Desire"
2018	House of Cards	Special Agent Rick Bowman	Episode: "Chapter 66"
2019	For All Mankind	Buzz Aldrin	Recurring role; 6 episodes
