= John Ennis (actor) =

American actor

- Education: Emerson College (BA)
- Occupation: Actor
- Years active: 1996–present
- Children: Jessie Ennis

John Ennis is an American actor. He was a cast member on Netflix's W/ Bob & David and on HBO's Mr. Show with Bob and David. Other roles include Walk Hard: The Dewey Cox Story, Zodiac, and the revival of Twin Peaks.

== Early life and education ==
Raised in Wellesley and Needham, Massachusetts, Ennis graduated from Xaverian Brothers High School in Westwood, Massachusetts, and received a bachelor's degree from Emerson College.

== Career ==
Ennis has played roles in Malcolm in the Middle, Tenacious D in the Pick of Destiny, and Walk Hard: The Dewey Cox Story. He played a writer for the fictitious comedy show at the center of Studio 60 on the Sunset Strip. He also played a part in the YouTube channel RocketJump's Video Game High School as Kimberly Swan's father Kenneth Swan. In 2007, Ennis took a small part in the film Zodiac as Terry Pascoe, protégé of the handwriting expert Sherwood Morrill.

In July 2006, Ennis joined with musician and filmmaker Andrew Jon Thomson to form a cowboy harmony western comedy musical group named Saddle Pals, in the spirit of 1930s movie singing cowboy groups such as Sons of the Pioneers and contemporaries such as Riders in the Sky.

He is also an acting teacher, having taught for several years at the Lee Strasberg Theatre Institute in Los Angeles. In the fall of 2007, John Ennis became the "Z" for a series of Wheel of Fortune commercials to celebrate the 25th anniversary of the show.

As of 2015, he stars in commercials for Smith & Forge hard cider and Pur water as well as portraying Windfall Willie for the Arizona Lottery since 2017. He also has starred in short films created by Brandon Calvillo on YouTube. He had a small role as a slots player opposite Kyle MacLachlan in the reboot/third season of Twin Peaks.

In 2020, Ennis appeared as a guest on the Studio 60 on the Sunset Strip marathon fundraiser episode of The George Lucas Talk Show.

In 2022, Ennis played Vinnie Palmieri in an episode of Murderville, and had a guest role in Better Call Saul, a show that has also featured his daughter Jessie in a frequent recurring role.

== Filmography ==
=== Film ===
Year	Title	Role	Notes
1997	Who's the Caboose?	Irish Songster	
1997	Buddy	Policeman	
1997	Courting Courtney	Gil	
1998	Jack Frost	Truck Driver	
2000	Ready to Rumble	Stan	
2002	Run Ronnie Run!	Bartender	Uncredited
2002	Eight Legged Freaks	Cop #1	
2004	Cellular	Rent a Cop #1	
2004	Wake Up, Ron Burgundy: The Lost Movie	Man in news report	
2005	Neighborhood Watch	Scotty	
2006	Tenacious D in The Pick of Destiny	Gang Member	
2007	Zodiac	Terry Pascoe	
2007	Walk Hard: The Dewey Cox Story	The Big Bopper	
2013	Dear Sidewalk	Steve	
2014	Play Nice	Dave Bell	
2015	A Wonderful Cloud	Paulston	
2015	Fun Size Horror: Volume One	Gaylan's Dad	
2015	Contracted: Phase II	Special Agent Dalton	
2015	Freaks of Nature	Coach Pulcifer	
2016	The 4th	Liquor Store Clerk	
2016	Slash	Deron Zaxa	
2016	Nerdland	Detective Donahue	
2019	Love in Moreno Valley	Randy Watson	
2020	The Towering Disaster	Narrator	
2021	My Fiona	Larry	
2022	Allegoria	Robert Anderson Wright	

=== Television ===
Year	Title	Role	Notes
1994–1996	Mr. Show with Bob and David	Various	30 episodes
1996	Men Behaving Badly	Phil	Episode: "Christmas"
1996	Mr. Show with Bob and David: Fantastic Newness	Various	Television film
1997	The Weird Al Show	Dad in Commercial	Episode: "He Ain't Heavy, He's My Hamster"
1998	Buffy the Vampire Slayer	Manager	Episode: "Faith, Hope & Trick"
1998	Two Guys and a Girl	Ashley's Neighbour	Episode: "Two Guys, a Girl and Oxford"
1998	Mr. Show and the Incredible, Fantastical News Report	Various	Television film
1999	Just Shoot Me!	Waiter	Episode: "And the Femmy Goes To..."
1999	Oh, Grow Up	Cameron Dundee	Episode: "Good Pop, Bad Pop"
1999	Frasier	Carlos	Episode: "Radio Wars"
2001–2002	Malcolm in the Middle	Artie	9 episodes
2003	Still Standing	Chuck Quinn	Episode: "Still Our Kids"
2004	Arrested Development	Supervisor	Episode: "Not Without My Daughter"
2004	Pilot Season	Man in Hallway	Miniseries
2004	Last Laugh '04	Bar Patron	Television film
2004	Father of the Pride	Chutney	7 episodes
2004	Man with a Van	Paul	Television film
2005	Kevin Hill	Walter Dalton	Episode: "Cardiac Episode"
2005	Tom Goes to the Mayor	Factory Owner	Episode: "Porcelain Birds"
2005	Weekends at the D.L.	Sheriff Harland Beltone	Episode #1.8
2005	Life as We Know It	Eddie	Episode: "Papa Wheelie"
2006	Rodney	Johnny	Episode: "When Rodney Comes Marching Home"
2006	Switchstance	Officer Frank Turnbull	Television film
2006–2007	Studio 60 on the Sunset Strip	Denny / Writer #1	6 episodes
2007–2019	American Dad!	Tex / Criminal / Driver	6 episodes
2008	Reno 911!	Bus Passenger	Episode: "The Wall"
2008	Downers Grove	John	2 episodes
2008	Chocolate News	Officer Herlihay	Episode #1.6
2008, 2010	The Sarah Silverman Program	Free Hug Guy / Stranger	2 episodes
2010	True Jackson, VP	F. David Pillows	Episode: "Little Buddies"
2010	Tim and Eric Awesome Show, Great Job!	Bronze Man	Episode: "Crows"
2011	Jon Benjamin Has a Van	Smoking Driver	Episode: "Smoking"
2011	Nick Swardson's Pretend Time	Magic Fan	Episode: "Flying Stripper"
2011	Let's Do This!	Camera and Boom Op Guy	Television film
2013	Shelf Life	Sailor Squint	Episode: "Rub-A-Dub-Dub"
2013	Comedy Bang! Bang!	Army General	Episode: "Rainn Wilson"
2013	2Fur1	Oliver	8 episodes
2013	The Funtime Gang	Photographer	Television film
2013–2014	Video Game High School	Ken Swan / John Ennis	6 episodes
2014	Anger Management	Balloon Guy	Episode: "Charlie and Sean Fight Over a Girl"
2014	It's Only Temporary	Leslie	Television film
2014	The Walsh Bros. Great & Secret Comedy Show	John	2 episodes
2014	Fishbowls Are Definitely My Thing	Pork Macintosh	Episode #1.5
2014	Santiago	Father Manager	Episode #1.3
2014–2015	TMI Hollywood	Various / Host	3 episodes
2014–2018	Mr. Pickles	Various roles	8 episodes
2015	Battle Creek	Richard	Episode: "Old Flames"
2015	Why? with Hannibal Buress	Patriot	Episode: "8th of July Celebration!"
2015	The Mailroom	Llewyn Vanderzwaag	Episode #1.4
2015	W/ Bob & David	Various roles	4 episodes
2015–2016	Stupid Bitch	Dad	5 episodes
2015, 2016	Another Period	Hobo / Hot Dog Man	2 episodes
2015–2018	Drunk History	Various roles	3 episodes
2016	Love	Don	Episode: "Magic"
2016	D-Sides	Frank	Episode: "Daddy's Comin' Home Tonight"
2016	Bajillion Dollar Propertie$	Cable Guy	Episode: "Brtox"
2016	Filthy Preppy Teens	Reynard	Episode: "The Island"
2016	Hidden America with Jonah Ray	Birddog	Episode: "Austin: End of the Road"
2017	The Mick	Sully	Episode: "The Balloon"
2017	Mourners, Inc.	Harvey	Episode: "Pilot"
2017	Twin Peaks	Slot Machine Man	Episode: "Part 3"
2017	Adam Ruins Everything	Rich Administrator	Episode: "Adam Ruins College"
2018	A Tale of Two Coreys	Agent	Television film
2018	Townies	Sass Wooderen	5 episodes
2019	Kevin Hart's Guide to Black History	Various roles	Television film
2019	Second Chances with Jason Nash	Bob	Episode: "Jason Nash Learns to Fight"
2019	Star Wars Resistance	Various roles	3 episodes
2019	Momma Named Me Sheriff	Space Captain	Episode: "Television"
2019	Artista Obscura	Henri Coutard	Television film
2020	Brews Brothers	Brother Thomas	2 episodes
2020	Dead to Me	Slade	2 episodes
2021	Bunk'd	Pop Pop	Episode: "Pop Pop Poppin' In"
2022	Murderville	Vinnie Palmieri	Episode: "Murder by Soup"
2022	Better Call Saul	Lenny	2 episodes
