= Long Pigs =

- Theatrical release poster
- Directed by: Chris Power; Nathan Hynes
- Written by: Chris Power; Nathan Hynes
- Produced by: Chris Power; Nathan Hynes
- Starring: Anthony Alviano; Jean-Marc Fontaine; Paul Fowles
- Production companies: Clowns After Midnight Productions; Jordan Entertainment
- Distributed by: R-Squared Films
- Release date: September 6, 2007
- Running time: 81 minutes
- Country: Canada
- Language: English
- Budget: $CAD250,000 (estimated)

Long Pigs is a 2007 Canadian comedy-horror mockumentary film about two documentary filmmakers who follow a serial killer who has a taste for cooking with human flesh. The story is conveyed via found footage. The special effects were provided by Chris Bridges, whose other credits include Saw III, 300, and the remake of Dawn of the Dead.

The title of the film refers to the phrase "long pig," a term for human flesh in cannibalism lore.

== Background ==
Power and Hynes were inspired to create Long Pigs after Hynes heard a story about a cannibal who killed several people in a small town; the two also took inspiration from their own fledgling filmmaking careers. They wrote Long Pigs specifically with lead actor Anthony Alviano in mind. Influences on the film's style included the film Henry: Portrait of a Serial Killer, as well as documentaries by Nick Broomfield and the team Joe Berlinger and Bruce Sinofsky.

Filming took place in Toronto, Ontario, Canada. Most of the footage was shot in December 2003, although the duo would not release the film until years later, after substantial reworks. Unsatisfied with the special effects work—Power recalled one candidate creating a prop corpse "that looked more like a baked ham"—they met Bridges, whom they credited with "literally saving [the] film."

Long Pigs was shown throughout the US in 2010, premiering in Milwaukee on April 22. The film also played at Detroit’s Motor City Nightmares and Texas Frightmare Weekend.

== Plot ==
Two desperate and young filmmakers stumble upon the ultimate subject, a 33-year-old cannibalistic serial killer named Anthony McAllister, who has agreed to let them document every aspect of his horrifically violent life-style. Initially terrified, the filmmakers get to know Anthony as a person. They even begin to identify with his ecological and philosophical justifications for his cannibalistic lifestyle.

It's only when they investigate further that the filmmakers begin to doubt Anthony's accounts of his past. Tensions noticeably rise as the filmmakers continue to confront Anthony on his conflicting stories and ever-changing philosophies. During an awkward interview, the filmmakers interview Merle, the father of a young girl who was abducted and never found. This abduction was Anthony's first child victim. Merle welcomes them into his home and gives them a heart-felt experience that even Anthony is touched by.

As the documentary reaches its conclusion, Anthony begins to become uncomfortably aware of how much of his life he has revealed to these filmmakers. In a final interview with Anthony, a deadly confrontation erupts, and all that remains is a broken camera and this footage.

== Cast ==
- Anthony Alviano as Anthony McAlistar
- Jean-Marc Fontaine as the restaurant manager
- Paul Fowles as Merle, the father of the missing child
- Shane Harbinson as Det. Ken Walby
- Roger King as Tony Prince, the radio host
- Kelly McIntosh as Rebecca Stapleton (as Kelly MacIntosh)
- Brad Mittelman as Simon Sullivan
- John Terranova as John Vierra
- Vik Sahay as Dr. Hooshangi
- Barbara Walsh as Lucy, the prostitute

== Critical reception ==
Variety magazine gave the DVD release a mixed review, writing: "Forever seeking to push the envelope, directorial newbies too often reprise outre genre ideas."

The film received several awards from film festivals:

=== Awards ===
Best Picture: Moving Image Film Fest (Toronto)
Best Picture: Mockfest Film Fest (LA)
Best Actor: Mockfest Film Fest (LA)
Best Horror: Evil City Film Fest (NYC)
Best Horror: International Horror & Sci-Fi Fest (PHX)
Best Feature: Texas Frightmare Weekend (TX)
Best Mockudrama: Ricon International Film Fest (PR)

== Home media ==
After three years of being screened at select theaters, Long Pigs was released on DVD on September 6, 2007 through Big Bite Entertainment. Limited editions of the DVD included edible jerky supposedly prepared by in-character Anthony McAlistar.

In 2025, the film was reissued on a special edition DVD through Tarnished Vision Films.
