= Horror in the High Desert =

- Official release poster
- Directed by: Dutch Marich
- Written by: Dutch Marich
- Story by: Dutch Marich
- Produced by: Dutch Marich; Kenton McElroy; Guy Sheerer; Charlize Lane
- Starring: Eric Mencis; Tonya Williams-Ogden; Errol Porter; David Morales; Suziey Block
- Cinematography: Dutch Marich; Daniel Valle; Tim Vidrine
- Edited by: Dutch Marich
- Production companies: Luminol Entertainment, Maya Aerials
- Distributed by: Indie Rights Movies
- Release date: 2021
- Running time: 82 minutes
- Country: USA
- Language: English

Horror in the High Desert is a 2021 American found footage film written, produced, and directed by Dutch Marich. Combining pseudo-documentary elements with traditional found footage, the film follows the mysterious 2017 disappearance of amateur hiker Gary Hinge in Nevada's High Desert. The film is based on the Kenny Veach mystery.

Shot during the COVID-19 pandemic using socially distanced Zoom interviews and reconstructions, the film has developed a cult following on video-on-demand platforms despite receiving mixed reviews.

== Plot ==
The film opens with a reconstruction of events leading up to the disappearance of amateur hiker Gary Hinge in the remote Great Basin Desert of Nevada during July 2017. Gary, whose planned route had taken him from the small town of Ruth to a cabin he had visited on a previous expedition, had been expected to return within a certain timeframe. When he failed to do so—two days past his anticipated arrival—his housemate, Simon Rodgers, alerted Gary's sister, Beverly Hinge, who promptly notified local authorities. With more than a week having passed since his last sighting, the investigation was already burdened with uncertainty.

Initial search and rescue efforts were organized based on the last recorded GPS location from Gary's cell phone. Local and state police, park rangers, and volunteer groups joined forces to scour the desert landscape. A breakthrough, however, came only a few days later when Gary's truck was discovered 55 miles from Ruth at the end of a dirt road, at the base of a small hill. This unexpected find shifted the focus of the investigation; search parties, employing on-foot teams, helicopters, and drones, meticulously combed the surrounding area. Despite these intensive efforts, no trace of Gary was found.

As days turned into more, the authorities eventually declared the likelihood of finding Gary alive to be minimal. Their decision was influenced by the harsh conditions of the desert in peak summer, Gary's known habit of traveling with minimal supplies, and the inherent dangers of the terrain—including local wildlife and numerous abandoned mining pits. With the official search winding down and media interest dwindling, Beverly Hinge decided to take matters into her own hands by hiring private investigator William "Bill" Salerno. Concurrently, local reporter Gal Roberts pushed for continued media coverage, fearing that the case would be forgotten as merely another "cold case."

The investigation then pivoted to the clues available from Gary's abandoned truck, now treated as a crime scene. Forensic analysis revealed an array of unidentified fingerprints—particularly on the steering wheel—and a trail of barefoot footprints that did not match Gary's prints. The inability to match these prints to any known individual left the police with few leads, essentially stalling the official inquiry.

Meanwhile, Salerno began scrutinizing Gary's online presence, uncovering a digital trail that was both surprising and revealing. Under the pseudonym "Scorpion Sam," Gary had cultivated a following of approximately 50,000 on his video blog, where he documented his hiking and survival adventures. One of his later videos, uploaded shortly before his disappearance, recounted an unnerving experience during his last excursion. In that video, Gary described a three-day hike in an unfamiliar area where he detected the smell of smoke and discovered a seemingly abandoned cabin with an active chimney. Disturbed by a sense of imminent danger, he camped at a safe distance. The next day, he noticed a trail of barefoot footprints and felt as though he was being followed—a claim that elicited a mix of skepticism, criticism, and even challenges from his online audience.

In a final, emotionally charged video, Gary explained that he would not disclose the exact location of the cabin, fearing that it might attract inexperienced adventurers to the perilous terrain. Instead, he promised to return with additional equipment, including a video camera and a firearm for protection. Weeks after the truck was found, hikers in White Pine County discovered a backpack—later identified as Gary's—at their campsite. The contents of the bag shocked investigators when they found Gary's severed hand clutching his video camera. Forensic analysis suggested that the hand had been severed while Gary was still alive, within a window of no more than five weeks. The memory card from the camera, when examined, revealed footage of Gary's final night at the mysterious cabin—a sequence that has since fueled intense speculation and a multitude of conspiracy theories linking his disappearance to phenomena ranging from secret government projects and atomic testing to Indigenous rituals, satanic cults, and extraterrestrial encounters.

== Cast ==
- Eric Mencis as Gary Hinge, extreme hiker
- Tonya Williams-Ogden as Beverly Hinge, Gary's sister
- Errol Porter as Simon Rodgers, Gary's housemate
- David Morales as William 'Bill' Salerno, private investigator
- Suziey Block as Gal Roberts, reporter

== Production ==
Because it was filmed safely and with social distancing during the height of the COVID-19 pandemic, no two characters appear on screen together, and all documentary interviews were conducted via Zoom.

== Reception ==
As an independent production, Horror in the High Desert received limited distribution, primarily through video-on-demand platforms. The film earned a special mention in the found footage category of The Last Journo's list of "The Best Horror Films of 2021."

Critical reception was mixed. Jamie Lawler of Horror Buzz praised the film's style, writing that "in a genre that has seen a huge influx of found footage style films in recent years, it's easy for most to blend into the background. The unique mockumentary style coupled with the found footage in Horror in the High Desert makes for a memorable film that stands out among its peers," and gave it a 7/10 rating. Similarly, Waylon Jordan of iHorror noted that "there is a moment in every found footage film where reality takes a turn for the terrifying... Instead, Marich carefully crafts a story that becomes more unsettling at times. He chooses a sense of dread over jump scares and character development over a bloated plot."

In contrast, Steve Hutchison of Tales of Terror criticized the film's pacing and structure, arguing that the documentary format dominates the runtime without offering clear answers, "supporting almost nothing to the central narrative," and that only the found footage segment delivers genuine horror. He rated the film 1.5 out of 4.

== Sequels ==
In 2023, a sequel titled Horror in the High Desert 2: Minerva was released on Prime Video. According to the film's official website, a third installment, Horror in the High Desert 3: Firewatch, followed on July 22, 2024.

In February 2024, Marich confirmed that a fourth and fifth film are planned and in pre-production. He later announced in January 2025 that the fourth entry will be titled Horror in the High Desert 4: Majesty.
