= Jeremy Blackman =

American actor & musician (born 1987)

- Born: c. 1987 (age 38–39)
- Education: Columbia University (BA)
- Occupations: Actor, musician
- Years active: 1998–2011

Jeremy Blackman (born 1987) is an American actor and musician. He starred in the 1999 film Magnolia. He graduated from Columbia University in 2009. He was the lead vocalist for the alternative dance and indie electronic band Pink Drink. He produced experimental music as William Irish. His father, Ian, is also an actor.

== Filmography ==
=== Film ===
Year	Title	Role	Notes
1999	Magnolia	Stanley Spector	
2001	Double Down	Paul	
2011	0s & 1s	Sam	

=== Television ===
Year	Title	Role	Notes
1998	Melrose Place	Little Boy	Episode: "The Usual Santas"
2002	Law & Order	Anthony Cooper	Episode: "Equal Rights"
2004	Crown Heights	Yudi Simon	Television film
2005	Law & Order: Criminal Intent	Clay Turner	Episode: "False-Hearted Judges"
