= Sasheer Zamata =

American actress and comedian (born 1986)

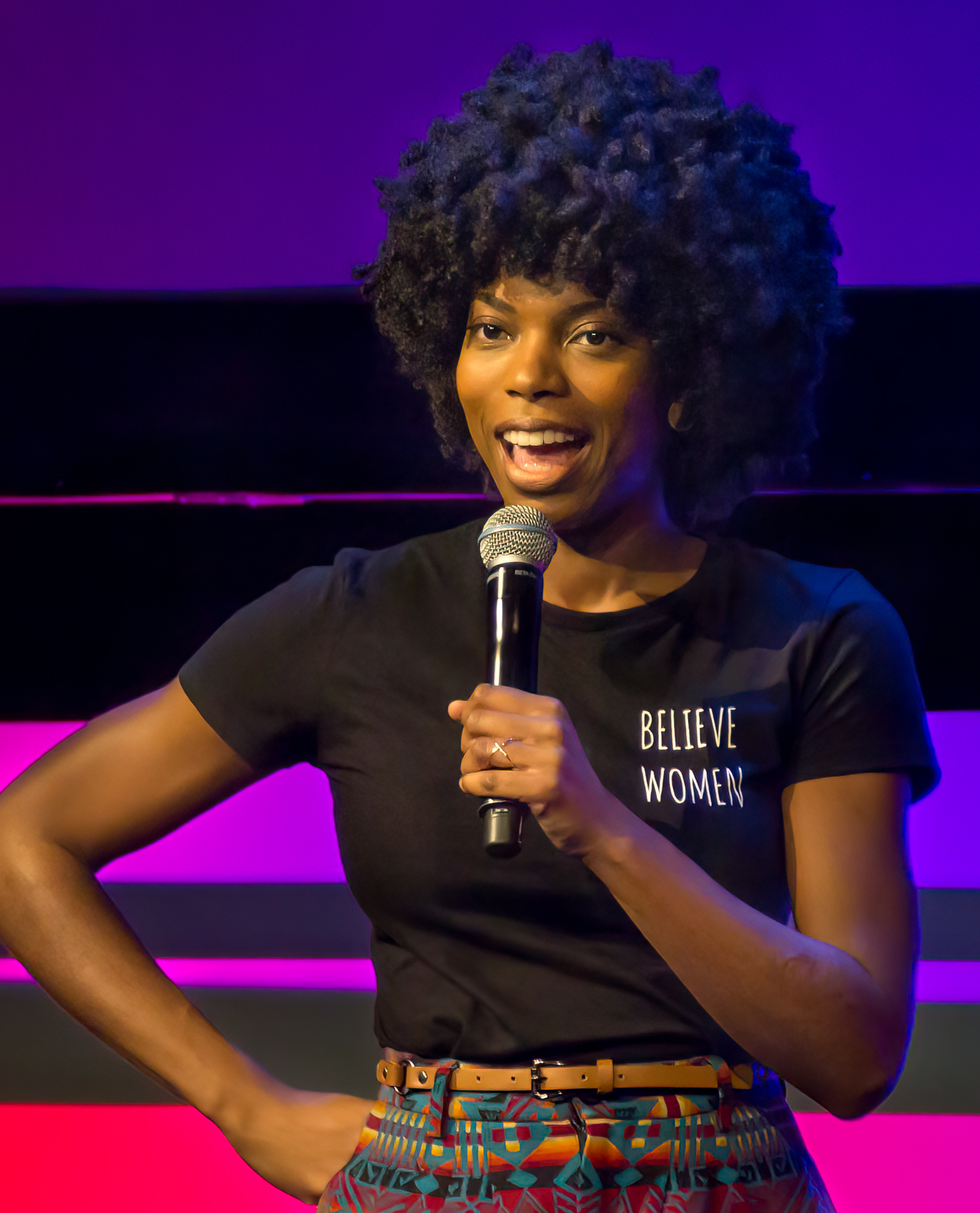
- Zamata performing at the 2018 Tribeca Film Festival
- Born: Sasheer Zamata Moore; May 6, 1986 (age 40); Okinawa, Japan
- Education: University of Virginia (BA)
- Occupations: Actress; comedian
- Years active: 2005–present

Sasheer Zamata Moore (/səˈʃɪər zəˈmeɪtə/; born May 6, 1986) is an American actress and comedian. She rose to prominence as a cast member on the NBC sketch comedy series Saturday Night Live from 2014 to 2017. Since departing SNL, she has garnered wider attention for her starring roles in the TV series Woke (2020–2022), Home Economics (2021–2023), and Agatha All Along (2024).

== Early life ==
Zamata, who is of African American heritage, is the daughter of American parents Ivory Steward and Henry Moore, a lieutenant colonel in the US Air Force. She was born in Okinawa, Japan, because of her father's military career. She is the great-granddaughter of Leroy Washington Mahon, a formerly enslaved man who founded the town of Fargo, Arkansas.

Zamata was raised in Indianapolis, Indiana. She is a graduate of Pike High School. She stated her parents named her after the alien flower-like crystal called the "Sahsheer" from the Star Trek episode "By Any Other Name".

Zamata was a member of the volleyball team at Pike High School and her coach rewarded the team with a trip to ComedySportz Indianapolis, which hosts improv performances. Her mother, Ivory Steward, has said, "That's where I think Sasheer got bit by this comedic bug." That encounter led to weekend workshops to learn about improvisation techniques.

She attended the University of Virginia, and graduated with a Bachelor of Arts degree. Zamata was a founding member of the university's long-form improv comedy troupe, Amuse Bouche. While a student at UVA, she participated in the Disney College Program for one semester, working as a character friend to Buzz Lightyear.

== Career ==
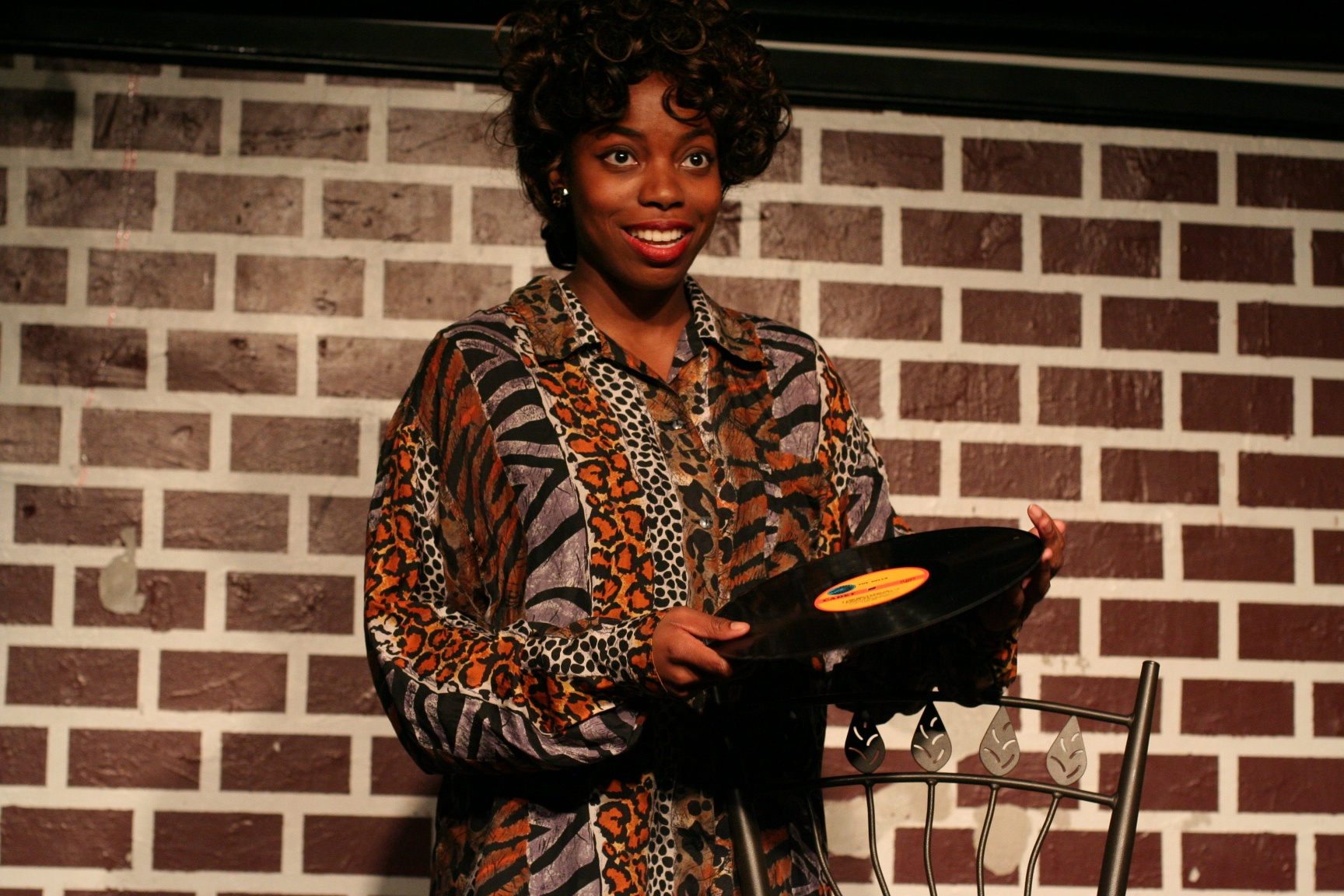
Zamata in 2011

=== Early work and breakthrough (2009–2013) ===
Zamata performed regularly at the Upright Citizens Brigade Theatre in New York City starting in 2009. She co-starred in the ABC News hidden camera series Would You Fall for That? and was a cast member on MTV's series Hey Girl. Zamata also appeared in sketches on Totally Biased with W. Kamau Bell and Inside Amy Schumer. She starred in the webseries Pursuit of Sexiness, and has appeared in sketches for CollegeHumor. Videos on Zamata's YouTube channel include impersonations of Michelle Obama, Rihanna, Nicki Minaj, Tyra Banks, and Beyoncé.

=== Saturday Night Live (2014–2017) ===
In 2014, Zamata joined the cast of NBC's Saturday Night Live (SNL) during its 39th season. She joined the SNL cast amid a season in which TV critics and black comedians had criticized the show for not being ethnically diverse (specifically, not hiring any black female cast members at the start of the new season and only having five of them in the near-40 years the show has been on the air). Zamata was the first black female cast member on SNL since biracial Maya Rudolph departed midway through the show's 33rd season in 2007.

Zamata debuted on SNL as a featured player in the January 18, 2014, episode hosted by Drake, in which she impersonated Rihanna. She was promoted to repertory player in the first episode of Season 41. Some of her recurring characters include Janelle, a teenage girl who hosts a YouTube channel called How 2 Dance with Janelle but is unaware of how her developing sexuality is coming off to viewers, and Keeley, a contestant on an African-American centric version of Jeopardy! called Black Jeopardy!. Some of her celebrity impressions have included the aforementioned Rihanna, Michelle Obama, Kerry Washington, Nicki Minaj, Beyoncé, Solange Knowles, Diana Ross, Lupita Nyong'o, and Taraji P. Henson. She left the show in 2017 after the season 42 finale.

=== Acting, comedy specials, and podcast (2017–present) ===
Since leaving SNL, Zamata has continued her stand-up comedy work, creating two specials: Pizza Mind (2017) and Sasheer Zamata: The First Woman (2023).

In 2019, Zamata launched the podcast Best Friends, which she hosts with her best friend and fellow comedian and actress Nicole Byer.

Zamata has acted in film and television including roles in I Feel Pretty (2018) and Spree (2020), and voice roles in The Mitchells vs. the Machines (2021) and Muppets Haunted Mansion (2021). In recent years, Zamata has starred in several television shows, including Woke (2020–2022) and Home Economics (2021–2023). She portrayed Jennifer Kale in the Disney+ Marvel Cinematic Universe show Agatha All Along (2024).

== Personal life ==
In 2009 through 2010, Zamata participated in and graduated from Public Allies, a nationwide AmeriCorps program dedicated to leadership development, in New York.

In 2024, Zamata came out as a lesbian.

=== ACLU and work with women's rights ===
Zamata was named a celebrity ambassador to the American Civil Liberties Union (ACLU) in 2015, and began work with the Women's Rights Project. The ACLU Women's Rights project seeks to break down gender biases and "ensure equal economic opportunities, educational equity, and an end to gender-based violence". She has spoken out on gender discrimination in the U.S. today, and has advocated for equal rights among women of color, in particular. In an interview with Allure, Zamata opened up about her experiences with discrimination and colorism. She has stated that although she has often been stigmatized for her darker skin tone, she hopes to turn her experiences into a message of self-acceptance and body positivity for women in all shades.

== Filmography ==
=== Film ===
Year	Title	Role	Notes
2005	Sticks and Stones		Short film
2009	Michelle Obama's Breaking Point	Michelle Obama	Short film
2010	Tyra Banks Exclusive 2010	Tyra Banks	Short film
2011	Subway Rush		Short film
2012	White Powder		Short film
2012	Three to One		Short film
2013	Black Superheroes		Short film
2013	Tie		Short film
2013	Best Buy Real Home Theater Experience		Short film
2013	Little Horribles		Short film
2014	The Re-Gift	ACE Party Girl	Short film
2014	The Crumb of It	Sasheer	Short film
2014	Intimate Semaphores	Sasheer	Segment "Cake"
2016	Sleight	Georgi	
2016	Yoga Hosers	Principal Invincible	
2017	Deidra & Laney Rob a Train	Ms. Spencer	
2017	The Outdoorsman	Mona	
2018	I Feel Pretty	Tasha	
2018	The Weekend	Zadie Barber	
2020	Spree	Jessie Adams	
2021	The Mitchells vs. the Machines	Jade	Voice
2023	Sasheer Zamata: The First Woman	Self	
2024	Unfrosted	Beth Donovan	
2026	Masters of the Universe	Suzie	

=== Television ===
Year	Title	Role	Notes
2010	Acid Tests	Karen	
2011	Beyonce as a Mommy	Beyoncé	
2011-2012	Jest Originals	Chelsea	Episode: "TOMS 'One 4 One' Gone Wrong"
2011-2012	Jest Originals	Blue Ivy	Episode: "Blue Ivy in the Nursery"
2012–2013	Fodder	Various	14 episodes
2012–2014	UCB Live!	Herself	
2012–2015	CollegeHumor Originals	Various	5 episodes
2012–2015	Dropout	Various	
2013	The Morning After	Herself	Episode: "Once You Go Black..."
2013	Thingstarter	Woman on Street	Episode: "iNotRacist"
2013	PITtv	Mom	Episode: "Gay-Doh"
2013	Above Average Presents	Various	3 episodes
2013	Would You Fall for That?	Herself	
2013–2014	Inside Amy Schumer	Sales Girl / Tess	2 episodes
2013–2015	UCB Comedy Originals	Various	9 episodes
2013–2015	Pursuit of Sexiness	Sheer	Main cast
2014	Dream Jobs	Madison	
2014–2017	Saturday Night Live	Herself/Various	Main cast; 74 episodes
2015	Lucas Bros. Moving Co.	Blackneficent	Voice, episode: "For the Love of Moving"
2016	Transparent	Asra	Episode: "Elizah"
2016	People of Earth	Marcy	Episode: "Significant Other"
2016	Albert	Maisie	Voice, television film
2016–2018	Night Train with Wyatt Cenac	Herself / Ghost of Shirley Chisholm	2 episodes
2017	The Special Without Brett Davis		Episode: "Raddisson"
2017	Sasheer Zamata: Pizza Mind	Herself	Internet streaming special
2017	BoJack Horseman	Jewelry Store Clerk	Voice, episode: "Ruthie"
2017	At Home with Amy Sedaris	Ms. Stern	Episode: "Making Love"
2017–2018	Loosely Exactly Nicole	Kim Whitfield	Recurring
2019	Corporate	Jessica	Recurring
2019	Full Frontal with Samantha Bee	Guest Correspondent	Episode: 110 (season 4)
2019	Historical Roasts	Rosa Parks	Episode: "Martin Luther King Jr."
2020	Finding Your Roots	Herself	Episode: "Homecomings"
2020	The Last O.G.	Isis	3 episodes
2020	Robbie	Ava	Main cast
2020	The George Lucas Talk Show	Herself	Episode: "Yoda Hosers"
2020	The Fungies!	Cool Mom / Mama Lemon	Voice, 2 episodes
2020–2022	Woke	Ayana	Main cast
2021	Tuca & Bertie	Kara (Voice)	7 episodes
2021	Muppets Haunted Mansion	Mary	TV special
2021	Grand Crew	Gloria	Episode: "Pilot"
2021–2023	Home Economics	Denise	Main cast
2023	Waco: The Aftermath	Angie Graham	4 episodes
2023–2025	Moon Girl and Devil Dinosaur	Adria Lafayette, Flying Fox	Voice, main cast
2024	Exploding Kittens	Devilcat	Voice, main cast
2024	Agatha All Along	Jennifer Kale	Main cast; also contributed to soundtrack
2025	Long Story Short	Jax (Voice)	
2025	Ghosts	Libby	2 episodes
2026	R.J. Decker	FBI Special Agent Melinda Winwood	Episode "The Point of Us Breaking"

=== Video Games ===
Year	Title	Role
2016	Call of Duty: Infinite Warfare: Zombies in Spaceland	Sally

=== Podcast ===
Year	Title	Role	Notes
2021	Operation Cordelia	Tracy	
