= Spree (film) =

2020 film by Eugene Kotlyarenko

- Theatrical release poster
- Directed by: Eugene Kotlyarenko
- Written by: Eugene Kotlyarenko; Gene McHugh
- Produced by: Matthew Budman; Sumaiya Kaveh; Eugene Kotlyarenko; John H. Lang
- Starring: Joe Keery; Sasheer Zamata; Mischa Barton; John DeLuca; Josh Ovalle; Lala Kent; Frankie Grande; Kyle Mooney; David Arquette
- Cinematography: Jeff Leeds Cohn
- Edited by: Benjamin Moses Smith
- Music by: James Ferraro
- Production companies: Forest Hill Entertainment; DreamCrew; SuperBloom
- Distributed by: RLJE Films
- Release dates: January 24, 2020 (Sundance); August 14, 2020 (United States)
- Running time: 93 minutes
- Country: United States
- Language: English
- Box office: $51,849

Spree is a 2020 American found footage black comedy horror film directed by Eugene Kotlyarenko. The gonzo-style satire follows a social media obsessed rideshare driver played by Joe Keery who, in an attempt to become a viral trash-streamer, livestreams himself murdering passengers. The film also stars Sasheer Zamata, David Arquette, Kyle Mooney and Mischa Barton. It was executive-produced by Drake.

Spree premiered on January 24, 2020, at the 2020 Sundance Film Festival as part of the NEXT category, and was released theatrically and via video on demand in the United States on August 14, 2020, by RLJE Films. The film received mixed reviews, though critics praised Keery's performance and the film's premise.

== Plot ==
In Southern California, a young man named Kurt Kunkle is obsessed with being a social media star and going viral. Another young man, Bobby, whom Kurt used to babysit, is now an internet celebrity who frequently makes livestreams and has high viewer numbers, making Kurt jealous. Kurt finds work as a driver for a rideshare app called Spree, then equips his car with cameras and begins a livestream entitled "The Lesson" to teach viewers how to become famous on social media.

To gain attention, Kurt picks up a passenger and kills him with a poisoned bottle of water. Despite this, he doesn't gain any viewers besides Bobby, who believes the killing is fake. Kurt then picks up a man named Mario and a woman named Jessie, a comedian with a large social media following. Kurt is awestruck by Jessie, but she is unimpressed by Kurt and his obsession with gaining followers and leaves the ride. After murdering Mario and several successive passengers, Kurt learns that Jessie will perform that night in a comedy show livestreamed to millions.

Kurt goes to Bobby's house and demands Bobby share Kurt's stream, but Bobby refuses and starts livestreaming their argument for his audience. Kurt kills Bobby, takes his gun, and begins livestreaming for Bobby's fans, who assume the murder is fake. Kurt's father Kris, a musician, asks him for a ride to a club where he will perform and where a famous Korean DJ called uNo is working, promising that the DJ will tag Kurt in a photo. Kurt picks up Kris and takes him to the club. Kurt approaches uNo, who initially refuses to tag him, but she then asks him to take her to a taco truck, promising to tag him if he does.

While waiting for Kurt to get her food from the truck, uNo discovers Bobby's gun and poses with it on a livestream before drinking some of the poisoned water and passing out. When Kurt discovers this, he attempts to drive away but is stopped by two police officers, who begin giving him a field sobriety test. uNo regains consciousness and panics, fatally shooting one of the officers before fleeing, pursued by the second officer. Kurt also flees, but he too is pursued by police, driving the wrong direction on a freeway. He loses his pursuers but crashes into a homeless encampment, demolishing his car.

Because of "The Rideshare Killer," Spree is temporarily shut down. Meanwhile, Kurt goes to see Jessie perform. She starts her show with a bit about her encounter with Kurt and how disgusted she is by people's desperation for social media fame. The set goes viral when she concludes it by destroying her phone on stage, followed by a mic drop. After she gets drunk, she is picked up by Kurt via another rideshare app called GoGo, using a car whose driver he has killed. Kurt tells her he is taking her to his house and gloats that since Jessie destroyed her phone on stage, she has no way of calling for help.

Unable to get out of the car, Jessie garrotes Kurt with a charger cable, but Kurt recovers and beats Jessie unconscious. He arrives at his house and places Jessie's body outside before being requested by his now-eager viewers to kill her. Distracted by a faulty camera, Kurt doesn't notice Jessie regain consciousness. She takes control of the car and crashes into Kurt's house while trying to run him over. Kris arrives and finds the body of Kurt's mother, whom Kurt killed prior to beginning "The Lesson.” Kurt shoots his father dead and attempts to kill Jessie, who crushes Kurt against a wall with the car and bashes his head with his phone. Kurt's viewers persuade Jessie to take a selfie with his dead body and post it on her Instagram account.

After taking credit for ending Kurt's rampage, Jessie becomes a nationwide star, while Kurt and his killings become revered in certain corners of the internet like 4chan and Reddit. A user on one of these channels announces that Kurt's killings have been compiled into a film entitled Spree.

== Cast ==
- Joe Keery as Kurt Kunkle
- Sasheer Zamata as Jessie Adams
- David Arquette as Kris Kunkle
- Kyle Mooney as Miles Manderville
- Mischa Barton as London Sachs
- Sunny Kim as DJ uNo
- Frankie Grande as Richard Venti
- Josh Ovalle as Bobby BaseCamp
- Lala Kent as Kendra Sheraton
- John DeLuca as Mario Papazian
- Jessalyn Gilsig as Andrea Archer
- Mohammad Tiregar as khaby

== Production ==
Filming occurred in February 2019 around Los Angeles, California. Keery worked closely with Kotlyarenko to understand his character, and the pair filmed in-character social media posts such as unboxing videos, shopping trips and vape reviews. As research the cast also spent hours watching content from influencers on YouTube, Instagram and TikTok.

== Release ==
Spree premiered at the Sundance Film Festival on January 24, 2020. Shortly after, distributor RLJE Films paid $2 million to acquire the rights to the film. It was released in the United States in theaters and via VOD on August 14, 2020. It was released on DVD and Blu-ray on October 20, 2020. In late 2020 Spree was put onto Hulu. In May 2022, the film was made available on various platforms like Apple TV.

== Reception ==
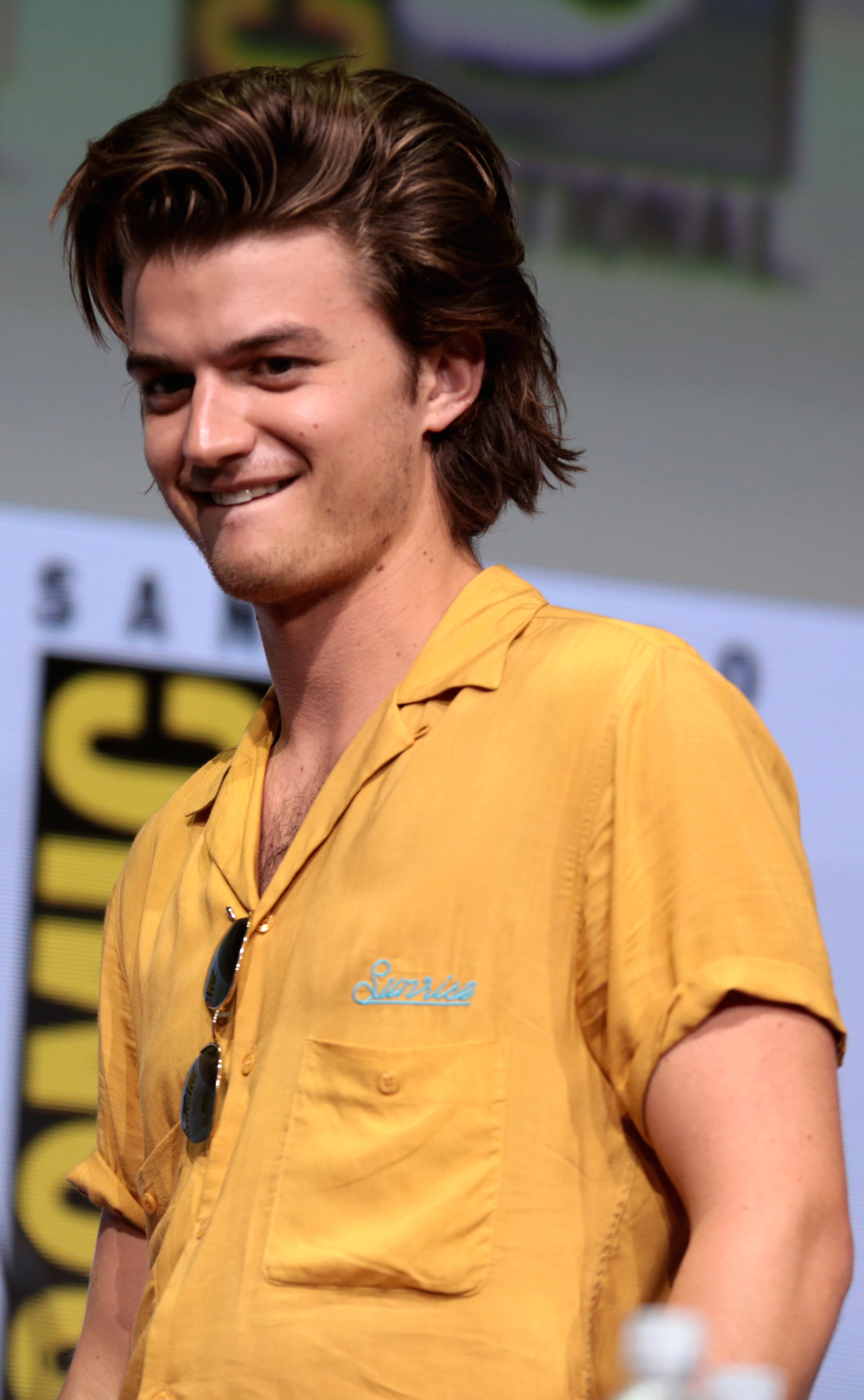
Joe Keery received praise for his performance.

On the review aggregator Rotten Tomatoes, the film holds an approval rating of 67%, based on 79 reviews, with an average rating of 6/10. The website's critics consensus reads: "Joe Keery's magnetic screen presence can't disguise Spree's shallow critique of social media culture -- although that lack of depth may be precisely the point." On Metacritic the film has a weighted average score of 41 out of 100, based on 14 critics, indicating "mixed or average reviews".

John DeFore of The Hollywood Reporter praised Keery's performance, saying: "Stranger Things' sneakily charming Joe Keery gets the spotlight here, balancing the character's contradictory aspects (dork, fumbling people pleaser, psychopath) with ease" and "[to] the extent that it works, much credit goes to Keery, for finding the real human need inside this twentysomething cipher." Dan Jackson of Thrillist also praised Keery's performance, writing: "One of the best parts of Keery's performance is the way he plays the strange combination of naive earnestness and calculated cynicism that drives a person like Kurt to act in such a desperate manner, begging for followers and turning every awkward interaction into an opportunity to hawk his cringe-inducing brand."

Jessica Kiang of Variety gave the film a negative review, saying: "If you are in need of more reminders of the most extreme of the potential evils of internet interaction than you get every time you fire up an app, by all means, smash the like button on Spree. For the rest of us, the best advice might be to mute, block, vote down, unfollow or simply log off and go look at a tree."
