= 0s & 1s =

- Directed by: Eugene Kotlyarenko
- Written by: Eugene Kotlyarenko; Michael Shifflett; Morgan Krantz
- Produced by: Michael Shifflett
- Starring: Morgan Krantz; Jeremy Blackman; Ryan Reyes; Matty Cardarople; Ahna O'Reilly; Alexi Wasser
- Cinematography: Marcus Gillis
- Edited by: Drew King; Eugene Kotlyarenko
- Music by: Joseph Paul Alvarado
- Production company: YGK
- Distributed by: Instrum International
- Release date: 2011
- Running time: 86 minutes
- Country: United States
- Language: English

0s & 1s is a 2011 American comedy-drama film directed by Eugene Kotlyarenko, starring Morgan Krantz, Jeremy Blackman, Ryan Reyes, Matty Cardarople, Ahna O'Reilly and Alexi Wasser.

== Cast ==
- Morgan Krantz as James Pongo
- Jeremy Blackman as Sam
- Ryan Reyes as Cole
- Matty Cardarople as Donny
- Ahna O'Reilly as Caitlin
- Alexi Wasser as Becky
- Sarah Blakley-Cartwright as Sarah
- Romy Walthall as Bossy
- Mara LaFontaine as Sammy
- Hannah Hunt as Cassie
- Tysen D'Eston as Bucky
- Brandan Halpin as Dean
- Christian Kamongi as Jeremiah
- Andy Kozel as Brian
- Alex Lewis as Daniel
- Nicholas Mongiardo-Cooper as Norm
- Whitmer Thomas as Corey

== Reception ==
Neil Genzlinger of The New York Times wrote, "The point, which is probably that we're losing ourselves, and our "self," in our electronic devices, isn't particularly new, but the way it's delivered is pretty interesting."

Andrew Schenker of The Village Voice wrote that the film "goes beyond merely communicating what it feels like to have one's consciousness colonized by spectacle, employing its exhaustive catalog of new media in instructive ways."

Ronnie Scheib of Variety wrote that Kotlyarenko "plays with format in an attempt to mitigate the boring sameness of James' encounters, trusting, like too many indie auteurs, that the audience's recognition of its own peculiar demographic reality precludes the need for a script."

Nick Schager of Slant Magazine rated the film 0.5 stars out of 4 and wrote that the film "negates its own critique by so gleefully reveling in the grating digital detritus it pretends to censure."
