= Sex House =

American parody television series (2012)

- Genre: Parody; Satire; Reality television Horror
- Written by: Sam West; Sam Kemmis; Geoff Haggerty; Matt Klinman; Chris Sartinsky; Michael Pielocik
- Directed by: Geoff Haggerty
- Starring: Chris Agos; Lea Pascal; Chris Boykin; Fiona Robert; Jesse Dabson; Boyd Harris; Ashley Lobo
- Music by: Pond5
- Country of origin: United States
- Original language: English
- No. of seasons: 1
- No. of episodes: 10

Production
- Executive producers: Geoff Haggerty; Grant Jones
- Producers: Sandy Gordon; Sarah Miller
- Cinematography: Mark Niedelson
- Editors: George Zwierzynski Jr. Robert Stockwell; Max Gold; Drew Hall; Suzie Moore
- Running time: 6–8 minutes
- Production company: Onion Digital Studios

Original release
- Network: YouTube
- Release: July 12 – September 13, 2012

Sex House is an American reality television parody web series produced by Onion Digital Studios. Its ten episodes were released on YouTube from July 12 to September 13, 2012. A parody of reality television series such as MTV's The Real World, Sex House follows three men and three women who move into a large house called the "Sex House" together for three months to have sex with each other. They soon realize that they are trapped within the house, which is quickly deteriorating as their health declines, and they have to fight against the show's producers and host to survive. It was lauded by critics, who praised it for its dark satire, its editing, tone, and camerawork being accurate to an actual reality television series, and its cast.

== Plot ==
Sex House follows a fictional cast of three men—Jay, Derek, and Frank—and three women—Tara, Erin, and Alex—and their time in the eponymous house, where they are slated to spend three months together having as much sex as possible. The characters are initially depicted as reality show stereotypes, with Jay as a bro and a jock, Erin as a virginal girl next door, Derek as a token gay man, and Tara as a party girl, with Frank, a middle-aged man who won a pizza contest to be on the show, included as an outlier. After Frank has sex with Erin and gets her pregnant, the tone of the show becomes darker as the housemates, particularly Derek, soon realize they are completely trapped in the house, with no food other than moldy pumpernickel, and are being coerced into having sex by the producers and the nameless host in order to survive. The host takes various unsuccessful measures to push the cast into having sex with each other before they eventually revolt against production and form their own society within the house.

== Episodes ==
No.	Title	Original release date
1	"Meet the Nymphos"	July 12, 2012
Six guests arrive at the Sex House, a mansion where they will live for three months to have "consequence-free sex" with each other: Jay, a bro type from Gainesville, Florida; Alex, a hypersexual alternative girl; Tara, a party girl; Erin, a recent high school graduate from a small town; Frank, a 45-year-old senior accountant who won a Tombstone Pizza contest to be on Sex House; and Derek, a black gay man who quickly becomes frustrated after learning no other gay men were cast on the show. The six meet and soon start drinking excessively, prompting Alex to hit on Derek and make out with Tara. Erin shares with the rest of the house that she is a virgin. Frank and her dance together before going upstairs, where they have sex.
2	"Sexy Truth or Sexy Dare"	July 19, 2012
The morning after Erin and Frank have sex, the guests receive a basket full of food alongside a "sext" from producers congratulating the two. Tara gets burnt by a gust of extremely hot air from a vent in the kitchen and Derek figures out that the temperature in the house is being regulated by intensely hot and cold blasts of air in intervals. Erin tries to take her mind off of losing her virginity by watching TV, only to find that all of the channels in the Sex House only play pornography, while Derek attempts to leave the house to go for a walk but discovers that the doors are locked and the windows are boarded up. During a game of truth or dare, Jay shares that he wants to have sex with Tara and the two dry hump, which causes Erin to run out screaming. Tara also realizes that the only food they have in the house is pumpernickel.
3	"Get on That Pole!"	July 26, 2012
Jay and Tara try to have sex but a rotting smell underneath the floorboards distracts them. A maintenance man brings a Sybian into the house. Derek tries to call a house meeting about all of the clocks running at different speeds but is interrupted by comedian Danny Vullmer, who announces that the girls will be taking pole dancing lessons with instructor Kamila Edwards. Derek and Jay fight while "broing out" with Danny Vullmer, who repeatedly makes jabs at Frank, while Alex and Tara fight about Alex being too sexual during the pole dance lesson. A blast of hot air blows from a vent while Kamila is on the pole, causing her to fall and have a tibial open fracture. Crew members carry her out of the house and Derek says that they need to devise an escape plan out of the Sex House or else they might die. The guests receive a "sext" challenging them to have sex for a prize and Frank tosses the tablet against the wall in anger.
4	"Erin Bares It All"	August 2, 2012
Garbage starts to pile up in the Sex House due to the housemates being unable to leave and the pumpernickel has molded. The show's host arrives at the house to greet everyone, though none of the housemates know who he is, and he announces that they will be doing a "sexy" photoshoot with photographer Soren Damgaard. Soon, Derek grabs a marker and draws Muhammad on his forehead, announcing that he will no longer be taking part in the show's filming. Tara and Jay go on the couch to have sex with each other but are interrupted by the host, causing them to realize that they were being manipulated by production to have sex, so they agree not to. Erin shares with Frank that she is pregnant with his child.
5	"Banana Sex Olympics"	August 9, 2012
A doctor comes to the Sex House to examine the housemates and determines that they are all severely malnourished and dehydrated. Derek has been shackled to the stairs as punishment for drawing Muhammad on his forehead. The host has a box of bananas brought in to feed them and announces that the prize for their next challenge will be a heated fruit cup, which Erin realizes is the closest thing to prenatal vitamins that she can get in the house and becomes determined to win. When Alex tries to use the Sybian to seduce the host, she finds out it is broken, and when a repairman enters through the front door and forgets to close it, Frank sprints out until being apprehended by crew members.
6	"Dr. Sex"	August 16, 2012
The pile of bananas that the crew left is now rotting and attracting flies and one of the bedrooms has been overtaken by mold. The host arrives and Derek reads off a list of demands from the housemates, to which he responds that if they agree to have more sex then he might be able to accommodate their requests. The crew brings in a tank full of frogs to deal with the flies and the host tells the housemates that they will be playing Twister while oiled up in exchange for seeing a therapist, who turns out to be fraudulent and only there to convince them to have sex. Frank goes to speak to the therapist, who roleplays as his wife and seduces him. They start having sex until the housemates come to warn him that she is not a real therapist and find him naked on the bed. They later find out that Frank impregnated the therapist.
7	"Sex in a Bottle"	August 23, 2012
The housemates are delirious from drinking bottles of a cloudy liquid that the host has supplied them. He tells them that their next challenge is to have sex with each other and tries to get Derek and Jay to have sex and to orchestrate a catfight between Alex and Erin, but both attempts fail. Tara becomes close with the frogs and feeds one of them the cloudy drink, which kills it. When the host arrives, Tara remembers that the drink kills frogs and tells the rest of the cast. He tries to force the drink in her mouth but she pushes his hand away and it gets in his eyes, blinding him. He is carried off by crew members in a fury. The housemates all induce vomiting to purge themselves of the drugged liquid and announce to a camera that they are done with the show. An anonymous voice tells them over a speaker to "prepare for mist" as a mist that knocks them all out fills the house.
8	"Orgy Scheming"	August 30, 2012
The housemates, now pallid and gaunt, have private meetings about an "orgy", which is actually an escape plan. Alex goes to use the Sybian while pretending to flirt with Jay and announces that it is broken, asking production to come fix it. When a repairman shows up, Derek and Jay apprehend him and chain him inside of the moldy bedroom as the rest of the cast members grab his tools to try and break out of the house. A large masked man wielding a club suddenly enters the house and the cast and camera crew, except for Erin and Frank, run into a room to hide from him. Frank saves Erin from being clubbed and ends up getting brutally clubbed by the masked man himself, after which Frank knocks the man out with a glass bottle. The housemates go to the moldy bedroom to release the repairman, who has been killed by the mold. The voice from the speaker demands that they have sex and, in an act of defiance, Frank hammers off his penis.
9	"Sex Climax"	September 6, 2012
Network executives, frustrated by the housemates' refusal to have sex, decide to cease production on Sex House. Abandoned by the network, the housemates form their own society within the house. Alex tends to Derek, who has gotten sick, and controls the mold; Jay has become chief barley horticulturist; and Erin has given birth to her son, Danny Vullmer, Jr. The house now measures time in "Crysts". A house meeting is called to discuss eating the frogs, to whom Tara has grown immensely close with, due to the barley running low after experiencing blight. Alex argues that Derek will die otherwise and Erin says her baby needs protein, but Tara protests. As they are about to sacrifice a frog, Tara runs in to try and stop them and knocks over a wooden plank covering a window, revealing the outside world to them. They stare at the light and decide to put the plank back up. They gather back around as Tara prepares to kill the frog, determining that it is "the sexy thing to do".
10	"Reunion"	September 13, 2012
The housemates all return for a reunion episode. Erin has given her baby up for adoption and is now a blogger. Frank has divorced from his wife and moved to Los Angeles, and he and Jay now blog about the script they wrote together, "The Big Chill", about two best friends who both have sex with a virgin. Derek has become heterosexual and works as a maître d'hôtel at a Coolio-owned hotel and also runs a blog about the lessons he learns from Coolio. Tara now delivers the mold from the house, which was discovered by scientists to be an effective vaccine for Dengue fever, to people and blogs about Filipino cuisine. Alex has been dating a man named Paul for eight months, who, the host reveals to her, was actually the anonymous voice from the speakers in the Sex House. The finale ends with an announcement for Sex House: San Diego, a fictional spin-off starring the frogs from the Sex House.

== Cast ==
=== Main ===
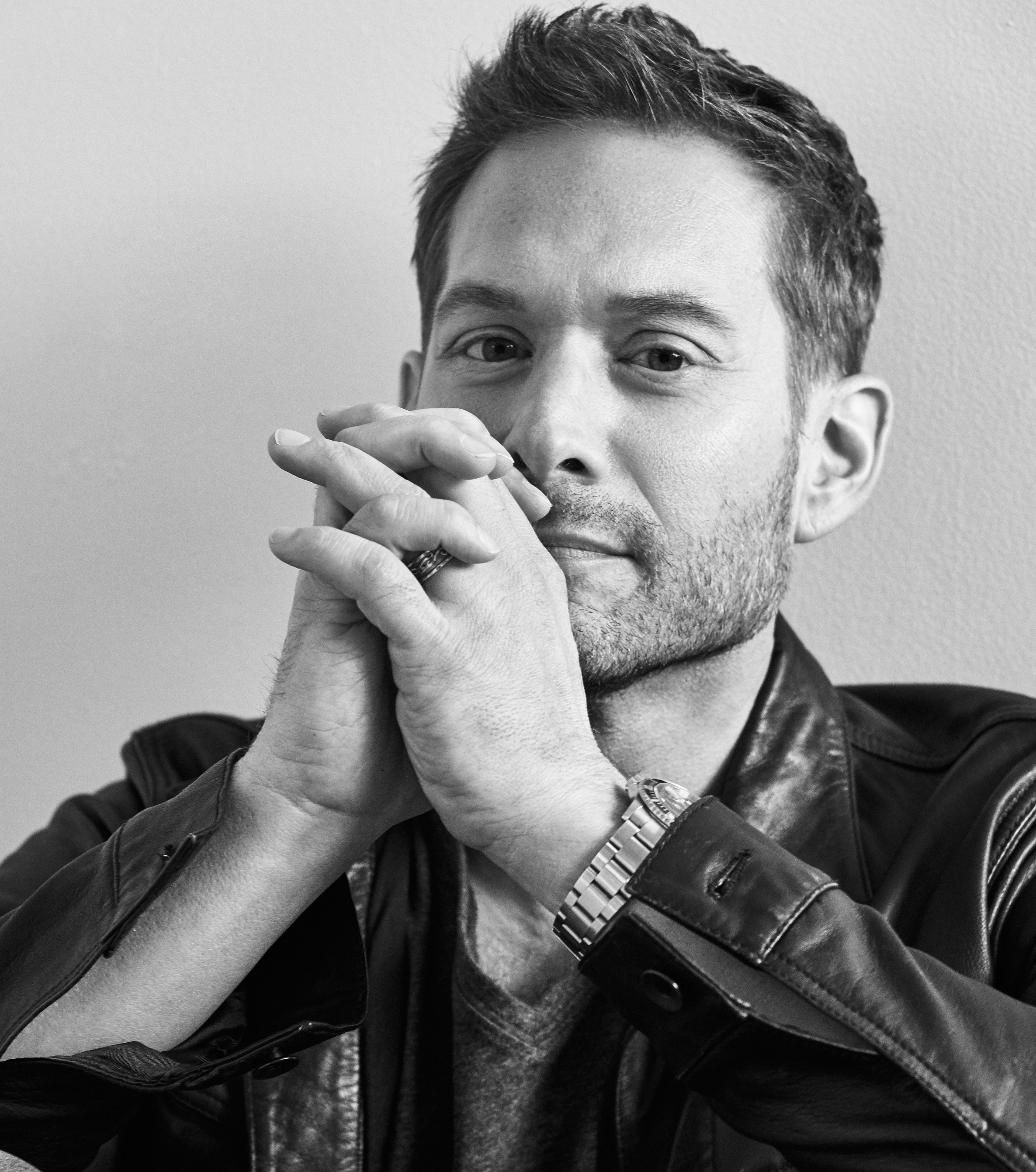
Chris Agos plays the host of Sex House

- Lea Pascal as Alex, an indie nymphomaniac
- Chris Boykin as Derek, a gay man who did not know there would be no other gay men in the Sex House
- Jesse Dabson as Frank, a married 45-year-old accountant with two twin daughters who won a Tombstone pizza contest to appear on Sex House
- Fiona Robert as Erin, a naive 18-year-old virgin from a small town
- Ashley Lobo as Tara, an ex-cheerleader and party girl
- Boyd Harris as Jay, a bro from Gainesville, Florida
- Chris Agos as the show's nameless host

=== Guest ===
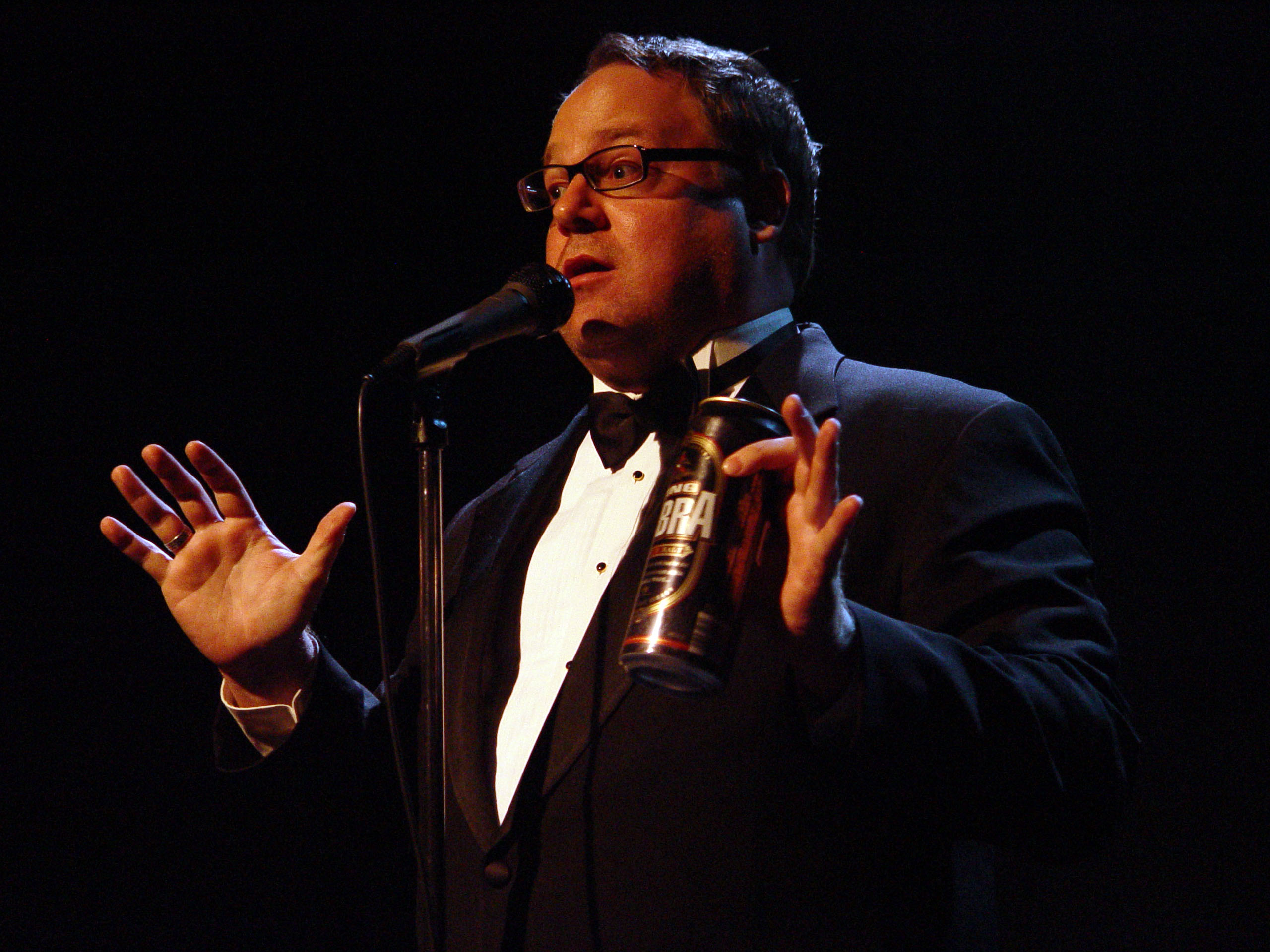
Chris Meister appears as comedian Danny Vullmer

- Chris Meister as Danny Vullmer, a panelist on Chelsea Lately and clip researcher for Ridiculousness who roasts the housemates
- Linda Costoff as Kamila Edwards, a pole dance instructor
- Patrick Zielinski as Paul Hamlin, the voice that speaks on the speakers throughout the Sex House and Alex's eventual partner
- Tim Stoltenberg as Soren Damgaard, a photographer
- Andrew Krukowski as the Sybian repairman
- Ripper Brown as the masked goon
- Sean Bradley as the doctor
- Colleen O'Neil as the therapist
- Josephine Fox, Kim DeGraaf, Sam Meadows, and Pearl Paramadilok as Dengue fever survivors

== Production ==
Sex House was the first production by The Onion's digital, non-news sector, Onion Digital Studios, which partnered with YouTube's premium content program to fund its series and launched simultaneously with the release of Sex House's first episode, "Meet the Nymphos", on YouTube on July 12, 2012. It was one of four series by Onion Digital Studios to run that summer, the others being Troublehacking with Drew Cleary, Horrifying Planet, and Helcomb County Municipal Lake Dredge Appraisal. Sex House spanned ten six- to ten-minute-long episodes uploaded to The Onion's YouTube channel throughout 2012, with its finale premiering on September 13, 2012. Its writers were Sam Kemmis, Geoff Haggerty, Matt Klinman, Chris Sartinsky, Sam West, and Michael Pielocik. Mark Niedelson, its director of photography, had previously worked on a season of the MTV reality television series The Real World—The Real World: Paris—of which Sex House is a parody, among other MTV reality television series like Jersey Shore and Road Rules and the CBS reality television series Big Brother.

In late 2012, the first episode of Sex House had more than three and a half million views while its last episode had almost 300 thousand. By 2021, the series's first episode had gained over 33 million views on YouTube. Sex House also played in its entirety at the found footage-themed Unnamed Footage Festival in 2023.

== Critical reception ==
Alison Willmore of IndieWire wrote that the first episode of Sex House "manages to land some solid punches" despite it having become "so easy" to mock reality television by 2012 that "it ha[d] perversely become almost impossible", praising the character of Frank as "a genius addition" to the show. Also for IndieWire, Alison Abrams wrote that the show had a "dark edge" and became "a Sartre-esque nightmare". Adam Frucci, for Vulture, also wrote that its first episode was "amazing" and "as pitch-perfect a parody of MTV reality shows as the Onion News Network is of cable news". Mediaite's Jon Bershad lauded Sex House's first episode as "dead on, dark, and damn funny" and wrote that it "hilariously strips away all that 'start being real' nonsense" from The Real World. Jezebel's Madeleine Davies wrote after its first episode that Sex House was "the perfect fake reality show" which "captur[ed] the ridiculousness of The Real World, Jersey Shore and The Bachelor combined".

Drew Grant, for Observer, called its first episode "stellar" and wrote that its second episode, whose "dark" twist "leaves you feeling a little sick inside", "manage[d] to keep itself on track" with its satire and avoidance of "absurdest [sic] slapstick" despite "never quite liv[ing] up to the 'Tombstone pizza contest' line" in the first episode. After its finale, Max Read of Gawker called Sex House "the best show of the summer" of 2012, whose satire succeeded due to "its fluency in the language of reality entertainment" and "the clear affection the show's creators have for The Real World and its descendents", which, he wrote, made it "so much more effective than reality-television allegories like Hunger Games". Read gave particular praise to the show's cast, editing, camerawork, and musical cues and described its tone as "dark" and "J.G. Ballard-rewrites-No Exit".

Jacobin's Gavin Mueller wrote that Sex House took a "less conventional", "more radical" approach to satirizing reality television by "tak[ing] the side of the workers, the reality show contestants themselves, in their battle against their oppressive working conditions", that it "correctly represent[s] the class struggle as one between cast and producers", and that it "argues that free contracts are a myth". He also called its reunion show its "darkest moment" for being "an exercise in revisionism". In an interview with former Onion staff writer Jen Spyra in 2021, Vulture's Ian Goldstein wrote that the look, tone, and casting of Sex House was so accurate "that if it weren't from the Onion, it might seem like a network-created reality show", with its "quick cuts with random, unnecessary zoom-ins, unnecessary conflicts, and distinct personae for each housemate", and that it was "a must-watch for any comedy (or horror) fan". Spyra called it "one of the funniest things [she had] ever seen" and "an emotionally honest story that stands on its own" with "sharp, specific comedy writing" and "characters that ... you end up caring about". She also stated that it "works so well" as satire because it targeted "the exploitative nature of reality-TV producers and the bottomless, amoral appetite of American TV-watchers" instead of attacking "the sweet, dopey housemates".
