= Matty Cardarople =

American actor (born 1983)

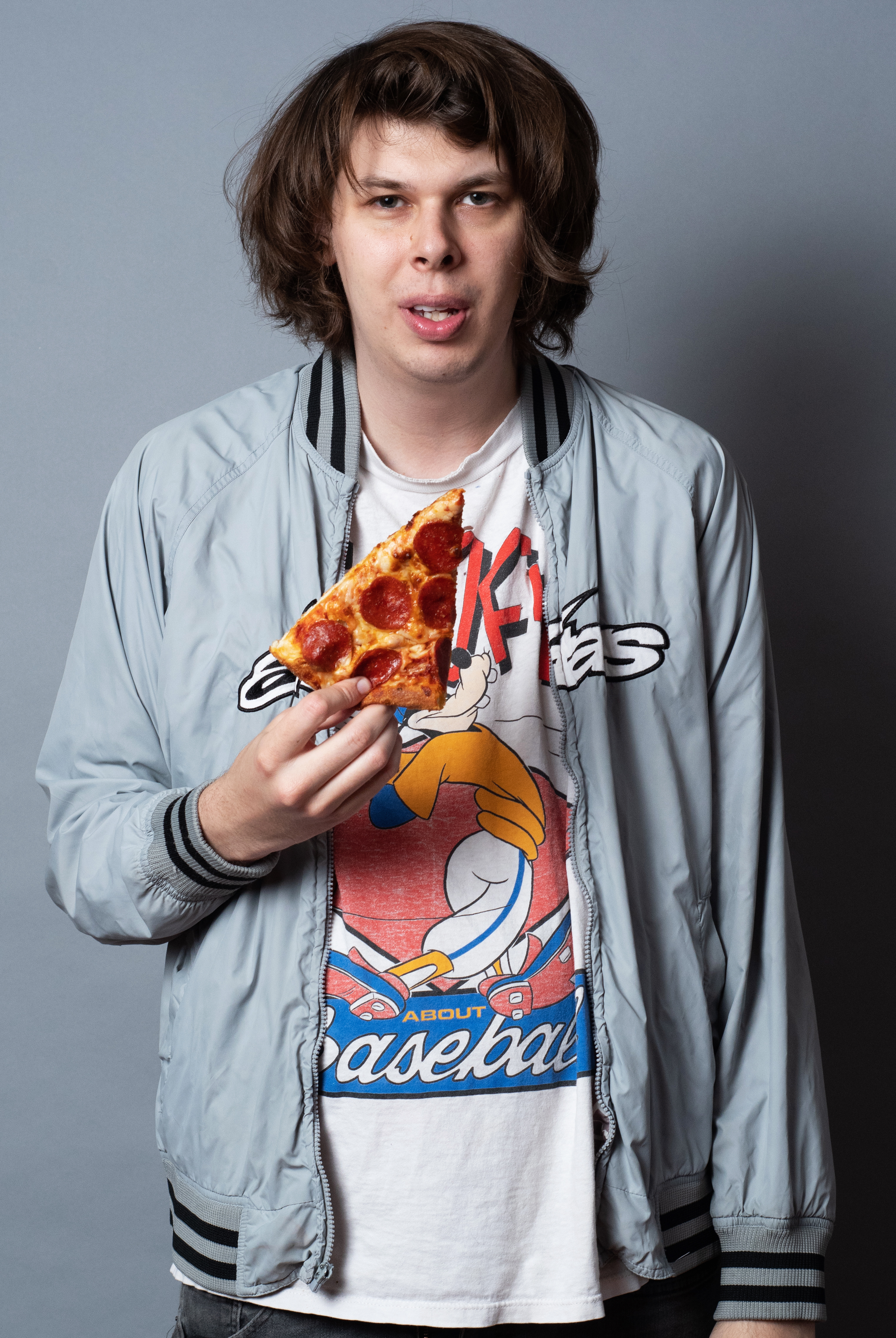
- Born: February 9, 1983 (age 43); Exeter, New Hampshire, U.S.
- Education: New York Film Academy
- Occupations: Actor; comedian
- Years active: 2004–present
- Spouse: Lauren (m. 2017)

Matthew Richard Cardarople (born February 9, 1983) is an American actor and comedian. He is usually typecast as nerds or individuals with socially awkward traits illustrating American kitsch culture. He has appeared in the ABC television series Selfie, the 2015 film Jurassic World, the 2016 TV series Stranger Things as Keith, a worker at the Hawkins arcade, and as the "Henchperson of Indeterminate Gender" in the TV series A Series of Unfortunate Events. In 2021, he played a secondary role in the film Free Guy. His supporting roles include appearances in Michael Showalter's 2017 romantic comedy The Big Sick, and Sterlin Harjo and Taika Waititi's TV series Reservation Dogs.

== Early life and education ==
Cardarople was born in Exeter, New Hampshire. His parents divorced when he was young. He graduated from Exeter High School in 2001 and is a graduate of New York Film Academy, after which he worked as a personal assistant for Luke Wilson. Cardarople studied acting at The Beverly Hills Playhouse. He studied with Lesly Kahn.

== Career ==
His career began with features in the films Blonde Ambition and Drillbit Taylor. He was discovered by Luke and Owen Wilson.

He starred as a recurring guest on ABC's Selfie. He appeared in Netflix's adaptation of A Series of Unfortunate Events, which premiered in 2017.

He appeared in the films Jurassic World and Dumb and Dumber To. His credits include roles in the indie comedy The 4th, The Big Sick, the Steven Soderbergh-directed film Logan Lucky and other films such as Itsy Bitsy and I am Woman.

On television, Cardarople has appeared on shows such as NCIS: LA, New Girl, NCIS: Naval Criminal Investigative Service, Angie Tribeca, Scrubs, Ray Donovan, You're The Worst, Comedy Bang! Bang!, Selfie and Chasing Life.

== Personal life ==
Cardarople was born deaf and developed hearing at age 3. At age 18, he was diagnosed with Marfan syndrome and was told he would not live past 25. At age 27 he underwent successful heart surgery and is now "100% healthy". He also has ADHD.

Cardarople married his wife, Lauren, in 2017. On March 1, 2021, Cardarople suffered a stroke from a hole in his heart but fully recovered.

== Filmography ==
=== Film ===
Year	Title	Role	Notes
2008	Drillbit Taylor	7-11 clerk	
2009	Absolute Evil	Photographer	
2011	0s and 1s	Donny	
2012	The Three Stooges	Cameraman	Uncredited
2014	Dumb and Dumber To	Inventor #1	
2015	Scouts Guide to the Zombie Apocalypse	Unknown zombie	
2015	Jurassic World	Gyrosphere operator	
2016	20th Century Women	Bartender	
2017	The Big Sick	Stu	
2017	Logan Lucky	CMS police officer #2	
2017	Please Stand By	Geeksquad #1	
2019	Itsy Bitsy	Donny	
2019	I Am Woman	Roy Meyer	
2020	Lazy Susan	Roger	
2020	Wheels of Fortune	Noodle	
2021	Free Guy	Keith	
2021	The Cleaner	Donny	
2021	Night Night	Lucas Willard	
2023	American Cherry	Clay Elliot	
2024	Saving Bikini Bottom: The Sandy Cheeks Movie	Kyle	
2024	Carved	Clint	
2025	A Farewell To Youth	Matty Costello	
2026	Quarter	Kyle	Post-production
2026	The Man with the Bag	Joe	Post-production

=== Television ===
Year	Title	Role	Notes
2010	Scrubs	Frank	Episode: "Our Driving Issues"
2012	Gayle	Marty	Episode: "The SATs"
2014	Tim & Eric's Bedtime Stories	Teenager	Episode: "Toes"
2014	Comedy Bang! Bang!	D-Money	2 episodes
2014	Selfie	Charlie	8 episodes
2016	Angie Tribeca	Files room worker	Episode: "A Coldie but a Goodie"
2016	New Girl	Carl	Episode: "Heat Wave"
2016	NCIS	Clerk	Episode: "The Numerical Limit"
2017–2019	A Series of Unfortunate Events	Henchperson of Indeterminate Gender	18 episodes
2017–2019	Stranger Things	Keith	3 episodes
2019–2021	Archibald's Next Big Thing	Preston (voice)	12 episodes
2019–2023	NCIS: Los Angeles	Danny	3 episodes
2020	Monsterland	Frank White	Episode: "New Orleans, LA"
2021	The Rookie	Slim Jim	Episode: "Bad Blood"
2021	Made for Love	Remy	Episode: "I Want a Lawyer"
2021–2023	Reservation Dogs	Ansel	8 episodes
2024	Fallout	Huey	Episode: "The Ghouls"
2024	Ghosts	Jamie	Episode: "Halloween 4: The Witch"
2026	Stuart Fails to Save the Universe	Keith	2 episodes
