= Livescreamers =

2023 American horror film

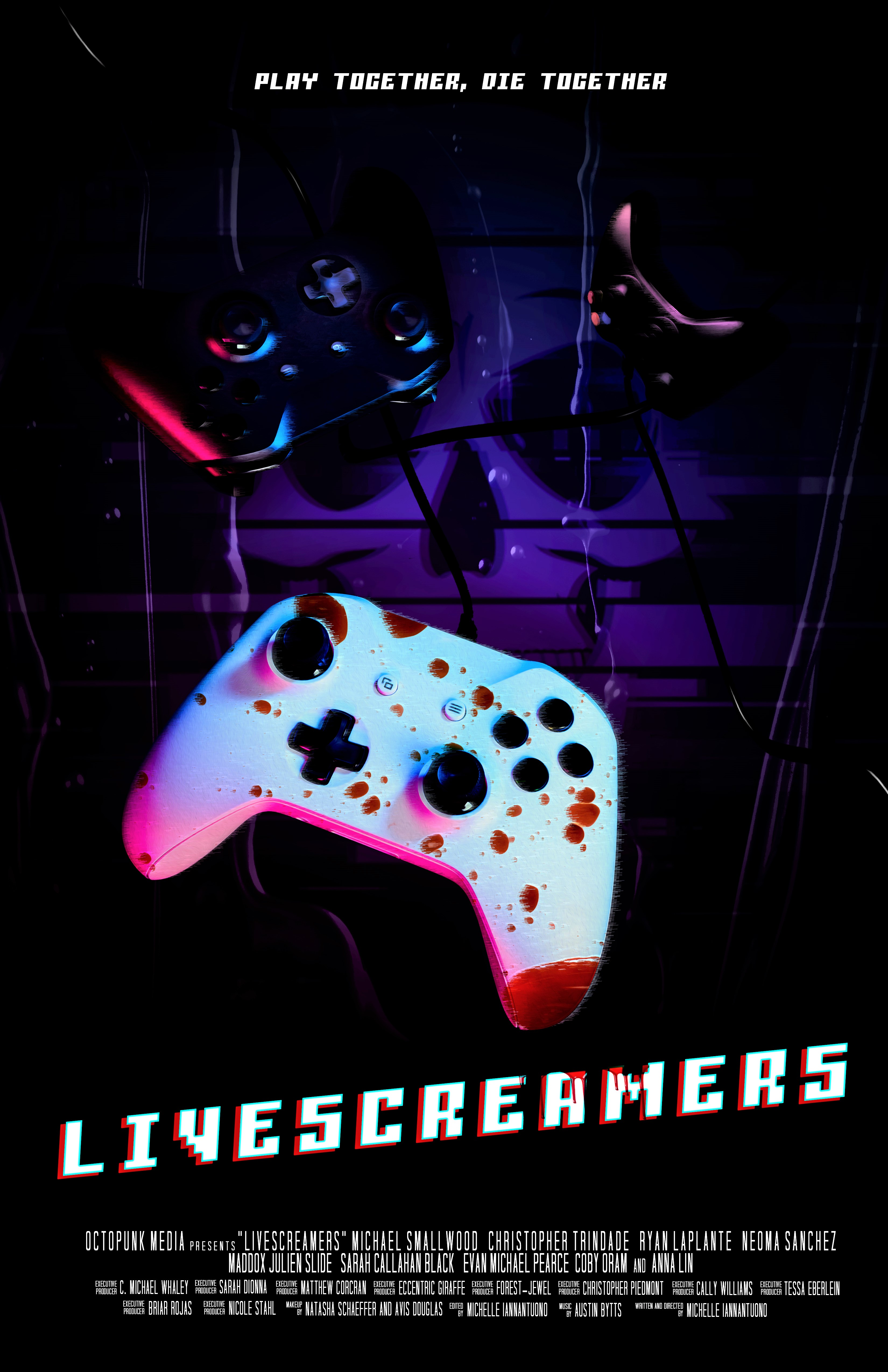
- Release Poster
- Directed by: Michelle Iannantuono
- Written by: Michelle Iannantuono
- Produced by: Michelle Iannantuono
- Starring: Michael Smallwood; Christopher Trindade; Ryan LaPlante; Maddox-Julien Slide; Evan Michael Pearce; Neoma Sanchez
- Edited by: Michelle Iannantuono
- Music by: Landon Knoblock; Austin Bytts; Sophia Stone
- Production company: Octopunk Media
- Distributed by: Octopunk Media
- Release dates: September 2023 (GenreBlast Film Festival); September 27, 2024
- Running time: 90 minutes
- Country: United States
- Language: English

Livescreamers is a 2023 American screenlife horror film written and directed by Michelle Iannantuono. It stars Michael Smallwood, Christopher Trindade, Maddox-Julien Slide, Ryan LaPlante, Evan Michael Pearce, and Neoma Sanchez. The film was released in the United States and United Kingdom on video on demand, and worldwide on Blu-ray, on September 27, 2024.

The film is a sequel to the 2018 film Livescream, also directed by Iannantuono.

== Synopsis ==
The film centers on a group of video game content creators: leader Mitch, the husband and wife team of Taylor and Gwen, an LGBTQ+ player named Dice, an energetic Nintendo fan named Zelda, the somewhat withdrawn Nemo, and Jon, who plays games while his friend Davey watches. They are joined by one of their fans, Lucy, who won the chance to play a haunted multiplayer game where players must escape or die. They begin playing the game and things are initially jovial, despite the appearance of a NPC version of Davey. They find this odd, but Jon decides to flirt with the NPC as he and Davey are "shipped" together by their fans.

The group quickly realizes that dying during the game will kill them in real life after a trivia game gone wrong results in Zelda's death. They are given little time to mourn, as the game immediately reveals texts showing that Taylor was grooming minors and that Mitch had covered this up in order to prevent a scandal. The group is killed off one by one as various issues and betrayals are revealed. Dice is upset over Jon and Davey exploiting their ship while fans continually misgender them, while Mitch confesses that the channel is deeply in debt and that he has in turn exploited all of them in order to keep viewers entertained. Nemo also talks about a parasocial fan who took advantage of his kindness and traumatized him to the point where he was unable to directly interact with fans. The remaining survivors also learn that a similar situation has happened before and that Mitch deliberately sought out the game in hopes of avoiding closing the channel. They manage to find a safe room where they learn that the game is controlled by a siren and that they must cut out its heart in order to escape.

The deaths continue until only Lucy and Nemo are left. The two team up and overpower the siren, gaining the key to the exit. As they try to leave they discover that only one can exit and that the game wants them to duel to the death. Nemo refuses to participate and discovers a second option: he and Lucy can choose to burn down the house. They will both die, however doing so brings the chance of releasing the souls of everyone the siren has ever killed and putting an end to its supernatural games forever. Before giving her answer Lucy reveals that she is the parasocial fan and that she had come in hopes of reigniting her friendship with Nemo. Horrified, Nemo kills Lucy before realizing what he has done. The film ends with Nemo as the only survivor as the police approach the studio, with the implication that he will be blamed for all of the deaths.

== Cast ==
- Michael Smallwood as Nemo
- Christopher Trindade as Jon
- Maddox-Julien Slide as Dice
- Evan Michael Pearce as Davey
- Ryan LaPlante as Mitch
- Neoma Sanchez as Lucy
- Sarah Callahan Black as Gwen
- Coby Oram as Taylor (credited as Coby C. Oram)
- Anna Lin as Zelda
- Kristopher Bosch as The Voice of The House
- Paul Warren as Tour Guide
- Marissa Clay as Bomb Instructor
- Tim Troemner as Game Show Host
- Charlie Kaufman as Jeremy

== Production ==
Iannantuono was inspired by her own years as a public figure on the internet, saying "It was a reflection of my life after years of becoming a creator myself, having my own audience and experiencing invasive dynamics, as well as navigating the waters of asking for money in an ethical way."

== Release ==
Livescreamers had its world premiere at GenreBlast Film Festival in September 2023, where it won the Audience Award, Best Screenplay in a Feature and Best Ensemble .

It also was the recipient of the George A. Romero Fellowship at Salem Horror Film Festival.

It is set to be released on VOD and Blu-ray by Octopunk Media on September 27, 2024.

== Reception ==
The film received generally positive reviews and currently sits at 91% on Rotten Tomatoes with 11 reviews. Mary Beth McAndrews of Dread Central described the film as "video game horror filmmaking at its finest and most innovative," while Matt Donato of Bloody Disgusting said, "Iannantuono's voice as a filmmaker is transfixingly confident."

Paul Lê wrote a critical review, saying, "A lot goes on in Livescreamers. Too much, in fact. Iannantuono crams a great deal into a relatively small space, and little of that is given the reverence and attention it deserves. As for performances, those are mixed all across the board."

== Livescream ==
Livescream is the 2018 predecessor to Livescreamers. Also written and directed by Iannantuono, the film centers upon a livestream gamer named Scott Atkinson, who chooses to play a purportedly haunted video game for his dedicated fanbase. As the game progresses Scott learns that the game is killing his viewers based on his in-game choices and that there is a risk of his own death, if he does not successfully win against the final boss. Scott is ultimately successful, but in the end realizes that the final boss was another player, a young boy who is then killed by the siren running the game. The film premiered at the Crimson Screen Film Festival in 2018 and went on to screen at the Nightmares Film Festival, where Iannantuono won Best Director. The film was released through VOD and on Blu-ray, and received a favorable review from Horror Society.
