= ChadGetsTheAxe =

#ChadGetsTheAxe
- Directed by: Travis Bible
- Written by: Travis Bible; Kemerton Hargrove
- Starring: Spencer Harrison Levin; Michael Bonini; Taneisha Figueroa; Cameron Vitosh
- Release date: 2022
- Language: English

#ChadGetsTheAxe, also stylized as ChadGetsTheAxe and Chad Gets The Axe, is a 2022 horror movie that was directed by Travis Bible, based on a script he co-wrote with Kemerton Hargrove.

== Synopsis ==
A group of social media influencers, Chad, Steve, Jennifer, and Spencer, have chosen to livestream themselves exploring an abandoned home known as the site of a series of gruesome ritualistic murders led by a Satanic cult. Chad and Steve find a body in the attic and Steve places his hat on it, enraging their viewers while also bringing in new ones. Jennifer and Spencer choose to leave, however Jennifer decides to return after learning of the increased viewers. Fearing a potential fallout, Steve decides to retrieve the hat but finds the body missing. He is then knocked out by a robed figure.

Chad's phone goes missing and together with Jennifer, he manages to track it to a nearby swamp. While Chad leaves to retrieve the phone, Jennifer is abducted by a robed figure. Chad returns to find Jennifer gone, but assumes that it's all part of a prank by a rival channel. This is proven false when a robed figure attacks and wounds him with an ax. He then attempts to seek help, but is rejected by his peers (who are implied to despise him), the police (who assume it is one of his outrageous pranks), and his family (who demand that he perform favors for them before helping). The viewers are split between assuming it is another prank and believing that the robed figures are the Satanic cult, which was never caught and is rumored to have continued their killing spree in other states. Two followers come to Chad's aid but are murdered by the cult members.

Chad returns to the house after learning that the cult is holding Jennifer captive. He challenges the cult member to back off, only for Jennifer to reveal to him there is more than one of them in the house. Outnumbered, his rescue attempt is unsuccessful, as the cult members murder Jennifer, Steve, and Spencer, the latter of whom came back after viewing Jennifer's abduction and was knocked unconscious by an unseen figure. Chad is then chased by the cult members, who murder him with an axe. Over the credits, a series of social media videos responding to the livestream are played over the credits. The videos range from people grieving for Chad, reaction videos where people assume it was all fake, to people mocking or celebrating his death.

== Cast ==
- Spencer Harrison Levin as Chad
- Michael Bonini as Steve
- Taneisha Figueroa as Jennifer
- Cameron Vitosh as Spencer
- Jerilyn Armstrong as MGreyMD
- Brandon Doyle as Eric
- Eric Gibson as Pizza Dad
- Shun Hagins as Big Tony
- Kemerton Hargrove as Hot Wire Guy
- Terry J. Nelson as Burrows
- Aleigh Porter as Elise
- Ru Benjamin Revolver as Craig
- Cairo Spencer as Jordan Benson
- Ryan Anthony Williams as Trent

== Production ==
Director Travis Bible has cited the Black Mirror episode Bandersnatch as an inspiration for the film. His initial pitch for the film would allow the audience to switch between the different streams, which would in turn impact the type of comments the streamers received. Bible and Hargrove dropped the interactivity angle but kept the concept of the film switching between the four different streamers.

== Release ==
#ChadGetsTheAxe had its world premiere at FilmQuest on October 29, 2022, followed by a release to streaming and video on demand on September 1, 2023.

== Reception ==
#ChadGetsTheAxe has a rating of 100% on Rotten Tomatoes, based on 8 reviews. The film received praise from Dread Central and Screen Anarchy, the latter of which noted that the movie was more targeted towards younger viewers and writing that "Regardless of your vintage #chadgetstheaxe is effectively creepy at the right time." Ginger Nuts of Horror also wrote a favorable review, stating "Chad gets the Axe is a fun swipe at social media popularity and the toxicity of the internet, with a modern-day satanic cult thrown in for good measure. While it is not overly scary and there is minimal gore, there are a couple of good jump scares, and the story is fun enough to keep you guessing until the end."
