= Dutch Marich =

American film director, screenwriter, and producer

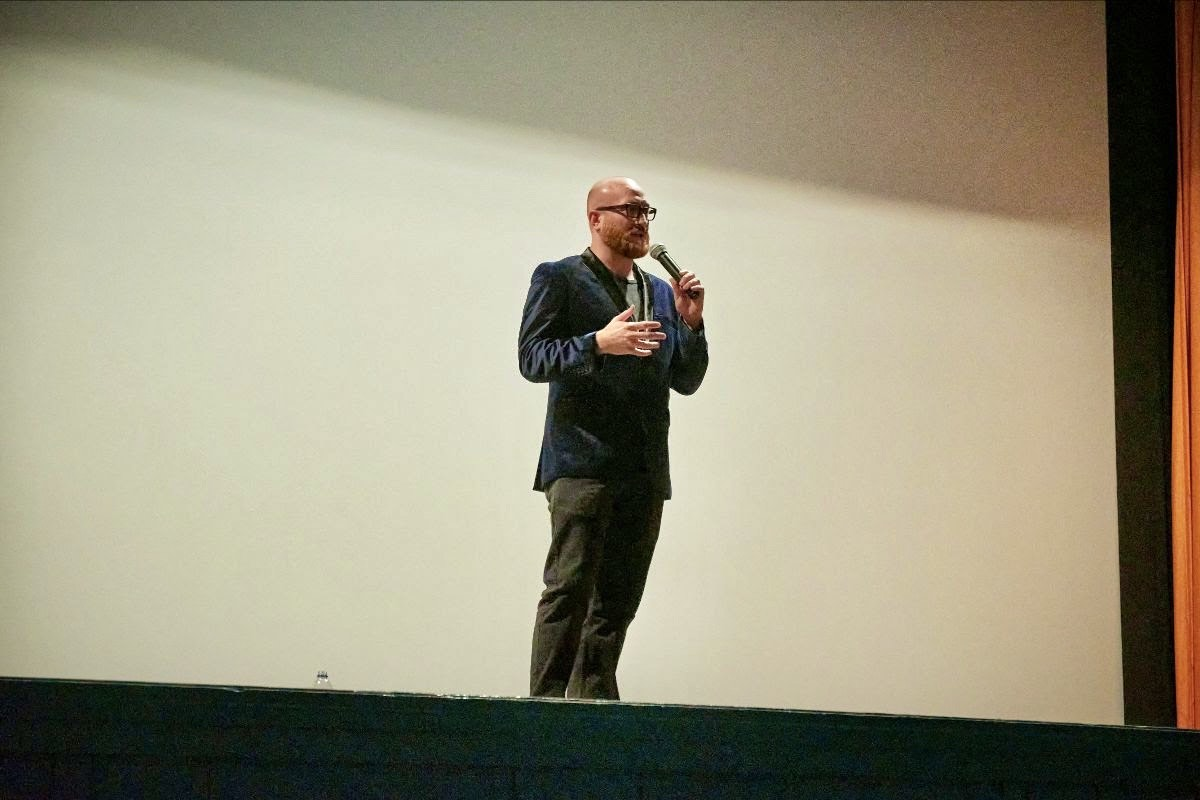
- Occupations: Director; screenwriter; actor; producer
- Years active: 2009–present

Dutch Marich is an American director, screenwriter, and producer. He is best known for his work on the film Horror in the High Desert.

== Life and career ==
Dutch was raised in Ruth, Nevada. His debut feature film, Bleed Out, starred Nichole Cordova. His second feature film, Hunting, premiered on September 30, 2019, on Amazon Prime Video. His recent films are Infernum (2019), Reaptown (2020) and Horror in the High Desert (2021).

== Filmography ==
Year	Film				
Year	Film	Director	Writer	Producer	Notes
2010	Finer Feelings	No	No	Yes	Short film
2011	Bleed Out	Yes	Yes	Yes	
2015	Hunting	Yes	Yes	Yes	
2016	The Dark Hand	Yes	Yes	Yes	
2018	Miserable Sinners	Yes	Yes	Yes	
2019	Infernum	Yes	Yes	Yes	Cinematographer
2020	Reaptown	Yes	Yes	Yes	
2021	Horror in the High Desert	Yes	Yes	Yes	Editor and cinematographer
2023	Horror in the High Desert 2: Minerva	Yes	Yes	Yes	Editor
2024	Horror in the High Desert 3: Firewatch	Yes	Yes	Yes	Editor
2025	Horror in the High Desert 4: Majesty	Yes	Yes	Yes	Editor

As Actor

- 2009 – Kicking Sand in Your Face
- 2010 – Jelly
- 2010 – Finer Feelings
- 2011 – Bleed Out
- 2016 – The Dark Hand
