= List of comedy horror films =

This is a sortable list of comedy horror (or horror comedy) films, this subgenre being a bundling of the two genres in which "horror-comedy places an emphasis on scares, while the comedy-horror film moves that emphasis into the realm of laughs."

== 1920s - 1930s ==
Year	Title	Reference
1920	Haunted Spooks	
1921	The Haunted House	
1922	The Ghost Breaker	
1923	Puritan Passions	
1925	Dr. Pyckle and Mr. Pryde	
1925	The Monster	
1926	The Bat	
1927	The Cat and the Canary	
1927	The Gorilla	
1929	Seven Footprints to Satan	
1930	The Cat Creeps	
1932	The Old Dark House	
1932	Doctor X	
1933	The Invisible Man	
1939	The Cat and the Canary	
1939	The Gorilla	

== 1940s ==
Year	Title	Reference
1940	The Ghost Breakers	
1940	You'll Find Out	
1941	Hold That Ghost	
1941	King of the Zombies	
1941	Spooks Run Wild	
1942	The Boogie Man Will Get You	
1944	Zombies on Broadway	
1944	Arsenic and Old Lace	
1945	Scared Stiff	
1945	Dead of Night	
1945	Spook Busters	
1948	Abbott and Costello Meet Frankenstein	
1949	Abbott and Costello Meet the Killer, Boris Karloff	

== 1950s ==
Year	Title	Reference
1951	Abbott and Costello Meet the Invisible Man	
1951	Mother Riley Meets the Vampire	
1951	Scared Stiff	
1953	Abbott and Costello Meet Dr. Jekyll and Mr. Hyde	
1955	Abbott and Costello Meet the Mummy	
1957	El Castillo de los Monstruos	
1957	Invasion of the Saucer Men	
1959	A Bucket of Blood	

== 1960s ==
Year	Title	Reference
1960	The Little Shop of Horrors	
1961	Creature from the Haunted Sea	
1963	The Evil Eye	
1963	The Old Dark House	
1963	The Raven	
1964	The Comedy of Terrors	
1965	Bhoot Bungla	
1965	Dr. Terror's House of Horrors	
1965	Monsters Crash the Pajama Party	
1965	Lemon Grove Kids Meet the Monsters	
1966	Carry On Screaming!	
1966	The Ghost and Mr. Chicken	
1966	Munster, Go Home!	
1967	The Fearless Vampire Killers	
1967	Hillbillys in a Haunted House	
1968	Spider Baby	

== 1970s ==
Year	Title	Reference
1971	The Abominable Dr. Phibes	
1972	Beware! The Blob	
1972	Children Shouldn't Play with Dead Things	
1972	Dr. Phibes Rises Again	
1972	The Gore Gore Girls	
1972	Please Don't Eat My Mother	
1972	Private Parts	
1972	Tales from the Crypt	
1972	The Thing with Two Heads	
1973	Cannibal Girls	
1973	The House in Nightmare Park	
1973	Theatre of Blood	
1973	The Vault of Horror	
1973	The Werewolf of Washington	
1974	The Cars That Ate Paris	
1974	Phantom of the Paradise	
1974	Young Frankenstein	
1975	The Rocky Horror Picture Show	
1977	House	
1978	Attack of the Killer Tomatoes	
1978	Piranha	
1979	The Cat and the Canary	
1979	Love at First Bite	

== 1980s ==
Year	Title	Reference
1980	Banchharamer Bagan	
1980	Christmas Evil	
1980	Hell of the Living Dead	
1980	Motel Hell	
1980	Witches' Brew	
1981	An American Werewolf in London	
1981	Encounters of the Spooky Kind	
1981	The Munsters' Revenge	
1981	Saturday the 14th	
1981	Shock Treatment	
1981	Student Bodies	
1982	Eating Raoul	
1982	Creepshow	
1982	Full Moon High	
1982	Hysterical	
1982	Jekyll and Hyde... Together Again	
1982	National Lampoon's Class Reunion	
1982	Pandemonium	
1982	Slumber Party massacre	
1983	Bloodbath at the House of Death	
1983	Frightmare	
1983	Microwave Massacre	
1984	Bloodsuckers from Outer Space	
1984	Gremlins	
1984	Ghostbusters	
1984	Surf II	
1984	The Toxic Avenger	
1985	Once Bitten	
1985	Re-Animator	
1985	Return of the Living Dead	
1985	The Stuff	
1985	Transylvania 6-5000	
1986	Blood Hook	
1986	Chopping Mall	
1986	Class of Nuke 'Em High	
1986	Critters	
1986	From Beyond	
1986	Haunted Honeymoon	
1986	House	
1986	Killer Party	
1986	Little Shop of Horrors	
1986	Monster in the Closet	
1986	Maximum Overdrive	
1986	Mr. Vampire	
1986	Mr. Vampire 2	
1986	New Mr. Vampire	
1986	Night of the Creeps	
1986	The Seventh Curse	
1986	Slaughter High	
1986	TerrorVision	
1986	Texas Chainsaw Massacre 2	
1986	Troll	
1987	Bad Taste	
1987	Bates Motel	
1987	Blood Diner	
1987	A Chinese Ghost Story	
1987	Curse of the Queerwolf	
1987	Doom Asylum	
1987	Evil Dead II	
1987	House II: The Second Story	
1987	I Was a Teenage Zombie	
1987	The Lost Boys	
1987	Mr. Vampire 3	
1987	The Monster Squad	
1987	Munchies	
1987	Nightmare Sisters	
1987	Return to Horror High	
1987	Silent Night, Deadly Night 2	
1987	Slumber Party Massacre 2	
1987	Street Trash	
1987	The Witches of Eastwick	
1988	Assault of the Killer Bimbos	
1988	Beetlejuice	
1988	Dead Heat	
1988	Dr. Hackenstein	
1988	Elvira: Mistress of the Dark	
1988	Evil Laugh	
1988	High Spirits	
1988	Hobgoblins	
1988	Hollywood Chainsaw Hookers	
1988	Killer Klowns from Outer Space	
1988	The Lair of the White Worm	
1988	Mr. Vampire 4	
1988	My Best Friend Is a Vampire	
1988	A Nightmare on Elm Street 4: The Dream Master	
1988	Night of the Demons	
1988	Return of the Killer Tomatoes	
1988	Return of the Living Dead Part II	
1988	Shaolin vs. Vampire	
1988	Sorority Babes in the Slimeball Bowl-O-Rama	
1988	Waxwork	
1989	The 'Burbs	
1989	Cannibal Women in the Avocado Jungle of Death	
1989	Cutting Class	
1989	Dr. Caligari	
1989	Ghostbusters II	
1989	Hellgate	
1989	Parents	
1989	The Toxic Avenger Part II	
1989	The Toxic Avenger Part III: The Last Temptation of Toxie	
1989	My Mom's a Werewolf	
1989	Shocker	
1989	Vampire's Kiss	

== 1990s ==
Year	Title	Reference
1990	Arachnophobia	
1990	Bride of Re-Animator	
1990	Frankenhooker	
1990	Gremlins 2: The New Batch	
1990	I Bought a Vampire Motorcycle	
1990	Magic Cop	
1990	Rockula	
1990	Slumber Party Massacre 3	
1990	Tales from the Darkside: The Movie	
1990	Tremors	
1990	Troll 2	
1990	Ghost	
1990	Repossessed	
1991	Chopper Chicks in Zombietown	
1991	Ernest Scared Stupid	
1991	Freddy's Dead: The Final Nightmare	
1991	Highway to Hell	
1991	Nothing But Trouble	
1991	Nudist Colony of the Dead	
1991	Popcorn	
1991	The Addams Family	
1991	The People Under the Stairs	
1991	The Willies	
1991	Delicatessen	
1992	Army of Darkness	
1992	Braindead (also known as Dead Alive in North America)	
1992	Buffy the Vampire Slayer	
1992	Dr. Giggles	
1992	Evil Toons	
1992	Innocent Blood	
1992	Society	
1993	Addams Family Values	
1993	Body Bags	
1993	Body Melt	
1993	Ed and His Dead Mother	
1993	Funny Man	
1993	Leprechaun	
1993	Freaked	
1993	Man's Best Friend	
1993	Manichitrathazhu	
1993	My Boyfriend's Back	
1993	Return of the Living Dead 3	
1993	Stepmonster	
1993	Zombie Bloodbath	
1994	Cemetery Man	
1994	Serial Mom	
1994	Wolf	
1995	Blood and Donuts	
1995	A Bucket of Blood	
1995	Casper	
1995	Tales from the Crypt: Demon Knight	
1995	The Day of the Beast	
1995	Dracula: Dead and Loving It	
1995	Evil Ed	
1995	Ice Cream Man	
1995	Vampire in Brooklyn	
1996	Bordello of Blood	
1996	Cannibal! The Musical	
1996	The Frighteners	
1996	Frostbiter: Wrath of the Wendigo	
1996	Jack Frost	
1996	Scream	
1997	An American Werewolf in Paris	
1997	Killer Condom	
1997	Wishmaster	
1997	Scream 2	
1998	Ajab Gayer Ajab Katha	
1998	Bio Zombie	
1998	Bride of Chucky	
1998	Scooby-Doo on Zombie Island	
1999	Wishmaster 2: Evil Never Dies	
1999	Idle Hands	
1999	Lake Placid	
1999	Terror Firmer	

== 2000s ==
Year	Title	Reference
2000	American Psycho	
2000	Cherry Falls	
2000	Citizen Toxie: The Toxic Avenger IV	
2000	Cut	
2000	Little Otik	
2000	Psycho Beach Party	
2000	Scary Movie	
2000	Scream 3	
2000	Wild Zero	
2001	Elvira's Haunted Hills	
2001	The Happiness of the Katakuris	
2001	Jesus Christ Vampire Hunter	
2001	Scary Movie 2	
2002	Bloody Mallory	
2002	Bubba Ho-Tep	
2002	Cabin Fever	
2002	Eight Legged Freaks	
2002	Halloween: Resurrection	
2002	Scooby-Doo	
2003	Battlefield Baseball	
2003	Beyond Re-Animator	
2003	Buppah Rahtree	
2003	Dead End	
2003	Gory Gory Hallelujah	
2003	Gozu	
2003	The Haunted Mansion	
2003	Hey, Stop Stabbing Me!	
2003	Scary Movie 3	
2004	Choking Hazard	
2004	Club Dread	
2004	Dead & Breakfast	
2004	Hide and Creep	
2004	SARS Wars	
2004	Satan's Little Helper	
2004	Scooby-Doo 2: Monsters Unleashed	
2004	Seed of Chucky	
2004	Shaun of the Dead	
2004	To Catch a Virgin Ghost	
2005	Boy Eats Girl	
2005	Buppah Rahtree Phase 2: Rahtree Returns	
2005	Die You Zombie Bastards!	
2005	Chandramukhi	
2005	D' Anothers	
2005	Evil Aliens	
2005	The Gingerdead Man	
2005	Ispiritista: Itay, May Moomoo!	
2005	Pervert!	
2005	Santa's Slay	
2006	Behind the Mask: The Rise of Leslie Vernon	
2006	Big Bad Wolf	
2006	Black Sheep	
2006	Botched	
2006	Dead and Deader	
2006	Evil Bong	
2006	Feast	
2006	Fido	
2006	Frostbiten	
2006	Monster House	
2006	Poultrygeist: Night of the Chicken Dead	
2006	Scary Movie 4	
2006	Severance	
2006	Slither	
2006	Stupid Teenagers Must Die!	
2007	Bhool Bhulaiyaa	
2007	Bratz Kidz: Sleep-Over Adventure	
2007	Ghost Station	
2007	Long Pigs	
2007	The Mad	
2007	Murder Party	
2007	My Name Is Bruce	
2007	Netherbeast Incorporated	
2007	Teeth	
2007	Wrong Turn 2: Dead End	
2007	ThanksKilling	
2007	Trick 'r Treat	
2008	Bad Biology	
2008	Baghead	
2008	Bhoothnath	
2008	The Cottage	
2008	Dance of the Dead	
2008	Feast 2: Sloppy Seconds	
2008	Gutterballs	
2008	Hoodoo for Voodoo	
2008	I Sell the Dead	
2008	Jack Brooks: Monster Slayer	
2008	Mostly Ghostly: Who Let the Ghosts Out?	
2008	Otis	
2008	Tokyo Gore Police	
2008	Zombie Strippers	
2009	Chaw	
2009	Dead Hooker in a Trunk	
2009	Dead Snow	
2009	Doghouse	
2009	Drag Me to Hell	
2009	Feast III: The Happy Finish	
2009	Infestation	
2009	Jennifer's Body	
2009	The Last Lovecraft: Relic of Cthulhu	
2009	Lesbian Vampire Killers	
2009	My Super Psycho Sweet 16	
2009	The Revenant	
2009	Stan Helsing	
2009	Strigoi	
2009	Tormented	
2009	Where Got Ghost?	
2009	Zombieland	

== 2010s ==
Year	Title	Reference
2010	Big Tits Zombie	
2010	Blood Junkie	
2010	Hellbenders	
2010	Juan of the Dead	
2010	My Super Psycho Sweet 16: Part 2	
2010	Piranha 3D	
2010	President's Day	
2010	Rare Exports: A Christmas Tale	
2010	Rubber	
2010	Trollhunter	
2010	Tucker & Dale vs. Evil	
2011	Detention	
2011	Dylan Dog: Dead of Night	
2011	Fright Night	
2011	Kanchana	
2011	Scream 4	
2011	The Selling	
2011	Zombie Ass: Toilet of the Dead	
2012	Bhooter Bhabishyat	
2012	Bloody Bloody Bible Camp	
2012	The Cabin in the Woods	
2012	Dark Shadows	
2012	Hotel Transylvania	
2012	Dead Before Dawn	
2012	A Fantastic Fear of Everything	
2012	Frankenweenie	
2012	Game of Werewolves	
2012	Grabbers	
2012	Jekhane Bhooter Bhoy	
2012	John Dies at the End	
2012	A Little Bit Zombie	
2012	My Super Psycho Sweet 16: Part 3	
2012	ParaNorman	
2012	Piranha 3DD	
2012	Stitches	
2012	ThanksKilling 3	
2012	Vamps	
2012	You Can't Kill Stephen King	
2013	100 Bloody Acres	
2013	Adbhoot	
2013	All Cheerleaders Die	
2013	Bad Milo!	
2013	Chastity Bites	
2013	Chhayamoy	
2013	Gingerclown	
2013	Go Goa Gone	
2013	Goynar Baksho	
2013	Hansel & Gretel: Witch Hunters	
2013	A Haunted House	
2013	Hell Baby	
2013	Scary Movie 5	
2013	This Is the End	
2013	Warm Bodies	
2013	Witching and Bitching	
2013	Zapatlela 2	
2013	Cheap Thrills	
2014	13 Sins	
2014	Army of Frankensteins	
2014	Bloody Knuckles	
2014	Call Girl of Cthulhu	
2014	Cooties	
2014	Dead Snow: Red vs. Dead	
2014	Gulyabani	
2014	A Haunted House 2	
2014	Hooked Up	
2014	Housebound	
2014	Life After Beth	
2014	Love in the Time of Monsters	
2014	Teen Lust	
2014	Tusk	
2014	Summer of Blood	
2014	Vampire Academy	
2014	The Voices	
2014	The Walking Deceased	
2014	The Editor	
2014	Wild Tales	
2014	What We Do in the Shadows	
2014	WolfCop	
2014	Zombeavers	
2015	Bullets, Fangs and Dinner at 8	
2015	Deathgasm	
2015	Death-Scort Service	
2015	Dude Bro Party Massacre III	
2015	Freaks of Nature	
2015	Ghoul	
2015	Hotel Transylvania 2	
2015	Goosebumps	
2015	Krampus	
2015	Lavalantula	
2015	Lumberjack Man	
2015	Nina Forever	
2015	Scouts Guide to the Zombie Apocalypse	
2015	Stung	
2015	The Final Girls	
2015	Tales of Halloween	
2015	The Visit	
2015	The Walking Deceased	
2015	Z Island	
2016	Bad Ben	
2016	Better Watch Out	
2016	Don't Kill It	
2016	Fear, Inc.	
2016	Found Footage 3D	
2016	Ghostbusters	
2016	Meet the Blacks	
2016	The Phantom Hour	
2016	The Greasy Strangler	
2016	Pi Day Die Day	
2016	Pretham	
2016	Yoga Hosers	
2017	#FromJennifer	
2017	Anna and the Apocalypse	
2017	Another WolfCop	
2017	One Cut of the Dead	
2017	The Babysitter	
2017	Eat Locals	
2017	Happy Death Day	
2017	It	
2017	Little Evil	
2017	Mayhem	
2017	Mom and Dad	
2017	Tragedy Girls	
2017	Le Manoir	
2018	Assassination Nation	
2018	Blood Fest	
2018	The Cleanse	
2018	Hotel Transylvania 3: Summer Vacation	
2018	Goosebumps 2: Haunted Halloween	
2018	Nekrotronic	
2018	Slaughterhouse Rulez	
2018	Slice	
2018	Stree	
2018	The Night Sitter	
2018	The VelociPastor	
2018	The House with a Clock in Its Walls	
2018	You Might Be the Killer	
2019	The Addams Family	
2019	The Banana Splits Movie	
2019	Bhobishyoter Bhoot	
2019	Come to Daddy	
2019	It Chapter Two	
2019	Corporate Animals	
2019	Critters Attack!	
2019	The Dead Don't Die	
2019	The Odd Family: Zombie on Sale	
2019	Tone-Deaf	
2019	Extra Ordinary	
2019	Get Duked!	
2019	Greener Grass	
2019	Happy Death Day 2U	
2019	Little Monsters	
2019	Ready or Not	
2019	Satanic Panic	
2019	Velvet Buzzsaw	
2019	Villains	
2019	Yummy	
2019	Zombieland: Double Tap	
2019	Ring Ring	

== 2020s ==
Year	Title	Reference
2020	Beast Mode	
2020	Hubie Halloween	
2020	Love and Monsters	
2020	Scare Package	
2020	Stakeout	
2020	The Babysitter: Killer Queen	
2020	Freaky	
2020	The Wolf of Snow Hollow	
2020	Scare Me	
2020	Vampires vs. the Bronx	
2020	Uncle Peckerhead	
2020	Friend of the World	
2021	Bhoot Bangla	
2021	Zombie Reddy	
2021	Ghostbusters: Afterlife	
2021	Hawk and Rev: Vampire Slayers	
2021	Werewolves Within	
2021	Kicking Blood	
2021	Aquarium of the Dead	
2021	Willy's Wonderland	
2021	Continuance	
2022	Scream	
2022	Hotel Transylvania: Transformania	
2022	Zombivli	
2022	Bhool Bhulaiyaa 2	
2022	Deadstream	
2022	Everybody Dies by the End	
2022	Ballabhpurer Roopkotha	
2022	Bhediya	
2022	Gatlopp: Hell of a Game	
2022	Glorious	
2022	Wendell & Wild	
2023	Romancham	
2023	Cocaine Bear	
2023	The Blackening	
2023	Beau Is Afraid	
2023	Scream VI	
2023	Hemet, or the Landlady Don't Drink Tea	
2023	Et Tu	
2024	Lisa Frankenstein	
2024	Abigail	
2024	Ghostbusters: Frozen Empire	
2024	Munjya	
2024	Beetlejuice Beetlejuice	
2024	Stree 2	
2024	A Very Flattened Christmas	
2024	Y2K	
2024	Sincerely Saul	
2025	The Monkey	
2025	Screamboat	
2025	Penny Lane Is Dead	
2025	Anaconda	
2026	Attack of the Killer Tomatoes: Organic Intelligence	
2026	Scream 7	
2026	Ready or Not 2: Here I Come	
2026	They Will Kill You	
2026	Black Sheeps	
2026	Christmas at the Kringles	

== See also ==
- Lists of films
- Scooby-Doo in film
