= List of horror films of 2010 =

This is a list of horror films released in 2010.

Horror films released in 2010
Title	Director	Cast	Country	Notes
9 Temples	Saranyoo Jiralak	Siraphan Wattanajinda, James Alexander Mackie, Penpak Sirikul	Thailand	
30 Days of Night: Dark Days	Ben Ketai	Kiele Sanchez, Mia Kirshner, Rhys Coiro	United States	
2001 Maniacs: Field of Screams	Tim Sullivan Anurag	Bill Moseley, Lin Shaye, Nivek Ogre, Christa Campbell, Trevor Wright	United States	
Aal	Bahram Bahramian	Anahita Nemati, Homayoun Ershadi, Mostafa Zamani, Hengameh Hamidzadeh	Iran; Armenia	
Alice in Murderland	Dennis Devine	Malerie Grady, Marlene Mc'Cohen, Kelly KulA	United States	
Atrocious	Fernando Barreda Luna	Cristian Valencia, Clara Moraleda, Chus Pereiro	Mexico; Spain	
Basement	Asham Kamboj	Danny Dyer, Jimi Mistry, Emily Beecham	United Kingdom	
Bear	John Rebel	Katie Lowes	United Kingdom	
Bereavement	Stevan Mena	Michael Biehn, Alexandra Daddario, John Savage, Nolan Gerard Funk	United States	
Big Tits Zombie	Takao Nakano	Sola Aoi, Risa Kasumi, Mari Samurai	Japan	Comedy horror
Birthright	Hashimoto Naoki	Oho Sayoko, Yagyu Miyu, Takizawa Ryoko	Japan	
Black Swan	Darren Aronofsky	Natalie Portman, Vincent Cassel, Mila Kunis	United States	
Blood Junkie	Drew Rosas	Nick Sommer, Mike Johnson, Sarah Luther	United States	
Buried	Rodrigo Cortés	Ryan Reynolds, Ivana Miño	Spain	Psychological horror
Captifs	Yann Gozlan	Zoé Félix, Eric Savin, Arie Elmaleh	France	
Chain Letter	Deon Taylor	Nikki Reed, Noah Segan, Keith David	United States	
The Child's Eye 3D	Oxide Pang, Danny Pang	Rainie Yang, Elanne Kwong, Lam Ka-tung	Hong Kong	
Cinco	Frasco Mortiz, Enrico C. Santos, Ato Bautista, Nick Olanka, Cathy Garcia-Sampana	Sam Concepcion, AJ Perez, Robi Domingo, Jodi Sta. Maria, Maja Salvador, Rayver Cruz, Mariel Rodriguez, Pokwang, Zanjoe Marudo	Philippines	
Cold Prey 3	Mikkel Brænne Sandemose		Norway	
The Crazies	Breck Eisner	Timothy Olyphant, Radha Mitchell, Danielle Panabaker	United States	
Dahmer Vs. Gacy	Ford Austin	Randal Malone, Ford Austin, Art La Fleur	United States	
Dante's Inferno: An Animated Epic	Mike Disa, Shukō Murase, Yosuomi Umetsu	Steve Blum, Graham McTavish, Peter Jessop	Japan	Animated film
Dead Exit	Wes Young & Ryan Goff	Bob Heron, Randy Foos	United States	
Death Bell 2: Bloody Camp	Yoo Sun-dong	Kim Soo-ro, Hwang Jeong-eum, Yun Shi-yun	South Korea	
Dream Home	Pang Ho-cheung	Josie Ho, Eason Chan, Derek Tsang	Hong Kong	
Evil Rises	Nayato Fio Nuala	Zaki Zimah, Leylarey Lesesne, Monique Henry	Indonesia	
Exorcismus	Manuel Carballo	Sophie Vavasseur, Stephen Billington, Doug Bradley	Spain	
The Frankenstein Syndrome	Sean Tretta	Louis Mandylor, Tiffany Shepis, David C. Hayes	United States	
Frozen	Adam Green	Emma Bell, Shawn Ashmore, Kevin Zegers	United States	
Goblin	Jeffery Scott Lando	Gil Bellows, Tracy Spiridakos, Camille Sullivan	Canada	
Hard Ride to Hell	Penelope Buitenhuis	Miguel Ferrer, Laura Mennell, Katharine Isabelle	United States	
Hatchet II	Adam Green	Kane Hodder, Danielle Harris, Tom Holland	United States	
The Haunted House Project	Lee Cheol-ha	Shin Gyeong-seon, Yun Yi-na, Jeon In-geol	South Korea	
Helldriver	Yoshihiro Nishimura	Eihi Shiina, Yumiko Hara, Yūrei Yanagi	Japan	
Higanjima: Escape from Vampire Island	Kim Tae-kyun	Hideo Ishiguro, Dai Watanabe, Miori Takimoto	Japan	
Hisss	Jennifer Chambers Lynch	Mallika Sherawat, Jeff Doucette, Irrfan Khan	India; United States	
Horny House of Horror	Jun Tsugita	Yuya Ishikawa, Saori Hara, Asami	Japan	
The Hut	Javad Afshar	Babak Hamidian, Bahareh Afshari, Jamshid Hashempour, Kambiz Dirbaz, Ahmad Mehranfar	Iran	
I Am Virgin	Sean Skelding	Ron Jeremy, Melinda Ausserer, Maren McGuire	United States	
I Spit on Your Grave	Steven R. Monroe	Jeff Branson, Sarah Butler, Rodney Eastman	United States	
Insidious	James Wan	Patrick Wilson, Rose Byrne, Lin Shaye	United States	
The Intruder	Thanadol Nualsuth, Thammanoon Sakulboonthano	Akara Amarttayakul, Kwankao Savetawimon, Apinya Sakuljaroensuk	Thailand	
L.A. Zombie	Bruce LaBruce		United States	
Julia's Eyes	Guillem Morales	Belén Rueda, Lluís Homar, Pablo Derqui	Spain	
The Last Exorcism	Daniel Stamm	Patrick Fabian, Ashley Bell, Iris Bahr	United States	
Let Me In	Matt Reeves	Kody Smit-McPhee, Sasha Barrese, Chloë Grace Moretz	United Kingdom; United States	
Madness	Sonny Laguna, David Liljeblad, Tommy Wiklund	Yohanna Idha, Max Wallmo, Jonas Wiik	Sweden	
Midnight Beating	Zhang Jiabei	Simon Yam, Francis Ng, Yang Yuyu	China	
Mongolian Death Worm	Neil Elman, Steven R. Monroe	Sean Patrick Flanery, George Cheung, Victoria Pratt	United States	
Mutant Girls Squad	Noboru Iguchi, Yoshihiro Nishimura, Tak Sakaguchi	Yumi Sugimoto, Yuko Takayama, Suzuka Morita	Japan	
My Soul to Take	Wes Craven	Max Thieriot, John Magaro, Zena Grey	United States	
A Nightmare on Elm Street	Samuel Bayer	Rooney Mara, Jackie Earle Haley, Kyle Gallner	United States	
The Pack	Franck Richard	Émilie Dequenne, Yolande Moreau, Benjamin Biolay	France; Belgium	
Paranormal Activity 2	Tod Williams	Katie Featherston, Micah Sloat, Brian Boland	United States	
Paranormal Activity: Tokyo Night	Nagae Toshikazu	Nakamura Aoi, Aoyama Noriko, Yoshitani Ayako	Japan	
Piranha 3-D	Alexandre Aja	Elisabeth Shue, Adam Scott, Jerry O'Connell	United States	
The Presence	Tom Provost	Tony Curran, DeObia Oparei	United States	
President's Day	Chris LaMartina	Bennie Mack McCoy IV, Lizzy Denning, Shawn C. Phillips	United States	Comedy horror
Primal	Josh Reed	Zoe Tuckwell-Smith, Krew Boylan, Linsday Farris	Australia; United Kingdom	
Psychosis	Reg Traviss	Charisma Carpenter, Ty Glaser, Axelle Carolyn	United Kingdom	
Puppet Master: Axis of Evil	David DeCoteau	Levi Fiehler, Tom Sandoval, Jerry Hoffman	United States	
Rabies	Aharon Keshales, Navot Papushado	Lior Ashkenazi, Ania Bukstein, Danny Geva, Yael Grobglas	Israel	
Red: Werewolf Hunter	Sheldon Wilson	Felicia Day, Kavan Smith, Steven McHattie	Canada	Werewolf film
The Reef	Andrew Traucki	Damian Walshe-Howling, Zoe Naylor, Adrienne Pickering	Australia	Natural horror
Resident Evil: Afterlife	Paul W. S. Anderson	Milla Jovovich, Ali Larter, Kim Coates	Canada; Germany	
The Rig	Peter Atencio	William Forsythe, Art LaFleur, Sarah Laine	United States	
Road Train	Dean Francis	Sophie Lowe, Bob Morley, Georgina Haig	Australia	
Rubber	Quentin Dupieux	Stephen Spinella, Roxane Mesquida, Jack Plotnick	France	
The Sanctuary	Mohammad Reza Khatibi	Chakameh Chamanmah, Enayatollah Shafiee, Hamid Farokhnezhad, Shirin Bina	Iran	
Satan Hates You	James Felix McKenney	Reggie Bannister, Larry Fessenden, Michael Berryman	United States	
Saw 3D	Kevin Greutert	Tobin Bell, Cary Elwes, Costas Mandylor	United States	
A Serbian Film	Srđan Spasojević	Srđan Todorović, Sergej Trifunović, Carlie Huthart	Serbia	
Shelter	Måns Mårlind, Bjorn Stein	Julianne Moore, Jonathan Rhys Meyers	United States	
The Silent House	Gustavo Hernandez	Gustavo Alonso, Abel Tripaldi, Florencia Colucci	Uruguay	
Sint	Dick Maas	Huub Stapel, Egbert-Jan Weeber, Egbert-Jan Weeber	Netherlands	
Stake Land	Jim Mickle	Connor Paolo, Nick Damici, Kelly McGillis	United States	
Still	Chartchai Ketnust, Manussa Vorasingha, Tanwarin Sukkhapisit, Poj Arnon	Mai Charoenpura, Kachapa Tungcharoen, Weeradit Srimalai	Thailand	
The Tenant	Ric La Monte	Michael Berryman, J. Larose, Carrie Drazek	United States	
Thankskilling	Jordan Downey		United States	
Trollhunter	André Øvredal	Otto Jespersen, Hans Morten Hanesn, Tomas Alf Larsen	Norway	
Tucker & Dale vs. Evil	Eli Craig	Tyler Labine, Alan Tudyk, Katrina Bowden	United States; Canada	
Ubaldo Terzani Horror Show	Gabriele Albanesi	Paolo Sassanelli, Giuseppe Soleri	Italy	
The Ward	John Carpenter	Amber Heard, Danielle Panabaker, Mamie Gummer	United States	
We Are What We Are	Jorge Michel Grau	Francisco Barreiro, Alan Chávez, Paulina Gaitán	Mexico	
The Wolfman	Joe Johnston	Benicio del Toro, Anthony Hopkins, Emily Blunt	United States	
Womb Ghosts	Dennis Law	Chrissie Chau, Lam Suet, Koni Lui	Hong Kong	
