= List of analog horror media =

Analog horror is a subgenre of horror fiction based around the aesthetic incorporation of elements related to analog electronics, such as analog television and VHS video recorders. It is typically characterized by low-fidelity graphics, cryptic messages, little to no traditional jump scares, and visual styles reminiscent of late 20th-century television and analog recordings.

This is a sortable list of analog horror media.

== List of notable analog horror media ==
Title	Year	Creator	Description	Notes	References
Amanda the Adventurer	2023	MANGLEDmaw Games	Dora the Explorer-inspired puzzle game series involving locating mysterious VHS tapes full of disturbing content from an animated children's series starring an African American girl and a sheep named Wooly.		
Angel Hare	2022	East Patch Productions: (Hannah Mangan and; Rachel Mangan)	Inspired by Christian animated cartoons, Angel Hare is presented as an animated series starring an angelic hare named Gabby and her badger companion, Francis. Series protagonist Jonah, who watched the cartoon as a child, begins uploading footage of the cartoon to YouTube after realizing his personal VHS copy of the series differs from one found at the thrift store. As he rewatches the series, Jonah realizes that his copy of the cartoon had directly addressed young Jonah, giving him advice on how to deal with abuse by a parental figure (supposedly his father).		
Archive 81	2016	Dan Powell; Marc Sollinger	Horror podcast centered on an archivist named Dan, who is told by his new boss to constantly record his life. Dan's friend Marc listens to the recordings of Dan doing his job after Dan goes missing in hopes of learning what happened to him.	It was adapted into a Netflix Original television series, which ran for one season in 2022.	
Backrooms	2022	Kane Parsons (as Kane Pixels)	YouTube series which began with the horror short The Backrooms (Found Footage). Based on the creepypasta of the same name, the short is presented as a VHS tape recorded by a filmmaker who accidentally enters the Backrooms in the 1990s and is pursued by a monster. This was later expanded into a series of twenty-four shorts, following the employees of a company investigating the Backrooms.	In 2023, A24 announced a film adaptation of the Backrooms based on Parsons' videos. It was released on May 29, 2026.	
Basswood County	2022	Dark Mind	YouTube series in which the main creatures are called Humanoids that go through 4 stages, Stage 1 is their True Form and Stage 4 is a Human Form. They come from a place called The Chamber which is deep in the forest.		
Ben Drowned	2010	Alex Hall (as Jadusable)	One of the earliest examples of video game-related analog horror involving video footage of a cursed copy of Legend of Zelda: Majora's Mask.		
Blue_Channel	2021	Gooseworx	YouTube series about a fictional TV channel that aired a commercial for a new drug called "Thalasin" that allows the user to artificially feel emotions.	Created by Gooseworx (The Amazing Digital Circus)	
The Boiled One Phenomenon	2024	Doctor Nowhere	A YouTube video which involves an entity named The Boiled One hijacking a broadcast channel made by a mysterious organization called the Ephrata Branch, discussing a disturbing interruption that has disastrous consequences. With themes of religion and the apocalypse. Individuals watching the hijacked broadcast became victims of The Boiled one, being completely paralyzed and forced to witness, and hear, The Boiled One’s appearance and torture, in a way that resembles the locked-in syndrome.		
Boisvert	2020	Xreamy	An abstract surrealist animated YouTube series following several characters, including Ouriel, Room and Dogtooth, through a world of unsettling imagery, cryptic messages and psychological themes. The series explores isolation, emotional distress, personal conflict and attempts at change through experimental animation, distorted audiovisual elements and symbolic storytelling.	Its narrative is communicated through hidden messages, QR codes, Morse code, hexadecimal, French, Hebrew and American Sign Language	
Broadcast Signal Intrusion	2021	Jacob Gentry	A local television video archivist unearthing sinister broadcast signal intrusions from the late 1980s/early 1990s.		
Buddy	2026	Casper Kelly	One kid refuses to participate in singing, dancing and playing along with the other kids and their brightly orange unicorn friend (the latter holding his friends hostage) on a late 1990s Barney and Friends-inspired childrens' TV series It's Buddy.	Featuring the voices of Keegan-Michael Key, Eric Bauza, Patton Oswalt and Michael Shannon and directed by Casper Kelly (Too Many Cooks)	
CH/SS	2016	Turkey Lenin III	Cold War-inspired series of 1980s government-sponsored instructional videos for a mental health organization, with hints at espionage and supernatural forces through obscure Russian dialogue.		
Crypt TV	2015	Jack Davis	Mini-horror movies involving monsters such as The Birch and The Look-See alongside The Sunny Family Cult.		
Dog Nightmares	2022	Piggy Soda	A young woman is looking for her lost dog only to rediscover a dog-man hybrid she knew from her childhood years. The story is told through her old drawings, photographs, video footage and excerpts from Sesame Street featuring skits created by artist William Wegman featuring his pet weimaraners.		
Dreams of an Insomniac	2022	Pastra	YouTube analog horror series following Tommy Merrick, who discovers a mysterious box of VHS tapes in the attic of his old family home. The recordings reveal strange events in Eastridge County, where supernatural creatures known as Veldiguns are linked to a series of disappearances. Later episodes expand the story to the Lankmann Foundation and its investigations into the creatures.	In October 2025, Pastra published a video discussing the future of the series.	
Eventide Media Center	2020	Aidan Chick	Horror anthology series framed as the "local collection" of a public library in the fictional town of Eventide Valley, Massachusetts. Each episode focuses on a different event or monster that inhabits Eventide Valley or other fictional towns in the state.		
Final Transmissions	2025	Steven Hugh; Erica Nelson; Trevor Henderson	A '90s small town Illinois TV host airs disturbingly strange and terrifying signals claiming to be from unknown sources.		
FNAF VHS Tapes	2019	Various, including Squimpus McGrimpus, Battington, and Valox	YouTube videos based on Five Nights at Freddy’s, featuring aesthetics and styles of 1980s and/or 1990s analog media used for the creators' take on the lore and games of the franchise. These psychological horror videos, featuring low-quality and horrific graphics, hidden cryptic messages, and distorted audio, depict topics such as tapes recorded by night guards trying to survive their night shifts and video training manuals that are tampered with, usually by the spirits of murdered children (e.g. Charlotte Emily as the Puppet).	The most popular FNAF VHS series is YouTuber Squimpus McGrimpus' Five Nights at Freddy’s VHS, which was the first to depict Five Nights at Freddy’s in analog horror and features popular installments such as Facial Recognition Testing, Fazbear Entertainment Video Manual, and Sound Response Test that have accumulated millions of views and pioneered FNAF VHS videos, with the last installment titled Finale releasing on July 11th, 2020. They revolve around Michael Afton uncovering the past doings of his father William Afton.	
Frogman	2024	Anthony Cousins & Karl Karsko	Dallas Kyle, who at 12 years old encountered and captured video footage of a mythical creature, returns to where the creature lives to prove that his footage is legitimate.		
Gemini Home Entertainment	2019	Remy Abode	Horror anthology centered on the eponymous Gemini Home Entertainment, a fictional distributor of VHS tapes that detail numerous anomalous incidents taking place around the world, including the appearances of various dangerous alien creatures in the United States and an ongoing assault on the Solar System by "The Iris", a sentient rogue planet which sent the entities to Earth as part of its efforts to subjugate the planet and humanity.		
The Glendale Archives	2025	The Glendale Archives	An archivist digitizes and upload a series of VHS tapes. The tapes show a man lost in a place with no humans at all, with the exception of humanoid "nesters". Throughout the tapes, he talks about problems with his mind and tries to survive in the place.		
Gilbert Garfield	2022-2023	Faraone Productions	A surreal comedy horror satire of lost media analog horror webseries focusing on Gilbert Garfield, a fake TV show where the character of Garfield is played by Gilbert Gottfried. This grows into a deep conspiracy surrounding the company who created the show, which is secretly a fascist cult that clones celebrities in order to create a new world order.		
Harvest Brood	2025	Joe Meredith	An unusually brutal series of murders tied to the dark legend of "the four mutant beings" in a small Alabama town on a Halloween night in 2006.		
Hi I'm Mary Mary	2016	K	Webseries about a woman trapped inside her parents' home without any exit, with only a camera and replenishing supply of food, and while being stalked by shadowy figures including a masked woman.		
The Kid and the Camera	2022	Braiden Ortiz	A stop-motion short about a six-year old camera-loving boy named Cailen who is visited by a creature known as The Cipsneed.		
Kraina Grzybów TV	2013	Wiktor Stribog	A Polish YouTube series about a mysterious pirate broadcast show hosted by a girl named Agatka and her squirrel friend, Małgosia. Kraina Grzybów is made in the aesthetic of old Polish TV shows from the communist era.		
Late Night with the Devil	2024	Colin and Cameron Cairnes	A Halloween-themed episode of a 1970s late night talk show, in which the host, in a desperate attempt to boost ratings, brings an allegedly possessed girl onto the show.	Winner of the Best Independent Film Award at the 52nd Saturn Awards	
Local 58	2015	Kris Straub	YouTube series presented as authentic videotaped footage of a television station that has been continuously hijacked over several decades. While there is no main plot in this series, episodes include messages related to looking up at the Moon or the night sky, as well as the in-universe Thought Research Initiative (TRI) Local 58's first video "Weather Service" was published in 2015 as a stand-alone short and then added to the dedicated YouTube channel when it was established in 2017.	Frequently credited with creating and/or popularizing analog horror.	
The Mandela Catalogue	2021	Alex Kister	YouTube series set in the fictional Mandela County, Wisconsin, which is threatened by the presence of "alternates", doppelgängers who coerce their victims to kill themselves and can manipulate audiovisual media. Other plot aspects include Lucifer disguising himself as the biblical archangel Gabriel, shown through altered footage of episodes from the animated series The Beginners Bible. The series became popular online through analysis and reaction videos.		
The Man in the Suit	2023	Unknowingly	YouTube series unofficially based on the kaiju multimedia franchise Godzilla about a fictional incident that occurred while filming the 1954 Japanese film Godzilla. The man who plays Godzilla via suitmation becomes obsessed with the Godzilla rubber suit, refusing to take it off before he ends up fusing his flesh with it from a radioactive pill and transforms into a vicious, vengeful monster simply referred to as "Goji". Over the course of the next few films, he causes the same thing to happen when he bites the actors for Anguirus, Mothra, and King Ghidorah and makes them fuse with their suits to become monsters themselves, along with killing multiple crew members and the actor for King Kong during the filming of King Kong vs. Godzilla. Despite all of this, Toho makes no attempt to acknowledge the controversies due to the films' commercial success. The cameraman, the series' protagonist, works closely with a secret spy to stop the monster for good.	On February 10, 2025, Unknowingly announced that the series would be officially cancelled due to extreme harassment he experienced from Godzilla fans, having been wrongly accused of disrespecting suit actors such as veteran Godzilla suit actor Haruo Nakajima and the victims of the Hiroshima and Nagasaki atomic bombings. In April 2026, he announced that he would commit suicide, though he survived his attempt and announced such after an admission to a mental health unit. Additionally, Unknowingly was working on other analog horror projects.	
The McKinney Family Home Videos	2024	Molly Cotrufo; Nick Cotrufo	A 68-minute feature in which a father's collection of home videos of important family moments document a dark force lurking within.		
The SMILE Tapes	2021	Patorikku	Presented itself as found footage from the 1990s that talked about the drug infecting people tending to have forced smiles while going on a killing spree.		
Midwest Angelica	2022	Team AQ: (Aidan Chick and; Quarks and Rec)	A cosmic horror YouTube series depicting the work of a NASA organization known as HOME (Division of Heavenly Operations and Material Examination) chronicling their discovery of an alien corpse codenamed "AZ-001" that crashes into Midwest America (mainly Nebraska) in January 1999. AZ-001 begins infecting the surrounding fauna and proves itself to be a threat to the United States. The series takes heavy inspiration from the anime Neon Genesis Evangelion and biblical stories.		
Minerva Alliance	2022	Quarks and Rec	A series of tapes depicting anomalous phenomena collected by the titular non-profit.		
The Monument Mythos	2020	Eve Casanas	A YouTube web series set in different alternate history versions of the United States. The premises include James Dean serving as president having won the 1968 United States presidential election instead of Richard Nixon, an alternate origin of the Statue of Freedom, and Martin Luther King Jr. avoiding his assassination. The episodes are in the found footage and mockumentary format and revolve around American national monuments being depicted in relation to unusual incidents, involving fictional conspiracy theory narratives, such as disappearances of immigrants near the Statue of Liberty, time travel/teleportation, a strange astronomical phenomena above the Pyramids of Giza, and a mysterious infection affecting individuals near Mount Rushmore.		
Mr. Crocket	2024	Brandon Epsy & Carl Reid	A VHS copy (and the dark bloody secret inside) of a strange Mr. Rogers-inspired children's show called Mr. Crocket's World.		
Mystery Flesh Pit National Park	2019	Trevor Roberts	A horror project set in an alternate timeline where in Gumption, Texas where a massive opening in the Earth of flesh and blood was found. The open was that of a superorganism which would eventually be explored to find that the inside of the superorganism stretched for miles and was so massive it had its own ecosystem. Where humans harvested the unique minerals in this superorganism to make advances it technology where it would eventually be made into a National Park, where you could venture into the body of this being.		
Nufox Web Browser	2025	Sepiatone	An alternate reality game presented through simulated computer interfaces, public service announcements and archival-style video recordings. The series follows a fictional web browser and its rebranding from Geistnet to Nufox in 2000. Its narrative explores the browser's connections to the occult and supernatural phenomena through features such as FoxNet and the Nufox Informational Library (NIL). Recurring elements include Butterfly Rot, a phenomenon described in a fictional security announcement, and the Maskholder ritual broadcasts, which depict dangerous supernatural rituals conducted through online broadcasts.	The series incorporates unlisted videos and supplementary material that expands its fictional history, including events surrounding the 2000 rebrand and the browser's earlier development.	
No Through Road	2009	Steven Chamberlain	YouTube series set within the real-world private "no through road" at the entrance of Broomhall Farm, it follows four teenagers driving home at night as they find themselves trapped in a space and time loop, eternally passing the same two road signs marking an intersection separating the villages of Benington and Watton between miles of liminal space countryside, while threatened by a figure who can manipulate the loop back to an archway at the road's entrance. Other plot aspects include all footage of the events being stolen from MI6 and uploaded online to YouTube.		
The Painter	2022	UrbanSPOOK	A YouTube series detailing a collection of tapes that document two serial killers who butcher their victims in increasingly brutal ways; they then proceed to make paintings of said victims which depict how they died.	The series is inspired by the splatterpunk genre of horror, and is frequently criticized for not only its gore factor, but also for its poor handling of sensitive subject matters.	
Pendog Creative Library	2025	Withkindereyes and Sushi Cats	Unfiction about Penny M, an archivist who created an online library preserving histories of obscure cartoon characters (including one known as Miss Hecate) from becoming lost media alongside a party hosted by one of the website's staff that resulted in a massacre caused by a VHS tape of a rare cartoon that traumatized an entire town.		
Petscop	2017	Tony Domenico	A "Let's Play" of a Pokémon-esque game where inputting a cheat code reveals a dark side to said game, involving a murder that greatly affected the game's creator.		
R A D A R	2023	LyraHorrorz	A short film that follows Nathan, a man trapped in his room who begins recording an Entity that repeatedly appears through his television. The Entity communicates with Nathan and subjects him to increasingly disturbing encounters, including a hallway filled with eyes, an ominous message reading "SMILE, YOU'RE ON CAMERA", and a series of increasingly surreal events. After Nathan briefly leaves the room to spend time with his friends, he returns to find that the Entity is still present. The Entity eventually takes a calmer approach and encourages Nathan to open a door and move on from his life. The film uses analog horror, found footage, VHS, and surreal imagery.		
Skinamarink	2022	Kyle Edward Ball	Supernatural horror film which uses experimental techniques to tell the story of two young children, Kevin and Kaylee, as the pair witness the doors and windows of their house disappear. Their parents are missing as well, and the film focuses on the pair struggling to understand the nature of the supernatural entity that has come into their home. The visuals and sound design of the film simulate the quality of VHS tapes. Skinamarink also uses an array of toys from the '90s, CRT television and older public domain cartoons to work within the analog horror subgenre.	Ball also made the proceeding 2020 short film Heck with a plot similar to Skinamarink.	
Somnium Dream Viewer	2022	Holly Fernwright	YouTube series about the fictional Somnium Technologies, who created a product in the 1980s that allowed users to print images of their dreams and caused extremely violent nightmares.		
The Suitmation Trials	2020	OmegaJira	An analog horror web series featuring a corrupted VHS tape of Godzilla Raids Again (1955).		
Super Mario 64: CLASSIFIED	2020	TetraBunz	Involves video recordings of a broken demo of said Nintendo 64 game, with a sentient Personalization AI named Stanley (who is a faceless Mario texture) who Really wants the player to leave.		
Surreal Broadcast	2020	RedDiamond	A collection of TV programs from different years in the small town of Berksaut, Maine, including one involving an animal bite incident from 1989.		
Teaching Jake about the camcorder, Jan ‘97	2021	Brian David Gilbert	An offscreen figure (presumably Jake) repeatedly rewatches videotapes of a father speaking to his son, Jake. Then, the tape is slowly corrupted by things like a humanoid silhouetted figure appearing, and the appearance of the father is repeatedly changing.		
This House Has People in It	2016	AB Video Solutions	Television feature created for Adult Swim (and inspired by The Blair Witch Project) which consists of surveillance footage of a suburban family during their son's birthday party.		
Transmission	2023	Michael Hurst	"The world's first channel-surfing" horror film involving a documentary about an occult-obsessed horror film director and his unfinished sci-fi epic Transmission, a local news segment on a string of murders and kidnappings, an 80s teen romance comedy, two puppets solving a jigsaw puzzle, an Elvira-like host presenting the "cursed" sci-fi flick, an evangelical pastor and a vintage black-and-white sitcom about a couple and their TV set each pieced together into one narrative.		
Valle Verde	2022	Alluvium	Video game involving a VHS recording of a PlayStation 1 Animal Crossing-esque title where its on-screen avatar is treated with distorted imagery of children, references to "unstable patients" and disturbing realms edging between the divine and demonic.		
Vita Carnis	2022	Darian Quilloy	Canadian mixed media project describing the rise of a branchlike, fleshy organism known as the Crawl, which first appeared in 1931. The Crawl can spawn different types of meat-based creatures during its life cycle, which are the focus of the series.		
The Walten Files	2020	Martín Paredes (as Martin Walls)	YouTube series inspired by the Five Nights at Freddy's franchise, which involves a set of videotapes. The tapes follow Bunny Smiles Incorporated, the defunct company behind the restaurant Bon's Burgers, which features Chuck E. Cheese-like animatronics, and the companies' two founders, Felix Kranken and Jack Walten, and their families. The animatronics are Bon the Dancing Rabbit, Sha the Sheep, Boozoo the ringmaster, and Banny the Bunny. It talks about the events that happen after the closing of Bon's Burgers, and the killings of "Bon", the mysterious spirit possessing Bon the Rabbit.	A handful of spinoff episodes have been released in the following years of the series' premiere, such as "The Mysterious House", "Boozoo's Ghosts" and "The Return of the Pumpkin Rabbit".	
Welcome Home	2023	Clown Illustration	Unfiction about an anonymous team of individuals and their attempt to restore a long-lost Muppet-inspired 1970s kids' puppet show featuring eight puppets and a sentient house that may have something sinister lurking behind the scenes.		
We'll Be Right Back	2022	TapeWorm	A series that revolves around television anomalies caused by the cable company TeleBlue's Tele-Freq feature, which enables television programming to "adapt" to what you're looking for. The anomalies occur because of V.A.L. (Virtual Analysis Line)		
White Stag Education	2022	After10 Productions	A series of educational video recordings from New Jersey involving masked "strangers" stalking hikers in the Pine Barrens and a biblical entity known as The Adversary.		
Winter of 83	2022	Lewis Lovhaug	YouTube series about the disappearance of an entire population of a small town in the winter of 1983 through a collection of video and audio tapes.		
WNUF Halloween Special	2013	Chris LaMartina	A 1980s television personality that decides to investigate strange supernatural occurrences at a house purported to be haunted.		
Woodlands National Park	2022	Buddy Films	The grim history of the park full of cover–ups, conspiracies and mysterious deaths involving a flesh–eating Wendigo and invisible creatures known as Walkers.		
The parallel	2025	LC/Lcrandom	An alternate world where many other creatures like Bipedal/Quadpedal Stalkers, Entities of Influence, Despair cullers, Tormenters, Virus, The list goes on.	It's very graphic and has good storytelling	

== See also ==
- Vaporwave
- Collage film
- Alternate reality game
- List of creepypastas
- Shot-on-video film
