= Out There Halloween Mega Tape =

- Directed by: Chris LaMartina
- Written by: Chris LaMartina
- Produced by: Chris LaMartina; Melissa LaMartina
- Starring: Melissa LaMartina; Ted Geoghegan; Katie Hidalgo; Shawn Jones; Mikael Simpson; Michael Varrati; Mike C. Walls
- Edited by: Chris LaMartina
- Production company: Midnight Crew Studios
- Distributed by: Camp Motion Pictures
- Release date: August 20, 2022
- Country: United States
- Language: English

Out There Halloween Mega Tape is a 2022 comedy horror film that was written and directed by Chris LaMartina. It is a sequel to his 2013 film WNUF Halloween Special; in initial promotional materials the film had the early title of WNUF Halloween Sequel.

The film's production was one of several movies impacted by the COVID-19 pandemic. The film premiered in August 2022 and was released directly to DVD by LaMartina.

== Synopsis ==
The film is set in the 1990s and presents itself as a copy of an episode of a daily talk show, as well as a recording of a live investigation into alien encounters. The first portion shows a Ricki Lake and Jerry Springer-esque talk show led by host Ivy Sparks, who features strange and unusual guests. The second portion is set some time later and also features a now disgraced Sparks, who is part of a live investigation into a farm rumored to be the site of inexplicable phenomena and alien encounters. The film also showcases several faux commercials, similar to the ones seen in the WNUF Halloween Special.

== Cast ==
- Melissa LaMartina as Ivy Sparks
- Ted Geoghegan as Perry Trenchard
- Katie Hidalgo as Hippie Audience Member
- Shawn Jones as Phil
- Mikael Simpson as Audience Member
- Michael Varrati as Mikael V. Aarti
- Mike.C Walls as Stefan

== Production ==
After finishing WNUF Halloween Special LaMantina wanted to create additional spoof commercials and after completing Call Girl of Cthulhu, began to consider creating another a spiritual sequel. He started writing the script around 2018 and chose to set it during the 1990s after reflecting on "the cultural evolution of local 80s UHF stations being bought up by big corporate media companies in the 1990s". LaMantina experienced some difficulties trying to replicate the feel of a video shot and recorded during the 1990s, as there had been several technological advances and changes since the 1980s. He began by creating spoof commercials as tests around 2015, before he had fully come up with the movie's concept or script.

Filming took place during the COVID-19 lockdown, forcing LaMantina to tweak or restyle several elements in order to follow lockdown protocol. Advertisements shot for the commercial segments included one focused around a politician named Dandridge who was running for Senate. LaMantina brought back Dandridge's political advertisement from the first film as "At Halloween, you always have election coverage, so obviously there are political ads, and now we have this [recurring character] Dandridge running for Senate", further noting that if there were a third film he would feature Dandridge running for President of the United States.

== Release ==
Out There Halloween Mega Tape premiered in both on August 20, 2022, in Long Beach, California and Baltimore, Maryland.

LaMartina decided against releasing the film through any VOD or streaming service, instead choosing to independently sell copies via his website in DVD format. A VHS copy was made available as part of a limited collector's set. LaMartina chose to release the film in this fashion due to two factors: "One was social media’s desire for urgency and the second was piracy." He argued that fans would want to see the film as quickly as possible and that the format also kept the movie from being easily bootlegged.

== Reception ==
Out There Halloween Mega Tape was praised by Dread Central and Nashville Scene, the latter of which commented that the movie was more polished than its predecessor and that it was "structurally innovative and deeply rewatchable".

=== Awards ===
- Best Writing for a Feature Film at the Nightmares Film Festival (2022, won)
