= Billy Club (film) =

- Directed by: Drew Rosas; Nick Sommer
- Written by: Drew Rosas; Nick Sommer
- Starring: Marshall Caswell; Erin Hammond; Nick Sommer
- Cinematography: Justin Russell
- Edited by: Drew Rosas
- Music by: Chris Fuller
- Production companies: D-Cent Entertainment; Decent Entertainment; Surgery Room
- Release date: October 1, 2013 (Milwaukee Film Festival)
- Running time: 94 minutes
- Country: United States
- Language: English

Billy Club is a 2013 independent comedy horror film directed and written by Drew Rosas and Nick Sommer. The film had its world release on October 1, 2013 at the Milwaukee Film Festival and focuses on four friends that reunite after a long time, only to have to overcome dark secrets from their past. Funding for Billy Club was partially received through a successful Kickstarter campaign.

== Synopsis ==
Fifteen years ago Bobby (Marshall Caswell) and his friends tormented their little league teammate Billy Haskins after he lost them a big game. In retaliation Billy murdered two of their teammates and their coach before he was stopped and placed in a mental institution. Bobby moved away afterwards, but has returned years later in 1996 to reconnect with everyone. This reunion is cut short when someone dressed as an old fashioned umpire begins killing any survivors from the team, making the survivors fear for their lives.

== Cast ==
- Marshall Caswell as Bobby Spooner
- Erin Hammond as Alison McKenzie
- Nick Sommer as Kyle Tripper
- Max Williamson as Danny Evans
- Mark Metcalf as The Umpire
- Mathew Dunlop as Devon
- Thaine H. Allison Jr. as Man Behind Gas Station
- Al Bardin as Sheriff Hicks
- Peter Batchelder as Sports Announcer
- Sebastian Weigman as Young Billy
- Suziey Block as Nurse
- Trevor Burke as Young Kyle
- Bobby Ciraldo as Cop 1
- Kelly Cunningham as Vanessa
- Michael Denk as Mitch
- Peter Donalds as Baseball Bar Patron
- Brody Drews as Young Danny

== Production ==
Rosas and Sommer, both of whom had worked together previously on the film Blood Junkie, began developing Billy Club as both wanted to "make a slasher movie in the vein of the classic boogie men movies of the ‘80s and ‘90s" and felt that the theme of baseball "lends itself to the horror genre really well". Funding was partially raised through a private investor as well as through Kickstarter. Sommer designed the killer's weapon to incorporate a "bolt-action retractable bayonet blade that comes out the end", as he wanted to make it different from the typical "baseball bat with nails in it". Filming took place in northern Wisconsin and several baseball players from McDonough, Georgia's Union Grove High School were brought on to portray the young versions of the main characters.

== Reception ==
Billy Club won the "Best Feature" award at the Hollywood Horror Fest, the "Best Horror Film" award at the Phoenix Film Festival, the "Award of Excellence" at Indy Fest, and the "Best Wisconsin Film" award at the Beloit International Film Festival. The film was also an official entry in the PollyGrind Film Festival, the Green Bay Horror Festival, and the Milwaukee Film Festival.

Shock Till You Drop rated Billy Club at a 5, stating that the film was "far from perfect", but that there was "real talent on display".

The official Billy Club poster created by Dog & Pony won the "Award of Distinction" at the 19th Annual Communicator Awards in 2013.

== Music ==
The band Alison's Mailbox, from Highland, Indiana, contributed two songs to the movie. "Just Askin'" and "The Feminine Song" are from the band's first official release titled "Alison's Mailbox". The four song tape was released March 4, 1995. "Just Askin'" can be heard at two spots in the movie, at 21:06 and 21:31. "The Feminine Song" can be heard at 56:12. The scenes include the songs playing on the radio in Billy's truck.

== See also ==
- The Catcher, a similarly themed film released in 1998.
