= The Monument Mythos =

YouTube analog horror webseries

- Genre: Analog horror Found footage Mockumentary; Political thriller
- Created by: Eve Casanas
- Written by: Eve Casanas
- Directed by: Eve Casanas
- Composer: Andrew Wilson
- Country of origin: United States
- Original language: English
- No. of seasons: 3
- No. of episodes: 38 (not including spinoff series episodes)

Original release
- Network: YouTube
- Release: September 26, 2020 – April 30, 2023

The Monument Mythos is a YouTube horror webseries created by Eve Casanas and set in a paranormal alternate history of the world, depicting supposed horrific secrets behind major monuments and landmarks across the United States and beyond. The episodes use analog horror, found footage, and mockumentary formats to depict the fictional US presidencies of J.D. Rockefeller, James Dean, Montgomery Clift, Al Gore, and Hillary Clinton, alongside various fictional conspiracy theories and inexplicable events. The debut episode, "Libertylurker" (stylized in all caps), released in September 2020 and depicted a massive, carnivorous beast contained in the pedestal of the Statue of Liberty, with further topics including Mount Rushmore or Alcatraz Island as they are affected by alternate realities or Lovecraftian entities. The first and last seasons were produced, each consisting of 11 episodes, while the second season had 13 episodes. The series originally ran from August 26, 2020, to April 30, 2023, having been expanded since. The storyline had been written in its entirety before the series' release, but in May 2021, the author began to make changes to it. The series' production included original music and voice acting.

== Spin-off series ==
A spin-off series titled The Nixonverse, set in a timeline in which former U.S. president Richard Nixon became a god, ran from May 14 to August 13, 2022. A compilation film, The Absolute Nixonverse, which added new sections and removed certain sections from the original series, was released on October 1, 2023, on the Dwight Comics YouTube channel.

A now defunct series and integrated into The Nixonverse, The House in the Ocean follows a Lovecraftian entity as the Crescent King and the House it lives in. The episodes focus on presidents including Ronald Reagan, Barack Obama, George W. Bush and others.

A second spin-off series titled The Trinity Desk Project (later renamed The American Anatomy), set in the "Deanverse" of the first two seasons, ran from Aug 29 to Nov 1, 2022. The series focused on the titular fictional offshoot of the Manhattan Project that created the first invisible objects, along with an invisible entity known as the "Other Oppenheimer" or "The Croatoan". Subplots of the series include a "front row" used to incinerate people at NASA launches and entities known as "DOCtors" (Defenders of the Organic Curtain). The series was later compiled into an episode of and absorbed into the next spin-off series, The Modern Day.

A third spin-off series titled The Modern Day, set in an alternate timeline in which English actor Robert Pattinson won the 2024 United States presidential election, ran from September 1, 2023, to February 29, 2024, with multiple episodes being released out of order. The series explored political subject matter much more directly than its sister series, including criticism of several political candidates, the political and social division caused by the United States' two-party system, and the dangers of nuclear weaponry. The series, along with season three of The Monument Mythos, was eventually removed from Casanas's YouTube channel for personal reasons.

A fourth spin-off series titled Alternate American Folklore began airing on October 4, 2024. The series mainly focuses on the effects of Western colonization of the Americas on Native Americans with episodes focusing on the Lewis and Clark expedition and the Seminole Wars.

A fifth and last spin-off series titled President Dean: The Series began airing on July 13, 2025. The series depicts James Dean living with his sister Eunice and meeting Richard Nixon.

In June and December 2025, Casanas re-uploaded significant amounts of lost content, including:

- The Monument Mythos Season 3 as a compilation of its teaser and episodes
- The Modern Day: A Monument Mythos Story as a compilation of its teaser and episodes
- Episodes of The Trinity Desk Project
- CORNERBABY, a lost part of the series CORNERFOLKLORE
- PYRAMIDPLASMA and restored_footage.mp4, two lost episodes of The Monument Mythos: Season Two
- A Monument Mythos, the final episode of The Monument Mythos
- leaked_photo.mp4, a standalone short film later related to The Monument Mythos

== Plot ==
Most episodes consist of mockumentary material gathered around a particular subject, such as the Washington Monument, Lincoln Memorial, Egyptian Pyramids, or Ever Given Suez grounding, and progressively diverge from real history over the course of the narrative. Recurring elements tying episodes together include "Special Trees", extradimensional organisms capable of bridging parallel universes; "Giza Glass", an extremely sharp material capable of beheading or dismembering humans without killing them; Maize, a massive technology monopoly analogous to Apple Inc.; and a sentient and violent Freedom armed with a Giza Glass sword. In-universe sources of information include the independent New Delaware Journal, an online video channel called Doctor Disturbing, and Maize's "TWTTR" social media platform.

President John D. Rockefeller is unintentionally responsible for an alternate World War I against Germany after allowing them to use Freedom's victims to power an alternate version of zeppelins. The airfleet is only defeated by a Giza glass-powered energy weapon, which unintentionally vaporizes the attending American soldiers and causes them to later coalesce into a figure nicknamed the "Air Force One Angel". James Dean survives his driving accident and enters politics as an anti-war progressive. He defeats Nixon's 1968 campaign in a blowout, apparently able to drive citizens into a frenzy of support at the slightest provocation. America under Dean suffers vicious domestic terrorist attacks by his opponents, who unite under the far-right and Christian fundamentalist Anti-Dean Association. The ADA then reorganizes into the Anti-Device Association with the rise of "TWTTR-Machines", and later into the Advocates for a Divided America after the contiguous States are unified into the Alcatraz, Rushmore, and Washington "Zones" to better contain paranormal phenomena.

Fictional characters include the Arnoldson family of dissidents and amateur investigators, in particular one Virginia Arnoldson who trades places with an alternate universe double after encountering a Special Tree in place of the Rockefeller Center Christmas Tree.

The penultimate episode reveals the Liberty Lurker to be an alternate George Washington, who was distorted and mutated into a cosmic being called the Horned Serpent. The finale compiles several segments; A final broadcast by the NDJ's editor, revealed to be Virginia's husband Leonard, who claims that the bacteria-like organism formerly contained in the Alcatraz Zone has consumed all of America overnight, replacing it with a perfect simulacrum on a molecular level. The Angel destroys the ADA after they attempt to weaponize it, leading the US government to goad it into a battle with Freedom. Their encounter instead destroys the Earth and releases the Horned Serpent in the "Great Division" prophesied by the ADA as reality collapses. Surviving humans are either absorbed by the Serpent or transformed into two-dimensional "Cornerfolk" capable of traversing the multiverse.

=== Nixonverse ===
The Great Division grants access to another timeline far closer to real history, with the main exception of humanity encountering a trio of superheroes over the course of the Twentieth century: The D-Day Knight, the Last Son of Alcatraz, and the Queen of the Lunarians. Ed Dwight is selected for the Apollo moon landings, becoming one of the first to encounter the alien Lunarians.

The Last Son intervenes in the Korean War to stop the US, but is defeated and captured in a nuclear bombardment. The government uses a Lunarian eye to brainwash him into believing he is Jesus Christ, and he instead participates in US atrocities in the Vietnam War. After the war he escapes their influence and attempts to build a new, peaceful identity as the House in the Ocean, but is instead attacked by the Lunarians and transformed into a being called the Crescent King to lead their invasion of Earth. The D-Day Knight is brought out of hiding to fight them, and begins remembering his life in what appears to be the Monument Mythos universe. Dwight encounters Nixon on the moon, who confirms he is from the James Dean timeline, having gained godlike powers after separating himself from the Horned Serpent, and that he created the superheroes to test how the Richard Nixon timeline would react to a being of his power. The Queen offers for the D-Day Knight to become the Lunarians' Prince, but he rejects her and uses the last of the "Alcatraz matter" to destroy the Lunarians as Nixon accepts he must then erase both himself and the Crescent King to restore the correct timeline. A final monologue reveals the Nixonverse to be the real world after Nixon rewrites all four superbeings to have been fictional characters, with Dwight remaining on Earth to create his own "monuments" as an artist.

=== Season 3 ===
Season three of the Monument Mythos continues the story after the fictionalization of the Nixonverse, following the story of Everett Arnoldson, The Air Force One Angel, and Cthonauts. After the Great Division and the recollection of the universe, Mars was nuked by Elon Musk and the Mars Serpent was awakened, and it is revealed that Earth and Venus also have serpents inside of them. All of the three serpents were given divine power after imitating Entropis and killing all the gods before placing themselves within the planets in a rest-like state. After the division, Cthonaut A speaks to the Angel, telling it to "divide until you no longer can" so that the ashes would spread throughout time and change the course of history. This prevents the great division from happening, due to the ashes of the Angel affecting the past Angel. Cthonaut A says that he would need to see "a true act of kindness" in order to leave the universe. After Everett sees the Martian Serpent, he decides to save everyone from "the hell above". He then goes to Freedom and the Angel, telling them to unite into "a more perfect union", and then defeating the Martian Serpent by sacrificing themselves.

=== "The Modern Day" ===
"The Modern Day" is the fourth season of The Monument Mythos. It shows that Alcatraz created two beings, the Monument Monster and the Debate Demon. In 2024, Robert Pattinson wins the election, and is driven mad by the two beings. He sends off missiles, destroying the Earth and causing Alcatraz to become a god. Since the Demon and Monster didn't want to be reabsorbed by Alcatraz, they and Cthonaut A leave the universe and into an empty one. It is revealed that either the Demon or Monster created the "Deanverse", the universe where seasons 1 and 2 take place.

=== Alternate American Folklore ===
In this universe, many presidents such as Andrew Jackson and Lyndon B. Johnson are shown to be actual monsters in office, unlike the Horned Serpent who was replaced with a double. During Columbus' voyage to the Americas, a "Ship Jester" is shown with them, walks the plank, and hides in the ocean for hundreds of years. It is shown that during the Lewis and Clark expeditions, Clark and President Jefferson's inside joke of "Paper York", being made of letters, is treated better than the actual York, and York is eventually ambushed by Paper York. After this, Paper York becomes a Special Tree and sends Thomas Jefferson to Wonderland and fuses York with him, making the Ship Jester. During the Civil War, Abraham Lincoln listens to music and is able to have a bird's eye view of the country. He stops listening to music, with the last ever time he did being his assassination date, and is implied to have been sent to the Moon. Later, Paper York is cut down and erected in Rockefeller Plaza, and is implied that Virginia Arnoldson came from this universe. During the Vietnam War, Everett Arnoldson, who is revealed to be Dorian E. Vask in this world, comes out of Wonderland and is shown to have American Wonderland Syndrome (AWS). He is drafted to fight in Vietnam. Later, York's wife who was replaced with a paper copy, Aiyana, is shown to be the Queen of the Lunarians in this universe. The Jester, wanting to see Aiyana again, is sent up and fuses with her to form the Crescent King. Somewhere around this time, Native Americans land on the Moon. Extronauts are also sent to the Moon and instigate the First Lunarian War after seeing Abraham Lincoln's hat. After this, it is implied Maize Machines has the powers of fictionalization, and makes any events revolving around Paper York "fictionalized history".

=== President Dean: The Series ===
This series is related to Seasons 1-2 about President Dean. In The Nixonworld, James Dean meets Richard Nixon that they worked with their elections, then he has a sister named Eunice Dean who he lives with, at least, he died in 1955 during a car crash and whenever people ask questions about James Dean and Richard Nixon: "Who was President James Dean?", "Did President Dean visit the Soviets?", "Did President Dean have Lincolnlookers?", "Did President James Dean Die?" and "Was there a god inside the Lincoln Memorial?", then people find out what lies inside President Dean's story.

== Reception ==
Nestor Kok of F Newsmagazine described the series in positive terms in 2022, writing: "There is nary an analog horror series, let alone a YouTube web series of any genre, that comes close to matching the scope and ambition of 'The Monument Mythos'." According to Joe Hoeffner of Collider in 2023, the series was among the most popular entries into the genre, alongside Local 58, Gemini Home Entertainment, and The Mandela Catalogue, all of which have "increasingly elaborate backstories and mythologies, usually parceled out one cryptic piece at a time"; however, he singled out The Monument Mythos as being particularly engaging for its narrative puzzles. At the same time, he commented that the approach risks becoming clichéd. Tilly Lawton of Pocket Tactics classified the series as a type of an alternate reality game, albeit one with a "[narrative] that [doesn't] alter regardless of player participation" (using the novel term "unfiction"). According to the author in 2022, a community of followers was gathering in the series' Discord server, where various thematic events were organized.
