= You Can't Kill Stephen King =

- Promotional poster
- Directed by: Ronnie Khalil; Monroe Mann; Jorge Valdés-Iga
- Written by: Monroe Mann; Ronnie Khalil; Bob Madia
- Produced by: Ronnie Khalil; Monroe Mann
- Starring: Monroe Mann; Ronnie Khalil; Crystal Arnette; Kayle Blogna; Kate Costello; Justin Brown; Polly Humphreys; Arthur S. Brown; Michael Bernstein
- Cinematography: Jorge Valdés-Iga
- Edited by: Gabriel Cullen
- Music by: Bruce Chianese
- Production companies: Loco Dawn Films, Clownfish Productions, The Maine Studios
- Distributed by: Big Screen Entertainment Group
- Release date: April 14, 2012 (Lewiston Auburn)
- Running time: 86 minutes
- Country: United States
- Language: English

You Can't Kill Stephen King is a 2012 American comedy horror spoof film that was directed by Monroe Mann, Ronnie Khalil, and Jorge Valdés-Iga, and is the directorial debut of Khalil and the feature film directorial debut of Mann. The film had its world premiere on 14 April 2012 at the Lewiston Auburn Film Festival and was later released to DVD on 9 December 2014 through Big Screen Entertainment Group. The film follows a group of friends that decide to visit the area horror author Stephen King lives, but find themselves threatened with their own potential deaths.

== Summary ==
Siblings Monroe (Monroe Mann) and Hilary (Crystal Arnette) have discovered that they have inherited a lake house and to make things even better, the famous horror author Stephen King is rumored to live somewhere nearby. They decide to take their friends down to the lake house to check things out, only to find immediate resistance from all of the locals, who insist that King doesn't live in the area. Despite being completely unwelcome, they decide to stay and soon find that people are being killed one by one in a manner similar to several deaths in various Stephen King stories.

== Cast ==
- Monroe Mann as Monroe Bachman
- Ronnie Khalil as Ronnie
- Crystal Arnette as Hilary Bachman
- Kayle Blogna as Nicole
- Kate Costello as Lori
- Justin Brown as Lamont
- Polly Humphreys as Deedee
- Arthur S. Brown as Dale
- Michael Bernstein as Verrill

== Reception ==
DVD Talk gave a mostly favorable review for the film, writing that while it wasn't "outstanding" the film was overall enjoyable and "a well-made and good looking film" as long as viewers did not have overly high expectations. HorrorNews.net was more negative in their review, criticizing the film for being neither innovative nor artistic while also praising it for embracing the "obvious clichés".

=== Awards ===
- People’s Choice – Best Feature film Award at the Lewiston-Auburn Film Festival (2012, won)
