= A Very Flattened Christmas =

2024 film directed by Shane Wallace

- Directed by: Shane Wallace
- Written by: Key Tawn Toothman; Shane Wallace
- Screenplay by: Shane Wallace
- Produced by: Key Tawn Toothman
- Cinematography: Wynn Ponder
- Music by: Daron Kalp
- Production company: Different Day Pictures
- Distributed by: Different Day Pictures
- Release date: September 21, 2024
- Running time: 95 minutes
- Country: United States
- Language: English

A Very Flattened Christmas is a 2024 comedy horror film directed by Shane Wallace. Starring Key Tawn Toothman who also produced the film. It had a limited theatrical release by Different Day Pictures on September 21, 2024, followed by a digital release on October 24.

== Premise ==
Picking up 6 years after “Flattened” the series. During Christmas, employees of a roadkill collection company are killed by a man wearing a reindeer mask.

== Cast ==
- Key Tawn Toothman - Max Peters
- Trevor Vincent Farney - Dan
- Mark Mannette - Dale
- Mark D. Anderson - Detective Bradley
- Jesse Bailey - Rick
- Shanna Berry - Francine
- John Doornbos - Stewart
- Lucas Farney - Red Eyes
- Noah Farney - Bobby
- Blaine Frazier - Dale Jr.
- Beckie Jenek - Jerry-Ann
- Dean Kavivya - Reginald
- Paula Makar - Loribelle

== Reception ==
In his review on Film Threat, Bobby Lepire rated it a 7/10 saying that "all the actors have solid comedic timing, while the reveal of the killer makes sense ... a lot of fun".

== See also ==
- List of comedy horror films
- Christmas horror
- List of Christmas films
- List of holiday horror films
- Simultaneous release
