= The Mandela Catalogue =

2021 YouTube analog horror web series

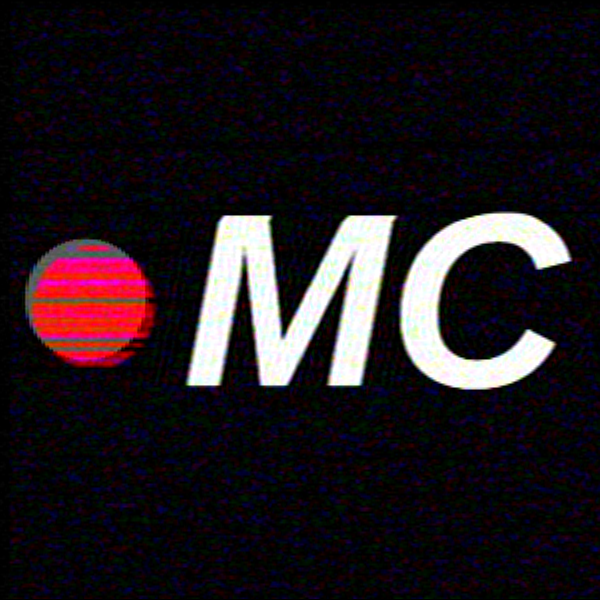
- The series' logo
- Genre: Found footage; Analog horror; Psychological horror; Body horror; Surrealism; Anthology; Digital horror (Act II exclusive)
- Created by: Alex Kister
- Showrunner: Alex Kister
- Written by: Alex Kister; Thorne Baker ("every day gets brighter")
- Directed by: Alex Kister
- Composer: Thorne Baker
- Country of origin: United States
- Original language: English
- No. of seasons: 2
- No. of episodes: 19

Production
- Production location: Wisconsin
- Animator: Alex Kister

Original release
- Network: YouTube
- Release: June 9, 2021 – present

Related
- Mystifying Oracle

The Mandela Catalogue is an analog horror franchise created by American YouTuber Alex Kister, created in 2021.

Primarily taking place between the 1990s and early 2010s, (Note: Certain excerpts not a part of the series' main storyline, such as VHS tape recordings and drawings, are set in the 1970s and 1980s.) the series is set in the fictional Mandela County and focuses on the invasion of otherworldly entities referred to as "Alternates" that psychologically torture their victims, often to the point of suicide, with the ultimate goal of assuming their identities as doppelgängers.

As of July 2026, the series comprises two acts totaling six volumes and thirteen shorter installments, usually focused on smaller aspects of the overarching story. Upon its inception, the series became popular online, in part due to reaction videos and story analyses of it by internet users and YouTubers. A film adaptation co-written and directed by Kister is in development from United Artists, Amblin Entertainment, and Paper Street Pictures.

== Premise ==
Set primarily in the early 1990s and late 2000s, The Mandela Catalogue takes place in the fictional Mandela County, Wisconsin, which is terrorized by shape-shifting creatures called Alternates. Alternates, led by a false depiction of the Archangel Gabriel, are nearly immortal beings that aim to eradicate humanity by psychologically torturing them to the point of suicide. The Alternates can manipulate audiovisual media, such as televisions, personal computers, and vehicle GPS systems.

== Episodes ==
=== Act I (2021–2022) ===
No.	Title	Directed by	Written by	length	Original release date
1	"overthrone"	Alex Kister	Alex Kister	4:01	June 9, 2021
A corrupted tape recording of The Beginner's Bible. It depicts an alternate version of the Nativity of Jesus wherein Satan, masquerading as Gabriel, deceives Man during the annunciation to the shepherds, declaring that he is their "true savior". The episode ends with a monologue from an unknown figure, who says that they have been shackled within a tomb of sand and pleads, 'If there is a God... please help me.'
2	"The Mandela Catalogue Vol.1"	Alex Kister	Alex Kister	15:09 (Original); 17:29 (Restored)	August 9, 2021 (Original); April 4, 2023 (Restored)
This collection features four tapes tied to the Alternate takeover. They include a PSA on spotting and avoiding Alternates, an evidence reel about the death of 17-year-old Mark Heathcliff, a 911 operator training video on handling calls involving Alternates, and a video designed to test young children’s reactions to certain audio and visual cues.
3	"intruder alert"	Alex Kister	Alex Kister	5:47	August 18, 2021
The video opens with a PSA about the dangers of leaving unsupervised children to watch TV because of harmful content on numerous channels. In one example, a woman hears her child crying in front of the TV. She enters the room while the child’s cries continue, despite a broadcast warning against it. Inside, she finds the missing child, but a face on the TV smiles at her, prompting her to take her own life by hanging. This is followed by an emergency alert about the threat and the gathering of police evidence from the scene, where the possibility of the threat being an Alternate is dismissed.
4	"exhibition"	Alex Kister	Alex Kister	8:32	October 30, 2021
An evidence reel from the Heathcliff case reveals that Mark Heathcliff had been stalked by Alternates for weeks before his death, leading an investigator, Thatcher Davis, to conclude that Mark had been in a prolonged "paranoid" state. Another Beginner's Bible tape depicts an alternate version of the Genesis flood narrative in which Satan/"Gabriel" punishes Noah for "resisting [his] message" and tells him that he will bring another creature, most likely an alternate, onto the Ark, which will bear his "last message".
5	"The Mandela Catalogue Vol.2"	Alex Kister	Alex Kister	20:34	January 18, 2022
Amateur paranormal investigators Adam Murray and Jonah Marshall, both wanted by the FBI, respond to a woman’s report of a ghost cat at her home. Adam explores the empty house, finding nothing unusual except a locked door, while Jonah considers leaving until a scream echoes from inside. Adam continues searching and eventually falls asleep on a couch. As he sleeps, an Alternate whispers to him through his walkie-talkie, urging him to wake up, before appearing in front of him. When Adam wakes, the door is unlocked, and he hears the ghost cat’s meows from within. Jonah warns him not to enter, hinting they won’t find someone important to Adam, whose name is censored, but Adam ignores him and goes in. Inside, he discovers an analog TV broadcasting the ominous face from “intruder alert” with a message for him. Meanwhile, dashcam footage shows Jonah driving away as another Alternate infiltrates his GPS, mocking him for abandoning Adam. Jonah eventually pulls over on the roadside and is presumably killed.
6	"The Mandela Catalogue Vol.333"	Alex Kister	Alex Kister	26:41	June 3, 2022
Lynn Murray calls her ex-husband, Jude, about their young son who won’t stop crying. Jude agrees to come over and help figure out the problem. Two police evidence reels play: the first covers Mark Heathcliff’s death, with an Alternate of Mark’s best friend, Cesar Torres, identified as the perpetrator. Mark’s notebook details his descent into madness during his final days. The second reel involves Jude, Lynn, and their son, implied to be a young Adam Murray. A recovered tape shows a children’s TV broadcast featuring a crude puppet named Stanley, instructing kids on creating an “imaginary friend” that will appear in their home. Immediately after, a frantic 911 call from Jude to Thatcher Davis reports a home intruder. Thatcher and his partner, Ruth Weaver, respond, but the “imaginary friend” kills Ruth off-screen. The creature, a different form of Alternate, reveals itself and attacks Thatcher.
7	"every day gets brighter"	Alex Kister	Thorne Baker	2:26	June 6, 2022
In a tape recording addressed to Ruth Weaver, Thatcher Davis expresses his hidden fears and promises he will kill the alternate from Vol. 333 who has since impersonated him.

=== Act II (2022–present) ===
No.	Title	Directed by	Written by	length	Original release date
8	"interlude"	Alex Kister	Alex Kister	3:22	September 5, 2022
A report for Mandela County shows the county population dropping from 15,000 in 1992 to barely 1,000 in 2009. A video from "BPS Productions 2007", sent to Adam Murray by Sarah Heathcliff, Mark's younger sister, contains a propaganda tape from the USDTP which congratulates the public and law enforcement for helping eliminate "an unforeseen threat". The tape cuts to a guide on three types of Alternate "assimilations": Flawed, Complete, and Overdriven. The video cuts to an image of Mark's house and the church from Exhibition with ambient screaming.
9	"The Mandela Catalogue Vol.4"	Alex Kister	Alex Kister	40:53	November 25, 2022
In a retelling of the Book of Genesis, Gabriel gives Adam an apple from the Tree of Knowledge. In 2009, after Vol. 2, Adam's ex-girlfriend, Evelin Miller, works for Dave Lee, finds the "Child Stress Assessment" tape from Vol. 1, and watches it on Dave's hidden TV. Adam argues with Sarah Heathcliff, the founder of BPS, through the "Dove Messenger" web service about his response to Jonah's death and agrees to make a memorial video. Thatcher mourns Ruth Weaver as his alternate watches from the closet. During Jonah's memorial video, Evelin discusses Adam's concerning behavior as Adam tries to talk over his own repeating voice. A promotion for "Face Studio 2" explains how users can make a 3D head based on photos of their own face, glitching to show Lynn's corpse. Dave visits a cathedral to find O'Brien, who had offered him a job there. The sky darkens as O'Brien reveals himself to be Gabriel, that Dave "has already done all of his bidding", and kills him. After being fired by Dave, Evelin heads to the vacant MCPD station in hopes of landing a job. While there, she discovers paperwork showing that Adam, as a toddler, failed to respond to any stimuli during a Stress Assessment test. Suddenly, the station loses power, alarms blare, and Evelin comes face-to-face with an Alternate. Meanwhile, Adam is contacted by a mysterious user who introduces himself as the Intruder, along with Stanley and the face on the TV. He informs Adam that he is an Alternate. The video concludes with images of Adam’s face, rendered in the style of Face Studio 2, flashing on the screen.
10	"THE BEGINNER'S BIBLE "THE STORY OF EASTER" CLIPS CIRCA1995"	Alex Kister	Alex Kister	2:00	April 8, 2023
(This video comes from the other YouTube channel "GENESIS APOCRYPHON" which is officially part of the series.) Mary Magdalene, a biblical figure, is depicted in a video where guards and nuns, representing her biblical figures Joanna and Martha, encounter a cave where they discover 'Gabriel', implying Jesus is in the tomb.
11	"mandela catalyst"	Alex Kister	Alex Kister	7:49	April 16, 2023
A news report on Dave's death glitches to reveal text reading "NO MORE RUNNING AW[AY]". Sarah and Evelin discuss Adam's behavior. A darkly lit bedroom is seen; a lamp is turned on to reveal an alternate in the doorway. Audio from Dave's autopsy reveals both of his eyes are missing and his brain is behaving abnormally. Gabriel, standing atop Thatcher's home, asks him if he "hears the screaming" and that he should "go and see". Thatcher drives to Adam’s house and finds the place in chaos. A radio suddenly turns on, crackling with distorted audio before a deep male voice delivers an ominous, cryptic message. Entering Adam’s bedroom, Thatcher sees him slumped motionless against his bedside table. The camera zooms in, showing the words “suspect identified” scrolling across the screen, but Thatcher drops it as Adam starts screaming in agony, pleading for Thatcher to kill him. The video cuts to a white screen with a pixelated smiley face in the corner while Adam’s muffled screams continue.
12	"Presto"	Alex Kister	Alex Kister	6:19	August 12, 2023
A television spot advertises MandelaTech's going-out-of business sale. Evelin and Sarah hack into the store's security cameras to try to find Dave. While the two speak on a call, Sarah is disconnected, and her computer connects to the security cameras at the police station. Security camera footage captures Thatcher and Adam chatting at the station about Adam’s experiences, where Adam says he was told he’s “paying the price” for Jonah’s death. When Thatcher asks who told him, Adam replies that it was God.
13	"1_19_09 221a"	Alex Kister	Alex Kister	0:29	August 22, 2023
(This video comes from the other YouTube channel "GENESIS APOCRYPHON" which is officially part of the series.) The video begins with an "ON AIR" sign, gradually deteriorating to a low-quality view of the wall, ground, and window. The screen then turns black, and Adam's drawings of 'Gabriel' and The Intruder are shown. The video ends with a picture of St. Gabriel's Church and the text "answers lie beneath."
14	"2:38"	Alex Kister	Alex Kister	5:57	February 8, 2024
The video starts with a compilation of funny Vine videos from 2015, but during a clip of someone dressed as Pennywise the clown, the footage cuts to a dark room, where the only light is from behind a door. Once its doorknob begins to turn, the video cuts back to the vine compilation.
15	"The Mandela Catalogue Vol.5"	Alex Kister	Alex Kister	33:07	June 24, 2024
In 1992, a man, later revealed to be Jude Murray (Adam Murray's father), attempts to use a service called "Midwestern Relocation Services" to start a new life in British Columbia. While in the safe house waiting to be picked up, he is attacked by an Alternate known as N, who has already appeared in “The T.H.I.N.K. Principle” segment of Volume 1. The plot weaves in a stop-motion animation about a shepherd trying to communicate with the Holy Spirit, but instead encountering Alternates. About halfway through, it’s suggested that this shepherd is likely the one speaking at the end of “overthrone,” based on the similarities between his surroundings and the dialogue. The episode closes with Jude Murray lying paralyzed in his bed, pleading for help as the Alternate stands across the room.
16	"Unraveling, Pt.1"	Alex Kister	Alex Kister	4:17	August 14, 2024
A screen recording of a "get ready with me" TikTok short that loops, becoming progressively more corrupted each time.
17	"Unraveling, Pt.2"	Alex Kister	Alex Kister	10:48	October 30, 2024
Dave Lee testing the recursive generation loss of VHS tapes, with the copies of the original tape very quickly deteriorating before an [most likely] alternate attack.
18	"Cognitohazard"	Alex Kister	Alex Kister	7:44	April 4, 2025
On a forum site, two users start chatting about good places to take kids to play in Southern Wisconsin. The discussion shifts to Mandela County, and soon the second user begins showing unsettling behavior, sharing sensitive details with the intent to cause M.A.D. toward the other user.
19	"The Mandela Catalogue Vol.6"	Alex Kister	Alex Kister	26:33	March 13, 2026
Caught in a raging thunderstorm, two sailors spot a woman calmly standing on the water. As they watch, a narrator reflects on the respect for life and existence shared among different animal species, the notion of alternates holding dominion over humans, and the belief that whoever watches over humanity also honors the balance of nature. In 2011, Julie calls her friend Amanda to share that she’s seen some videos, including one of Addison from "Cognitohazard" taking her own life after a conversation she had. Amanda tries to reassure Julie about what she discovered, and then their friend Noah joins the call, mentioning that Adam reached out to him and is seeking advice. Picking up from the 2009 scene in "Presto," Thatcher talks with Adam, who admits the alternates want him to spread their messages. Thatcher says he still has hope, but Adam disagrees and makes his escape. Amanda and Noah head to the location Adam described—a dilapidated house deep in the forest. Inside, Amanda discovers a room full of mirrors. Julie calls, saying she’s found more videos and warns that “he” is in the house, before the call abruptly cuts off. A video of Addison’s death begins to play. Adam, in his alternate form, begins ripping his own face apart. Noah explores Adam’s house while Amanda waits in the car. Adam calls out from the mirror room, appearing behind one of them, now grotesquely large, repeating the same sentence. He chases Noah out of the house, and the camcorder dies. Meanwhile, a story is told of a hunter who sees his reflection commit suicide, with a river in the background.

== Characters ==
=== Main characters ===
- Thatcher Davis (portrayed by Thorne Baker) - Former Lieutenant of the Mandela County Police Department. After the death of a colleague at the hands of an Alternate, Thatcher's main goal is to defeat the Alternate who killed his colleague and stop all Alternates once and for all.
- Adam Murray (portrayed by Ty Osborne) - Member of the Bythorne Paranormal Society, a club of people who investigate paranormal activity. After being abducted as a child by an Intruder/6, Adam tries to find his missing mother and discovers a life-changing secret in the process.
- Sarah Heathcliff (portrayed by Rachel Ridley) - She’s the founder of the Bythrone Paranormal Society, driven by the loss of her brother in an Alternate attack after the police ignored his pleas for help. Now, she’s determined to uncover the truth about the Alternates and take down the police department as payback for her grief.
- Evelin Miller (portrayed by Spidey) - Ex-girlfriend of Adam Murray. She broke up with Adam because of an inexplicable personality change, and she wants to find out the reason with the help of Sarah Heathcliff.
- Mark Heathcliff (portrayed by Alex Kister) - Brother of Sarah Heathcliff. After being tricked by an Alternate into coming to his deceased friend's house, he becomes trapped in his house and is afflicted with M.A.D., causing him to go insane and commit suicide.
- Cesar Torres (portrayed by Andrew Long) - Friend of Mark Heathcliff. Assimilated by an Alternate, and this Alternate is responsible for Mark's death. Not much more is known about him.
- Jude Murray (portrayed by Michael Vale) - The husband of Lynn and, more importantly, the father of Adam. He called the MCPD for help and later fled to another precinct after losing his family.

=== Supporting characters ===
- Ruth Weaver (portrayed by Bee "Fruitmasseuse" L) - Thatcher's fellow officer and MCPD sergeant who was killed by the Murray House Alternate, leading Thatcher to plan to defeat them in revenge.
- Jonah Marshall (portrayed by Gabriel Linan) - The third member of the BPS went to the house, thought to belong to the woman, with Adam at 3 a.m., unaware it was a trap. He eventually died, leaving his so-called “friend” Adam behind.
- Lynn Murray (portrayed by Lighth0use) - The wife of Jude and the mother of Adam. Committed suicide by hanging after realizing that the intruder had taken her son Adam.
- Dave Lee (portrayed by Alex Kister) - Manager of MandelaTECH (2000). Helped Thatcher Davis recover supernatural-themed VHS tapes. Employee/boss of Evelin Miller at MandelaTECH. Died to Archangel Gabriel after being tricked into getting a job at the local church.

=== Antagonists ===
- Archangel Gabriel (portrayed by eSpeak (Overthrone), Microsoft Sam (Exhibition, Vol. 5), Kyle DeNigris (Vol. 4)) - The first Alternate and the version of Satan in The Mandela Catalogue. He managed to take control of humanity by appearing as an Alternate of the real Gabriel. He is also the leader of the Alternates. He is the main antagonist of the story. There is much mystery behind this character, and many theories made by fans surrounding it.
- The Intruder/6 (portrayed by Microsoft Sam (Intruder Alert, Vol. 2), Leon Rodriguez (Vol. 4)) - The humanoid anomaly isn’t an Alternate but a dangerous ally of the Alternates and “Gabriel” in their fight against humanity. He’s behind the abduction of over three thousand innocent children, including Adam, and the tragic suicides of their grieving parents.
- The Murray Residence Alternate - Manifested through the television of Stanley/The Intruder and Adam after he killed Ruth Weaver. It even went further and haunted Thatcher seventeen years later.
- Cesar's Alternate - An alternate of Cesar. He assimilated Cesar and made his friend Mark paranoid after tricking him into going to Cesar's house (a trap that Mark was unaware of). He also drove him to suicide after probably telling him that his religion, Christianity, was a complete lie.
- The Preacher - An alternate of an elderly nun. Also known as a messenger. An alternate who stalked little Adam Murray (though he is often referred to as an infant despite being 4 years old) in his home before The Intruder kidnapped him along with over three thousand other children.
- N - One of the example alternates in the T.H.I.N.K Principle is the one that stalked and ultimately drove Jude Murray insane.

=== Cameo appearances ===
There were some cameo appearances from the old classic films that were only featured in Vol. 1 [RESTORED EDITION].

- Norman Kerry as Vicomte Raoul de Chagny & Mary Philbin as Christine Daaé from The Phantom of the Opera.
- Freddie Bartholomew as Cedric “Ceddie” Errol Jr. & Dolores Costello as Mrs. Cedric “Dearest” Errol from Little Lord Fauntleroy.
- Max Schreck as Count Orlok “Nosferatu” & Gustav von Wangenheim as Hutter from Nosferatu – A Symphony of Horror.

In the cartoon The Beginner's Bible, which appears in some cases, it is actually unknown which characters were dubbed, as each episode features the same voice actors in the credits without the characters' names. The only character known to have a voice actor is Adam, the first human created by God, who appears in The Mandela Catalogue Vol.2 and was voiced by Rich Swingle.

== Production ==
=== Early history ===
The Mandela Catalogue was created by then seventeen-year-old student Alex Kister from Richfield, Wisconsin as a series of short videos he began in 2021, while in summer college. It was Kister's first filmmaking project. Kister created "overthrone" [sic] as a one-off video based on a high school writing project, and planned to make a series where he edited children's cartoons to be creepy. However, due to the popularity of the video, Kister decided to continue making videos following the universe of "overthrone" into the modern day. He named the series after the Mandela Effect.

Kister had a low budget and used basic editing: scenes are shot in his home and characters are portrayed by his friends through still images and voiceovers. Kister’s mother once played an alternate.

Kister had said the series originally began as a creative outlet for the existential crisis he was dealing with, especially when it came to the subject of religion and Christianity. The series was also inspired by the isolation and loss of security Kister experienced as a result of the COVID-19 pandemic.

=== Themes ===
The series contains many biblical allusions, referencing Noah's Ark, Adam and Eve, Mary and Joseph, and the birth of Jesus. It is heavily implied that the Alternates are biblical demons, and that Archangel Gabriel is actually Satan in disguise.

=== Genre ===
The Mandela Catalogue is composed of 13 shorts and 6 volumes across two "Acts." The first short was released on June 9, 2021. The series belongs to a subgenre of horror dubbed analog horror. Series installments are usually presented as found footage material, or from the point of view of in-universe characters and/or their electronic devices. Nearly all the Act I installments are rendered in VHS quality, whereas most Act II installments are made in the style of old digital videos, reflecting the shift in the time period depicted. The series began to shift into mixed media following the early Act II installments.

== Reception ==
=== Audience reception ===
The Mandela Catalogue grew popular due to analysis and reaction videos on YouTube and quickly gained a following. Some users criticized an over-reliance on analog horror tropes. Vol. 4 received particular criticism for its use of live-action segments filmed with green screens. Some viewers disliked the scenes' lack of realism. However, Kister said the lack of realism was purposeful and an attempt to give the segments an uncanny valley quality.

=== Critical reception ===
Dread Central praised The Mandela Catalogue as "the supreme [example] of what analog horror looks and sounds like", adding that "the sense of insecurity that comes from knowing you’ll be frightened is constantly visually manipulated". Ohio University student newspaper The Post favorably compared its use of the uncanny valley as a horror technique to The Walten Files. It was also praised by GQ. While TLK Magazine praised the series' worldbuilding, it criticized the "monotone" voiceover acting, saying it detracted from The Mandela Catalogue's tone.

=== In popular culture ===
The series has also been parodied by other online creators. On June 30, 2022, animator Sr Pelo released The Mandela Magazine, an animated parody of The Mandela Catalogue that recreates and satirizes elements of Overthrone and Volume 1. The short received a positive response from series creator Alex Kister, who commented on the video. The Mandela Magazine subsequently became a notable parody of the series.

A TikTok trend based on The Mandela Catalogue became popular in 2023. In these videos, which often have a similar VHS aesthetic, a person realizes they are being hunted by their "Alternate" when a soundbite plays, saying: "If you see another person that looks identical to you, run away and hide".

== Other media ==
=== Merchandising ===
In October 2022, Kister worked with Makeship, a crowdfunding plushie company, to release merchandise for the series. In March 2024, Retro Release Video announced plans to release the first volume on VHS, though this was soon cancelled due to emerging abuse allegations against Kister. It would be re-announced in August 2024 after Kister denied most of the allegations and the allegations were proven false.

=== Games ===
The Indie games Maple County, Alternate Watch, and Assessment Examination are based on the series. In 2021, before his role on The Mandela Catalogue, actor Thorne Baker developed Maple County. The game is framed as an interactive training tape from the Maple County Police Department, in which players must determine which photos portray Alternates and which portray actual people. In Mandela Invasion, created by Broken Arrow Games, Alternates attempt to break into the player's house and must be repelled.

=== Film ===
In May 2025, Kister revealed that he had been working on a screenplay for a potential film adaptation of The Mandela Catalogue since June 2022. According to Kister, the script would tell the story of a group of high-school graduates struggling to maintain their reality after the disappearance of a student sparks a chain of unexpected and unsettling events. The film would combine traditional live-action and found footage elements. In July 2026, following a bidding war with 11 other studios, a feature length adaptation was confirmed to be in the works from Amazon MGM Studios' United Artists label, Amblin Entertainment, and Paper Street Pictures, with Kister attached to direct from a screenplay he co-wrote with Tyler Clifton. Steven Spielberg, Scott Stuber, and Aaron B. Koontz, among others, are attached as producers. In September 2026, it was given a release date of June 9, 2028.

== See also ==
- List of analog horror media
- Religious horror
