= Call Girl of Cthulhu =

- Film poster
- Directed by: Chris LaMartina
- Written by: Jimmy George; Chris LaMartina
- Based on: The writings of by H. P. Lovecraft
- Starring: David Phillip Carollo; Melissa O'Brien; Nicolette le Faye
- Cinematography: Nick Baldwin
- Edited by: Chris LaMartina
- Music by: Chris LaMartina
- Production company: Midnight Crew Studios
- Distributed by: Camp Motion Pictures
- Release date: May 8, 2014 (Maryland Film Festival)
- Running time: 92 minutes
- Country: United States
- Language: English

Call Girl of Cthulhu is a 2014 independently made horror film from Midnight Crew Studios that was directed by Chris LaMartina and stars David Phillip Carollo, Melissa O'Brien, and Nicolette le Faye. The film was distributed by Camp Motion Pictures and had its world premiere on May 8, 2014, at the Maryland Film Festival.

An artist falls in love with a woman who ends up being the chosen bride of Cthulhu. The film is very loosely based on the writings of H. P. Lovecraft.

Call Girl of Cthulhu makes reference to LaMartina's WNUF Halloween Special via the Shining Trapeze Strip Club, which is featured in a commercial shown during the film.

Virgin artist Carter (David Phillip Carollo) wants desperately to lose his virginity, but only to the right person. He thinks he has found the right person in Riley (Melissa O'Brien), a call girl with a strange birthmark on her right buttock.

Carter's dreams of romance are soon ruined, as several Cthulhu-worshiping cultists of the Church of Starry Wisdom see this birthmark as a sign that Riley is destined to become the bride of Cthulhu and bear his child.

It is up to Carter, aided by Edna Curwen (Helenmary Ball) and Squid (Sabrina Taylor-Smith), to find a way (with the aid of a spell from the Necronomicon) to stop the cult from fulfilling their plan to mate Riley to the Great Old One.

== In-jokes ==
The film contains numerous in-jokes referencing the names of Lovecraft stories and characters, including Deep Ones condoms and Cool Air aerosol.

== Cast ==
- David Phillip Carollo as Carter Wilcox
- Melissa O'Brien as Riley Whatley
- Nicolette le Faye as Erica Zann
- Dave Gamble as Sebastian Suydum
- Helenmary Ball as Professor Edna Curwen
- Sabrina Taylor-Smith as Squid
- Alex Mendez as Rick 'The Dick' Pickman
- Craig Peter Coletta as Wilbur
- Elena Rose as Whitney
- George Stover as Walter Delapore
- Leanna Chamish as Detective Rita LaGrassi
- Troy Jennings as Ashton Eibon
- Stephanie Anders as Missy Katonixx
- Ruby Larocca as Billie
- Scarlett Storm as Georgia

== Reception ==
Daily Dead gave Call Girl of Cthulhu a score of 3.5 (out of 5), stating that while the film was "not for everyone", it would appeal to "those of you Lovecraft (and horror) fans out there looking for something just a little bit outside the norm". Fangoria rated the film "three out of four skulls" and praised its acting.
