= Ronnie Khalil =

American actor and comedian (born 1977)

- Born: September 28, 1977 (age 49); Miami, United States

Comedy career
- Years active: 2006–present
- Medium: Stand-up
- Genres: Observational comedy, Satire
- Subjects: Arab culture, Parents, Marriage, Islamophobia, Culture, Islamic humour
- Website: www.ronniekhalil.com

Shaher "Ronnie" Khalil (born September 28, 1977) is an American stand-up comedian and actor of Egyptian descent. He has headlined across four continents, toured the United States as a guest performer with the “Axis of Evil”, performed with “Arabs Gone Wild” and taped two “Friday Night Live” Showtime Comedy specials in Dubai, including “Minorities Rule” and “New World Order”, both were shown across 14 countries in the Middle East. Ronnie has performed in sold-out shows across the Middle East and was part of the first-ever Amman Stand-up Comedy Festival in Jordan, as well as numerous other comedy festivals including the New York Underground, NY Arab-American, South Beach, Los Angeles and Boston Comedy Festivals. He was also twice invited to the Montreal Comedy Festival's "Just for Pitching." Ronnie has been featured on sketches for “Conan O'Brien”, ABC News, NPR, Air America, CNN and Al Jazeera, as well as in Comedy Central's online show "The Watch List", which was later picked up for a pilot, and A&E's "15 Films About Madonna."

Khalil is Executive Producer of the first ever Middle Eastern Comedy Festival in Los Angeles, which premiered September 2009, with the goal of changing stereotypes in the Hollywood entertainment industry.

Khalil grew up in Miami, FL, where he was a founding member of "The Miami Comics", an ethnically diverse group of stand-up comedians.

In addition to stand-up, Khalil earned his M.B.A. from the University of Miami, and lectures in colleges throughout the United States regarding success and motivation. His most popular lectures are “Success through C.O.M.E.D.Y.” and “Networking: How to Avoid Really Hard Work.” Both Khalil's parents were university professors, and his father is currently President of Nile University in Cairo, Egypt.
