= Alex Kister =

American YouTuber and filmmaker (born 2003)

- Born: July 24, 2003 (age 23); Richfield, Wisconsin, U.S.
- Occupations: YouTuber; video editor
- Years active: 2021–present

YouTube information
- Channel: Alex Kister
- Genres: Acting; analog horror; horror shorts
- Subscribers: 1.07 million
- Views: 73 million
- Last updated: July 25, 2026

Alex Kister (born July 24, 2003), is an American YouTuber, filmmaker, and video editor. In June 2021, Kister published the first episode of a soon-to-be viral web series, The Mandela Catalogue to his YouTube channel.

He is set to direct an upcoming film adaptation of the series, in development with United Artists, Amblin Entertainment, and Paper Street Pictures.

== Early life ==
Kister was born on July 24, 2003 and grew up in Richfield, Wisconsin. Kister attended the University of Wisconsin–Whitewater, where in the summer of 2021, he developed and released the debut video of the Mandela Catalogue series, titled "overthrone". It was Kister's first filmmaking project.

== Career ==
=== 2021–2022: The Mandela Catalogue - Act I ===
Initially planned as a one-off writing project, a seventeen-year-old Kister intended "overthrone" to begin a series of creepily edited children's cartoons. However, partially due to the effects of the COVID-19 pandemic, the video gained widespread attention online after receiving notice from popular YouTubers, resulting in reaction videos and analyses that would also gain traction. As of July 2026, "overthrone" has over 11 million views on YouTube. Following the success of "overthrone," Kister decided to continue the series set in the modern day with the video titled "The Mandela Catalogue Vol. 1," released in August 2021. He named the series after the Mandela Effect. The video once again received widespread attention, with many considering Kister's early videos the most popular examples of analog horror.

The first act stars Kister as Mark Heathcliff, Thorne Baker as Thatcher Davis, Ty Osborne as Adam Murray, Andrew Long as Cesar Torres, Gabriel Linan as Jonah Marshall, Michael Vale as Jude Murray, Bee "Fruitmasseuse" L as Ruth Weaver, and "Lighth0use" as Lynn Murray. Baker also serves as the composer for the series. The main antagonist, Gabriel, was voiced using eSpeak.

=== 2022–present: The Mandela Catalogue - Act II ===
Though most of Act I was presented in VHS quality, Act II instead took the style of old digital videos. This was done to reflect the general shift in time from Act I. The series shifted back into the form of VHS tapes later in Act II. Most of the live-action sequences of the series, especially in Act II, were filmed in the technique of found footage recordings.

Act II began with the episode "interlude" in September 2022. Baker, Osborne, and Vale would reprise their roles as Thatcher, Adam, and Jude respectively. Joining the cast would be Rachel Ridley as Sarah Heathcliff and "Spidey" as Evelin Miller. Kister would also appear in the second act, though as a different character, named Dave Lee. Kyle DeNigris would also voice Archangel Gabriel, replacing eSpeak. "The Mandela Catalogue Vol. 4" would receive backlash for its overuse of live action segments and poorly edited green screens. However, Kister would defend the episode's lack of realism, stating it was done to produce an uncanny valley tone.

In October 2022, Kister worked with Makeship, a crowdfunding plushie company, to release merchandise based on characters from the series. In 2023, The Mandela Catalogue gained renewed popularity via a video trend on TikTok, where the videos would share a similar VHS aesthetic to the series. A quote from "The Mandela Catalogue Vol. 1" was heavily quoted in the trend, stating that "If you see another person that looks identical to you, run away and hide".

=== Other ventures ===
In December 2022, Kister released a video titled "Mystifying Oracles 1 - Salutatio," the first in an intended trilogy centered around the main character Joel Hayes, played by Kister, attempting to communicate with spirits through a ouija board. Although Kister has stated it is a separate series from The Mandela Catalogue, he has ultimately placed both within the same shared universe. The series concluded in October 2023 with "Mystifying Oracles 3 - Limbo." In April 2024, Kister uploaded "Festival - Passing Through Indiana," the first in a science fiction horror web series. In July 2025, it was then followed up with a sequel, titled, "Festival Pt. 2 - Manmade Purgatory"

In May 2025, Kister revealed that he had been working on a screenplay for a potential film adaptation of The Mandela Catalogue. According to Kister, the script would tell the story of a group of high-school graduates struggling to maintain their reality after the disappearance of a student sparks a chain of unexpected and unsettling events. The film would combine traditional live action and found footage elements. In July 2026, following a bidding war with 11 other studios, a feature length adaptation was confirmed to be in the works from Amazon MGM Studios' United Artists label, Amblin Entertainment, and Paper Street Pictures, with Kister attached to direct from a screenplay he co-wrote with Tyler Clifton. Steven Spielberg, Scott Stuber, and Aaron B. Koontz, among others, are attached as producers. In September 2026, it was given a release date of June 9, 2028.

== Personal life ==
Consistently throughout The Mandela Catalogue, particularly in Act I, many biblical allusions would be referenced, including Noah's Ark, Adam and Eve, Mary and Joseph, and the birth of Jesus. Kister revealed he initially intended the The Mandela Catalogue to be a creative outlet for an existential crisis he experienced during the pandemic, primarily when it came to the subject of Christianity. Kister also used his own feelings of isolation and lack of security during the pandemic as inspirations for the mood of The Mandela Catalogue.

== Filmography ==
Web series

Year	Title	Director	Writer	Actor
2021–present	The Mandela Catalogue	Yes	Yes	Yes
2022-2023	Mystifying Oracles	Yes	Yes	Yes
2024–present	Festival	Yes	Yes	Yes

Feature film

Year	Title	Director	Writer
2028	The Mandela Catalogue	Yes	Yes
