= Drew Rosas =

American actor

Drew Rosas (born Andrew Rosas) is an American independent filmmaker operating out of Wisconsin.

== Filmography ==
- Plastic Fangs (2005, short)
- Independent Lens (2006, 1 episode Almost Home, as sound recordist)
- Lift (2006, short, as sound mixer)
- Table Talk (2007, short)
- Snare (2007, short, as sound editor)
- Handmade Nation (2009, as boom operator)
- Modus Operandi (2009, as Foley artist)
- Blood Junkie (2010)
- Pesticide (2010, short, as sound editor)
- Billy Club (2013)
- Hamlet A.D.D. (2014, as assistant director)
- Shangri-LA: Pilot (2016, Pilot Episode, as director, writer, editor, and executive producer)
- The Settlement (2018, series, as director, writer, and editor)
- Shangri-LA: Season 1 (2019, series, as director, writer, editor, and executive producer)

=== As actor ===
- Table Talk (2007)
- Modus Operandi (2009, as Horror Film Director)
- Billy Club (2013, as Officer Brackman)
- Pester (2014, as S.O.L.A. Member - TV Commercial)
- Hamlet A.D.D. (2014, as Daniel / Nathaniel)
