= Chris LaMartina =

American film director, writer, and producer

Chris LaMartina is an American director, writer, and producer that works out of Baltimore, Maryland.

The youngest of three children, early childhood influences include the film Night of the Demons, the animated series The Real Ghostbusters and the stories of his grandmother in the oral tradition. He studied film at Towson University, during which time he filmed the 2007 movie Dead Teenagers.

He is known for his motion pictures, WNUF Halloween Special (2013) and Call Girl of Cthulhu (2014). Since 2011, he has been working in marketing and advertising as a Creative Director as well as Director of Storytelling for several mid-Atlantic-based ad agencies.

== Filmography ==
- Dead Teenagers (2007)
- Book of Lore (2007)
- Grave Mistakes (2008)
- President's Day (2010)
- Lost Trailer Park: Never Coming Attractions (2010 - 2011, 9 episodes)
- Yestermessenger (2011)
- Witch's Brew (2013)
- WNUF Halloween Special (2013)
- Call Girl of Cthulhu (2014)
- What Happens Next Will Scare You (2020)
- Out There Halloween Mega Tape (aka WNUF Halloween Sequel) (2022)
- Amanda the Adventurer (2023, live-action segments)
