= President's Day (film) =

- Film poster
- Directed by: Chris LaMartina
- Written by: Jimmy George; Chris LaMartina
- Produced by: Jimmy George; Chris LaMartina
- Starring: Bennie Mack McCoy IV; Lizzy Denning; Shawn C. Phillips; Nicolette le Faye
- Cinematography: Joe Davidson
- Edited by: Chris LaMartina
- Music by: Chris LaMartina
- Production companies: Midnight Crew Studios; Nice Guy Productions
- Distributed by: Camp Motion Pictures
- Release date: February 15, 2010
- Running time: 80 minutes
- Country: United States
- Language: English
- Budget: $5'000

President's Day is a 2010 comedy horror film directed by Chris LaMartina. The film follows a group of high school students being hunted by a madman in an Abraham Lincoln disguise. The film had a limited release on Washington's Birthday in 2010 and was released to DVD on April 9 of the same year.

== Plot ==
Two high school students, Tom and his girlfriend Tara, are murdered in Tom's home by an unknown killer dressed in an Abraham Lincoln costume with an axe.

The next day, class joker Barry Olsen is quickly attracted to new student Joanna Bolen. After skipping class, Barry is advised to run in the student body election by Officer Kennedy in order to get to know Joanna. Some time later, one of the candidates, Maxine, is murdered outside the school by the killer. The next day, Maxine is reported missing along with Tom and Tara. Although this causes worry to Principal Huck, it doesn't bother the student favored to win, Chelsea Blythe, as it will increase her chance at winning.

Huck assigns Kennedy and Detective Kurtz to investigate the disappearances, but they don't get very far with it. At night, the killer kills another candidate, Christian, and one of the election advisors, Ms. Heath, at Christian's house. News of this reaches Kennedy, who also finds notes that sign him as the killer. Kennedy tells Barry to investigate the letters. Barry shows them to various students, but is only given an answer by the janitor, who shows him a picture of a ghostly Abraham Lincoln and also tells him that the killer resides in the school's fallout shelter.

Some time later, two other candidates, Billie and Dennis, and the janitor are killed. Joanna then tells Barry that she is dropping out of the election to help with Barry's campaign, which is neck and neck with Chelsea. Barry agrees to stay in the election if Joanna helps him with investigating the murders and disappearances. Kennedy then informs Barry that another candidate, Eddie, and teacher, Mr. Wright, are missing and that Kurtz only found Wright's house in disrepair and his dog dead. With Joanna's help, Barry goes to investigate Wright's house, but only finds Wright's dentures before Kurtz arrives.

Afterwards, another candidate, Michelle, is killed, which causes Huck and Vice Principal Mackey to cancel the election. The killer then kills teacher Mrs. Frederica, secretary Madeline and Huck himself. Kennedy then informs Barry that science teacher Mr. Roemer is the lead suspect as he recently quit and is attempting to frame Kennedy for a past incident. Kennedy also tells Barry that Joanna has a file from when she assaulted a teacher, but, when he confronts her about this, she tells him that the teacher was sexually abusing her and she storms off, leaving Barry alone in the investigation. Barry goes to Roemer's house, only to see Roemer get murdered by the killer.

Kennedy and Kurtz are given permission by Mackey to install a surveillance system in the school. Barry informs Kennedy of Roemer's death, who sends Kurtz to Roemer's house, where he finds all the bodies of the victims and the missing people, several of the bodies burned by sulfuric acid, as well as a note indicting Roemer of the murders. Barry then hears from the newscaster that Wright and Eddie's bodies had to be identified by dental records.

With the murders supposedly over, Mackey reinstates the election. Joanna and twins Jenna and Barbara plot for Barry to win. Joanna lures Mackey outside and the twins play a tape recorder of Chelsea belittling the entire student faculty and they change their votes to Barry. Although Barry has the highest votes, Chelsea is the victor, as Mackey is being held hostage by the killer. Joanna goes to the bathroom, where she finds the twins dead and is abducted by the killer.

Chelsea then finds a note supposedly from Kennedy to meet in the fallout shelter, but Kurtz discovers the killer killing Kennedy on the CCTV cameras. Barry goes back to Wright's house and finds that the dentures are gone. Chelsea finds a shrine to herself in the shelter and comes face to face with the killer. The killer is revealed to be Wright, having faked his own death and killed all of her opponents because he is attracted to her.

Wright offers Chelsea the chance to kill Joanna, but Chelsea instead lets her go, which quickly results in her death. Joanna escapes and runs past Kurtz, who is killed by Wright shortly afterwards. Barry arrives and, with Joanna's help, incapacitates Wright. They share a kiss until Wright yells at Barry "You weren't supposed to be president!", which results in Barry killing him with his axe.

Barry is elected student body president and the ending concludes with him being congratulated by Mackey, who only suffered a sprained neck, and the remaining students.

== Cast ==
- Bennie Mack McCoy IV as Barry Olsen
- Lizzy Denning as Joanna Bolen
- Nicolette le Faye as Chelsea Blythe
- Ryan Scott Thomas as Officer Kennedy
- George Stover as Leonard Wright
- Shawn C. Phillips as Dennis
- Ruby Larocca as Michelle
- Paul Fahrenkopf as Detective Kurtz
- Andrea Hern as Jenna
- Katie Hern as Barbara
- Lee Armstrong as Janitor
- Chris Magorian as Eddie Mills
- Mary Jane Oelke as Mrs. Frederica
- Ron LaMartina as George Roemer
- Matthew Bowerman as Merv Perkins
- D. Patrick Bauer as Tom Sachmore
- Carley Cooper as Billie Roscoe
- Sheldon Lawrence as Principal Huck
- Laura Scott Ferro as Vice Principal Mackey
- Regina E. Guy as Madeline
- Jesse Layne as Lorraine Heath
- Will Lurie as Christian Doddler
- Cory Mann as Tara Capo
- Carolyn Wasilewski as Maxine
- Melanie Glickman as Bored Student

== Reception ==
Bloody Disgusting gave President's Day four skulls and wrote that it was "a quantum leap forward for a fledgling filmmaker who has proven over the last 4-years that he’s more than capable making quality films for less." The Baltimore City Paper also praised the movie, which they called "a fun, wickedly entertaining slasher romp".
