= WNUF Halloween Special =

2013 American comedy horror film

- Promotional release poster
- Directed by: Chris LaMartina; James Branscome; Shawn Jones; Scott Maccubbin; Lonnie Martin; Matthew Menter; Andy Schoeb
- Screenplay by: Chris LaMartina; Jimmy George; Pat Storck; Michael Joseph Moran; Carley Cooper; Shawn Jones; Lonnie Martin; Scott Maccubbin; James Branscome; Matthew Menter; Andy Schoeb
- Story by: Chris LaMartina; Jimmy George; Jamie Nash
- Starring: Paul Fahrenkopf; Aaron Henkin; Nicolette le Faye
- Cinematography: Chris LaMartina
- Edited by: Chris LaMartina
- Production company: Midnight Crew Studios
- Release date: October 18, 2013
- Running time: 83 minutes
- Country: United States
- Language: English
- Budget: $1,500

WNUF Halloween Special is a 2013 American comedy horror analog horror film directed primarily by Chris LaMartina, who also helped to co-write the film. Parody commercials are shown throughout the film, some of which were written and directed by persons other than LaMartina. Its plot follows a television personality that decides to investigate strange supernatural occurrences at a house purported to be haunted.

A sequel was released in 2022 under the title Out There Halloween Mega Tape.

== Synopsis ==
The film presents itself as an off-air recording of television station WNUF's Halloween special that aired on October 31, 1987. The movie's main plot centers upon Frank Stewart (Paul Fahrenkopf), a television reporter that has decided to broadcast himself live as he and four other people (including the cameraman) investigate the Webber House, the site of the brutal murder of a husband and wife. Donald Webber, the suspected murderer and the couple's son, claims that he was commanded to murder his parents by demonic entities that he accidentally summoned using a Ouija board. Since that day, the house has been reported to be haunted and an anonymous police officer testifies that he and other fellow police officers have witnessed paranormal activity at the house. Frank initially treats the broadcast as a novelty, even going so far as to dismiss the concerns of paranormal investigators Louis and Claire Berger (Brian St. August and Helenmary Ball), as Claire immediately states that the house contains a menacing presence and that they are in danger as long as they are in the house. He tries to dissuade fears by bringing in Father Joseph Matheson (Robert Long II), who Frank claims is versed in Catholic exorcism rites, despite the priest's assertion that he only has a perfunctory knowledge of the rites and has never actually performed an exorcism.

As the film progresses the Bergers grow more and more tense, especially after Claire's cat Shadow (which she uses to help her with communications with the dead) goes missing. Frank manages to convince them to continue with the broadcast and hold a seance, even after their EVP recorder is smashed off camera by an unseen force. The couple finally leaves the house after their cat is discovered to have been brutally torn to pieces. Trying to keep the broadcast moving, Frank manages to convince a very reluctant Father Joseph to perform an exorcism, despite his protestations that the Church must approve all exorcisms. They move to the basement, where Father Joseph again tries to back out of the exorcism. As he begins to read the rites, the two hear a noise and try to go upstairs but find that they cannot leave the basement. As Frank grows more frantic, his producer Veronica (Nicolette le Faye) asks if the Bergers have returned to the house. The film then cuts to a commercial, after which Veronica is shown stating that she has sent an intern into the house with a camera to rescue the two men and to see what has happened as a whole. The frightened intern ventures into the house but is knocked over and presumably murdered by an unknown person wearing a flannel shirt. During this time the body of Claire Berger is shown on camera, which shows that the Bergers never made it out of the house and were both killed. Veronica frantically implores Frank to break down the door and leave the house, which prompts Frank to once again demand that Father Joseph perform an exorcism. Joseph then angrily states that he was not a priest and is only an actor, revealing that Frank has hired him to pretend to be a priest for the broadcast. As Veronica prepares to cut to commercial, Frank discovers that the basement door has opened and goes out the door, only to be knocked down by the unknown person. The station cuts to a technical difficulties screen followed by static, after which point the bodies of the Bergers, Joseph, cameraman, and intern are shown. Frank is shown to be alive and the assailants are proven to be a human man and woman, two insane religious people who were seen previously in the film stating that Halloween was evil and making various threats that people participating in the holiday were doomed. The man then films his female partner cutting out Frank's tongue before the man glibly wishes the audience a happy Halloween. The film ends with a brief moment of static before a clip is shown of two sober newscasters stating that Frank and the others are all missing. They do not mention the deaths, leaving it up to the viewer to determine if the clip shown was part of the live broadcast or if it was something added to a personal video tape, meaning that we are viewing the copy owned by the murderers.

Throughout the film several commercials and news segments are shown, ranging from advertisements for local businesses or future television broadcasts to a news story about a local dentist's "cash for candy" campaign. Some of these are shown in their entirety while others are fast forwarded through by an unseen viewer.

=== Commercials ===
- Parents Against Partying (written and directed by James Branscome)
- Phil's Carpet Warehouse (written and directed by Shawn Jones)
- King of Castle Lane (written and directed by Scott Maccubbin)
- MOUTH by Asphxia (written and directed by Lonnie Martin)
- Stay Sure Tampons (written and directed by Matthew Menter)
- Dandridge for Governor (written and directed by Andy Schoeb)
- The Shining Trapeze Strip Club (written by Carley Cooper)

== Cast ==
- Paul Fahrenkopf as Frank Stewart
- Aaron Henkin as WNUF Announcer (voice)
- Nicolette le Faye as Veronica Stanze
- Leanna Chamish as Deborah Merritt
- Richard Cutting as Gavin Gordon
- Brian St. August as Dr. Louis Berger
- Helenmary Ball as Claire Berger
- Robert Long II as Father Joseph Matheson
- Sabrina Taylor-Smith as Donna Miles
- Thomas Lee Johnson as Carl Durant
- Kendra North as Angela Harris
- Frederick Cowie as Officer Howard Bookwalter
- Bob Creager as Dr. Stanley Allen, DDS
- Ron LaMartina as Governor Mike Barlow
- George Stover as Dr. Bloodwrench

== Production ==
While filming, director Chris LaMartina tried to make the film closely resemble 1980s footage and shot on vintage tape stock. Of the WNUF Halloween Special, LaMartina stated that as most viewers would be able to instantly tell that the movie was not an actual broadcast from the 1980s they instead tried to "make people remind themselves why they fell in love with VHS and blatant localism in the first place" and that the movie is "a love letter to VHS and public access TV." LaMartina chose to include several faux commercials into the WNUF Halloween Special, as he wanted it to more closely resemble advertising for actual television shows, which will frequently interrupt a broadcast to repeat various commercials. Filming took place in an old rectory in Timonium, Maryland, and the crew made multiple copies of the film on several VCRs to degrade the film quality to where it would more closely resemble a bootleg VHS tape.

To publicize the film, LaMartina and the movie's producers left behind multiple VHS copies of the WNUF Halloween Special in various locations, such as a VHS convention in Pennsylvania, where they left them in bathrooms and tables. Their intent was that by doing this, they would start a successful whisper campaign.

== Reception ==
Critical reception for the WNUF Halloween Special has been positive. HorrorNews.net gave the WNUF Halloween Special a favorable review and commented that the movie had the potential to become a cult classic. Daily Dead and Dread Central also rated the film highly, and the Daily Dead wrote that it was "by far, one of the most enjoyable indie horror movies I’ve seen for some time."

== Sequel ==
During 2022 LaMartina announced a sequel to WNUF Halloween Special entitled Out There Halloween Mega Tape via social media; prior to this it was referred to as WNUF Halloween Sequel. He further stated that the film would simultaneously premiere on August 20, 2022, in Long Beach, California and Baltimore, Maryland. LaMartina released the film on DVD independently via his website and has stated that there were no current plans to license the film to a distributor or streaming services. A VHS copy was made available as part of a limited collector's set. A special cut of Out There Halloween Mega Tape was also screened at the Nightmares Film Festival in October 2022; Dread Central rated the film favorably and the movie received the festival award for Best Writing for a Feature Film. Nashville Scene favorably reviewed the movie, commenting that the movie was more polished than its predecessor and that it was "structurally innovative and deeply rewatchable".

The sequel is set in the 1990s and centers upon a talk show host sent to a farm rumored to have had several alien encounters. Production on the film was severely impacted by the COVID-19 lockdown and LaMartina reported that several elements had to be tweaked or restyled in order to follow lockdown protocol. He also noted that the 1990s was more difficult to portray due to the changes in technology from the 1980s.

== See also ==
- List of films set around Halloween
