= Blood Junkie =

- Directed by: Drew Rosas
- Written by: Drew Rosas
- Produced by: Drew Rosas
- Starring: Nick Sommer, Mike Johnson, Sarah Luther, Emily Treolo, Andrew Swant
- Cinematography: Michael Kubaszak, Drew Rosas
- Edited by: Drew Rosas
- Music by: Lodewijk Broekhuizen, Evan Murphy, Drew Rosas, Michael Stasny, Ryan Olson
- Production company: Surgery Room
- Distributed by: Troma Entertainment
- Release date: May 20, 2010
- Running time: 72 minutes
- Country: United States
- Language: English
- Budget: $7,000

Blood Junkie (originally filmed under the working title Rocky Trails) is a 2010 American independent comedy slasher film written and directed by Drew Rosas and starring Nick Sommer, Mike Johnson, Emily Treolo, and Sarah Luther. The story follows a group of teenagers who go out into the woods to party, but end up getting killed one by one.

== Premise ==
Several teenagers go out into the woods in order to have fun, drink alcohol, and smoke pot. While out there, Teddy (Mike Johnson) begins to tell the others stories about the old chemical plant. Years ago an explosion caused the closure of the plant and the body of the plant's night operator was never found. Teddy claims that he read in his grandfather's journal that there is a manbeast in the woods that would mutilate livestock. The group decides to travel to the old chemical plant to check it out, only to discover that there is something dangerous living there.

== Cast ==
- Nick Sommer as Craig Wilson
- Mike Johnson as Teddy Bender
- Sarah Luther as Laura
- Emily Treolo as Rachel
- Andrew Swant as The Creature
- Ross Bachhuber as Jef Bolstead
- Chris Chuzles as Hitchhiker
- Bobby Ciraldo as Billy the Butt
- Brady Cohen as Andy
- Kelly Cunningham as Rachel's Boobs
- Eric Gerber as Radio Reporter (voice)
- Kelly Hendzel as Speed Walker
- Carrie Hitchcock as Mrs. Bender
- Dave Kiehl as Hank Sanders
- Anne Killelea as Jenifer Gantly

== Production ==
Rosas has stated that he began working on Blood Junkie partially as "a retaliation against uber-stylized horror filmmaking and the unadulterated rebooting and mutilation of the classic 80s franchises" but also because it was "a stylistic choice based on the materials and film assets I had at my disposal". He created half of the music in the film using a Korg polysynth keyboard, and Rosas had several of his friends create the other portions of the movie's soundtrack. He had originally planned to make Blood Junkie as a short 30-40 minute film, but later decided to stretch the film into a feature-length film, adding more material to the film and allowing the actors to improvise on the set.

== Release ==
Blood Junkie premiered on May 20, 2010 in Milwaukee, Wisconsin at the historic Oriental Theatre, then screened at the Milwaukee Film Festival the following October. The film was released on DVD through Troma Entertainment in 2011 and was later available on Amazon Video, YouTube Movies & TV, Vudu, and other platforms.

== Reception ==
Critical reception for Blood Junkie was generally positive. Common elements of praise centered around Rosas's attempt to make the film feel as if it was made in the 1980s, and HorrorNews.net commented that they "would not have known the difference" if they had not known the film's creation date beforehand. The reviewer for Ain't It Cool News marked the film as one of their favorite horror films released so far that year, saying that at first they "wondered if this was untalented folks making a bad film or if it was talented folks going out of their way to make a good film that looks like a bad film. Turns out it is the latter." The San Francisco Bay Guardian called it a "keeper" and said that Troma "can't help but release a good movie once in a while."

JoBlo.com gave the movie a more mixed review, saying that the homages in the movie felt a little "too derivative, without adding much of a twist to the 80s horror conventions" but that ultimately "the effort is still there to provide some nostalgic entertainment, and that's the big thing." ReelFilm panned the movie overall, stating that it was a "well-intentioned yet entirely underwhelming low-budget effort."
