= Found footage film =

Film genre

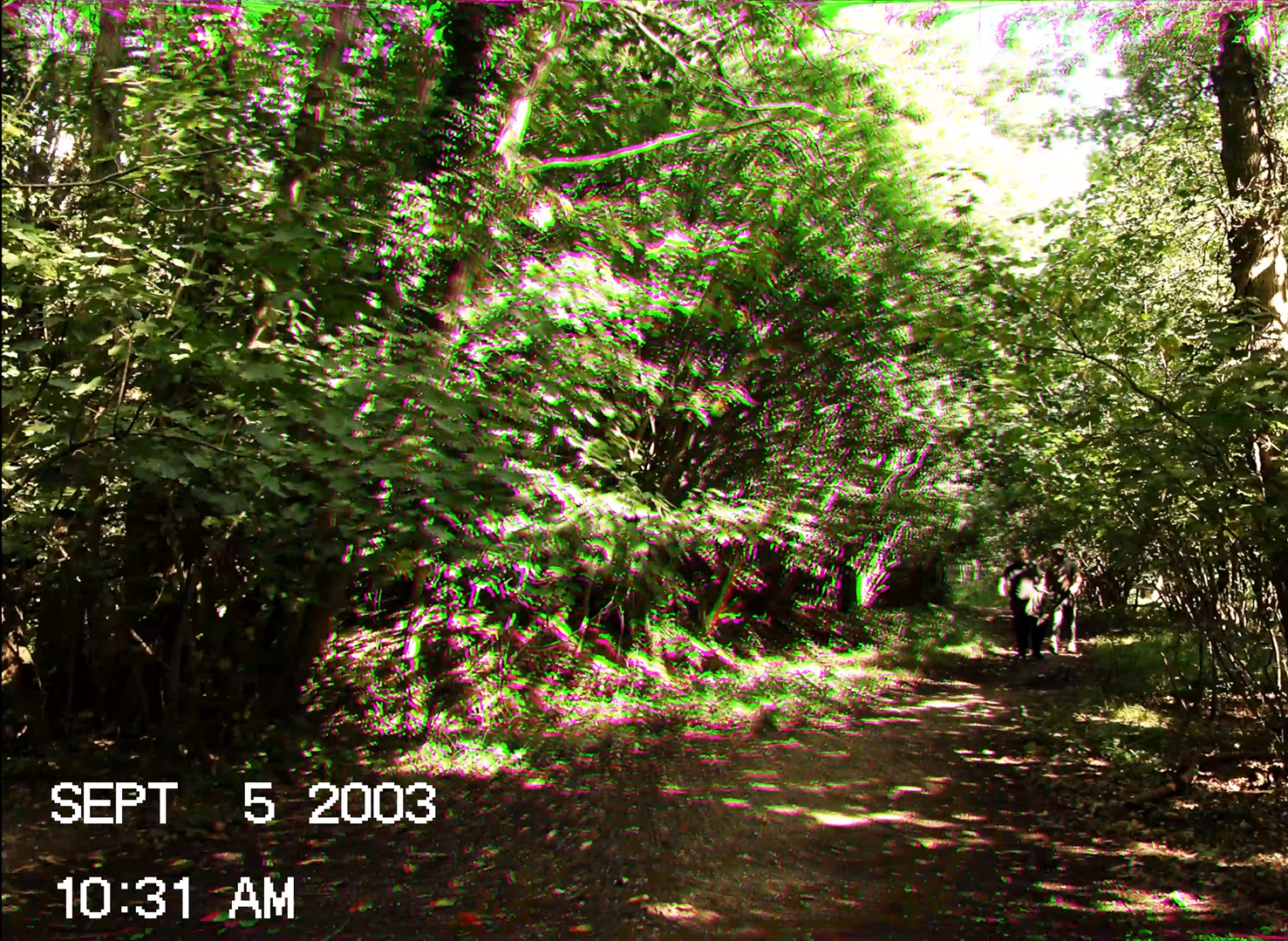
An example of a found footage film frame

Found footage is a cinematic technique and film genre in which all or a substantial part of the work is presented as if it were film or video recordings recorded by characters in the story, and later "found" and presented to the audience. The events on screen are typically seen through the camera of one or more of the characters involved, often accompanied by their real-time off-camera commentary. For added realism, the cinematography may be done by the actors themselves as they perform, and shaky camera work, improvisation and naturalistic acting are routinely employed. The footage may be presented as if it were "raw" and complete or as if it had been edited into a narrative by those who "found" it.

The technique is most commonly associated with horror films, particularly Cannibal Holocaust, The Blair Witch Project, Paranormal Activity, and Rec. It has also been used in science fiction, drama, comedy, crime, experimental film, and other genres.

Found-footage films generally make the recording device part of the story world rather than using the invisible camera of conventional narrative cinema; the images may come from handheld cameras, fixed surveillance cameras, or other recording devices.

== History ==
As a storytelling technique, found footage has precedents in literature, particularly in the trope of found manuscript, as well as epistolary novel, which typically consists of either correspondence or diary entries, purportedly written by a character central to the events. Like found footage, the epistolary technique has often been employed in horror fiction: both Dracula and Frankenstein are epistolary novels, as is The Call of Cthulhu by H. P. Lovecraft.

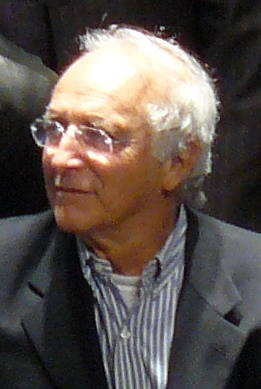
Ruggero Deodato, director of Cannibal Holocaust (1980)

Earlier films used versions of the device. Shirley Clarke's The Connection (1961) presents itself as footage shot by a documentary crew, while the birthday-party sequences in Orson Welles' The Other Side of the Wind, which began filming in 1970 but was not released until 2018, are assembled from footage recorded by people attending the party. In horror, Cannibal Holocaust (1980) is widely regarded as a foundational work of the found-footage form. After Cannibal Holocaust, there were a few found footage films, but they were mostly obscure. Early examples include the films Manson Family Movies (1984) and The Last Broadcast (1998).

Les Documents Interdits (1989–1991) used many of the techniques later associated with found footage. Michael Gingold of Fangoria has described the 1993 film America's Deadliest Home Video as an early example of the format in horror and crime cinema. The Blair Witch Project (1999) brought found-footage horror into the mainstream. Reviewing V/H/S in 2012, Scott Tobias of The A.V. Club compared the genre's growth in the 2000s and 2010s to the popularity of slasher films in the 1980s.

Found footage is also well suited to low-budget filmmaking, as its rough, amateur-video aesthetic can help give the images a sense of authenticity.

== Analysis ==
Film scholar David Bordwell has criticized the term "found footage" for fictional films, noting that it had already been used for films assembled from pre-existing material. He uses "discovered footage" for films such as The Blair Witch Project and Cloverfield, comparing the device to the literary tradition of the found manuscript.

The Unnamed Footage Festival in San Francisco uses the broader term "in-world camera" for films in which the recording device exists within the fictional world, encompassing found footage as well as related forms such as screenlife and faux documentary.

In a 2016 Cinema Journal article, film scholar Cecilia Sayad argues that found-footage horror plays with the boundary between fiction and reality through framing, both by presenting the film as documentary material and through the use of handheld cameras and static shots. Discussing the Paranormal Activity films, Sayad notes that timestamps and cameras placed throughout the characters' homes give viewers access to time and space beyond that of a conventional narrative film. At the same time, the limits of the frame leave viewers watching for threats that may remain unseen.

Sayad contrasts found-footage horror with self-conscious horror films such as Scream. While Scream openly presents itself as fiction, she argues, found footage presents its images as real even as unstable framing draws attention to what the camera can and cannot show.

== List ==
=== Films ===
The following entries are notable films in the found footage genre, though some were only partially made in that style.

Title	Release year	Director(s)	Production company	Ref(s)
Peeping Tom (partially)	1960	Michael Powell		
The Connection	1961	Shirley Clarke	The Connection Company	
Coming Apart	1969	Milton Moses Ginsberg	Kaleidoscope Films	
Punishment Park	1971	Peter Watkins	Chartwell; Francoise	
Cannibal Holocaust (partially)	1980	Ruggero Deodato	F.D. Cinematografica	
Special Bulletin	1983	Edward Zwick	Ohlmeyer Communications Company	
Manson Family Movies	1984	John Aes-Nihil	Aes-Nihil Productions	
Guinea Pig: Devil's Experiment	1985	Satoru Ogura	Sai Enterprise	
UFO Abduction	1989	Dean Alioto	IndieSyndicate Productions	
84C MoPic	1989	Patrick Sheane Duncan	New Century Vista Film Company	
Man Bites Dog	1993	Rémy Belvaux; André Bonzel; Benoît Poelvoorde	Les Artistes Anonymes	
Forgotten Silver	1995	Peter Jackson	WingNut Films	
Little Sister	1995	Robert Jan Westdijk	Grote Broer Filmwerken CV	
Alien Abduction: Incident in Lake County	1998	Dean Alioto	Dick Clark Productions	
The Last Broadcast	1998	Stefan Avalos; Lance Weiler	FFM Productions	
The Blair Witch Project	1999	Daniel Myrick; Eduardo Sánchez	Haxan Films	
The St. Francisville Experiment	2000	Ted Nicolaou	The Kushner-Locke Company	
August Underground	2001	Fred Vogel	Absu Films; Toetag Pictures	
Gang Tapes	2001	Adam Ripp		
Series 7: The Contenders	2001	Daniel Minahan		
The Collingswood Story	2002	Mike Costanza	Cinerebel Media	
August Underground's Mordum	2003	Fred Vogel; Killjoy; Cristie Whiles; Jerami Cruise; Michael T. Schneider	Toetag Pictures	
The Great American Snuff Film	2003	Sean Tretta	Ominous Productions	
The Last Horror Movie	2003	Julian Richards	Prolific Films; Snakehair Productions	
Zero Day	2003	Ben Coccio	Professor Bright Films	
Incident at Loch Ness	2004	Zak Penn	Eden Rock Media	
September Tapes	2004	Christian Johnston	Complex Films; Raz Productions; Raz Entertainment; Persistent Entertainment	
LolliLove	2004	Jenna Fischer	LolliLove Productions	
Noroi: The Curse	2005	Kōji Shiraishi	Xanadeux Company	
Behind the Mask: The Rise of Leslie Vernon	2006	Scott Glosserman	GlenEcho Entertainment; Code Entertainment	
Alone with Her	2006	Eric Nicholas	Pin Hole Productions LLC; The Weinstein Company	
The Zombie Diaries	2006	Kevin Gates; Michael Bartlett	Off World Films; Bleeding Edge Films	
State's Evidence	2006	Benjamin Louis	Terra Entertainment	
The Hunt	2007	Fritz Kiersch	Graymark Productions; Azisa Pictures	
Welcome to the Jungle	2007	Jonathan Hensleigh	Steelbridge Film Works; Bauer Martinez Studios; Valhalla Motion Pictures	
The Poughkeepsie Tapes	2007	John Erick Dowdle	Brothers Dowdle Productions; Poughkeepsie Films	
August Underground's Penance	2007	Fred Vogel	Toetag Pictures	
Redacted	2007	Brian De Palma	Magnolia Pictures	
Long Pigs	2007	Chris Power	Clowns After Midnight Productions; Jordan Entertainment; Chris Bridges Effects Studio	
Head Case	2007	Anthony Spadaccini	Fleet Street Films; B.P.A. Productions Group, Inc.	
Exhibit A	2007	Dom Rotheroe	Warp Films	
Paranormal Activity	2007	Oren Peli	Solana Films; Room 101, Inc.	
Death of a Ghost Hunter	2007	Sean Tretta	Ominous Productions	
Live!	2007	Bill Guttentag	Atlas Entertainment	
Rec	2007	Jaume Balagueró; Paco Plaza	Castelao Producciones; Filmax	
Look	2007	Adam Rifkin	Captured Films	
Surf's Up	2007	Ash Brannon; Chris Buck	Sony Pictures Animation	(Note: although animated, it is done in the style of found footage)
Monster	2008	Erik Estenberg	The Asylum	
Cloverfield	2008	Matt Reeves	Bad Robot	
Diary of the Dead	2008	George A. Romero	Artfire Films; Romero-Grunwald Productions	
Lake Mungo	2008	Joel Anderson	Screen Australia	
Home Movie	2008	Christopher Denham	Modernciné	
Bryan Loves You	2008	Seth Landau	Seth Landau	
Quarantine	2008	John Erick Dowdle	Vertigo Entertainment; Andale Pictures; Filmax Entertainment	
Occult	2009	Kōji Shiraishi	Image Rings; Creative Axa Company Ltd.	
Evil Things	2009	Dominic Perez	Go Show Media	
District 9	2009	Neill Blomkamp	QED International; WingNut Films	
Trash Humpers	2009	Harmony Korine	Alcove Entertainment; Warp Films; O' Salvation	
Rec 2	2009	Jaume Balagueró; Paco Plaza	Castelao Producciones; Filmax	
Murder Collection V.1	2009	Fred Vogel	Toetag Pictures	
Paranormal Entity	2009	Shane Van Dyke	The Asylum	
Lunopolis	2010	Matthew Avant	Media Savant	
Love Sex aur Dhokha	2010	Dibakar Banerjee	Freshwater Films	
Eyes in the Dark	2010	Bjorn Anderson	Emerald City Pictures	
Hotel Hollywood	2010	Param Gill	G S Productions	
Shirome	2010	Kōji Shiraishi	Stardust Promotion; Shirome Project Partners	
Bachiatari Bōryoku Ningen	2010	Kōji Shiraishi	Creative AXA	
The Last Exorcism	2010	Daniel Stamm	Strike Entertainment; StudioCanal; Arcade Pictures	
Undocumented	2010	Chris Peckover	Sheperd Glen Productions	
The Virginity Hit	2010	Huck Botko; Andrew Gurland	Gary Sanchez Productions	
8213: Gacy House	2010	Anthony Fankhauser	The Asylum	
Atrocious	2010	Fernando Barreda Luna	Nabu Films; Silencio Rodamos; Programa Ibermedia	
Paranormal Activity 2	2010	Tod Williams	Blumhouse Productions; Solana Films; Room 101, Inc.	
Trollhunter	2010	André Øvredal	Filmkameratene A/S; Film Fund FUZZ	
Unaware	2010	Sean Bardin; Robert Cooley	Cooley Productions	
Paranormal Activity 2: Tokyo Night	2010	Toshikazu Nagae	Presidio Corporation	
Anneliese: The Exorcist Tapes	2011	Jude Gerard Prest	The Asylum	
The Tunnel	2011	Carlo Ledesma	DLSHS Film; Distracted Media; Zapruder's Other Films	
Megan Is Missing	2011	Michael Goi	Trio Pictures	
Grave Encounters	2011	The Vicious Brothers	Twin Engine Films	
World of the Dead: The Zombie Diaries 2	2011	Kevin Gates; Michael Bartlett	Off World Films; Bleeding Edge Films; Straightwire Entertainment Group	
Hollow	2011	Michael Axelgaard	Hollow Pictures; Tribeca Film	
Untitled	2011	Shaun Troke	Shaunywa Films	
Apollo 18	2011	Gonzalo López-Gallego	Bazelevs	
388 Arletta Avenue	2011	Randall Cole	Copperheart Entertainment	
The Tapes	2011	Scott Bates; Lee Alliston	Darkside Pictures; Pure Film Productions	
Paranormal Activity 3	2011	Henry Joost; Ariel Schulman	Blumhouse Productions; Solana Films; Room 101, Inc.	
The Amityville Haunting	2011	Geoff Meed	The Asylum; Taut Productions	
Chō Akunin	2011	Kōji Shiraishi	Tokyo Raiders	
The Devil Inside	2012	William Brent Bell	Insurge Pictures	
V/H/S	2012	Ti West; Joe Swanberg; David Buckner; Adam Wingard; Glenn McQuaid	Radio Silence Productions; The Collective; Bloody Disgusting	
Chronicle	2012	Josh Trank	Davis Entertainment	
Project X	2012	Nima Nourizadeh	Silver Pictures; Green Hat Films	
Evidence	2012	Howie Askins	RynoRyder Productions	
Area 407	2012	Dale Fabrigar; Everette Wallin	Suzanne DeLaurentiis Productions; Cloud Nine Pictures; Entertainment Factory	
Hate Crime	2012	James Cullen Bressack	Psykik Junky Pictures	
Apartment 143	2012	Carles Torrens	Werc Werk Works; Kasdan Pictures; Likely Story	
Alien Origin	2012	Mark Atkins	The Asylum	
100 Ghost Street: The Return of Richard Speck	2012	Martin Anderson	The Asylum	
The Dinosaur Project	2012	Sid Bennett	Moonlighting Films	
Shopping Tour	2012	Michael Brashinsky	Duty-Free Productions	
A Night in the Woods	2012	Richard Parry	Vertigo Films	
End of Watch	2012	David Ayer	StudioCanal	
The Conspiracy	2012	Christopher MacBride	Resolute Films and Entertainment	
Grave Encounters 2	2012	John Poliquin	Arclight Films	
Paranormal Activity 4	2012	Henry Joost; Ariel Schulman	Blumhouse Productions; Solana Films; Room 101, Inc.	
The Bay	2012	Barry Levinson	Baltimore Pictures; Haunted Movies; Alliance Films; IM Global; Hydraulx Entertainment; Automatik Entertainment	
A Haunted House	2013	Michael Tiddes	Open Road Films	
30 Nights of Paranormal Activity with the Devil Inside the Girl with the Dragon Tattoo	2013	Craig Moss		
The Upper Footage	2013	Justin Cole		
Dabbe: Curse of the Jinn	2013	Hasan Karacadağ	Hasan Karacadağ	
Devil's Pass	2013	Renny Harlin	Aldamisa Entertainment; Non-Stop Productions; Midnight Sun Pictures; K. Jam Media	
The Frankenstein Theory	2013	Andrew Weiner	Rocket; Inner Station; Therapy Content; Arctic Film Group	
Cult	2013	Kōji Shiraishi		
Willow Creek	2013	Bobcat Goldthwait	Jerkschool Productions	
V/H/S/2	2013	Simon Barrett; Jason Eisener; Gareth Evans; Gregg Hale; Eduardo Sánchez; Timo Tjahjanto; Adam Wingard	The Collective; Bloody Disgusting; 8383 Productions; Snoot Entertainment; Haxan Films; Yer Dead Productions	
Europa Report	2013	Sebastián Cordero	Wayfare Entertainment Ventures	
The Borderlands	2013	Elliot Goldner	Metrodome Distribution	
The Paranormal Diaries: Clophill	2013	Kevin Gates; Michael Bartlett	Second Sight Films	
Head Cases: Serial Killers in the Delaware Valley	2013	Anthony Spadaccini	Fleet Street Films; B.P.A. Productions Group, Inc.	
The Dirties	2013	Matt Johnson	SModcast Pictures	
Frankenstein's Army	2013	Richard Raaphorst	Dark Sky Films; Pellicola; XYZ Films	
Sx Tape	2013	Bernard Rose	Aeroplano; La.Lune Entertainment	
Hooked Up	2013	Pablo Larcuen	Uncork'd Entertainment	
WNUF Halloween Special	2013	Chris LaMartina; James Branscome; Shawn Jones; Scott Maccubbin; Lonnie Martin; Matthew Menter; Andy Schoeb	Midnight Crew Studios	
Skinwalker Ranch	2013	Devin McGinn; Steve Berg	DeepStudios	
Unlisted Owner	2013	Jed Brian	Lawford County Productions	
6-5=2	2013	K. S. Ashoka	Swarnalatha Production	
Banshee Chapter	2013	Blair Erickson	Sunchaser Entertainment; Before the Door Pictures; Favorit Film	
Best Night Ever	2013	Jason Friedberg and Aaron Seltzer	Magnet Releasing	
What We Do in the Shadows	2014	Jemaine Clement; Taika Waititi	Resnick Interactive Development; Unison Films; Defender Films; New Zealand Film Commission	
Paranormal Activity: The Marked Ones	2014	Christopher Landon	Blumhouse Productions; Solana Films; Room 101, Inc.	
Devil's Due	2014	Matt Bettinelli-Olpin; Tyler Gillett	Davis Entertainment; 20th Century Studios	
Black Water Vampire	2014	Evan Tramel	BWV Productions; Ruthless Pictures	
Exists	2014	Eduardo Sánchez	Lionsgate Films; Haxan Films; Court Five	
The Den	2014	Zachary Donohue	Cliffbrook Films; Onset Films	
Mr. Jones	2014	Karl Mueller	Preferred Content; Preferred Film & TV	
Open Windows	2014	Nacho Vigalondo	Antena 3 Films; Apaches Entertainment; Spiderwood Studios; Wild Bunch; SpectreVision	
Afflicted	2014	Derek Lee; Clif Prowse	Automatik Entertainment; Téléfilm Canada	
Babysitting	2014	Nicolas Benamou; Philippe Lacheau	Axel Films; Madame Films; Cinéfrance 1888; Good Lap Production	
A Haunted House 2	2014	Michael Tiddes	IM Global Octane; Wayans Bros. Entertainment; Baby Way Productions	
The Sacrament	2014	Ti West	Worldview Entertainment; Arcade Pictures	
Alien Abduction	2014	Matty Beckerman	Exclusive Media Group; Big Picture; Next Entertainment; Lawrence Bender Productions; Mob Scene Creative Productions	
Inner Demons	2014	Seth Grossman	Schorr Pictures	
Earth to Echo	2014	Dave Green	Relativity Media	
666 the Devil's Child	2014	Manzie Jones	Fubot Pictures	
Into the Storm	2014	Steven Quale	New Line Cinema; Village Roadshow Pictures	
The Possession of Michael King	2014	David Jung	Gold Circle Films; Quickfire Films	
As Above, So Below	2014	John Erick Dowdle	Universal Pictures; Legendary Pictures	
A Record of Sweet Murder	2014	Kōji Shiraishi		
The Hunted	2014	Josh Stewart	Fortress Features; Allegheny Image Factory	
Alien Outpost	2014	Jabbar Raisani	Altitude Film Entertainment; Big Scope Films; Out of Africa Entertainment; Ravens Nest Entertainment; Rooks Nest Entertainment	
The Houses October Built	2014	Bobby Roe	Room 101; Foreboding Films	
Gore, Quebec	2014	Jean Benoit Lauzon	Green Lake Films	
The Taking of Deborah Logan	2014	Adam Robitel	Eagle Films; Millennium Entertainment	
Hangar 10	2014	Daniel Simpson	Newscope Films	
6-5=2	2014	Bharat Jain		
V/H/S: Viral	2014	Nacho Vigalondo; Marcel Sarmiento; Gregg Bishop; Justin Benson; Todd Lincoln	Bloody Disgusting; The Collective; Haxan Films	
The Pyramid	2014	Grégory Levasseur	20th Century Studios	
The Atticus Institute	2015	Chris Sparling	SND Groupe M6	
Project Almanac	2015	Dean Israelite	Insurge Pictures; Platinum Dunes; MTV Films	
Ratter	2015	Branden Kramer	Start Motion Pictures	
Digging Up the Marrow	2015	Adam Green	Ariescope Pictures	
Creep	2015	Patrick Brice	Blumhouse Productions	
Nightlight	2015	Scott Beck; Bryan Woods	Herrick Entertainment	
The Final Project	2015	Taylor Ri'chard	Cavu Pictures	
Unfriended	2015	Levan Gabriadze	Universal Pictures; Blumhouse Productions	
Always Watching: A Marble Hornets Story	2015	James Moran	Mosaic; Good Universe; GraceSam LLC	
Area 51	2015	Oren Peli	Paramount Pictures	
The Phoenix Incident	2015	Keith Arem	PCB Productions	
The Cutting Room	2015	Warren Dudley	Itchy Fish Film	
The Gallows	2015	Travis Cluff; Chris Lofing	New Line Cinema; Blumhouse Productions; Management 360; Tremendum Pictures	
JeruZalem	2015	Doron Paz; Yoav Paz	Universal Pictures	
The Visit	2015	M. Night Shyamalan	Blinding Edge Pictures; Blumhouse Productions; Universal Pictures	
Hell House LLC	2015	Stephen Cognetti	Cognetti Films	
Savageland	2015	Phil Guidry; Simon Herbert; David Whelan	The Massive Film Company	
Paranormal Activity: The Ghost Dimension	2015	Gregory Plotkin	Blumhouse Productions; Solana Films; Room 101, Inc.	
Be My Cat: A Film for Anne	2015	Adrian Țofei		
Found Footage 3D	2016	Steven DeGennaro	The Ubiquitous Studio 42	
They're Watching	2016	Jay Lender; Micah Wright	Best Served Cold Productions; Warsong Entertainment	
Aksbandh	2016	Emran Hussain	Cinematic Media	
Population Zero	2016	Adam Levins	A71 Entertainment	
Operation Avalanche	2016	Matt Johnson	Vice Films	
Blair Witch	2016	Adam Wingard	Lionsgate Films; Vertigo Entertainment; Room 101, Inc. Snoot Entertainment	
Bad Ben	2016	Tom Fanslau		
Capture Kill Release	2016	Nick McAnulty; Brian Allan Stewart		
The Dark Tapes	2017	Michael McQuown	Epic Pictures Group	
Phoenix Forgotten	2017	Justin Barber	Cinelou Films; Scott Free Productions	
The Monster Project	2017	Victor Mathieu		
The Houses October Built 2	2017	Bobby Roe	Foreboding Films	
#FromJennifer	2017	Frank Merle	Lone Morsel Productions	
Aliens: Zone of Silence	2017	Andy Fowler		
Creep 2	2017	Patrick Brice	Blumhouse Productions; Netflix	
One Cut of the Dead	2017	Shin'ichirō Ueda	Enbu Seminar	
Unfriended: Dark Web	2018	Stephen Susco	BH Productions; Universal Pictures	
Gonjiam: Haunted Asylum	2018	Jung Bum-shik	Hive Mediacorp	
The Devil's Doorway	2018	Aislinn Clarke	23ten	
The Other Side of the Wind	2018	Orson Welles	Royal Road Entertainment	
Hell House LLC II: The Abaddon Hotel	2018	Stephen Cognetti	Terror Films; Cognetti Films	
Butterfly Kisses	2018	Erik Kristopher Myers	Four-Fingered Films; Cyfuno Ventures	
Death of a Vlogger	2019	Graham Hughes		
Hell House LLC III: Lake of Fire	2019	Stephen Cognetti	Terror Films; Cognetti Films	
Skyman	2019	Daniel Myrick	Daniel Myrick Films; Red Arrow Studios; Hungry Bull Productions	
Insanity	2020	Miska Kajanus	Piilo Productions; Black Lion Pictures	
Hacksaw	2020	Anthony Leone	Leone Films	
Host	2020	Rob Savage	Shadowhouse Films; Shudder	
Human Hibachi	2020	Mario Cerrito		
M.O.M. Mothers of Monsters	2020	Tucia Lyman		
Spree	2020	Eugene Kotlyarenko	RLJE Films	
Scary Stories: Dark Web	2020	Bryan Renaud	Random Acts	
The Widow	2020	Ivan Minin	QS Films	
Horror in the High Desert	2021	Dutch Marich	Luminol Entertainment; Maya Aerials	
Curse of Aurore	2021	Mehran C. Torgoley	Cult Cinema Productions	
The Medium	2021	Banjong Pisanthanakun	GDH 559; Showbox	
Vazhiye	2021	Nirmal Baby Varghese	Casablanca Film Factory	
Untitled Horror Movie	2021	Nick Simon	Bronwyn Cornelius Productions; Spectrum Studios; Anarchy Post	
Behind the Sightings	2021	Tony H. Cadwell		
Fresh Hell	2021	Ryan Imhoff; Matt Neal	Purr Boy Productions	
V/H/S/94	2021	Jennifer Reeder; Chloe Okuno; Simon Barrett; Timo Tjahjanto; Ryan Prows	Radio Silence Productions; Bloody Disgusting Films; Shudder Original Films; Cinepocalypse Productions; Studio71; Raven Banner Entertainment	
Dwellers	2021	Drew Fortier	Ellefson Films	
Paranormal Activity: Next of Kin	2021	William Eubank	Paramount Players; Blumhouse Productions; Solana Films; Room 101, Inc.	
Dashcam	2021	Rob Savage	Blumhouse Productions	
Masking Threshold	2021	Johannes Grenzfurthner	Monochrom	
Human Hibachi 2: Feast in the Forest	2022	Mario Cerrito		
Incantation	2022	Kevin Ko		
The Outwaters	2022	Robbie Banfitch	5100 Films; Fathom Film Company	
LOLA	2022	Andrew Legge	Cowtown Pictures	
Out There Halloween Mega Tape	2022	Chris LaMartina	Midnight Crew Studios	
Everybody Dies by the End	2022	Ian Tripp; Ryan Schafer	Children of Celluoid	
Razzennest	2022	Johannes Grenzfurthner	Monochrom	
Deadstream	2022	Joseph Hunter	Winterspectre Entertainment; Cook Filmworks; Stonehaven Entertainment	
V/H/S/99	2022	Johannes Roberts; Vanessa & Joseph Winter; Maggie Levin; Tyler MacIntyre; Flying Lotus	Bloody Disgusting; Soapbox Films; Cinepocalypse Productions; Radio Silence Productions; Studio71; Shudder Original Films	
Human Hibachi: The Beginning	2023	Mario Cerrito		
Late Night with the Devil	2023	Colin Cairnes; Cameron Cairnes	Image Nation Abu Dhabi; VicScreen; AGC Studios; Cinetic Media; Good Fiend Films; Future Pictures; Spooky Pictures	
Blue Hour: The Disappearance of Nick Brandreth	2023	Dan Bowhers	Glass House Distribution	
Livescreamers	2023	Michelle Iannantuono	Octopunk Media	
V/H/S/85	2023	David Bruckner; Scott Derrickson; Gigi Saul Guerrero; Natasha Kermani; Mike P. Nelson	Bloody Disgusting; Cinepocalypse Productions; Radio Silence Productions; Studio71; Shudder Original Films	
Invoking Yell	2023	Patricio Valladares	Welcome Villain	
Hostile Dimensions	2023	Graham Hughes	Enlightened Monster	
Hell House LLC Origins: The Carmichael Manor	2023	Stephen Cognetti	Cognetti Films; Marylous' Boys	
Milk & Serial	2024	Curry Barker	That's a Bad Idea	
Footage	2024	Saiju Sreedharan	Bineesh Chandran; Saiju Sreedharan	
Strange Harvest	2024	Stuart Ortiz	Adorable Damage; Pathogen Pictures	
V/H/S/Beyond	2024	Jordan Downey; Christian Long; Justin Long; Justin Martinez; Virat Pal; Kate Siegel; Jay Cheel	Bloody Disgusting; Cinepocalypse Productions; Radio Silence Productions; Studio71; Shudder Original Films	
Hunting Matthew Nichols	2024	Markian Tarasiuk	Dropshock Pictures	
Strange Frequencies: Taiwan Killer Hospital	2024	Kerwin Go	Reality MM Studios; Creative Leaders Group 8	
Solvent	2024	Johannes Grenzfurthner	Monochrom	
Bodycam	2025	Brandon Christensen		
Found Footage: The Making of the Patterson Project	2025	Max Tzannes	Dirty Shot Clean; Radio Silence Productions	
Bloat	2025	Pablo Absento	Bazelevs Company; Flag; Overland Pictures; Pulsar Content; XYZ Films	
The Last Cabin	2025	Brendan Rudnicki	DBS Films Orlando	
Project MKHEXE	2025	Gerald Robert Waddell	Feathered Fish Films; XYZ Films	
House on Eden	2025	Kris Collins	Spooky AF	
Buffet Infinity	2025	Simon Glassman	Peterson Polaris	
V/H/S/Halloween	2025	Bryan M. Ferguson; Casper Kelly; Micheline Pitt-Norman & R.H. Norman; Alex Ross Perry; Paco Plaza; Anna Zlokovic	Bloody Disgusting; Radio Silence Productions; Shudder Original Films	
Dream Eater	2025	Jay Drakulic; Mallory Drumm; Alex Lee Williams	The Horror Section	
In Our Blood	2025	Pedro Kos	Liberty Films; Firefly Theater & Films; Aaron Kogan Productions; Revelations Entertainment	
Man Finds Tape	2025	Paul Gandersman; Peter Hall	Rustic Films; XYZ Films; Arcanum Pictures	
Human Hibachi 3: The Last Supper	2025	Mario Cerrito		
Strawstalker	2026	George Henry Horton	Dark Atlantic	
402 Haunted Korean Hospital	2026	Anggy Umbara	Pichouse Films; Umbara Brothers Films	
V/H/S/Mixtape	2026	Flying Lotus; Tobias Forge; Ernest Dickerson; RZA; David Moreau; Renee Zhan	Shudder Original Films; Bloody Disgusting; Cinepocalypse Productions; Image Nation Abu Dhabi; Spooky Pictures; Be Afraid Media; Studio71; Speed Demon Productions	
The Jesus Tapes		Rick Pamplin	Nemours Marketing	

=== TV series, made-for-TV specials and TV episodes ===
- Alien Abduction: Incident in Lake County (1998) – UPN aired a 60-minute version with more interviews
- Alien Autopsy: (Fact or Fiction?) (1995)
- Alternative 3 (1977)
- American Horror Story: Roanoke (2016) (FX series)
- Archive 81 (2022) (Netflix series)
- Clarence, episode: "Clarence the Movie" (2018) (Note: Though the episode was animated, it is done in the style of found footage.)
- Ed, Edd n Eddy, episode: "An Ed is Born". In this episode where Eddy decides to make a home movie of himself to show his brother how 'grown up' he has become by using Ed's video camera. (2002)
- Flag (2006) (anime)
- Ghostwatch (1992)
- Godzilla: The Series, episode: "S.C.A.L.E." (2000). Though animated, the episode has no background music and alternates between footage from various security cameras.
- Inside No. 9, episode: "Cold Comfort". A story about a call centre, told through the CCTV camera. (2018)
- Jeopardy (2002) (BBC series)
- Les Documents Interdits (1989)
- Lost Tapes (2008–2010) (series)
- Psych, in the episode Lassie Jerky (2013), partially filmed as found footage
- Sleep No More, the ninth episode of Doctor Who Series 9 (2015)
- Steven Universe, episode: "The Big Show" (2018)
- Succession: Main title theme (2018–2023) (HBO series)
- The Comeback (2005) (series)
- The Creep Tapes (2024–present) (Shudder series)
- The River (2012) (series)
- The Simpsons, episode: Treehouse of Horror XXIII (2012). The 2nd segment "Unnormal Activity" is a parody of the Paranormal Activity franchise.
- This House Has People in It (2016)
- Ultimate Spider-Man, episode: "Exclusive" (2012)
- Without Warning (1994)

=== Web series ===
- Backrooms (2022–present)
- Ben Drowned (2010–2012; 2020)
- Gemini Home Entertainment (2019–present)
- Local 58 (2015–present)
- The Mandela Catalogue (2021–present)
- Marble Hornets (2009–2014)
- The Monument Mythos (2020-2025)
- No Through Road (2009–2012)
- The Oldest View (2023–2024)
- Petscop (2017–2019)

== See also ==
- Analog horror
- Cinéma vérité
- Epistolary novel
- Fictional book
- Hoax
- Mockumentary
- Point-of-view cinema
- Pseudo-documentary
- Screenlife
