= Alien abduction (disambiguation) =

Alien abduction can refer to the purported abductions of human beings by non-human entities.

Alien Abduction or alien abduction may also refer to:

== Film ==
- Alien Abduction (2005 film), a 2005 science-fiction horror film produced by The Asylum
- Alien Abduction (2014 film), a 2014 science-fiction horror film by Matty Beckerman
- Alien Abduction: Incident in Lake County, a 1998 found-footage film by Dean Alioto
- "Alien Abductions" (Bullshit! episode), a 2003 episode of Penn & Teller: Bullshit!

== Other uses ==
- Alien Abduction, an alternate name for the roller coaster Gravitron
- Alien abduction insurance, an insurance policy issued against alien abduction
- Alien abduction entities, beings alleged to secretly abduct people

== See also ==
- UFO Abduction (film), a 1989 found footage/thriller film
