= Evidence (disambiguation) =

Evidence is anything presented as proof of an assertion.

Evidence may also refer to:

- Scientific evidence
- Evidence (law), which governs testimony and exhibits presented in a case

== Music ==
=== Artists ===
- Evidence (musician) (born 1976), a member of hip hop group Dilated Peoples
- The Evidence (band), a progressive-punk power-trio from Canada

=== Albums ===
- Evidence (Steve Lacy album), 1962
- Evidence (Mal Waldron album), 1988
- Evidence (Vincent Herring album), 1991
- Evidence (The Angels album), 1994
- Evidence, an album by Karmacoda, 2003
- Evidence (Prime Circle album), 2012

=== Songs ===
- "Evidence" (Faith No More song), 1995
- "Evidence" (Josh Baldwin song), 2020
- "Evidence" (Mia Wray song), 2022
- "Evidence", a song by Everlife from the 2004 album Everlife
- "Evidence", a song by Marilyn Manson from the 2007 album Eat Me, Drink Me
- "Evidence", a song by Tara MacLean from the 1995 album Silence
- "Evidence", a song by Thelonious Monk from the 1958 album Misterioso

=== Record label ===
- Evidence Music, a jazz record label

== TV and movies ==
- Evidence (1915 film), a silent film drama
- Evidence (1922 film), a silent film drama
- Evidence (1929 film), a sound film
- Evidence (1988 film), a Malayalam film
- Evidence (2012 film), a found-footage horror film
- Evidence (2013 film), a found-footage crime thriller
- The Evidence (TV series), 2006

== Games ==
- Evidence: The Last Ritual, a PC adventure game
- Evidence: The Last Report, a PC adventure game developed for Microïds and released 1997
- CSI: Hard Evidence, a 2007 computer game based on the CSI: Crime Scene Investigation television series

== Other uses ==
- Evidence (policy debate)
- "Evidence" (short story), 1946, by Isaac Asimov
- Evidence, an Enlightenment Foundation Libraries file manager

== See also ==
- Proof (truth)
- Cover-up or concealment of evidence
- Evidence-based medicine
- Evidence-based policy
- Evidence-based policing
- Evidence-based management
- Evidentialism, a philosophical theory of justification
- Evidentiality, a grammatical device in some languages
- Mathematical proof
- Self-evidence
- Dempster–Shafer theory of evidence
- Marginal likelihood, in Bayesian probability theory
- Greatest Hits: The Evidence, an album by Ice-T
