= Inner demons =

Inner demons is a phrase used to describe a person's inner struggles.

Inner demon or Inner demons may also refer to:

- Inner Demons, a 2014 American found-footage horror film
- Inner Demon (film), a 2014 Australian horror film
- Inner Demons (comics), henchmen of Marvel Comics villain Mister Negative
- Silver Surfer: Inner Demons, a 2019 collected edition of Silver Surfer comics
- D.A. Sebasstian & The Inner Demons, a side project by Kill Switch...Klick frontman D.A. Sebasstian

== See also ==
- Europe's Inner Demons, a 1975 non-fiction book by Norman Cohn
- Demon (disambiguation)
- Demon possession
