= Butterfly Kisses =

Butterfly Kisses may refer to:

- "Butterfly Kisses" (song), a 1997 country-pop song which has been recorded by Bob Carlisle, Jeff Carson, the Raybon Brothers, Westlife and Cliff Richard
- Butterfly Kisses (Shades of Grace), a 1997 album by Bob Carlisle
- Butterfly Kisses (Jeff Carson album), 1997
- Butterfly Kisses (2017 film), a British-Polish drama film
- Butterfly Kisses (2018 film), an American horror film

== See also ==
- Butterfly Kiss, a 1995 British film
- Suicide Notes and Butterfly Kisses, a 2002 album by American metalcore band Atreyu
