= Upper =

Upper may refer to:

- Shoe upper or vamp, the part of a shoe on the top of the foot
- Stimulant, drugs which induce temporary improvements in either mental or physical function or both
- Upper, the original film title for the 2013 found footage film The Upper Footage
- Dmitri Upper (born 1978), Kazakhstani ice hockey player
- Upper Channel, an Egyptian regional television channel

== See also ==
- Uppers (video game), a video game by Marvelous
