= Scary Stories =

Scary Stories may refer to:

- Scary Stories to Tell in the Dark, a series of three collections of short horror stories for children by Alvin Schwartz
- Scary Stories to Tell in the Dark (film), a 2019 supernatural horror film, based on the book series
- Scary Stories (documentary), a 2018 documentary film about the book series
- Scary Stories (Roff), a collection short stories by Don Roff
- Scary Stories: Dark Web, a 2020 supernatural horror anthology film
