= Paavola (surname) =

Paavola is a Finnish surname. Notable people with the surname include:

- Eliisa Paavola (born 1976), Finnish painter
- Matias Paavola (born 2000), Finnish footballer
- Pekka Paavola (1933–2023), Finnish politician
- Rodney Paavola (1939–1995), American ice hockey player
- Satu Paavola (born 1970), Finnish actress
- Tommi Paavola (born 1965), Finnish former footballer
