= M.O.M. Mothers of Monsters =

2020 found footage film by Tucia Lyman

- Official poster
- Directed by: Tucia Lyman
- Written by: Tucia Lyman
- Produced by: Austin Porter, Elaine White
- Starring: Melinda Page Hamilton; Bailey Edwards
- Cinematography: Matt Paulsen
- Music by: Salvatore Siciliano
- Production company: Aha Productions
- Distributed by: Indie Rights, Found TV
- Release date: 13 March 2020 (Arena Cinelounge Theater)
- Running time: 98 minutes
- Country: United States
- Language: English

M.O.M. Mothers of Monsters is a 2020 found footage psychological thriller and horror feature film directed and written by Tucia Lyman, about a mother who suspects her teenage son is plotting a school shooting.

Mothers of Monsters was named by Rotten Tomatoes one of the "Top 100 Best Found Footage Movies".

== Plot ==
The film follows Abbey Bell, a single mother who grows increasingly suspicious that her teenage son, Jacob, is exhibiting dangerous and psychopathic behavior. Convinced that he may be planning a violent attack, Abbey secretly sets up hidden cameras throughout their home to document his actions.

As Abbey records Jacob's disturbing behavior—such as his obsession with violent video games, manipulative tendencies, and collection of unsettling drawings—she becomes more paranoid. She shares her concerns through video diary entries, questioning whether she is an overprotective, paranoid mother or if Jacob is genuinely dangerous.

As the film progresses, Jacob becomes aware of his mother's surveillance and begins to psychologically torment her, blurring the lines between reality and paranoia. Their relationship descends into a chilling battle of wits, leading to a tense and unexpected climax.

== Main Cast ==
- Melinda Page Hamilton as Abbey Bell
- Bailey Edwards as Jacob Bell

== Production ==
Director Tucia Lyman shot the movie using numerous surveillance cameras mostly in one location (up to 6 in a single scene), carefully arranged by photography director Matt Paulsen.

Tucia's background in documentary television made her want to give the movie an unpolished documentary look that feels gritty and uncomfortably voyeuristic, so the audience would have a sense of peeking through a keyhole into the intimate life of someone else's dysfunctional family. After the actors finished their interpretation of a scene, Tucia Lyman would ask them to forget all their training and deliver their lines again as simply as possible, for the documentary-style, slice-of-life feel that she had envisioned.

Most of the film crew, including all the department heads, were female.

== Release ==
The movie premiered at the Arena Cinelounge Theater in Hollywood on March 13, 2020, and simultaneously online on streaming platforms.

It screened at On Vous Ment! Mockumentary Film Festival in France on May 7, 2022.

== Reception ==
=== Critical response ===
On Rotten Tomatoes the movie holds a 70% approval rating based on 10 reviews, with top critic Kristy Puchko calling it "a diamond in the rough" that "horror fans should seek out", and C.H. Newell appreciating "Tucia Lyman's focus on the ethical/social dilemmas in which mothers find themselves, specifically when raising boys growing up into dangerous young men."

== See also ==
- List of films featuring psychopaths and sociopaths
- Zero Day (2003) - found footage feature film about school shootings
