= The Final Project =

- Theatrical release poster
- Directed by: Taylor Ri'chard
- Written by: Taylor Ri'chard; Zach Davis
- Produced by: Taylor Ri'chard; Zach Davis
- Starring: Teal Haddock; Arin Jones; Leonardo Santaiti; Evan McLean; Sergio Suave; Amber Erwin
- Cinematography: Leonardo Santaiti
- Edited by: Richard Robinson
- Music by: Antoine Wilson; Paula Taylor
- Production company: 3rd Fathom Films
- Distributed by: Cavu Pictures
- Release dates: April 16, 2015 (Louisiana); February 12, 2016 (Limited release); March 4, 2016 (Wide)
- Running time: 80 minutes
- Country: United States
- Language: English

The Final Project is a 2015 American found footage horror film directed by Taylor Ri'chard. It stars Teal Haddock, Arin Jones, Leonardo Santaiti, Evan McLean, Sergio Suave, and Amber Erwin as student ghosthunters who fall prey to a vengeful spirit at a haunted Louisiana plantation. It premiered in April 2015 and received a theatrical release in February 2016.

== Plot ==
The film opens with an anonymous person who states that the footage is all that remains of six college students, Anna, Jonah, Genevieve "Gen", Gavin, Misty, and Ky. The six went to an abandoned plantation in rural Louisiana to shoot an extra credit assignment for film class, despite several warnings that it is haunted by dangerous spirits. Soon after they arrive Gen goes missing and an unseen presence kills everyone but Jonah and Anna. The two are temporarily locked in the basement, where they discover Ky's body. They flee the house and find Gavin's body just before seeing Gen, whose face contorts supernaturally. The two then run back into the plantation home, where they are stalked and killed by a possessed Gen. The film ends with the anonymous person asking people to come forward with any information and revealing themselves as Gen's sibling, warning that she is dangerous and that people should not approach her. The film then shows Gen being questioned by police. She denies any knowledge or memory of the murders, growing increasingly agitated until she is possessed by a spirit, who makes her attack the officers.

== Cast ==
- Teal Haddock as Anna Davenport
- Arin Jones as Genevieve Ri'chard
- Leonardo Santaiti as Jonah Girard
- Evan McLean as Ky Brooks
- Sergio Suave as Gavin Charles
- Amber Erwin as Misty Gilroy
- Robert McCarley as Professor McCarley
- Tiffany Ford as store clerk
- Benjie Anderson as caretaker
- Charles Orr as Charles

== Production ==
After becoming dissatisfied with his corporate job, Ri'chard left it to pursue filmmaking. The story, co-written by Ri'chard, was based on local stories about Chretien Point Plantation near Sunset, Louisiana. When casting the film, Ri'chard looked for inexperienced actors, as he wanted the film to seem realistic and true to the "found footage" genre. Shooting began in 2012, but not all of the sets were available until 2014. Principal photography lasted six weeks and took place in Atlanta, Georgia. Ri'chard said he wanted to build relationships in his new home, Atlanta, rather than shoot on location.

== Release ==
The film screened in a one-night engagement in Louisiana, Texas and Georgia on April 16, 2015. CAVU Pictures released it theatrically on February 12, 2016, in Atlanta and Houston. It will play nationally on March 4, 2016, starting in New York and Los Angeles.

== Reception ==
Dennis Harvey of Variety called The Final Project an amateurish knockoff of The Blair Witch Project. Matt Boiselle of Dread Central rated it 1.5/5 stars and wrote that the film is "as color-by-numbers as the day is long". However, Matiland McDonaugh of Film Journal International called it a "formulaic but atmospheric found-footage shocker" and wrote that the film "features strong performances across the board". Troy Anderson of Anderson Vision rated it 3.5/5 stars and wrote, "...there is a place at the table for The Final Project." Though he criticized the film's editing, Mark L. Miller of Ain't It Cool News wrote, "The environment the film is made in is really spooky." Following Films on their website wrote of The Final Project, "With enough jumps and shocks to satisfy the Fangoria crowd this film will find its audience."
