= Space Cases =

Canadian television series (1996–1997)

- Created by: Peter David; Bill Mumy
- Starring: Walter Emanuel Jones; Jewel Staite; Rebecca Herbst; Kristian Ayre; Rahi Azizi; Paige Christina; Anik Matern; Cary Lawrence; Paul Boretski
- Country of origin: Canada
- Original language: English
- No. of seasons: 2
- No. of episodes: 26

Production
- Executive producers: Micheline Charest; Ronald A. Weinberg; Ted Jessup
- Running time: 22 minutes
- Production companies: CINAR Films (Note: As SPACE CASES Productions Inc.); Nickelodeon Productions

Original release
- Network: Nickelodeon
- Release: March 2, 1996 – January 27, 1997

Space Cases is a Canadian science fiction television series that aired on Nickelodeon for two seasons. Created by Peter David and Bill Mumy, it premiered on March 2, 1996, and ended on January 27, 1997, with reruns until 1998. Space Cases aired for a time on Nickelodeon's Saturday night block of shows known as SNICK, and on Nickelodeon UK, with reruns on Family and TVOntario in Canada.

A Space Cases episode aired on TeenNick in the US as part of its The '90s Are All That block on the night of October 14, 2011, for the block's U Pick with Stick line-up, and again on December 27, 2011, for Party Like It's the '90s. Space Cases returned once again on the night of January 1, 2016, on TeenNick during the new The Splat programming block but has not aired since; the first four episodes of Season One were aired.

The show's premise revolves around a group of misfit students and two adults who are stranded far from home aboard an alien ship. Their attempts at journeying back see many dangerous adventures and controversies, with some occasionally more mature themes.

== Synopsis ==
In the first episode of the series, a small group of misfits are kept behind from a Space Academy field trip. Nearby, an odd bird-like alien ship appears, and Harlan Band decides to sneak onto it; the other students, all of whom are younger and much less troublesome, follow Harlan onto the ship. During their exploration of the ship's interior, the organic ship bonds to each student when each touches a bulkhead.

TJ Davenport, their teacher and principal, and Commander Seth Goddard go after them and, in a string of bad luck, become separated throughout the vessel. One of the students accidentally charges the engines, hurtling the ship off into a spatial rift. By the time everyone figures out that only the children who bonded to the ship can actually control it, the ship has stopped several light years away from the academy. They set off on a return trip which would take them at least seven years, four months, and twenty-two days at maximum speeds.

== Development ==
While writing the 1990 Star Trek: The Next Generation tie-in novel A Rock and a Hard Place, Peter David considered several titles for the book, including Space Case. Within the novel, the descriptor of "space case" was given to the aloof First Officer Quintin Stone.

In 1993, Nickelodeon approached David's manager, Susan Dietz, about creating a science fiction series for children. Dietz also represented actor Bill Mumy, and David and Mumy worked together to develop the program that ultimately became Space Cases. David recycled the name from his working title for A Rock and a Hard Place, although Nickelodeon initially thought that it sounded too juvenile. The two developers expanded the show's premise from Nickelodeon's idea of students at a space academy, as David "shuddered at the notion of a weekly show about an entire class of Wesley Crushers." Their idea was a group of academy students trying to get home aboard a mysterious ship, which David characterized as, in Hollywood terms, "kind of No Exit meets Summer School."

The series was shot in Montreal, Quebec. Due to budgetary constraints, props from Are You Afraid of the Dark? and other Nickelodeon programs were used in the series. In other episodes, more mundane props were used, as in the episode "Homeward Bound", the character Suzee is sitting in a chair with compact discs pasted to either side. During the first season, electronic games such as Lights Out were used as control panels on walls.

Season One's original theme song was an instrumental orchestral piece, with a voiceover giving a preamble. A vocal song telling the story of the Space Cases was used as the closing. For Season Two, this song was moved to the front and re-recorded to accommodate the removal of Catalina, the addition of Suzee, and some re-arranging to how the characters were presented. At some point after the series ended, Nickelodeon had the song re-recorded once more, using the same character arrangement as Season Two, but removing Suzee and adding Catalina back in, and created a new opening for the Season One episodes with this song.

The series features a multitude of celebrity guest stars throughout its run, including George Takei, Mark Hamill, Bill Mumy, Katey Sagal, Michelle Trachtenberg, Danny Tamberelli and Robin Leach.

== Characters ==
Main cast

- Walter Emanuel Jones as Harlan Band
- Jewel Staite as Catalina (season 1)
- Rahi Azizi as Bova
- Kristian Ayre as Radu
- Paige Christina as Rosie Ianni
- Anik Matern as THELMA (Techno Human EmuLating MAchine)
- Paul Boretski as Commander Seth Goddard
- Cary Lawrence as T.J. Davenport
- Rebecca Herbst as Suzee (season 2)

Recurring cast

- George Takei as Warlord Shank
- Katie Emme McIninch as Elmira

== Episodes ==
=== Pilot ===
Title	Original release date
"Breath of a Salesman"	Unaired
An alien salesman, Yee Haw Jones, boards the ship.

=== Season 1 (1996) ===
No. overall	No. in season	Title	Directed by	Written by	Original release date
1	1	"We Gotta Get out of This Place"	John Bell	Peter David & Bill Mumy	March 2, 1996
After learning their field test is suspended because they are not ready, the Space Cases try to prove themselves by making contact with the Christa, an alien ship outside Star Academy. While Commander Goddard and Miss Davenport look for them on the ship, the Christa is pulled through a spatial rip sending them all on a journey they learn will take over seven years to return home.
2	2	"Who Goes Where?"	John Bell	Peter David & Bill Mumy	March 9, 1996
After retrieving a teddy bear from space for Rosie, Radu starts to see Spung hallucinations. Rosie realizes the teddy bear is responsible for the hallucinations and with Thelma's help, she is able to make an antidote.
3	3	"A Day in the Life"	Otta Hanus	Peter David & Bill Mumy	March 16, 1996
The Christa becomes the target for a pair of territorial aliens. Guest Stars: Mark Hamill & Bill Mumy as Ferna Herna.
4	4	"Spung at Heart"	Otta Hanus	Peter David & Bill Mumy	March 23, 1996
After receiving a distress call, Radu and Harlan rescue a young Spung – a race that both humans and Andromedans distrust. As a reward the Spung reads their future, and the crew becomes frightened when her predictions begin coming true. Guest Stars: Katie Emme as Elmira & George Takei as Warlord Shank.
5	5	"Forever Young"	John Bell	Story by : Kristian Ayre; Teleplay by : Jerry Colker	March 30, 1996
Neinstein, an alien being, turns Miss Davenport and Commander Goddard into children. The kids celebrate not having any adults on board until Neinstein takes over the ship and their lives. The crew are forced to retake the ship or be on a trip to Neinstein's home world for the next 70 years.
6	6	"Nowhere Man"	Iain Paterson	Peter David & Bill Mumy	April 6, 1996
After complaining that he wants to be left alone, Harlan begins working in the engineering room where he finds a radiation leak and soon regrets it.
7	7	"Desperately Seeking Suzee"	John Bell	Peter David & Bill Mumy	April 13, 1996
Suzee leaves over an argument she has with Catalina. With Suzee gone, Catalina and Harlan send the Christa heading straight for a comet and Catalina hopes Suzee will come back in time to save them.
8	8	"It's My Birthday, Too (Yeah!)"	John Bell	Teleplay by : Peter David & Bill Mumy; Story by : Myra David	April 20, 1996
When Radu finds out it is Bova's birthday, he says it is also his birthday, but things do not go the way he planned.
9	9	"Tie Me Kangaroo Down, Court"	Otta Hanus	Jerry Colker	April 27, 1996
The crew gets sick of Harlan bossing people around; so they put him on trial for endangering them. Soon Radu looks carefully in the future video and discovers that everyone had a role in endangering the Christa after Harlan's departure. With the discovery made, can he convince Harlan and Catalina to cooperate with each other? Adding to the problems is that they have also entered a parallel universe where only Spung exist; which has unintended side effects.
10	10	"Prisoner of Luff"	Otta Hanus	Teleplay by : Magda Liolis; Story by : Ted Jessup and Peter David & Bill Mumy	May 4, 1996
A prisoner takes over the Christa to save a race from war. Harlan suspects her for what happened to Catalina and refuses to help until the prisoner retrieves her out of the prison she put her in.
11	11	"The Impossible Dram"	Otta Hanus	Peter David & Bill Mumy	May 18, 1996
A knight boards the Christa searching for a monster that may exist only in his imagination.
12	12	"Break on Through to the Other Side"	John Bell	Peter David & Bill Mumy	May 25, 1996
Bova is the only witness to an accident that seems to implicate Thelma as a traitor.
13	13	"On the Road to Find Out"	John Bell	Peter David & Bill Mumy	June 1, 1996
The crew discovers another vessel similar to the Christa that has just been through a war. However, Catalina suspects that the ship is part of Warlord Shank's plans. This proves correct and only she is able to rescue the Christa and crew to safety at the apparent cost of her life. As the crew mourn losing Catalina, her seemingly-invisible friend, Suzee, is shown in front of the crew.

=== Season 2 (1996–97) ===
No. overall	No. in season	Title	Directed by	Written by	Original release date
14	1	"New Places, New Faces"	Jeff Blyth	Peter David & Bill Mumy	October 12, 1996
Three Spung killcruisers drop out of hyperspace to attack the Christa. This forces the crew to crash land on a jungle planet, with atmospheric friction turning the Christa silver; THELMA and the interior also turn silver due to symbiosis. The Christa engines are now damaged, stranding the group until they can scavenge resources to rebuild and modify the ship.
15	2	"The Sporting Kind"	Vincenzo Natali	Evan Carlos Somers	October 19, 1996
Rosie finds a new pet, but Spung are hunting for it and are not happy about losing their prey.
16	3	"Long Distance Calls"	Stephen Williams	Peter David & Bill Mumy	October 26, 1996
The crew uses a powerful communications satellite to contact friends and relatives back home, but they are overheard by Reaver, a pirate who wants the satellite, and his old nemesis, Commander Goddard. Note Suzie is able to call Catalina back in her home dimension, where she has been taken in by Suzie's parents.
17	4	"King of the Hil"	David Straiton	Peter David & Bill Mumy	November 2, 1996
Harlan is captured by a tribal people known as The Hil, who believe prophecy is being fulfilled.
18	5	"Truth Hurts"	Stephen Williams (director)	Magda Liolis	November 9, 1996
Rosie cannot keep secrets and, as a result, places her trust with the crew in jeopardy.
19	6	"Homeward Bound"	Adam Weissman	Valri Bromfield	November 16, 1996
Radu receives a vision that Spung attack cruisers are coming to destroy the Christa, but he cannot convince anyone that what he knows was not just a dream.
20	7	"All You Can Eaty"	Jeff Blyth	Kevin Kopelow and Heath Seifert	November 23, 1996
The crew discovers a new pet, but do not realize the dangers of having it aboard the Christa. However, Suzie and Rosie sense something is off. Guest Stars: Danny Tamberelli as Male Prankster/Stuart, Michelle Trachtenberg as Female Prankster.
21	8	"Both Sides Now"	John Fawcett	Peter David & Bill Mumy	November 30, 1996
The crew wish they could exchange bodies with one another. Suzee wants to be an android, Radu wants to be human, and Harlan wants to be Andromedan. When the crew get their wish the Christa does not respond to the crew.
22	9	"Mother Knows Best"	David Straiton	Mindy Schneider	December 7, 1996
A strange energy force, known as Ma, gives the kids as well as the adults whatever they want. However, Radu is not fooled and suspects that Ma is after them. Meanwhile, the Christa's power is being drained while the other kids are being spoiled by Ma, and Thelma cannot convince them that they are in danger. It is up to Radu to convince the others they are in danger and that they must break Ma's spell over them to save the Christa. Guest Stars: Sheena Larkin as Ma, Katey Sagal as voice of Ma. Note: Major focus on Thelma during the first half of the show.
23	10	"A Star is Boring"	David Straiton	Patricia Marx	January 19, 1997
Bova is feeling left out of the crew, so he sends out a signal to space. He claims to have an immortality potion, and that he is living proof. When an interested alien buyer contacts him it is discovered he does not have a potion to sell. The alien kidnaps him and puts him on display as the "oldest living creature".
24	11	"Runaway"	Adam Weissman	Peter David & Bill Mumy	January 5, 1997
Radu and Bova are returning with fuel for the Christa. Suzee has made modifications to the Christa's engines, Harlan tries them out, and the Christa becomes a runaway ship on a collision course with Radu and Bova in the shuttle. Note End of the Stranded Arc
25	12	"Trouble with Doubles"	Jeff Blyth	Joshua Levin, Benjamin Zackheim	January 12, 1997
The crew fly by an old satellite where a Doppleganger, a creature of energy that creates evil twins of people, gets on board the ship. The evil twins begin to take over the ship.
26	13	"A Friend in Need"	Adam Weissman	Peter David & Bill Mumy	January 27, 1997
The Space Cases check out a space station that was recently attacked by Spung. Note Final episode, leaving the show unresolved; the crew hasn't gotten back to the school nor has Suzie switched back with Catalina.

== Legacy ==
Peter David's Star Trek: New Frontier novel series, which launched in 1997, contained a number of references to Space Cases. The opening book of the series, House of Cards, included a Commander Seth Goddard of Starfleet, as well as a Lieutenant Kristian Ayre serving on the bridge of the USS Enterprise. Further references in the series included the husband-and-wife characters Cary and Boretskee, named after Space Cases actors Cary Lawrence and Paul Boretski, as well as a Catalina City on the moon of Titan—on Space Cases, Titan was Cadet Catalina's homeworld. Most notably, the curse word "Grozit," often used by Catalina on Space Cases, was frequently uttered by New Frontier's main character Mackenzie Calhoun.

== See also ==
- Star Trek: Prodigy – an animated series set in the Star Trek universe which uses a similar premise.
