= The Last Cabin =

2025 horror film directed by Brendan Rudnicki

- Official release poster
- Directed by: Brendan Rudnicki
- Written by: Brendan Rudnicki; Kellan Rudnicki
- Produced by: Brendan Rudnicki
- Starring: Tatum Bates; Isabella Bobadilla; Kyree Cook
- Cinematography: Brendan Rudnicki
- Production company: DBS Films Orlando
- Release date: April 29, 2025
- Running time: 70 minutes
- Country: United States
- Language: English

The Last Cabin is a 2025 American found footage horror film directed, produced by Brendan Rudnicki and co-written by Brendan and Kellan Rudnicki. It stars Austin J. Rhodes, Benjamin L. Newmark, Brendan Goshay, Cashmere Monique, Daniel Wheeler, Isabella Bobadilla, Kyree Cook and Tatum Bates. The film is about a film crew finds themselves stalked by three masked men who know the isolated forest and their every move.

== Synopsis ==
A group of independent filmmakers – Hope, Ben, and Shawn travel to a secluded forest cabin to scout for a future horror project. Their quiet retreat quickly turns into a nightmare as they realize they're being watched. Soon, the crew is stalked by three strangers wearing clown masks who know the terrain better than their victims. As the group tries to escape, they discover their every move is anticipated, and their attempts at survival are captured on camera.

== Cast ==
- Isabella Bobadilla as Hope
- Brendan Goshay as Ben
- Tanner Kongdara as Shawn
- Tatum Bates
- Benjamin L. Newmark
- Kyree Cook
- Austin J. Rhodes
- Cashmere Monique
- Tagen Crossely
- Dylan DeVane
- Daniel Wheeler

== Production ==
The film was developed and produced by DBS Films, a studio known for low-budget, independently distributed horror productions. Filming took place in a remote wooded area near Orlando, Florida. The project employed a minimalist found-footage approach, emphasizing handheld cinematography, natural lighting, and improvised dialogue to evoke realism.

Director Brendan Rudnicki shared his vision for the film, stating:

“We set out to make horror feel real and unsettling. Isolated and exposed, you’re stalked by something relentless, every sound causing anxiety. The Last Cabin dives into that dirty, clawing fear, where surviving’s all you’ve got left”.

He also said that the film is inspired by Rec and V/H/S.

== Release ==
The Last Cabin was released via digital platforms including Amazon Prime Video, Apple TV, and Roku on April 29, 2025. It runs approximately 70 minutes. The film was not given a theatrical release and instead targeted horror audiences through streaming and social media-based marketing.

== Reception ==
Hannah Cronk of Film Threat gave the film a movie score of 7 out of 10 and she said; Is The Last Cabin a game changer? No. Is it a tight, effective, and well-acted horror outing that gives genre fans precisely what they came for, with a little more polish than expected? Absolutely.

Chris Catt of Creepy Catalog gave the film a rating of 2 stars out of 5 stars and wrote; I didn’t dislike The Last Cabin, but I would only recommend it for die-hard found footage fans. It doesn’t add much of anything new to the genre, but for a micro-budget film, there are positives within its execution.
