= Shopping Tour =

- Film poster
- Russian: Шопинг-тур
- Directed by: Michael Brashinsky
- Written by: Michael Brashinsky
- Produced by: Gennady Mirgorodsky; Michael Brashinsky
- Starring: Tatyana Kolganova; Timofey Eletskiy
- Cinematography: Aleksandr Simonov
- Edited by: Michael Brashinsky
- Production companies: 2020 Studio; Duty-Free Productions; Focus Plus Cinema
- Distributed by: Central Partnership
- Release date: 15 August 2012
- Running time: 70 min
- Country: Russia
- Languages: Russian, English, Finnish

Shopping Tour (Russian: Шопинг-тур) is a 2012 Russian found footage horror comedy film directed by Michael Brashinsky. The film is about a mother and her teenage son who go on a trip to Finland together with other tourists, but when they go to explore a newly opened electronics store, they are chased by Finnish cannibals. The film stars Tatyana Kolganova and Timofey Eletskiy.

The film premiered in Russia on 15 August 2012, but did not have a wider release in Russia until November 2013. In Finland, the film premiered at the Helsinki International Film Festival in September 2012 and with a wider theatrical release on 12 September 2014.

Despite the fact that Shopping Tour has received a mixed reception from critics, the film won several awards in the Russian film festivals.

== Cast ==
- Tatyana Kolganova as Mrs. Polansky
- Timofey Eletskiy as Stas Polansky
- Tatyana Ryabokon as guide
- Alexander Lutov as bus driver
- Elena Belskaya as shuttle trader
- Vladimir Nekrasov as Captain Tuivisto
- Veli-Pekka Teponoja as police #1
- Juhani Vainio as police #2
- Nanna Mäkinen as gas station worker
- Satu Paavola as blonde woman

== Reception ==
Kari Salminen from Turun Sanomat gave the film one star out of five, because even though he said the film is "a rough, experimental and sometimes clever horror flick", he specifies that "when the film's horror is mixed with comedy, the latter is not overemphasized, nor is the ugliness, which is why the viewer doesn't need so many nerves than the ability to tolerate the dreary aesthetics of penury."
