= Blue Hour: The Disappearance of Nick Brandreth =

- Poster
- Directed by: Dan Bowhers
- Written by: Dan Bowhers
- Produced by: Dan Bowhers; Nick Brandreth; Mike Headford
- Starring: Morgan DeTogne; Michael Kowalski; Mike Headford; Nick Brandreth; Josh Olkowski
- Cinematography: Nick Brandreth; Mike Headford
- Edited by: Mike Headford
- Distributed by: Glass House Distribution
- Release dates: April 19, 2023 (Panic Film Festival); August 1, 2023 (VOD)

Blue Hour: The Disappearance of Nick Brandreth is a 2023 American found footage horror drama film written and directed by Dan Bowhers. The film stars Morgan DeTogne, Michael Kowalski, Mike Headford, Nick Brandreth and Josh Olkowski.

== Plot ==
Two and a half decades after her father disappeared in 1997, a documentarian seeks the truth from her family and law enforcement.

== Cast ==
- Morgan DeTogne as Olivia Brandreth
- Michael Kowalski as Chris Donovan
- Mike Headford as Luke D'Antonio
- Nick Brandreth as Nick Brandreth
- Josh Olkowski as Captain Frank Lynch
- Michael Bauer as Greg Herston
- Donna Carpino as Francine Brandreth
- Jacqueline Hinton as Marisa Biondi
- Robert Husted as Henry Davenport
- Robert J. Jeffords as Horace Cody Taylor
- Connie Neer as Mary Anne Stoughton
- Gordon Rothman as News Subject
- Kathryn Schott as Taylor Glendal
- Natalie Sullivan as Alice Sayers
- Dan Titmuss as Stuart Wallace
- Katie Waterman as Miranda Tully
- Ryan Waterman as Dr. Frederick Hall
- Alaina Wis as News Reporter

== Production ==
Bowhers said the story is based around a real person named Nick Brandreth, who was never missing. Brandreth is a photographical historian and all the family photos in the film are real.

== Release ==
The film premiered at Panic Fest on April 19, 2023. It was released on August 1, 2023.

== Reception ==
Bobby LePire at Film Threat scored it 8 out of 10. Mary Beth McAndrews at Dread Central, Stephanie Malone at Morbidly Beautiful and Dani Shembeth at Slay Away all scored it 3 out of 5. Katelyn Nelson at Daily Grindhouse said the performances were stiff from time to time but it "has a lot to offer when it comes to originality and atmosphere." Louisa Moore at Screen Zealots found the film interesting but said the runtime was too long.
