= Aliens: Zone of Silence =

2017 film

- Directed by: Andy Fowler
- Written by: Andy Fowler; Fidel Arizmendi
- Starring: Sarah Hester; Peter Gesswein; Jed Maheu
- Cinematography: Justin Talley
- Edited by: Matthew Evanz; Felipe Fenton; Rick Perkins
- Music by: Rene Garza Aldape
- Distributed by: Gravitas Ventures; Netflix
- Release date: October 24, 2017
- Running time: 79 minutes
- Country: United States
- Language: English

Aliens: Zone of Silence is a 2017 American direct to video found footage science-fiction psychological horror film directed by Andy Fowler in his directorial debut, and co written by Fowler and Fidel Arizmendi.

== Premise ==
After Morgan's brother Hal vanishes from the Mexican desert, Morgan sets out to uncover the truth about his disappearance. When she discovers an extraterrestrial presence, she must risk her life to expose the desert's otherworldly secret.

== Release ==
In the United States and Canada, Aliens: Zone of Silence was released direct to video on October 24, 2017.

== Critical response ==
Footage Found Critic gave the film 9.5/10 stating it "elevates the found footage genre".
