= Kristian Ayre =

British actor

- Born: England
- Education: Simon Fraser University
- Occupation: Actor
- Years active: 1992–present

Kristian Ayre is a British actor, best known for his portrayal of the character Radu from the Nickelodeon children's science fiction show Space Cases.

== Early life ==
Kristian Ayre was born in England, and moved to Canada at a young age. He began acting in the early 1990s, and appeared in the 1994 movie Andre with Keith Carradine. After a couple of appearances in TV Movies, including Bye Bye Birdie (1995), he was cast (thanks in part to co-creator Peter David) in the Nickelodeon TV series Space Cases as Radu 386.

He attended Simon Fraser University in Vancouver, British Columbia, graduating in 2004 with a Bachelor of Fine Arts degree in Theatre. He is trained in acrobatics and gymnastics.

== Career ==
Ayre appeared in every episode of the David/Bill Mumy-created two-season Space Cases (1996–97), alongside co-stars Walter Emanuel Jones, Rahi Azizi, Paige Christina, Anik Matern, Cary Lawrence and Paul Boretski, which also featured early appearances from future-Firefly and Stargate: Atlantis actress Jewel Staite. Staite, as quoted by Peter David, described Ayre as:

one of the most memorable actors I've ever worked with, [whose] attention to detail in the process of fleshing out a character is inspiring. He is one of those actors who sincerely loves what he does, and it shows.

Ayre starred in the 1997 CBS TV series The New Ghostwriter Mysteries, and in a regular role on the 1999–2000 TV series Nothing Too Good for a Cowboy alongside future-Scrubs star Sarah Chalke. In the 1999 movie Running Home, Ayre co-starred with Babylon 5 actress Claudia Christian, who is quoted as describing him as "a very good actor and very easy to work with." Ayre also has appeared in odd episodes of such notable science fiction shows as The Outer Limits, Stargate SG-1 and The Dead Zone, among other TV appearances. Appearing as 'Loran' in "The Light" (Stargate SG-1 Season 4, episode 18), Ayre was required to cry, but eschewed the usual tricks of the trade, since he can "cry on cue."

Ayre has also lent his voice to a number of dubbed versions of Japanese anime series, including Elemental Gelade, as the main character of Coud Van Giruet and Shinichiro Isumi in Hikaru no Go, as well as Yuji Sakai in the first season of Shakugan no Shana. His vocal talents have also been featured in the 1993 video release of Kishin Corps: Alien Defender Geo-Armor (orig. title: Kishin Heidan) and in the English-language version of the 2004 fourth InuYasha movie InuYasha the Movie: Fire on the Mystic Island (orig. title: Inuyasha - Guren no houraijima).

In addition to credits on both the big and small screen, Ayre has also appeared in stage productions, including MovEnt's "Dances for a Small Stage" XII in January 2006, and with the Genus Theatre in Vancouver. Also in 2006, he performed in "War Lover for the Vancouver International Folk Festival," which he also produced through his "work with the Leaky Heaven Circus."

A Lieutenant Kristian Ayre appeared as a bridge officer on the Enterprise-E in Peter David's 1997 Star Trek: New Frontier debut novel, House of Cards.

In 1998, Ayre appeared as Tommy McPherson in the mock-documentary Alien Abduction: Incident in Lake County, which depicted a rural family as they were besieged by bizarre unexplained occurrences, before being abducted by extraterrestrials. The program caused a level of confusion and controversy upon its initial broadcast that echoed earlier reality-muddying incidents such as Orson Welles' War of the Worlds radio broadcast. Debate over the hoax nature of the program occurred on Internet chat rooms and bulletin boards, where the program's status as fiction was established by virtue of the fact that Tommy McPherson was played by Ayre, an actor.

== Personal life ==
Kristian Ayre is married.

== Partial filmography ==
Year	Movies/Television Shows	Role/s	Notes
1994	Andre	Gerald	
1994	Kishin Corps: Alien Defender Geo-Armor	Taishi Takamura	Anime, English dub
1995	Eye Level	Zack	Telefilm
1995	Bye Bye Birdie	Harvey Johnson	Telefilm
1996–1997	Space Cases	Radu	TV series
1997	The New Ghostwriter Mysteries	Henry 'Strick' Strickland	TV series
1998	Alien Abduction: Incident in Lake County	Tommy McPherson	Mockumentary
1999	Running Home	Matt 'Spider' Strilecki	
1999–2000	Nothing Too Good for a Cowboy	Tommy Aitkens	TV series
2000	Bear With Me	Daniel	
2001	Voyage of the Unicorn	Sebastian	Hallmark Entertainment Productions
2001	Stargate SG-1	Loran	TV series, Season 04 Ep. 18 "The Light
2002	Bang Bang You're Dead	Kurt	Telefilm
2003	Elf	Foom Foom	
2004–2005	Shakugan no Shana	Yūji Sakai	Anime, English dub, season 1
2004	Inuyasha the Movie: Fire on the Mystic Island	Ryūra	Anime, English dub
2005	Elemental Gelade	Coud 'Cou' Van Giruet	Anime, English dub
2008	Of Golf and God	Daniel	
