= Chretien Point Plantation =

Historic house in Louisiana, United States

- U.S. National Register of Historic Places
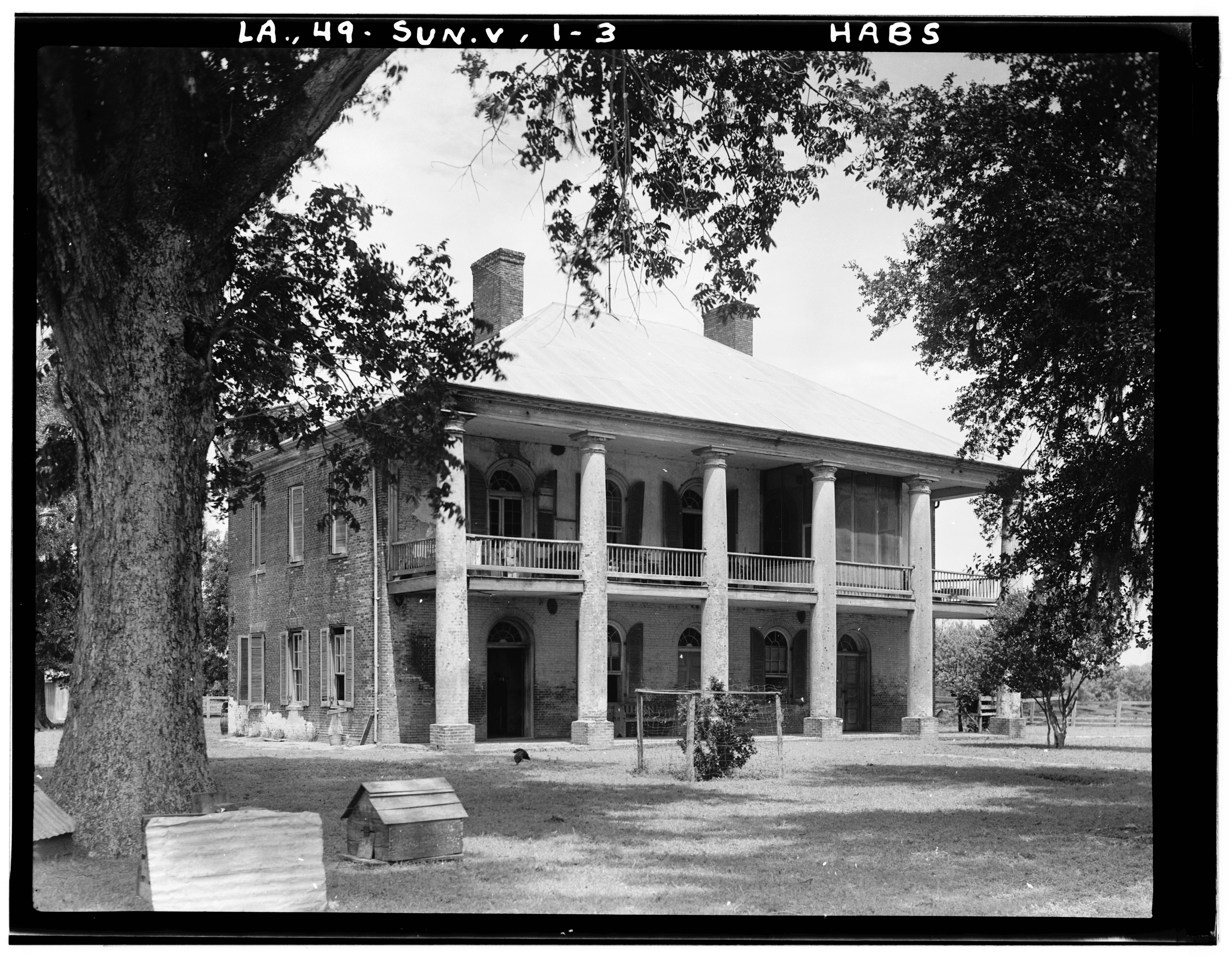

- Location within Louisiana Location within the United States
- Nearest city: Sunset, Louisiana
- Coordinates: 30°23′18″N 92°6′8″W
- Area: 20 acres (8.1 ha)
- Built: 1835
- Architectural style: Classical Revival
- NRHP reference No.: 77001519
- Added to NRHP: May 26, 1977

Chretien Point Plantation is a pre-Civil War twelve room red brick mansion, located on twenty acres on the banks of Bayou Bourbeaux, two miles southwest of Sunset, Louisiana in St. Landry Parish. A Civil War battle was fought on the plantation grounds and Jean Lafitte was a tenant. The mansion was listed on the National Register of Historic Places in 1977.

== Early history ==
The Spanish government made a land grant to Louis St. Germain in 1776. Joseph Chretien bought the property in 1781 and his grandson, Hipolyte Chretien II, inherited the land from his father. The plantation was a 3000-acre cotton farm worked by the forced labor of over 500 enslaved people. Hippolyte Chretien started construction on the mansion in 1831, and the two story big house was completed in 1835, when Chretien moved in with his wife Felicité. During the Civil War, Hypolite, in bed with fever, was alerted that the Union soldiers were coming to burn down the plantation. Several of his neighbors were already decimated. He had the servants help him to the balcony and waved a white flag to parlay with the Union Commander. It turns out that both Hypolite and the Union Commander were Masons. Because of this, the plantation home was spared and only the slave quarters and outbuildings were burned. At one point Jean Lafitte resided on the plantation. Hypolite II died of yellow fever in 1839 and his wife took over the plantation increasing the land holdings to a reported 10,000 acres. Felicité used to host poker games with Jean Lafitte and he taught her how to smoke cigars. There is a story of Felicité hearing a break-in occur one night after she had retired. She armed herself and stood on the stairway. As she saw movement, she fired, and shot the intruder in the head, almost decapitating him.

== Civil War ==
There were two battles fought near and around the plantation.

=== Battle of Buzzard's Prairie ===
The plantation grounds was the site of the Battle of Buzzard's Prairie, October 15, 1863. A part of General Nathaniel P. Banks' Army of the Gulf, led by Maj. General William B. Franklin, was on an expedition across Louisiana as part of the invasion of Texas that included Brig. Gen. Stephen Burbridge's 4th Division, 13th Corps, Brig. General Godfrey Weitzel's 1st Division, 19th Corps, and Brig. General Cuvier Grover's 3rd Division, 19th Corps.

The Confederate force was led by Brig. General Thomas Green's Cavalry Division that included the 1st Cavalry Brigade of Col. Arthur P. Bagby, the 4th (Col. William Polk "Gotch" Hardeman), 5th and 7th Texas Cavalry regiments; the 2nd Cavalry Regiment (Arizona brigade); the 13th Texas "Horse" Battalion; the 2nd Louisiana Cavalry and the Valverde Battery. Also in the division was the 2nd Cavalry Brigade of Col. John P. Major, made up of the 1st Regiment (Lane's) Partisan Rangers; 3rd Regiment (Arizona brigade) Partisan Rangers; 6th Regiment (Stone's) Partisan Rangers; and Captain Oliver Semmes' 1st Confederate Battery.

The battle was fought in the fields in front of the mansion. After an initial advance by the Union side the 4th, 5th, and 7th Texas Cavalry attacked the right side. Weitzel's line collapsed but was reinforced by Lt. William Marland and the Confederates were pushed back and driven off.

=== Battle of Bayou Bourbeux ===
The Battle of Bayou Bourbeux was fought on November 3–4, 1863. Also known as Battle of Grand Coteau or Battle of Carrion Crow Bayou.

The plantation was purchased by Kristine Nations, incorporated as Chretien Point Plantation, LLC, and operated as a bed and breakfast and wedding site.

== Folklore ==
Legends and ghost stories are common about the plantation. The 2015 horror film The Final Project was based on local folklore about Chretien Point.

== See also ==
- List of plantations in Louisiana
- National Register of Historic Places listings in St. Landry Parish, Louisiana
