= Death of a Ghost Hunter =

- Directed by: Sean Tretta
- Written by: Mike Marsh; Sean Tretta
- Produced by: Mike Marsh; Sean Tretta
- Starring: Davina Joy; Lindsay Page; Patti Tindall
- Cinematography: Sean Tretta
- Edited by: Sean Tretta
- Music by: Mike Marsh
- Production company: Ominous Productions
- Distributed by: Maxim Media International
- Release date: 2007
- Running time: 107 minutes
- Country: United States
- Language: English

Death of a Ghost Hunter is a 2007 horror/suspense film, directed by Sean Tretta.

== Plot ==
Ghost hunter Carter Simms is offered $5,000 to stay a weekend in the Masterson house to investigate paranormal activity. The owner of the house also hires Colin Green as the videographer and Yvette Sandoval as a journalist. Together they set up equipment and begin searching for evidence of ghosts or paranormal activity.

The group is then joined by Mary Young Mortensen, a young member of the Mastersons' church. She claims she was also sent by owner of the house to assist in the investigation. She also states that she is there to protect the reputations of the Mastersons because they were great members of their church.

The group stays in the Masterson house for three days. Several mysterious things happen: The room temperature in the master bedroom lowers dramatically in a short period; a chair moves on its own; a gunshot and mysterious voices are recorded and some ghostly figures are recorded on video.

By the beginning of day three, Colin gets a call from the owner of the house and it turns out Mary Young Mortensen was never supposed to be at the house; so Carter forces Mary to leave.

Later that night, nothing much is happening, but the group reviews a video tape and sees a figure in the guest house. As they are going to investigate the guest house, we flash to a scene where Mary is on a radio talk show concerned about the people out to discredit the good name of the Mastersons. She convinces herself she needs to stop them and returns to the house.

Mary then begins killing all members of the group, writes a note, and commits suicide much like the mother did in the opening scenes of the movie.

It turns out Mary was the small child left by the mother in the opening scene. She was rescued before she drowned and apparently adopted by the first officer to arrive on the scene. As Mary is preparing for her suicide, she tells the sordid story of the Mastersons, involving the imprisonment, rape and torture of her mother who eventually became pregnant with her. The birth of Mary caused Mrs. Masterson to kill her family and Mary's mother.

As the movie ends, it switches to a scene where Carter is seen looking at and into an infrared camera. She is now a ghost in the house, unable to leave along with the other ghosts.

== Cast ==
- Davina Joy as Yvette Sandoval
- Mike Marsh as Colin Green
- William McMinn as Peter Masterson
- Lindsay Page as Mary Young Mortenson
- Patti Tindall as Carter Simms

== Reception ==
The low-budget film received mixed reviews. It was praised for being genuinely scary, while others criticised the poor acting.

== See also ==
- List of ghost films
