= Satu Paavola =

Finnish actress (born 1970)

- Born: 17 August 1970 (age 55); Nurmo, Finland

Satu Paavola (born 17 August 1970) is a Finnish actress. She has also maintained a puppetry.

Paavola graduated with a master's degree in theater arts in 1999 and a theater expression director in 2007.

== Filmography ==
- Restless (2000) as woman in bar
- Upswing (2003) as Sanna
- Shopping Tour (2012) as blonde woman

== Television ==
- Kotikatu (1999) as doctor
- Salatut elämät (2010) as Minttu Erkkilä
- Bordertown (2016) as Veera Niemi
