= Karmacoda =

- Origin: San Francisco, California, United States
- Genres: Trip hop
- Years active: 2000–present
- Label: Sola Musa Music
- Members: Jessica Ford; B. Eric Matsuno
- Past members: Heather Pierce; Bruce Fulford; Rafael Acevedo; Brian Templeton

Karmacoda are an American trip hop group based in San Francisco, CA. The group currently includes singer Jessica Ford, singer/guitarist B., and bassist Eric Matsuno.

== History ==
Karmacoda was formed in 2000 by singer/guitarist B. (Brett Crockett) and singer Heather Pierce, who shared an interest in trip hop and drum and bass. Their group name was inspired by the song "Karmacoma" by Massive Attack. Drummer Bruce Fulford and bassist Brian Templeton completed the lineup. The group released their debut album Reco Mended in 2001, before they had performed live. On this album B. and Pierce shared lead vocals, but Pierce would become the dominant singer on later albums. Fulford then left the group; instead of finding a new drummer the group added Rafael Acevedo as a DJ.

The song "Swan" won the award for Best Film/TV Song at the third annual Independent Music Awards in early 2004. The group's second album Evidence was released later in 2004, and displayed influences from soul music. Bassist Brian Templeton then departed and was replaced by Eric Matsuno. The group's third studio album Illuminate was released in 2007. Eternal was released in 2011.

Heather Pierce left the group in 2012 to focus on her teaching career. Rafael Acevedo also left around this time, paring the group down to just B. and Eric Matsuno. For the group's 2015 album Love and Fate, Volume 1, several different female singers were recruited to perform duets with B. Guest vocalists included Beth Hirsch ("All for Love," "We Don't Have a Lot of Time," and "Message"), Shannon Hurley ("Charm" and "Shine Through"), Anji Bee ("Naive"), Artemis Robison ("Your Eyes (Hypnotized)"), and Tyler Stone ("Hungry for the Day").[11]12 Jessica Ford then joined the group as the permanent lead singer; the album Intimate was released in 2018.[7]

Ford remains the lead vocalist, and the group has since released two more studio albums: Slow Down, Melt and Catch Fire (2021) and Lessons in Time (2022).[13] Their album You And I followed in 2024.[14] In 2025, Karmacoda released the single, "Practically Impossible to Please," featuring San Franciscan vocalist, Megan Slankard of The Wreckage.

== Discography ==
- Reco Mended (2001)
- Evidence (2003)
- Altered Evidence: Late Night Remixes (2004)
- Illuminate (2007)
- Lux Life: Illuminated Remixes (2008)
- Ultraviolet Live (2009)
- Eternal (2011)
- Love Will Turn Your Head Around (The Remixes) (2013)
- Endless: The Eternal Remixes (2013)
- Love and Fate, Volume 1 (2015)
- Intimate (2018)
- Revealed (Intimate Remixes) (2019)
- The Intimate Remixes by E39 (2019)
- Slow Down, Melt and Catch Fire (2021)
- Lessons in Time (2022)
- You And I (2024)
