= Scary Stories: Dark Web =

2020 Horror Film

Scary Stories: Dark Web is a 2020 supernatural horror anthology directed by Bryan Renaud and produced by Random Acts, written by Renaud with additional material by Savanna Rae and Crystal Skillman. Originally developed as a live performance, the production was reimagined as a film, beginning production March 6, 2020, before the similar pandemic-era film Host. The film is notable in that it serves as an anthology with unconnected shorts, described in the plot as being found on the dark web. The story follows a group of friends (Savanna Rae, Bryan Renaud, Shannon Leigh Webber, Sarah Patin, Ben F. Locke, and Alexandra Alontaga) who unleash a long-dormant demon when stumbling into the dark web. In addition to the Zoom call, found footage formats used in the film include phone video, documentary footage, and live streaming.

The film premiered on demand on October 8, 2020, originally for a limited four-week run. After becoming the best-selling production in Random Acts' history, it was extended through November 2020 before eventually streaming on YouTube. In late 2020, the film was dubbed in Portuguese and released in Brazilian cinemas by Fox.

== Plot ==
After finding a mysterious book of stories in her attic, college student Chloe Whitaker (Savanna Rae) gathers her friends for a video call to reignite an ancient storytelling tradition called "The Moonlight Order." She tells the story of Sara Bogan, now remembered as The Boogeywoman, who lived a tortured life and found solace sharing stories. Chloe includes footage located on the dark web, unwittingly unleashing a dark force upon the call that targets the friend group one by one...but could it be Sara Bogan herself? After Jenny (Shannon Leigh Webber) and Alyssa (Alexandra Alontaga) disappear from the call, Michael (Bryan Renaud) heads on foot to Chloe's house.

Found footage segments are interspersed with the main plot and include a queer Tinder date gone wrong ("Date from Hell"), a haunted bridge ("Emily's Bridge"), a woman followed by herself ("Selfy"), and documentary footage ("The Pittsford Haunted House"). "Emily's Bridge" and "The Pittsford Haunted House" were previously featured in an anthology entitled Dead Static.

As Michael runs through the city, the dark force overtakes the call and reveals footage of Chloe participating in a ritual, becoming possessed. As the friends (Sarah Patin and Ben F. Locke) attempt to stop him, Michael arrives at Chloe's house where he finds hundreds of candles set up for a ceremony, but Chloe is nowhere to be found. We see that the ritual required a ceremony of six, only completed with a human sacrifice. Finally, we see Michael enter Chloe's screen on the call before he is attacked by Chloe, possessed by Sara Bogan.

Chloe calmly collects "The Moonlight Order" book and walks towards the camera as the call runs out of time. Despite similarities with Host (2020), the film is based on the 2019 theatrical play Scary Stories: Are You Afraid?, and entered production before Host (2020) premiered.

== Cast ==
- Savanna Rae as Chloe Whitaker
- Bryan Renaud as Michael
- Shannon Leigh Webber as Jenny
- Sarah Patin as Sheena
- Alexandra Alontaga as Alyssa
- Ben F. Locke as Jay
- Tony Todd as himself (Uncredited)
- Colton Adams as Kev
- Gardy Gilbert as Tuv
- Dana Macel as Girl

== Production ==
In 2016, Random Acts began developing a stage comedy inspired by Are You Afraid of the Dark?. In early 2019, Savanna Rae joined the production and assisted with a rewrite that changed the overall tone to more straight horror with comedic elements. A live production entitled Scary Stories: Are You Afraid? played a sold-out run at Otherworld Theatre in Chicago throughout October and November 2019.

Faced with canceling almost all events planned for 2020, Renaud and Rae (along with writer Crystal Skillman) re-adapted the story to be set in the present day, during the pandemic. After a private screening in September 2020, the writers quickly devised a new scene to connect the majority of the film to the final moments, completing reshoots only days before the premiere.

Exal Iraheta, who wrote the "Date from Hell" segment, spoke with Chicago Reader about writing for pandemic-era project and telling scary stories online. He states, "My story is about trying to meet someone online. I think it speaks to loneliness we’re all experiencing in quarantine...There’s like this hovering need to connect, you’re left asking so much sometimes: Who are we really meeting and talking to on the other side of that screen?" Iraheta had previously written a segment for the 2019 production as well.

Chicago Tribune announced the official cast on September 26, 2020.

== Release ==
Scary Stories: Dark Web became available as a 24-hour rental on October 8, 2020. Originally a limited event set to close on Halloween, the film broke all previous records for Random Acts, prompting an extension through November 2020.

In late 2020, the film was dubbed in Portuguese and given new captions before being released in Brazil and Argentina.

=== Home media ===
In July 2021, the film was posted in its entirety on YouTube.

In October 2021, stories featured in the film were adapted for the Scary Stories Around the Fire podcast.

On May 27, 2022, Random Acts posted a teaser trailer for VIRAL: a scary story with a planned Halloween release.

== Reception ==
FullTV's review states the film "had a stellar group of actors under the direction of Bryan Renaud...[it] manages to tell a very good story and keep the audience in their chair."

Fred's Horror Corner gave the film 3.5/5 stars, calling it a "believable mix of Host and VHS."

Chicago Reader recommended Scary Stories: Dark Web, stating it will "send the good kind of creepy shiver down your spine."
