= UFO Abduction (film) =

The McPherson Tape (a.k.a. UFO Abduction)
- Blu-ray artwork
- Directed by: Dean Alioto
- Written by: Dean Alioto
- Produced by: Dean Alioto
- Starring: Tommy Giavocchini; Patrick Kelley; Shirly McCalla; Stacey Shulman; Christine Staples; Laura Tomas; Dean Alioto
- Distributed by: Axiom Films
- Release date: 1989
- Running time: 66 minutes
- Country: United States
- Language: English
- Budget: $6,500

UFO Abduction (aka The McPherson Tape) is a 1989 American found-footage science fiction Horror film written, produced, and directed by Dean Alioto. The film centers on a family who are terrorized by extraterrestrials during a birthday celebration.

== Title misconception ==
Originally conceived as UFO Abduction by Dean Alioto, the film is now more commonly recognized as The McPherson Tape.

== Plot ==
The film begins with a brief introduction that purports the film as legitimate and explains that it is one of the strongest pieces of evidence for extraterrestrial life.

On the evening of October 8, 1983, the Van Heese family gathers in the Connecticut mountains to celebrate the birthday of 5-year-old Michelle. The family consists of Ma Van Heese (Shirly McCalla), her three sons Eric (Tommy Giavocchini), Jason (Patrick Kelley), and Michael (Dean Alioto), Eric's wife Jamie (Christine Staples), his daughter Michelle (Laura Tomas), and Jason's girlfriend Renee (Stacey Shulman). Michael uses his hand-held camera to record the night's events, much to the amusement and irritation of his family.

The early evening passes relatively uneventfully as the family celebrates; however, after briefly turning off the lights for Michelle's birthday candles, they discover that they will not turn back on. Eric, Jason, and Michael inspect the breaker outside, and are startled by a red light that passes overhead. Curious, they walk to the neighboring property to investigate. While walking, they reveal through their discussion that their mother has become an alcoholic since their father's death, despite their attempts to help her.

The three eventually come across what appears to be an extraterrestrial spacecraft in the woods, and are shocked to see three diminutive aliens standing outside. However, they flee after the aliens notice their lights. Returning to the house, they alert their family, lock the doors, and load shotguns, but are divided on whether they should remain in the house or leave. They see more red lights through a window, and theorize that the aliens may have left. After calming down, they attempt to continue the party, noticing that all their watches have stopped.

With the evening getting late, they conclude the festivities, and Eric and his family attempt to leave. Soon after, Jason and Michael come across one of Michelle's drawings, which resembles one of the aliens they saw in the woods. They rush Eric and his family back inside, and are terrified when the aliens attempt to enter the house through the windows and chimney. Eric manages to shoot and seemingly kill one after hearing it on the roof, which appears to dissuade the aliens from further attempts. He brings the alien's body inside and places it in a back room, despite the others’ protests.

After debating, Eric and Jason plan to retrieve Eric's truck and bring it by the front door so the family can escape. They do not return, so the others go after them but only find the empty truck and their shotguns. They flee back to the house, dragging a hysterical Jamie. Inside, they come to the hopeful conclusion that Eric and Jason must have gone for help, and attempt to occupy themselves by playing cards. Soon after, they narrowly prevent Renee and Ma from opening the front door in separate attempts. Both have no memory of the incident and claim they heard a voice in their head telling them to open the door. Michael also discovers the alien's body is gone and the back door is open. After securing the house once more and turning up the radio to block out voices, the others finally convince Michael to put down his camera and resume their card game. From its position across the room, the still-recording camera violently glitches and records the three aliens emerging from the back room. The tape ends as the aliens close in on the unaware family.

The film claims that the Van Heeses’ whereabouts are still unknown and that viewers should contact the producers if they have any information.

== Cast ==
The Van Heese family and aliens:

- Tommy Giavocchini as Eric Van Heese
- Patrick Kelley as Jason Van Heese
- Shirly McCalla as Ma Van Heese
- Stacey Shulman as Renee Reynolds
- Christine Staples as Jamie Van Heese
- Laura Tomas as Michelle Van Heese (the birthday girl)
- Dean Alioto as Michael Van Heese (cinematographer)
- Ginny Kleker as Alien 1
- Kay Parten as Alien 2
- Rose Schneider as Alien 3

== Production ==
UFO Abduction was written, directed, filmed, and produced by Dean Alioto, through IndieSyndicate Productions. The film is presented as found footage, portraying the final recordings and last known whereabouts of a Connecticut family named the Van Heeses just before they are abducted by extraterrestrials. Dean Alioto produced the no budget film using $6,500 from the company IndieSyndicate Productions.

== Release, reception and legacy ==
UFO Abduction had a limited release through Axiom Films. Designed to appear to be a genuine 1983 home video recording, the film depicts the alien abduction of a Connecticut family as they celebrate their relative's 5th birthday. The materials for UFO Abduction were destroyed in a warehouse fire at the distribution company, precluding the film's wide-release on video.

Prior to the remake a decade later, common criticism of the original film included sound quality, visual effects and low standard aesthetics.

In 2018, the film was first officially released to DVD and Digital download through the director. It was re-released in 2020 by AGFA on Blu-ray with a new upscaled transfer of the original, presumed lost, 3/4" tape. The release also includes the 2017 director's cut of the film, as well as a commentary track by the director.

== Remake ==
Dean Alioto and Paul Chitlik remade UFO Abduction in 1998, with a much larger budget and professional actors, under the original title The McPherson Tape which was changed by the network executives to Alien Abduction: Incident in Lake County.

== See also ==
- Kelly–Hopkinsville encounter
- UFO conspiracy theories
