= Inner Demon (film) =

- Directed by: Ursula Dabrowsky
- Written by: Ursula Dabrowsky
- Produced by: Sue Brown
- Starring: Sarah Jeavons; Kerry Ann Reid; Andreas Sobik
- Cinematography: Nima Nabili Rad
- Edited by: Cleland Jones
- Music by: Michael Taylor
- Release dates: 20 November 2014 (A Night of Horror International Film Festival); 21 April 2017 (US)
- Running time: 84 minutes
- Country: Australia
- Language: English

Inner Demon is a 2014 Australian horror film directed by Ursula Dabrowsky, starring Sarah Jeavons, Kerry Ann Reid and Andreas Sobik.

== Cast ==
- Sarah Jeavons as Sam Durelle
- Kerry Ann Reid as Denise
- Andreas Sobik as Karl
- Scarlett Hocking
- Todd Telford as Wayne

== Release ==
The film was released on various digital platforms on 21 April 2017.

== Reception ==
John Skipp of Fangoria wrote that while the performances of Jeavons and Reid are "truly outstanding", Sobik "dominates every single moment he’s in (and infects every moment he’s not), with an almost Klaus Kinski level of mesmerizing, blowtorching psychosis behind his glowering, drug-addled calm and command."

Howard Gorman of Scream rated the film 3 stars out of 5 and called it a "compelling and relevant film, providing audiences with much more to mull over than your average genre flick."

Film critic Kim Newman wrote that while the film "gets into a rut (or stuck in a cupboard) in that it seems to be recycling riffs in its menaced-by-a-maniac, trapped-in-a-confined-space and ghosts-on-the-loose phases", Jeavons' performance is "good" and her character an "unusually likeable screen teen", the dynamic between characters Denise and Karl "interesting" and it has a "couple of decent shocks and reversals."

Joel Harley of Starburst rated the film 5 stars out of 10 and wrote that "In spite of its accomplished lead performance and impressively oppressive atmosphere, this one is just a bit too introverted."
