= Fresh Hell (film) =

American horror film

- Directed by: Ryan Imhoff; Matt Neal
- Written by: Ryan Imhoff
- Produced by: Caitlin Conklin; Ryan Imhoff; Christine Vrem-Ydstie
- Starring: Lanise Antoine Shelley; Will Mobley; Ryan Imhoff
- Cinematography: Brian Wiebe
- Edited by: Matt Neal
- Music by: Will Mobley
- Production company: Purr Boy Productions
- Distributed by: DeskPop Entertainment
- Release date: September 11, 2021 (HorrorHound Film Festival)
- Running time: 79 minutes
- Country: United States
- Language: English

Fresh Hell is 2021 American horror comedy film directed by Ryan Imhoff and Matt Neal.

== Synopsis ==
During the dog days of the pandemic, a group of old friends encounter a psychotic troll in this horror comedy film.

== Production ==
The film was conceived and shot by a group of Chicago theatre artists who were out of work due to the COVID-19 pandemic. In an interview with Rue-Morgue, writer-director Ryan Imhoff stated the idea for the film was born in July 2020.

== Release ==
The film premiered on September 11, 2021 at HorrorHound Film Festival where it won Best Feature Film. The movie later played at the Music Box Theatre and was released on DVD and streaming platforms on June 10, 2022.

== Reception ==
On the review aggregator website Rotten Tomatoes, the film has an approval rating of 64%, with an average score of 3.3/5. Tori Danielle of PopHorror wrote: "Fresh Hell delivers horror comedy perfection."
