= Taylor Ri'chard =

American film director (born 1980)

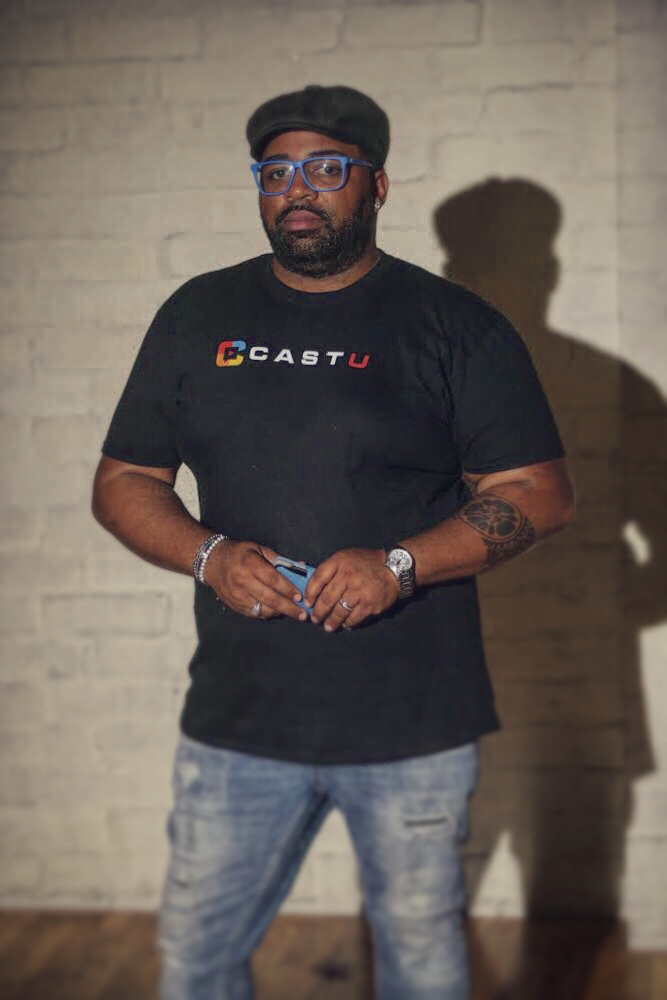
- Ri'chard in 2019
- Born: February 17, 1980 (age 46); Church Point, Louisiana, U.S.
- Occupations: Executive Producer; Film Director; Screenwriter; Actor
- Years active: 2001–present
- Website: 3rdfathom.com

Taylor Ri’chard (born February 17, 1980) is an American film director, screenwriter, executive producer, and actor.

== Early life ==
Ri’chard was born in Church Point, Louisiana, the son of Shirley Richard and Robert Taylor. He graduated from Dillard University in New Orleans, Louisiana, with a bachelor's degree in Mass Communications focused in radio, television, and motion picture. While attending graduate school at American InterContinental University, Ri'chard worked on several projects including a string of short films and web series. As a student at Dillard University, Ri’chard served as an intern on the documentary Murder on a Sunday Morning that went on to win an Academy Award.

== Career ==
In 2001, Ri’chard worked as a production assistant/intern on the Academy Award-winning HBO documentary Murder on a Sunday Morning. Ri’chard then moved his love for film and TV to Atlanta, GA where he hoped to participate in the booming film community there. Unfortunately he would become a part of the corporate world for quite a few years pushing his dreams of film to the background. Unsatisfied with his desk job, he started directing sketch comedy spoofs, and in 2009, Comcast Communications bought the rights to Ri’chard's sketch of Beyoncé’s “Single Ladies”. The media giant placed the sketch on its on-demand parody channel in which it garnered a #1 rating.

In 2011, Ri'chard left the corporate world and co-founded 3rd Fathom Entertainment with business partner Zach Davis and wrote the screenplay for The Final Project. After 4 years of dedication to making the screenplay a reality, the duo released The Final Project on April 16, 2015, to the public for a limited engagement of one-night only viewings in multiple cities. This caught the attention of independent New York-based film distribution company, CAVU Pictures, and on February 12, 2016 CAVU released the film theatrically in Georgia and Texas, rolling out to a national release beginning on March 4, 2016 in New York and Los Angeles, with more cities that followed.

The Final Project was the first feature film and directorial debut from Ri’chard. It also made Taylor Ri'chard one of the only African-Americans to both direct and write a horror film that was theatrically released, the last was Ernest Dickerson with Bones (2001).

Ri'chard second feature film, "Hallowed Be Thy Name", was released in 2020.

== Filmography ==
- The Final Project (2016)
- Hallowed Be Thy Name (2020)
