= Inner Demons =

- Directed by: Seth Grossman
- Written by: Glenn Gers
- Starring: Lara Vosburgh; Morgan McClellan; Kate Whitney
- Cinematography: Chapin Hall
- Edited by: Jeff Seibenick
- Music by: Adam Balazs
- Production company: Schorr Pictures
- Distributed by: IFC Midnight
- Release date: June 14, 2014 (Los Angeles Film Festival)
- Running time: 85 minutes
- Country: United States
- Language: English

Inner Demons is a 2014 found footage horror film that was directed by Seth Grossman. The movie had its world premiere on 13 June 2014 at the Los Angeles Film Festival and stars Lara Vosburgh as a teenage drug addict whose problems may be a result of demonic possession.

== Plot ==
Carson Morris (Lara Vosburgh) is a former straight-A student who has been using drugs for the past year, having begun shortly after she enrolled in a prestigious Catholic high school. She has agreed, albeit reluctantly, to allow a film crew to monitor her for an Intervention-esque documentary show as she checks into a rehab clinic. Carson is quickly made a target of ridicule by the other patients, as she has been taking drugs because she believes that she has been demonically possessed. Jason (Morgan McClellan), a production assistant for the film crew, is sympathetic and quickly bonds with Carson - even going so far as to believe her claims after her behavior turns increasingly erratic. During all of this Carson also has several displays of supernatural behavior that is captured on camera but only when she is alone. There are suggestions of bringing in an exorcist, however the clinic's physician Dean Pretiss (Richard Wilkinson) thinks that this would be detrimental to Carson's mental well being. When Carson attacks Jason the show's producer Suzanne (Kate Whitney) begins to push Pretiss for an exorcist, only for him to state that he wants to transfer Carson to a mental institution.

The following day Pretiss gives a much calmer Carson a physical exam and discovers that Jason gave her heroin while she was unconscious, as he now fully believes that the drugs will keep the demons at bay. As a result, Carson is expelled from the clinic and her family withdraws their consent to have her filmed. Not deterred, Jason follows Carson home and continually tries to get in touch with her family, but is repeatedly sent away by her parents, Beth and Steve (Colleen McGrann and Christopher Parker). It's only when he investigates her "friends" that he discovers that she was being bullied at her new school by her new acquaintances. They decided to prank her by forcing her to take part in a Satanic ritual, which is when she got possessed. Jason returns to the Morris family home with the rest of the film crew and breaks into the house demanding to see Carson. Her parents are initially hostile, but grow fearful after they hear Carson screaming upstairs. With no other options, Jason tries to exorcise Carson himself but is unsuccessful and the demon causes the house's power to go out. Carson, now fully possessed, then picks off the house's occupants one by one, including her own mother after she tearfully admits that Carson is a victim of physical abuse. Jason tries to appeal to Carson one last time and is seemingly successful. However their joy is short lived, as Carson's father enters the room and shoots Carson in the head and then kills himself, believing that she is still possessed. A horrified Suzanne is then murdered by Jason, who then turns off the camera currently filming, and it is revealed that his eyes are now pure black, as were Carson's earlier in the film.

== Cast ==
- Lara Vosburgh as Carson Morris
- Morgan McClellan as Jason Hurwitz
- Kate Whitney as Suzanne Tully
- Brian Flaherty as Tim
- Colleen McGrann as Beth Morris
- Christopher Parker as Steve Morris
- Ashley Sutton as McKee Littlefield
- Susan Ateh as Nurse Shanti
- Richard Wilkinson as Dr. Dean Pretiss
- Sewell Whitney as Reverend Foley
- John Cragen as Dr. Krdis
- Adrian Gaeta as Eric

== Reception ==
On review aggregator Rotten Tomatoes, the film holds an approval rating of 64% based on 11 reviews, with an average rating of 4.45/10. Much of the film's criticisms stemmed from what the reviewers felt was an overly familiar premise that did not live up to its full potential, and Den of Geek criticized the movie's script as being overly cliché. Variety wrote a mixed review for Inner Demons. Fangoria and HorrorNews.net both wrote predominantly favorable reviews for the film, and HorrorNews.net commented that "Character development is conveyed with top notch performances from each of the cast all around."
