= Evidence (2012 film) =

- Evidence film poster
- Directed by: Howie Askins
- Written by: Ryan McCoy
- Produced by: Ryan McCoy
- Starring: Ryan McCoy; Brett Rosenberg; Abigail Richie; Ashley Bracken
- Cinematography: Daniel Wall
- Edited by: Howie Askins
- Production company: RynoRyder Productions
- Distributed by: Showbox
- Release date: March 12, 2012
- Running time: 78 minutes
- Country: United States
- Language: English
- Budget: $12,000

Evidence is a 2012 American found footage horror film directed and edited by Howie Askins and produced and written by Ryan McCoy, who also stars in the movie. The film also stars Brett Rosenberg, Abigail Richie and Ashley Bracken.

== Synopsis ==
Ryan is making a documentary on his friend, Brett, about camping for the first time. However, once they begin camping, they discover that there is a mysterious figure that is hunting them.

== Cast ==
- Ryan McCoy as Ryan
- Brett Rosenberg as Brett
- Abigail Richie as Abi
- Ashley Bracken as Ashley
- Zack Fahey as Man in Gown
- Blaine Gray as Rogue Wolf
- Keith Lewis as Lone Wolf
- Risdon Roberts as Sara
- Andrew Varenhorst as Stairway man

== Development ==
Askins began developing Evidence in January 2010 after viewing Paranormal Activity, and began shooting the film in April of the same year. The film was shot in chronological order and the production cost $12,000 to make in its entirety.

== Reception ==
Critical reception for Evidence has been mixed to negative, with Bloody Disgusting saying it "[failed] to scare". Shock Till You Drop panned the film overall, calling it a "good effort" but criticized the film's shift in tone. In contrast, Dread Central gave a more positive review, giving it 3 1/2 out of five blades and praising the film's shift. JoBlo's Arrow in the Head reviewer Matt Withers wrote that he "kinda dug it" but that "a couple of effective scares and some solid visuals aren't enough to make up for a story that makes little attempt to explain itself and drags far too often to be considered truly successful".
