= Alien Abduction: Incident in Lake County =

1998 television film

- Screenplay by: Paul Chitlik
- Story by: Dean Alioto
- Directed by: Dean Alioto
- Starring: Benz Antoine; Kristian Ayre; Gillian Barber; Michael Buie; Emmanuelle Chriqui; Marya Delver; Katlyn Ducharme; Ingrid Kavelaars; Aaron Pearl; Bart Anderson
- Country of origin: United States
- Original language: English

Production
- Running time: 89 minutes
- Production company: Dick Clark Productions

Original release
- Network: UPN
- Release: January 20, 1998

Alien Abduction: Incident in Lake County (Alien Abduction: The McPherson Tape in Australia) originally titled The McPherson Tape is a 1998 American pseudo-documentary horror television film directed by Dean Alioto. Originally aired on UPN on January 18, 1998. Kristian Ayre plays Tommy, a teenager in Lake County, Montana, who is making a home movie of his family's Thanksgiving dinner when they are attacked and ultimately abducted by extraterrestrials. The film is a remake of the 1989 version by the same director.

== Plot ==
An opening narration presents the film as footage recovered from the home of the McPherson family, who disappeared in the Fall of 1997, interspersed with contributions from experts and officials linked to the case.

Teenage Tommy McPherson films his family at Thanksgiving dinner. A power cut interrupts festivities; Tommy and his older brothers Kurt and Brian go outside to investigate. After finding the smouldering fuse box, they head into the woods to investigate a transformer which is throwing sparks.

They find a strange object in a nearby field. As they watch from afar, two aliens exit the object and use a ray-gun on a cow. The three men are spotted. One of the aliens raises its weapon and burns Brian's hand. They run back to the house and try to convince their incredulous family to flee while there is still time. They see lights in the sky and a furtive figure outside a window, but the family refuses to believe the brothers' story until Tommy plays them the tape. Suddenly, a high-frequency screech incapacitates everyone but five-year-old Rosie. When it stops, Kurt plans to evacuate everyone in his truck only to find its battery has melted.

Noises are heard from the roof and Tommy sees an alien entering an open attic window. Kurt leads the way up the stairs with his shotgun. Tommy takes the opportunity to go into his bedroom and change his soiled pants when he is ambushed by an alien. It puts him in a trance, investigates his camera, and slips away, leaving Tommy with no memory of the encounter. Tommy is awakened by the shouts of Kurt, who has trapped an alien in an adjacent room. They are greeted by a laser shot and Kurt responds with his shotgun. They retreat downstairs.

A ball of light enters the house and puts Renee into a coma. Kurt and Brian go outside to try to swap out the truck battery in a final attempt to get the family to safety and take Renee to a hospital. Minutes later, gunshots are heard outside and the lights begin to flicker. Those who remain experience a series of vivid auditory and visual hallucinations to which Rosie seems to be immune. Tommy puts the camera down, and in a moment when she is left alone, Rosie removes the shells from the remaining shotgun. Later, everyone but Rosie feels a burning sensation on the backs of their necks where they discover triangle-shaped burns.

The group becomes hysterical as more shots are heard. They go outside where Tommy discovers a couple of mangled shotguns, but not his brothers. Strange lights and two approaching figures appear in the woods. The family race back into the house and barricade themselves in. The camera is dropped and goes black. Tommy then gives a tearful testimonial and wonders if he will live to see tomorrow. He searches through all the rooms and suddenly comes face-to-face with an alien. Tommy drops the camera and stands frozen in a trance-like state as the tape stops.

=== Alternate ending ===
The family re-enters the house and, after the death of Renee, gather around the table to eat in order to keep up their strength and spirits. Rosie calmly walks offscreen, claiming she has something to attend to. Seconds later, aliens enter the house and place the family in a trance. An alien disables the camera as the family is seen following the aliens out of the house.

== Production ==
Created by Kenneth Cueno Productions, and directed by Dean Alioto, the film portrays a family named the McPhersons being abducted by extra-terrestrials in Lake County, Montana. It is a remake of The McPherson Tape, a home-video-style pseudo-documentary/thriller film created by the same director. The fact that it is a remake of another tape led to confusion over which was the original tape and controversy over whether the original could be authentic. This was due to the fact that most were unaware that The McPherson Tape was in fact a work of fiction. The entire "incident" was recorded on a home video camera by the actor who played the McPherson's 16-year-old son and intended to appear to be as film of actual events.

== Controversy ==
The program caused a level of confusion and controversy upon its initial telecast that echoed earlier reality-muddying incidents such as Orson Welles' War of the Worlds radio broadcast. Alien Abduction: Incident in Lake County aired on UPN immediately following Real Vampires: Exposed!, which offered a tabloid-like investigation of vampires, leading some viewers to believe that Alien Abduction: Incident in Lake County was also portraying real events. Another way in which this video misled its viewers was the way in which it was filmed. The style would soon be made popular through The Blair Witch Project. UFO researchers, including Stanton Friedman, were not informed of the nature of the show by the program's producers, and controversy and confusion also centered on the lack of disclaimers. The program was believed to be based on a factual event; however, the supposed "original" tape that the program was based on was actually another science fiction thriller movie by the same director.

Debate over the hoax nature of the program occurred on Internet chat rooms and bulletin boards, where the program's status as fiction was exposed thanks to the character of Tommy McPherson being linked to actor Kristian Ayre. The program was also proved to be a hoax when an interview with the Lake County Sheriff's department stated that no one named McPherson lived in Lake County at the time. Some viewers continued to insist that portions of the program were fabricated but that the McPhersons' experience itself was real, and others that the program itself was evidence of a conspiracy. The show was subsequently broadcast in New Zealand on TVNZ channel 2, with a disclaimer that its authenticity was still "a topic of dispute" in the United States. TVNZ nevertheless cut the show's final credits, "prevent[ing] New Zealand audiences from noting that the McPhersons were played by actors."

TVNZ programmers pointed out that the subject matter of the mockumentary made it a clearly obvious spoof.

== See also ==
- List of television films produced for UPN
