= Butterfly Kisses (2018 film) =

2018 film

- Poster
- Directed by: Erik Kristopher Myers
- Written by: Erik Kristopher Myers
- Produced by: Carlo Glorioso; Kenny Johnson; Stacie Jones; Erik Kristopher Myers; Robin Nicolai; Cory Okouchi
- Cinematography: Kenny Johnson
- Edited by: Kenny Johnson; Erik Kristopher Myers; Gavin York
- Music by: Cazz Cerkez; Matt Davies
- Production companies: Four-Fingered Films, Cyfuno Ventures
- Distributed by: Gravitas Ventures
- Release date: October 23, 2018
- Running time: 91 minutes
- Country: United States
- Language: English

Butterfly Kisses is a 2018 found footage horror film written and directed by Erik Kristopher Myers. It follows filmmaker Gavin York (Seth Adam Kallick), who discovers videotapes documenting a film-school project about an urban legend known as Peeping Tom. As York attempts to authenticate and publicize the footage, his investigation becomes an obsession that is itself documented by a second film crew.

The film uses this layered found-footage structure to deconstruct the genre, considering how filmmakers and audiences might respond if films such as The Blair Witch Project, The Last Exorcism or Paranormal Activity depicted real events. Myers has also described the film as combining academic criticism with the real-world horror of how far an artist might go in pursuit of a project.

== Plot ==
In May 2015, struggling wedding videographer and film school dropout Gavin York finds a box of tapes labeled "Don't Watch" in the basement of his in-laws' newly purchased home. Intrigued, Gavin watches and edits the tapes on an outdated laptop.

The tapes comprise parts of a March 2004 documentary by film students Sophia and Feldman. The two are trying to prove or disprove the existence of the local urban legend "Peeping Tom", who can ostensibly be summoned by staring down the Ilchester Tunnel at midnight for an entire hour without blinking. Once Peeping Tom arrives, he gets closer to the victim each time they blink, ultimately forcing them to blink by fluttering his eyelashes against their face (a gesture colloquially referred to as "butterfly kisses") before killing them.

The students set up a camera and film the tunnel, reasoning that the camera will act as a human eye. Upon reviewing the footage, they discover Peeping Tom appearing in the camera's view of the tunnel. When Peeping Tom also begins to appear in whatever footage they film elsewhere, they realize that his presence has infested the camera itself; as turning the camera on and off emulates blinking, Peeping Tom gets closer with each clip they film. Feldman's mental state begins to deteriorate, and he is eventually murdered by Peeping Tom, forcing Sophia to continue the project alone.

Seeing a chance to break into filmmaking, Gavin hires a crew to chronicle his discovery of the tapes and his quest to prove Peeping Tom's existence. However, he fails to find any record of Sophia or Feldman's existence. The crew, led by filmmaker Erik Kristopher Myers, begins to suspect that the footage is fake and was created by Gavin himself; their doubts only increase when they discover that Sophia and Feldman had previously won an award for a documentary in which they used an actor to portray a real person.

Unable to garner interest from news stations or local interest groups, Gavin posts the footage online and arranges an interview with a radio host to promote it. During the interview, Gavin is mocked by the station's callers, including The Blair Witch Project co-director Eduardo Sánchez, who dismisses Gavin's film as an obvious derivative. Gavin's obsession with Peeping Tom strains his relationship with his family, culminating in his wife leaving him after discovering that he had used their son's college savings to fund his film.

Gavin instructs the crew to meet him outside the Ilchester Tunnel, where they find him attempting to recreate the Peeping Tom ritual with a camera. The crew begins arguing over whether or not to seek psychiatric help for Gavin, and the other staff accuse Erik of encouraging Gavin's descent into insanity by pushing him to continue working on the film. When they hear what sounds like Gavin running down the tunnel, they go to stop him, only to find that he has vanished, taking the camera with him.

Nine days later, Erik receives a package from Gavin containing a DVCam film, his journal, a hotel keycard, and a separate, smaller parcel addressed to Sophia. In the hotel room, the crew finds Gavin's corpse in the bathtub. After deliberating, they decide against showing their footage to the police. Erik resolves to continue the project despite the rest of the crew imploring him to abandon it. Erik claims he wants to repackage the film as the story of Gavin rather than the story of Peeping Tom; when a crew member asks whether he believes Peeping Tom is real, Erik does not answer.

In additional footage, Sophia, while desperately trying not to blink, recalls a dream in which she was able to stare down the tunnel for the whole hour, only to later realize it was not a dream and that she had, in fact, successfully summoned Peeping Tom. She later claims Peeping Tom is right in front of her, but that she has found a way to defeat him, before shattering a glass picture frame with a hammer and using the shards to slice off her eyelids.

In a mid-credits scene, Erik and his crew watch the contents of the DVCam film, which depicts Sophia through the security camera of an insane asylum, seemingly caressing someone's face, though nobody else is visible on the screen.

== Cast ==
- Rachel Armiger as Sophia Crane
- Reed DeLisle as Feldman
- Matt Lake as 'Mr. Folklore', author for the Weird US book series
- Daniel Furst as Miles Sumner
- Eve Young as Dr. Wolfe
- Kelsey June Swann as Lilly Pine
- Seth Adam Kallick as Gavin York
- Eileen del Valle as Amelia York
- Kaleo Okouchi as Carter York
- Janise Whelan as Eve Hunkeler
- Michael Whelan as Bart Hunkeler
- Erik Kristopher Meyers as Erik
- Eduardo Sánchez as himself
- David Sterritt as himself

== Production ==
Erik Kristopher Myers had met Eduardo Sánchez at a sound design panel in 2014. At first, he was not featured in the script at all, but Erik's producer Cork Okouchi convinced him to call him to see if he would appear in the film. Not only did he appear, but he ended up producing, watched multiple cuts of the film, and helped focus the film from three hours to 91 minutes through feedback and positive criticism.

== Reception ==
The review aggregator website Rotten Tomatoes surveyed 6 critics and assessed all as positive for a 100% rating. Among the reviews, it determined an average rating of 7.8/10.

It won the award for Best Local Film at the 2018 GenreBlast Film Festival. It also won the Jury Award at the 2018 Silver Scream Famous Monsters.

The film was so successful at spreading its local legend that author Shelly Davies Wygant included it in her book Haunted Ellicott City as an actual local legend. Afterward, director Erik Kristopher Myers contacted her to let her know that he had created the legend and seeded it on the internet under a pseudonym. He was initially worried she might be angry; instead, she said she thought it was brilliant.
