= List of horror films of 1998 =

A list of horror films released in 1998.

Horror films released in 1998
Title	Director	Cast	Country	Notes
303 Fear Faith Revenge	Somching Srisupap	Taya Rogers, Ananda Everingham, Arthit Ryu	Thailand	
Apt Pupil	Bryan Singer	Ian McKellen, Brad Renfro, Bruce Davison	United States	Based on the 1982 Stephen King novel
Babae Sa Bintana	Chito S. Roño	Rosanna Roces, Richard Gomez, John Estrada	Philippines	
Blade	Stephen Norrington	Wesley Snipes, Stephen Dorff, Kris Kristofferson	United States	Based on the 1970s Marvel Comics series
Bride of Chucky	Ronny Yu	Jennifer Tilly, Katherine Heigl, Nick Stabile, John Ritter, Alexis Arquette	United States	Fourth entry in the Child's Play film series
Carnival of Souls	Adam Grossman, Ian Kessner	Larry Miller, Shawnee Smith, Bobbie Phillips	United States	Produced by Wes Craven; Remake of the 1962 film classic
Children of the Corn V: Fields of Terror	Ethan Wiley	Stacy Galina, Alexis Arquette, Eva Mendes, Ahmet Zappa	United States	Direct-to-video; Based loosely on a Stephen King story
The Clown at Midnight	Jean Pellerin	Christopher Plummer, Margot Kidder, Melissa Galianos	Canada	
Club Vampire	Andy Ruben	John Savage, Starr Andreef, Mariam Parris	United States	
Curse of the Puppet Master	David DeCoteau (credited as Victoria Sloan)	George Peck, Emily Harrison, Marc Newburger	United States	Produced by Charles Band
Deep Rising	Stephen Sommers	Treat Williams, Famke Janssen, Anthony Heald	United States	
The Dentist 2	Brian Yuzna	Corbin Bernsen, Jillian McWhirter, Linda Hoffman, Clint Howard	United States	Written by Charles Band; Sequel to The Dentist (1996)
Die Hard Dracula	Peter Horak	Bruce Glover, Denny Sachen, Kerry Dustin	United States	Low budget comedy
Dream House	Graeme Campbell	Timothy Busfield, Lisa Jakub, Brennan Elliott, Cameron Graham	United States	Television film
The Faculty	Robert Rodriguez	Clea DuVall, Josh Hartnett, Elijah Wood, Famke Janssen, Jon Stewart, Piper Laurie	United States	
Fantom Kiler	Roman Nowicki	Eliza Borecka, Andrej Jass, Magda Szymborska	Poland	
Frankenstein Reborn!	Julian Breen	Jaason Simmons, Roxana Papa, Haven Paschall, Oana Stefanescu	United States, Romania	Produced in Romania by Full Moon Pictures
Halloween H20: 20 Years Later	Steve Miner	Jamie Lee Curtis, Adam Arkin, Josh Hartnett, Janet Leigh, LL Cool J, Michelle Williams	United States	Seventh film in the Halloween franchise
I Still Know What You Did Last Summer	Danny Cannon	Jennifer Love Hewitt, Freddie Prinze, Jr., Brandy, Bill Cobbs	United States, Mexico, Germany	Sequel to I Know What You Did Last Summer (1997)
I've Been Waiting for You	Christopher Leitch	Sarah Chalke, Markie Post, Soleil Moon Frye, Christian Campbell	United States	Television film Based on the 1997 Lois Duncan novel Gallows Hill
The Last Broadcast	Stefan Avalos, Lance Weiler	Stefan Avalos, Lance Weiler, David Beard, Faith Weiler, Michele Pulaski	United States	
Magandang Hatinggabi	Laurenti M. Dyogi	Angelika Dela Cruz, Jericho Rosales, Angelica Panganiban, Bojo Molina, Mylene Dizon, Marvin Agustin, Diether Ocampo, Jacklyn Jose, Eula Valdez, Allan Paule, Noni Buencamino	Philippines	
The Minion	Jean-Marc Piché	Dolph Lundgren, Françoise Robertson, David Nerman, Roc LaFortune	Canada; United States	Direct to Video
Modern Vampires (a.k.a. Revenant)	Richard Elfman	Casper Van Dien, Kim Cattrall, Udo Kier, Natasha Gregson Wagner, Rod Steiger	United States	
The Mutilation Man	Andrew Copp	Jim Van Bebber, Terek Puckett, Kristy Bowersock	United States	Includes genital mutilation and cannibalism
Nightworld: Lost Souls	Jeff Woolnough	John Savage, Barbara Sukowa, Richard Lintern	Canada	Made as a Canadian television film Filmed in Luxembourg
Phantasm IV: Oblivion	Don Coscarelli	Reggie Bannister, Michael Baldwin, Bill Thornbury, Angus Scrimm	United States	Direct to Video
The Phantom of the Opera	Dario Argento	Andrea Di Stefano, Asia Argento, Julian Sands	Hungary; Italy	Based loosely on the 1910 Gaston Leroux novel Music by Ennio Morricone
The Prophecy II	Greg Spence	Christopher Walken, Brittany Murphy, Jennifer Beals, Russell Wong	United States	Direct-to-video
Psycho	Gus Van Sant	Vince Vaughn, Anne Heche, Viggo Mortensen, William H. Macy, Julianne Moore, Robert Forster	United States	Remake of Psycho franchise
Razor Blade Smile	Jake West	Eileen Daly, David Warbeck, Christopher Adamson, Jonathan Coote, Heidi James	United Kingdom	Premiered at a film festival
Ring (a.k.a. Ringu)	Hideo Nakata	Nanako Matsushima, Hiroyuki Sanada, Miki Nakatani	Japan	Based on the 1991 Koji Suzuki novel Ringu; Remade in America in 2002
Shadow Builder (a.k.a. Bram Stoker's Shadowbuilder)	Jamie Dixon	Michael Rooker, Tony Todd, Shawn Thompson, Leslie Hope, Kevin Zegers	Canada	Based on a short story by Bram Stoker
Shrieker	David DeCoteau (credited as Victoria Sloan)	Tanya Dempsey, Parry Shen, Jenya Lano	United States	Direct to video
Sometimes They Come Back... for More	Daniel Zelik Berk	Clayton Rohner, Damian Chapa, Jennifer O'Dell, Faith Ford, Max Perlich	United States	Sequel to Sometimes They Come Back (1991); Direct to Video; Based on a Stephen King story
Spiral (a.k.a. Rasen)	Jôji Iida	Kôichi Satô, Miki Nakatani, Daisuke Ban	Japan	Sequel to Ring (also 1998); Based on the 1994 novel Spiral
Strangeland	John Pieplow	Dee Snider, Kevin Gage, Linda Cardellini, Elizabeth Pena, Robert Englund, Brett Harrelson	United States	Written by Dee Snider
Tale of the Mummy (a.k.a. Talos, the Mummy)	Russell Mulcahy	Jason Scott Lee, Louise Lombard, Sean Pertwee, Lysette Anthony, Honor Blackman	United Kingdom; United States	The European version is 27 minutes longer
Talisman	David DeCoteau (credited as Victoria Sloan)	Ilinca Goia, Mircea Caraman, Oana Stefanescu	United States	Produced by Charles Band
Trance (released on DVD as The Eternal)	Michael Almereyda	Rachel O'Rourke, Christopher Walken, Lois Smith	United States	Direct to Video
Troublesome Night 3	Herman Yau	Louis Koo, Simon Lui, Vincent Kok, Lee Kin-Yan, Lee Lik-Chi	Hong Kong	
Troublesome Night 4	Herman Yau	Pauline Suen, Simon Lui, Louis Koo, Cheung Tat-Ming, Wayne Lai	Hong Kong	
Tumbling Doll of Flesh	Tamakichi Anaru	Kikurin, Yuuji Kitano, Kanako Ooba, Tamakichi Anaru	Japan	Direct-to-video; Considered one of the most violent splatter films ever made
The Untold Story 2 (a.k.a. Human Flesh Bun 2)	Andy Ng Yiu Kuen	Pauline Suen, Anthony Wong Chau Sang, Emotion Cheung, Yeung Faan	China	
Urban Legend	Jamie Blanks	Jared Leto, Alicia Witt, Rebecca Gayheart, Robert Englund, Brad Dourif	United States, Canada, France	Filmed in Toronto, Canada
Vampires	John Carpenter	James Woods, Daniel Baldwin, Maximilian Schell, Sheryl Lee, Thomas Ian Griffith	United States	Based on the 1990 John Steakley novel
Whispering Corridors (a.k.a. Yeogogoedam)	Park Ki-Yong	Lee Mi-Yun, Park Yong-Su, Lee Yong-Nyuh	South Korea	First in a series of five films
Witchcraft X: Mistress of the Craft (a.k.a. Witchcraft 10)	Elisar Cabrera	Stephanie Beaton, Kerry Knowlton, Eileen Daly, Sean Harry, Wendy Cooper	United States	Tenth film in the WitchCraft film series Shot in England
