= Eileen Daly =

English actress, director, film producer, writer and singer

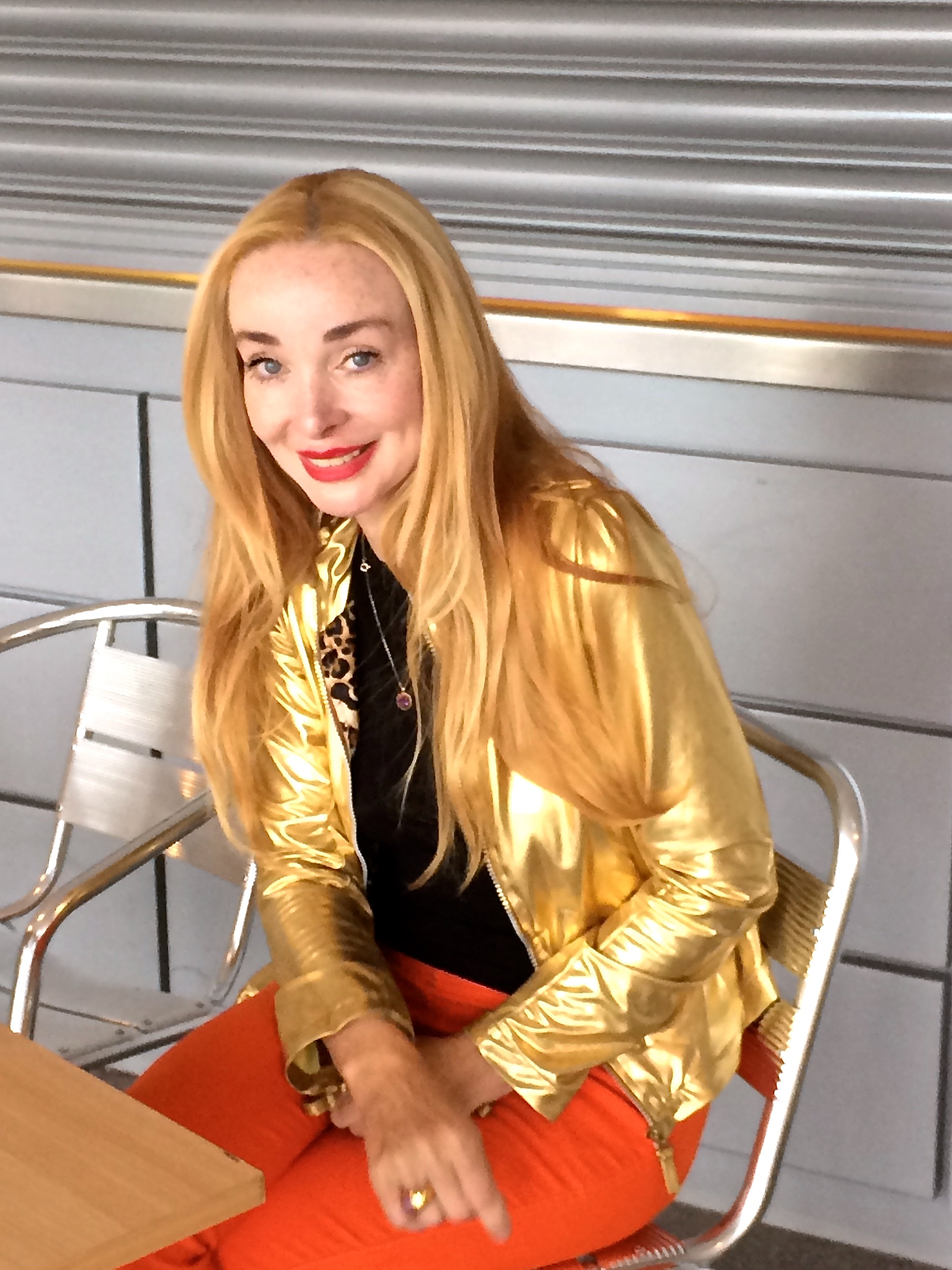
- Daly in 2014
- Born: Eileen Mary Theresa Barnes; 1 June 1963 (age 63); Dulwich, London, England
- Occupations: Actress; model; director; producer; singer-songwriter; pornography actress
- Years active: 1979–present
- Television: Big Brother UK
- Relatives: Nipper Pat Daly (grandfather)

Eileen Mary Theresa Daly (born 1 June 1963) is a British born actress, director, producer, presenter, singer, songwriter, model and retired pornography actress. She is best known as a contemporary scream queen, having starred in numerous cult horror films including; Pervirella (1997), Razor Blade Smile, Witchcraft X: Mistress of the Craft (both 1998), and Cradle of Fear (2001). Her most famous role was as Lilith Silver in the critically acclaimed cult classic, Razor Blade Smile.

== Early life ==
Daly was born in Dulwich, London, to Mary (née Daly) and James Barnes. Her parents divorced when she was three, with her taking her mother's surname. She is the granddaughter of boxer Nipper Pat Daly. she grew up in Hampton Hill, Richmond upon Thames, with her mother and her younger brother Dominique.

She briefly attended drama school before dropping out to pursue private acting lessons instead, being trained by British actress, Fenella Fielding. She left home at a young age and began modelling to earn her living, one of her first magazines appearances was in 1979, with future pornstar Ben Dover.

== Acting career ==
Daly met English horror film director, Nigel Wingrove and together they started up a film production company called Redemption Films. The company logo featured an image of Daly, which became part of its marketing strategy with Daly featuring as Redemption Films, Dark Angel character, in specially filmed introductions for many of their cult films released under the label. In 1995, a short film titled Redemption Films, was released based around Daly's Dark Angel character. French film director Jean Rollin met with Daly and Wingrove in Paris to discuss Daly potentially leading roles in his films.

Daly has appeared in various cult films including; All About Anna, Cradle of Fear, Kannibal, Pervirella, Razor Blade Smile, Witchcraft X: Mistress of the Craft, Evil Calls: The Raven, Rose, Sacred Flesh and The Amityville Asylum. She worked alongside American actor and filmmaker Joe Zaso and German director and musician Timo Rose, culminating in several films including; Karl The Butcher vs. Axe and independent titles such as; Braincell, Darkness Surrounds Roberta, Timo Rose's Beast and Unrated. She has appeared in many other independent horror films such as; Demonsoul, Cynthia Payne's House of Syn, Archangel Thunderbird, Sentinels of Darkness, N[eon], Machines of Love and Hate, Messages and Monsters of the ID.

Daly's first large role was in a supporting role, in 1997's independent horror, Pervirella, alongside Emily Booth. The film also featured a cameo from British broadcaster, Jonathan Ross. The following year in 1998, she landed a second supporting role in the tenth installment of the Witchcraft horror series, Witchcraft X: Mistress of the Craft, which despite its cult following received negative reviews. In 2001, she had a supporting role in the independent horror, Cradle of Fear.

Daly's first lead role was in the independent horror, Razor Blade Smile, which she won multiple awards for. Including an independent award - Vampire Oscar at Vampyria II in London, at the first B-Movie Film Festival in 1999, Daly was awarded Best B-Film Actress. The film also won awards for Best B-Film Director, Best B-Film Cinematography and Best B-Film Special Effects. SFX Magazine and GamesRadar+ voted Daly's character, Lilith Silver, the 30th sexiest vampire of all time. In 2026, Razor Blade Smile was re-released in 4K resolution.

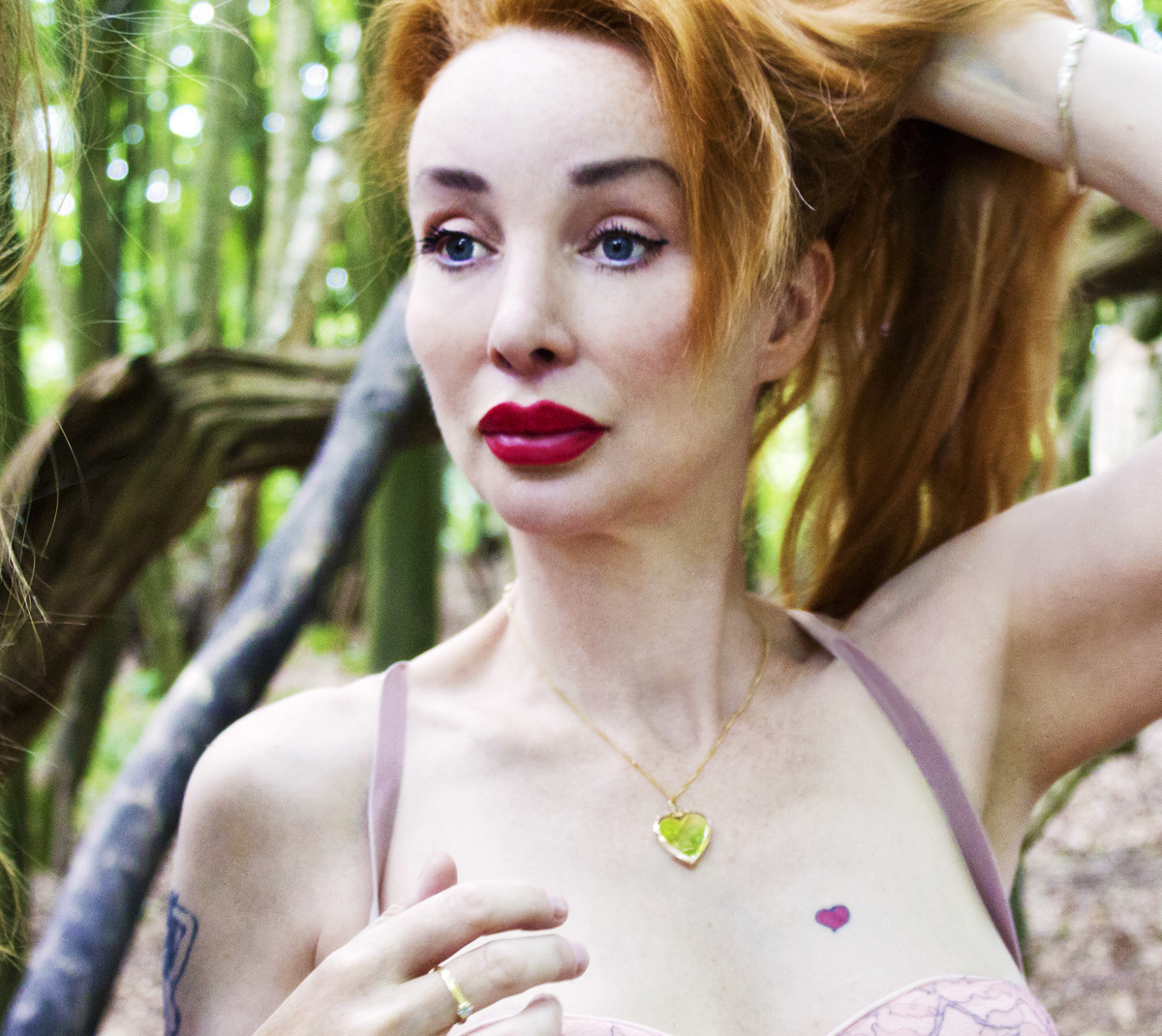
Daly in a 2013 short film.

In 2005, she appeared in the Danish Erotic film, All About Anna, playing the supporting role of Camilla. Director Jessica Nilsson, made the film to appeal to a female audience, featuring hardcore sex scenes and softcore sex scenes, with Daly performing fellatio on lead actor Adrian Bouchet. The film complies with a "Puzzy Power Manifesto", laying down strict guidelines of what should and should be included in a film, in order for it to be tailored for a female audience, rather than a male audience.

She made uncredited appearances in the 1995, film Richard III and the 2005, film Alone in the Dark.

In 2026, she began working with British film director Jason Impey on a Jack the Ripper inspired horror film titled; Echoes of Crimson.

Daly has appeared in television shows including; Beck, EastEnders, Our Friends in the North, Sexxx, Screen One, Snuff Box, Soldier Soldier, The Fast Show and The Human Animal. In 2012, Daly became a regular on Loaded TV's sitcom Sexxx, playing the role Miss Kitty. She also took part in play-readings at the Royal Court Theatre in London.

== Television career ==
Daly appeared as a regular guest on television shows; Sex & Shopping, Eurotrash, The Big Breakfast and Kilroy. She was a contestant on the 1997, game show Karaoke Challenge and also was featured in the 1998, ITV reality series, Nightlife.

With the formation of Redemption TV, with her then boyfriend and business partner Nigel Wingrove, Daly was given the chance to present her own magazine show, where she interviewed actors, friends and musicians. Notable interviewee's included; The IT Crowd star, Matt Berry and British rock band, Nosferatu. She also played Redemption Films character The Dark Angel, in a number of specially filmed introductions and promos for the British television channel, Bravo.

In 2012, Daly started her own production company named Gipsyphilia Productions. She began directing and producing independent films and television shows, including a documentary series titled, Daly Does, which featured episodes such as; Daly Does The Dead, a ghost hunting episode that took her team to a haunted hotel in Whitby. Gipsyphilia Productions went on to make other television series for Loaded TV including; Daly Does Ghosts, Daly Does Ben Dover, Daly Does Pornstars, Daly Does Webcam Girls and the short film Mr Crispin at your Cervix. She was also a Team Captain on Loaded TV's game show; Come Again, alongside Ben Dover.

In 2014, Daly took part in the ninth series of The X Factor UK as a duo alongside her then boyfriend, Ben Thirkettle. They passed the auditions stage, but were eliminated during the Bootcamp stage.

In 2015, Daly entered the sixteenth series of Big Brother UK. She entered the house on Day 1, and was evicted on Day 25, placing twelfth overall, leaving the house to a positive reaction. She faced the public vote, to be evicted on week one, but was saved by the public. She notably feuded with fellow housemate, Simon Gross. During her time on Big Brother, she revealed that she performed in pornography films while underaged.

== Modelling career ==
Daly lived with video director Tim Pope, who directed promotions for bands including; Siouxsie and the Banshees and The Cure. She is friends with Marc Almond, appearing in several music videos for the British synthpop duo Soft Cell, including as the female lead their hit singles, Say Hello, Wave Goodbye and Tainted Love. Pope's videos for the band appeared on the video album; Soft Cell's Non-Stop Exotic Video Show, a companion release to their debut album, Non-Stop Erotic Cabaret. She also appeared in music videos for Cathedral and Pulp. Daly also worked as a stripper. She posed on the cover of many of their magazines and also posed nude in a fourteen page centrefold for Penthouse magazine in 1984, under the stage name Grace. In 1989, Daly became a performer as one of the Penthouse Roadshow girls during their UK tour.

In 1996, Daly was the face for First Choice Holidays, appearing in print and television advertisements - The People newspaper outed Daly as a "blue movie queen" who had starred in "kinky videos, featuring bondage and lesbian sex scenes." they also said the revelations about Daly's past would come as a shock to the bosses of the company. Daly also modelled in advertisements for the BBC and Toyota.

Daly was one of the first models for Agent Provocateur's lingerie range. She appeared on The Big Breakfast and Kilroy show's promoting and modelling the brand. She appeared as the covergirl of magazines; Bite Me, Bizzare, Bloodstone, Skin Two, The Chronicles Redeemer, The Dark Side, The Chronicles and Time Out. After her appearance in The Dark Side, she became a regular contributor and columnist, reviewing independent films and interviewing directors. She also briefly worked in radio, presenting for Deal Radio in Kent and for FM1FM radio.

== Pornography career ==
In 1979, Daly visited an agent in a Soho above a strip club with her mother, shortly after she began appearing in films, under the name Eileen Bailey, produced by Danish pornographic company, Color Climax Corporation including; Big Tit Dreamer and Lucky Lesbians. Her debut video was with Ben Dover, which coincidentally was also Dover's debut video. She revealed while appearing on Big Brother UK she was underage in the films, as between the years of 1969 to 1979, Color Climax was responsible for the relatively large-scale of distribution of child pornography.

Throughout the '80s, she worked as a fetish and glamour model under many different aliases, posing nude in erotic magazines for Color Climax Corporation, including in hardcore bisexual, lesbian and threesome pornographic photography. She posed on the cover of many of their magazines and also posed nude in a fourteen page centrefold for Penthouse magazine in 1984, under the stage name Grace. In 1989, Daly became a performer as one of the Penthouse Roadshow girls during their UK tour. She posed in pornographic photoshoots and on the cover for many other magazines including; Fiesta, Parade, Playbirds, Sexy, Swish and Whitehouse.

Between the years of 1985-1987 she sporadically appeared in Playboy TV's show Electric Blue. In 1991, she starred in Linzi Drew's Striptacular video. In 1999, she had a leading role in the softcore-pornographic erotic horror film, Sacred Flesh.

== Music career ==
Daly formed the band Jezebel, in 1998. They played music described by Daly as "an eclectic mix of rock, goth and perverse fairy tales." The first album, Forbidden Fruit, was officially released in March 2004, by the record label Triple Silence. Their single Plastic Surgery, was featured in the Cradle of Fear's official soundtrack. Another single from the album titled You're So Cute, featured in film All About Anna, performed onscreen by Daly herself.

Daly released a single on her own titled, Persuasion, performing it on Eurotrash. She worked alongside music producer Steven Severin who had previously provided music for the film Visions of Ecstasy for Daly's then partner Nigel Wingrove.

Daly formed a new band named, Eileen and Ben, with her partner Ben Thirkettle, putting Jezebel officially on hold. The duo played a combination of what they describe as "gypsy and glam rock". Their debut single titled Webcam Girl, was released in 2007 and was followed up with an EP entitled; Elfing Around. They made appearances at festivals in Glastonbury and at the Bram Stoker International Film Festival. The duo appeared on The X Factor in 2014, making it to the Bootcamp stage. The duo also performed under the name, The Chelsea Vampires. After her eviction from the Big Brother house, she performed several of her songs on Big Brother after show, Big Brother's: Bit on the Side.

== Personal life ==
She is friends with Marc Almond, appearing in several music videos for the British synthpop duo Soft Cell including as the female lead their hit singles, Say Hello, Wave Goodbye and Tainted Love.

Daly is an animal rights activist, a vegetarian and a supporter of the Green Party. She owns her own vintage clothing charity shop in Swanage, Dorset.

== Filmography ==
Film credits
Year	Title	Role	Notes
1990	Faustine	Faustine	Short film
1991	Magick	Possessed model	Silent film, short film
1991	Hair Razor	Actress	Short film
1993	The Babysitter	Mother	
1995	Demonsoul	Selena	
1995	Cynthia Payne's House of Cyn	Prostitute	
1995	Redemption Films	The Dark Angel	Short film
1995	Richard III	Ballroom extra	Uncredited
1996	Payday	Dianne	
1996	M.I.A	Call girl	Short film
1997	Pervirella	Cu-Rare	
1998	Witchcraft X: Mistress of the Craft	Raven	
1998	Hotter Than Hell: The Erotic Movie Set	Raven	Short film
1998	Archangel Thunderbird	Miki Manson	
1998	Razor Blade Smile	Lilith Silver	
1999	Sacred Flesh	Catechsim	
2001	Kannibal	Tanya Sloveig	
2001	Cradle of Fear	Natalie	
2002	Sentinels of Darkness	Velislava	
2002	N[eon]	The Ghost	Short film
2003	Machines of Love and Hate	Cynthia Marks	
2005	Alone in the Dark	Extra	Uncredited
2005	All About Anna	Camilla	
2006	The Last Exorcism	Extra	Short film
2006	Satanic Sluts: The Black Order Cometh	Satanic Slut	
2007	Messages	Denise	
2007	Monsters of the ID	Jetstream Jenny	
2007	Darkness Surrounds Roberta	Eleanor Maynard	
2007	Satanic Sluts 2: The Black Masses	Satanic Slut	
2008	Satanic Sluts 3: Scandalised	Satanic Slut	
2009	Timo Rose's Beast	Lydia	Associate producer
2009	Albion Rising	Charlotte Mew	
2009	Little Miss Macabre	N/A	Executive producer, unreleased
2010	Braincell	Nurse Audra	Associate producer
2010	Unrated	Cassandra	Co-executive producer
2010	Karl The Butcher vs. Axe	Queen Scarar	
2010	The Horror Vault 3	Missing Woman	
2011	Evil Calls: The Raven	Victoria	
2012	Exception Reporting	Assistant	Short film
2012	Shades of Grey	Trixie Trent	Short film
2012	Rose	Yondra	
2012	Silent Cradle	Chloe	
2013	The Amityville Asylum	Sadie Krenwinkel	
2013	Quiet Night Out	Ice Queen	Short film
2013	Life.Love.Regret	The Woman	Short film
2013	Fool's Day	N/A	Special thanks, short film
2014	Mr. Crispin at your Cervix	Hostess	Executive producer, short film
2014	Hollywood Betrayed	Presenter	Executive producer
2015	Blood Pact	Eileen	Executive producer
2016	The Curse of the Witches Blood	Sarah	
2016	The Tombs: Rise of the Damned	Extra	Uncredited
2017	Sinema	Tess Runckle	Executive producer
2017	Tearful Surrender	Dream Witch	
2017	Assassins Revenge	Elizabeth Bathory	
2018	Terror in the Scream	Narrator	Short film
2020	Doctor Sleepless	Victoria	
2021	Zombie Lover	Isla	
2021	The Turning	Elsa	
2023	Witches Brew	Miss Eileen	Executive producer
2024	Slasher House 3	Vixen	
2025	She's A B*tch	Priest	Executive producer
2025	Dracula: Rise of the Vampire	Elizabeth	
2025	Dark Dates	Roadman	Executive producer, comedy short
2026	Echoes of Crimson	Mary Kelly	Executive producer, currently filming

Television credits as actress
Year	Title	Role	Notes
1985-1987	Electric Blue	Pornographic actress	3 episodes
1990	Screen One	Stripogram	1 episode ("Sweet Nothing")
1994	The Human Animal	Example human	1 episode ("Beyond Survival")
1995	Soldier Soldier	Stripper	1 episode ("Money For Nothing")
1996	Our Friends in the North	Dancer	1 episode ("1967")
1996	The Fast Show	Model	1 episode, uncredited
1996	EastEnders	Extra	1 episode, uncredited
1996	Beck	Extra	1 episode, uncredited
1996	Nightmare: The Birth of Victorian Horror	Mary Shelley / Dracula's bride	2 episodes ("Frankenstein") & ("Dracula")
2006	Snuff Box	Date	1 episode ("Love Triangle")
2012	Sexxx	Miss Kitty	7 episodes

Television credits as self
Year	Title	Role	Notes
1991	Channel 4 Banned Seasons	Self; guest	1 episode
1991	Bookmark	Self; guest	1 episode
1994	The Big Breakfast	Self; guest	4 episodes
1994	Kilroy	Self; guest	2 episodes
1997	Redemption Presents	Self; presenter	Recurring role
1997	Karaoke Challenge	Self; contestant	1 episode
1998	This Is Hardcore	Self; feature	Documentary
1998	Sex & Shopping	Self; feature	1 episode
1998	Nightlife	Self; feature	1 episode
1999	A Bunny Girl's Tale	Self; model	Documentary
1999	Eurotrash	Self; performer	2 episodes
1999	Cradle of Filth: Pandaemonaeon	Self; feature	Documentary
2005	The Love-Making of All About Anna	Self; actress	Documentary
2006	The Peekaboo Show	Self; presenter	Recurring role
2012	Come Again	Self; team captain	8 episodes
2013	Daly Does...	Self; presenter	Executive producer, documentary, 6 episodes
2014	The Bryce is Right	Self; presenter	Executive producer, documentary
2014	The First Bite is the Deepsest	Self; presenter	Executive producer, documentary
2014	A Thousand Faces	Self; feature	Executive producer, documentary
2014	The X Factor UK series 9	Self; contestant	2 episodes
2014	Lorraine	Self; guest	1 episode ("September, 16, 2014")
2014	The RAW Factor	Self; judge	Unaired pilot
2015	Big Brother UK series 16	Self; housemate	12th place, 27 episodes
2015	Big Brother's Bit on the Side	Self; ex-housemate	8 episodes
2015	London Live News	Self; guest	1 episode
2017	Tattoo Fixers on Holiday	Self; customer	1 episode ("Episode #2.2")
2018	Celebrity Ghost Hunt	Self; ghost hunter	Unaired pilot
2025	Razor Blade Smile: Vampires Forever	Self; feature	Documentary
2026	Horror-on-Sea: 13 Bloody Years	Self; feature	Documentary

Television adverts
Year	Advert	Role	Notes
1990	Cukiernia Mistrza Jana Chocolat	Marilyn Monroe	Female lead
1993	BBC Proms	Viewer	Female lead
1995	Sci-Fi	The Dark Angel	Female lead
1996	First Choice Holidays	Mother	Female lead
1996	Toyota Starlet	Starlet	Female lead
1997	Bravo	The Dark Angel	Female lead

Music videos
Year	Title	Artist	Role
1981	Sex Dwarf	Soft Cell	Female lead
1981	Tainted Love	Soft Cell	Female lead
1981	Frustration	Soft Cell	Female lead
1982	Say Hello, Wave Goodbye	Soft Cell	Female lead
1982	Soft Cell's Non-Stop Exotic Video Show	Soft Cell	Self; friend of Marc Almond
1996	Hopkins (The Witchfinder General)	Cathedral	Female lead
1998	This Is Hardcore	Pulp	Model

Pornography credits
Year	Title	Role	Notes
1979	Big Tit Dreamer	Actress	Pornography debut, credited as Eileen Bailey
1979	Lucky Lesbians	Actress	
1979	Schoolgirls 5	Actress	
1979	Exciting Video 510	Actress	
1980	Party Plan	Actress	
1980	Peepshow Loops 142	Actress	
1980	Exciting Video 529	Actress	
1981	Randy Rocker	Actress	
1981	Sexy Girls 39	Model	Non-sex scenes
1982	Lesbian Love 11	Actress	
1982	Beautiful Boobs	Actress	
1985	Electric Blue: Bra Busters	Actress	
1986	Half Term Punishments	Actress	
1987	Electric Blue 48	Actress	
1990	Electric Blue: The Best of Electric	Actress	
1991	Striptacular	Actress	Non-sex scenes
1994	Electric Blue: Suburban Wives 8	Actress	
2000	Hottest Lesbian Vampires	Actress	
2000	Naked Nuns	Repression	
2003	Fiona Cooper V277	Hazel	Non-sex scenes
2003	Shiny People 3	Model	Fetish, non-sex scenes
2003	Private Sports 5: Surf Fuckers	Actress	Credited as Aileen Bailey, non-sex scenes
2008	Fiona Cooper V973	Hazel	Archive footage from Fiona Cooper V277, non-sex scenes

== Discography ==
Year	Title	Notes
2004	Forbidden Fruit	with the group, Jezebel
2007	Webcam Girl	
2009	Elfing Around	
2015	Next Stop Vegas	with the group, Eileen and Ben

== Awards and accomplishments ==
B-Movie Film Festival: Vampyria II

- Best B-Film Actress: Vampire Oscar (1999)
