= Nigel Wingrove =

English horror film director (born 1957)

Nigel Wingrove (born 26 October 1957) is the founder of the horror film company Salvation Films and the Redemption film label and creator of the online alternative female collective, the Satanic Sluts. He is also a film director and the only director to have had a film banned in the UK on the grounds of blasphemy.

== Redemption films ==
Wingrove founded the film distribution company Redemption Films (now called Salvation Films) in 1992, which was the first UK company to specialise in releasing obscure European films by directors such as Jean Rollin, Jess Franco, Dario Argento and Peter Walker. Redemption's logo features a white, eyeless face, which is of Wingrove's former girlfriend, the actress and scream queen, Eileen Daly.

== Films ==
Separate to his work as managing director of Salvation Films, Wingrove has written and directed a number of low-budget films including Sacred Flesh (2000), "Red Kiss" (2004), Sexcretares (2005), Purple Haze (2005) and three titles; The Black Order Cometh (2006), The Black Masses (2007), and Scandalised (2008), in the Satanic Sluts range. Wingrove's early film work included the short erotic film Visions of Ecstasy (1989), which is an interpretation of the writings of Carmelite nun Saint Teresa of Avila with a soundtrack by Steven Severin of Siouxsie and the Banshees and would go on to be banned from distribution on the grounds of blasphemy. Wingrove is currently working on a nunsploitation film, "Sisters of Armageddon", and an Alice in Wonderland inspired title: "Alice in the Underworld" and producing a series of cosplay themed films for Ghoul Girls, a sister film label to the Satanic Sluts.

== Anti-censorship ==
In 1996, Wingrove challenged the British Board of Film Classification, which had refused to grant a distribution certificate for his short film Visions of Ecstasy on the grounds that it was blasphemous, at the European Court of Human Rights. He claimed that the ban breached Article 10 of the European Convention on Human Rights and was disproportionate. Wingrove's case was supported by the notable figures such as authors Salman Rushdie and Fay Weldon, and film director Derek Jarman, however The Court dismissed the claim and accepted that the criminal law of blasphemy, as it was applied in England, did not infringe the right to freedom of expression under Article 10. In 1994, Wingrove had also contested the BBFC's refusal to grant a certificate to the films Bare Behind Bars, Demoniac (also known as Exorcism) and Sadomania at the Video Appeals Committee, though without success. Visions of Ecstasy was eventually released uncut in 2012, following the 2008 repeal of the UK's blasphemy laws.

== Other work ==
=== Designs ===
Wingrove is also known for his design work, which has a dark erotic style. He has worked on the fetish magazine Skin Two and, from 1992 to 1996, he was involved with the emerging Black Metal band Cradle of Filth, who licensed a number of Wingrove's images for use as their artwork on albums and t-shirts including the infamous "Jesus is a Cunt" design. Wingrove went on to art direct three albums for the band, the last being Dusk... and Her Embrace, though a great many of Wingrove's conceived images can be found in the definitive book on the band, "Gospel of Filth" (Fab Press, 2009), written by Gavin Baddeley.

=== Publications ===
Wingrove has two books published; "The Art of the Nasty", co-authored with Marc Morris, and "Blood and Dishonour: The Dark, Bloody and Peversely Erotic World of the Satanic Sluts – Satan’s True Sirens". Wingrove has also designed and edited several similarly themed inhouse magazines for Salvation Films, including The Redeemer (1992 - 1995), and the newspaper styled Nihilista (2007-2008) and oversaw the redesign and relaunched of Rule Satannia, a satanic themed magazine linked to the Church of Satan. Wingrove also writes a regular blog, and runs the related quasi arts and politics site "Scum Nation". Wingrove is currently writing his first major reference work, "Strength Through Design – Print Propaganda in the Third Reich" which looks in detail at the magazines and newspapers published by the NSDAP between 1920 and 1945.

Art

Wingrove is currently working on an exhibition of new images inspired by his book, Strength Through Design – Print Propaganda in the Third Reich.

== Filmography ==
- Axel (1988), a title inspired by a short story by symbolist writer Auguste Villiers de l'Isle-Adam
- Visions of Ecstasy (1989), an interpretation of the writings of Carmelite nun Saint Teresa of Avila with a soundtrack by Steven Severin of Siouxsie and the Banshees, and the only film to be banned by the BBFC on the grounds of blasphemy
- Faustine (1990), a short interpretation of Swinburne's poem "Faustine"
- Sacred Flesh (1999), an independent Nunsploitation film.
- Satanic Sluts: The Black Order Cometh (2007), the first in a series of films depicting the online female collective, Satanic Sluts
- Satanic Sluts II: The Black Masses (2008), a documentary including footage of live performances by Satanic Sluts held at Wingrove's alternative night club night, Black Mass
- Satanic Sluts III: Scandalized (2009), the latest in the Satanic Sluts series, featuring Georgina Baillie and Michelle Thorne
