= Richard Wells (composer) =

British film, TV and games composer

- Occupation: Composer
- Children: 2

Richard Wells is a British film, TV and games composer.

Wells began his composing career writing music for computer games in 1994, after meeting games composer Dave Punshon. He met horror film director Jake West in 1997 whilst working on computer game MIA. This led to him starting a career in film in 1998, scoring for West's first film Razor Blade Smile, an extremely low-budget film. Since then, Wells has worked on two more films with Jake West: Evil Aliens and Doghouse.

In 2002, Wells began to score music for film trailers. He has now composed for over 50 film trailers including The Grudge, Infernal Affairs, and Seven Swords. His recent credits include re-scoring the Thai martial arts film Ong-Bak in 2005, scoring for Mutant Chronicles in 2009, and working on Toby Whithouse's TV series Being Human.

Wells lives in the UK with his wife and two children.
