= Sacred Flesh =

1999 film by Nigel Wingrove

- Directed by: Nigel Wingrove
- Written by: Nigel Wingrove
- Produced by: Louise Ross
- Starring: Sally Tremaine; Moyna Cope; Simon Hill; Rachel Taggart
- Cinematography: Chris Herd; James MacDonald; Geoff Mills
- Edited by: Chris Shaw; Jake West
- Music by: Steve Pittis; Band of Pain
- Distributed by: Salvation Films
- Release date: 1999
- Running time: 75 minutes
- Country: United Kingdom
- Language: English

Sacred Flesh is a 1999 British nunsploitation erotic horror film directed and written by Nigel WIngrove and starring Sally Tremaine, Moyna Cope, Simon Hill and Rachel Taggart. It is set in an indeterminate past, and consists of a series of loosely connected vignettes that depict pseudo-lesbian sexuality and some sado-masochistic activity.

== Plot ==
Sister Elizabeth, the mother superior of a medieval convent, has visions of Mary Magdalene and a skeletal dead nun. Father Henry, the abbot, and his servant Richard are summoned by the convent's abbess to help with the hysteria spreading among the order.

Elizabeth recounts the confessions and fantasies of the nuns, flagellating herself and becoming excited as she does so: Sister Sarah masturbates; Sisters Mary and Helena flagellate one another and then have sex. Sister Catherine is violated by Fathers James and Peter. Finally, Sisters Jane, Teresa and Helen engage in three-way sex and violate Sister Ann after tying her to a cross. Elizabeth writhes violently in her cell and, as she dies, is tormented by visions of a crucified woman and Christ's beating Sacred Heart.

Mother Elizabeth and an (imagined) demonic Mary Magdalene (who has relapsed from sainthood, back into the sex worker the church once claimed she was) debate desire and chastity within what seems to be a heavenly antechamber. Mary remarks to Elizabeth that, as her convent is full of repressed female desire, the Mother Superior too is enveloped within this voluptuous fold. Elizabeth details four fantasy vignettes. These are interspersed with conversations between the convent's former abbess, a priest, Abbess Elizabeth, an odd dead zombie nun and an actress Eileen Daly playing the spirit of Catechism.

The sex scenes conform to standard pornographic sequencing. They each start simply and culminate in erotic release at the end. There are scenes of the full lesbian sexual gamut, which extends from episodes of individual nuns' self-stimulation to non-monogamous lesbian sex to a final nun-centered crucifix-bondage scene, with copious use of the whip and the rope.

== Cast ==
- Sally Tremaine as Abbess Elizabeth, Mother Superior
- Moyna Cope as Former Abbess
- Simon Hill as Abbot Henry
- Kristina Bill as Mary Magdalene
- Rachel Taggart as Catechism
- Eileen Daly as Repression
- Daisy Weston as Sister Brigitte
- Moses Rockman as Richard
- Emily Booth as Williams girl
- Willow as herself
- Laura Plair as succubus
- Leasa Carlyon as peasant
- Louise Linehan as Marion
- Mary Grant as nun
- Daisy Weston as nun
- Leasa Carlyon as nun
- Nicole Bouchet as jailed nun
- Louise Ross as insane nun
- Cindy Read as dominatrix nun
- Michelle Thorne as Sister Sarah
- Marc Morris as Inquisitor
- Chris Charlston as Inquisitor
- Hannah Callow as Sister Helena
- Amanda Dawkins as Sister Mary
- Majella Shepherd as Novice Catherine
- Christopher Adamson as Father Peter
- Philip Serfaty as Father James
- Nicole Bouchet as Sister Helen
- Cassandra Bochsler as Sister Teresa
- Anneka Svenska as Sister Ann
- Sarah McLean as Sister Jane
- Cindy Read as Christa
