= Anneka Svenska =

British wildlife presenter and actress

- Born: Anne Caroline Barrett; 26 January 1974 (age 52); High Wycombe, Buckinghamshire, England
- Occupations: presenter; actress; journalist; conservationist
- Years active: 2011–present
- Known for: Research of wolves

Anneka Svenska (born Anne Caroline Barrett; 26 January 1974) is a British wildlife presenter, actress, journalist, conservationist and wolf enthusiast.

== Early life ==
Svenska was born Anne Caroline Barrett in High Wycombe, Buckinghamshire, and later adopted the stage name 'Anneka Svenska'.

== Career ==
Svenska began her career as an actress in the late 1990s, starring in Silent Whisper (1997), Threesome (1999), Sacred Flesh (1999), The Lost Son (1999). Svenska gained media attention when she fronted the Channel 5 show OutTHERE (2001–2003). Since 2013, she has hosted several conservationist events, including the YouTube channel Animal Watch, which explores the nature and history of various animals, mostly wolves and dogs. Svenska, a passionate animal rights activist, specialises in canine behaviour. She is the founder of Green World TV, an online YouTube Channel, and a patron of the World Animal Day.

Svenska defended Steve Irwin against criticism of mishandling animals. In 2016, she wore the largest hat ever worn at Ascot in order to campaign against horse racing deaths.

== Personal life ==
She is vegan and practises yoga.
