= Evil Aliens =

- Poster for Evil Aliens
- Directed by: Jake West
- Written by: Jake West
- Produced by: Falcon Film Productions
- Starring: Emily Booth; Christopher Adamson; Norman Lovett
- Edited by: Jake West
- Music by: Richard Wells
- Distributed by: ContentFilm
- Release dates: 31 July 2005 (München Fantasy Filmfest); 10 March 2006 (United Kingdom)
- Running time: 89 minutes
- Country: United Kingdom
- Language: English

Evil Aliens is a 2005 British slapstick horror comedy film directed by Jake West.

It was the first full-length British horror film to be filmed using Sony HD (High Definition) cameras.

== Plot ==
The film begins with the alien abduction on Scalleum, a remote island off the coast of Wales, of Cat Williams and her boyfriend. Cat's boyfriend is gorily killed through brutal anal probing, and Cat is (also gorily) implanted with an alien fetus. Cat's story attracts the attention of Michelle "Foxy" Fox, the bosomy host of the cable TV show Weird Worlde, who brings a film crew to the island — her cameraman boyfriend Ricky; Jack the sound man; nerdy UFO expert Gavin Gorman; and actors Bruce Barton and Candy Vixen (the latter, Foxy's producer assures her, "because she's good, not because she's my girlfriend").

The island is accessible via a narrow causeway only at low tide. The Weird Worlde crew sets out in their van, but it is dark by the time they reach the Williams family's creepy farmhouse, where they meet Cat and her three hulking and sadistic brothers (who speak only Welsh with English subtitles). The crew (with the exception of Gavin Gorman) initially assume that Cat's story is a hoax, and even go so far as to make a crop circle in a nearby field so they can film it for the show, to Gorman's great disgust. However, it soon turns out that the aliens are all too real and rather malevolent.

The film crew teams up with the Welsh Williams brothers to fight off the aliens, with a great deal of blood and gore. One highlight features Ricky running down some aliens in a combine harvester, to the tune of "Combine Harvester (Brand New Key)" by The Wurzels.

Eventually, the alien child inside Cat claws its way out; on board the alien ship, Foxy is impregnated with another alien fetus while Gavin loses his virginity to a shapely female alien; Bruce, Candy, and the Welsh brothers meet various horrible demises; Ricky blows up himself and four alien pursuers in a tank of liquid manure; back at the house, the female alien rips Foxy in half; and finally Gavin manages to use his laptop (in a sequence reminiscent of Independence Day) to overload the ley lines of the nearby stone circle. As Cat's alien child rips his arms off, Gavin manages to press the space bar with his nose, sending the stones shooting into the underside of the alien craft, which crashes into a convenient mountain. Jack the sound man, meanwhile, having been blinded by alien ichor early in the film, swims across the channel to the mainland, only to discover that he's lost the videotape that was the only proof of their extraterrestrial encounter.

The film ends with a clip from an alien talk show reminiscent of Jerry Springer (and subtitled in English), on which Gavin's female alien is trying to explain how her entire crew was killed by humans and she herself carries the love child of one of those humans. The audience roars with laughter, and the host cuts her mike.

== Cast ==
The film features an ensemble cast including TV presenter Emily Booth, Jamie Honeybourne, Christopher Adamson, Norman Lovett, Scott Joseph, model Jodie Shaw, and Jennifer Evans.

- Emily Booth – Michelle Fox
- Jamie Honeybourne – Gavin Gorman
- Sam Butler – Ricky Anderson
- Jodie Shaw – Candy Vixen
- Peter McNeil O'Connor – Jack Campbell
- Nick Smithers – Bruce Barton
- Norman Lovett – Howard Marsden
- Christopher Adamson – Llyr Williams/Surgeon Alien
- Jennifer Evans – Cat Williams
- Mark Richard Hayes – Dai Williams
- Chris Thomas – Thomas Williams
- Scott Joseph – Lead Alien
- Mildred von Heildegard – Female Alien
- Tim Clark, Mark Holloway, Glenn Collier – Aliens
- Tree Carr – Dream Alien
- Dan Palmer – Onkey (UFO Witness 1)
- James Heathcote – Merv (UFO Witness 2)

== Production ==
Evil Aliens is the second film from director Jake West (Razor Blade Smile). The film was produced by Tim Dennison (Lighthouse, Revenge of Billy the Kid, Silent Cry); the executive producer was Quentin Reynolds.

== Filming ==
Although the film is set in Wales, most of it was actually filmed on a farm in Cambridgeshire, including the combine harvester sequence and the UFO crash. The harvester was provided by a local agricultural contracting firm, and driven by one of their staff (whose hand is visible controlling the harvester during much of the sequence).

== Soundtrack ==
- "Combine Harvester (Brand New Key)" by The Wurzels

== Release ==
After showings at various film festivals in 2005, Evil Aliens was released in the UK on March 10, 2006, by ContentFilm International, who also act as international sales agents. Image Entertainment released the film in U.S. cinemas on September 6, 2006. It was released on DVD (with extras) in the UK on 26 September 2006. American DVD release was scheduled for October 2007.
