= Video Nasties: Moral Panic, Censorship & Videotape =

Video Nasties: Moral Panic, Lies & Videotape
- film poster
- Directed by: Jake West
- Written by: Marc Morris
- Produced by: Marc Morris
- Starring: Andy Nyman; Kim Newman; John McVicar; Janus Blythe; Julian Petley; Et al
- Cinematography: Jake West
- Edited by: Jake West
- Music by: Rob Lord
- Production company: Nucleus Films
- Distributed by: Nucleus Films
- Release date: 30 August 2010
- Running time: 72 minutes
- Country: United Kingdom
- Language: English

Video Nasties: Moral Panic, Censorship & Videotape is a 2010 British documentary film about the Video Nasties controversy of the early 1980s. It was premiered at London FrightFest in August 2010 and followed by a panel discussion which included producer Marc Morris and director Jake West of Nucleus Films, professor Martin Barker and film director Tobe Hooper. In 2014 the documentary was followed by Video Nasties: Draconian Days, which covered the period from 1984 to 1989 after the introduction of the Video Recordings Act 1984. The two documentaries have contributed to a greater understanding of the Video Nasties phenomenon, and the box sets include archive material, trailers, and analysis from a range of academics, actors and journalists, including CP Lee, Stephen Thrower, Brad Stevens, Julian Petley, Xavier Mendik, Patricia MacCormack. Allan Bryce, Emily Booth.
