= Nucleus Films =

Nucleus Films is a UK-based independent DVD and Blu-Ray distribution label and private limited company, founded in 2003 by researcher and writer Marc Morris and film director Jake West. The label distributes rare cult films in the horror and erotica genres. They have also produced a range of documentaries and featurettes about the making of films, noted film directors and the fight against censorship.

The label's first titles were Between Your Legs, which premiered at London's FrightFest Film Festival in August 2003, and The Ugliest Woman In The World. Both were released on DVD in the UK in September 2005. In October 2007, Nucleus Films released Grindhouse Trailer Classics, the first of an ongoing series of compilations comprising exploitation film trailers from the 1960s and 1980s. A fifth compilation is planned for release in 2017.

Research by Nucleus Films has contributed to a greater understanding of the Video Nasties phenomenon, with archive and analysis demonstrated in two box sets. In 2010, the company released the acclaimed documentary Video Nasties: Moral Panic, Censorship & Videotape, a documentary about the Video Nasties controversy of the early 1980s. It was premiered at London FrightFest in August 2010 and followed by a panel discussion which included Morris, West, professor Martin Barker and film director Tobe Hooper. The documentary was followed, in 2014 by Video Nasties: Draconian Days, which covered the period from 1984 to 1989 after the introduction of the Video Recordings Act 1984.

Accompanying these two documentaries were trailer compilations Video Nasties: The Definitive Guide (2010) and Video Nasties: The Definitive Guide 2. The Definitive Guide is a compilation of trailers for titles that originally appeared on the Director of Public Prosecution's (DPP) lists of works considered suitable for prosecution under the Obscene Publications Act 1959, along with others that were dropped from the list following acquittals. The Definitive Guide 2 featured the eighty titles which considered suitable for forfeiture and destruction (in front of magistrates) under section 3 of the Obscene Publications Act, 1959. As well as releasing cult films and producing documentaries, Nucleus Films also makes DVD and Blu-Ray extras for various UK labels, including Anchor Bay and Arrow Films, and which includes filmed interviews with UK film critics, broadcasters and writers, including Kim Newman and Alan Jones.

== Releases ==
- Between Your Legs
- Gwendoline
- Death Ship
- Grindhouse Trailer Classics (Trailer compilation, 2007)
- Bloodbath at the House of Death (2008).
- Ghost Story DVD (2009)
- Video Nasties: the Definitive Guide part 1 (2010)
- Cannibal Girls (2011)
- Night of the Bloody Apes (2012)
- Video Nasties: the Definitive Guide part 2 (2014)
- Craze (2016)
- Worst Fears (2016)
- Lost Soul (Blu-ray) (2016)
- The Erotic Rites of Frankenstein (Blu-ray) (2017)
- The Demons (1972 film) (Blu-ray) (2017)
- Lady Frankenstein (1971 film) (Blu-ray restoration) (2018)
- Death Laid an Egg (1968 film) (Blu-ray restoration) (2018)
