= Burlesque (disambiguation) =

Burlesque is a classic musical or theatrical entertainment of parodic humour.

Burlesque may also refer to:

- American burlesque, a form of variety show popular from the 1860s
  - Neo-burlesque, a revival and updating of the traditional American burlesque performance
- Burlesque (play), a 1927 play by George Manker Watters and Arthur Hopkins; adapted into multiple films
- Victorian burlesque, an imitative work that derives humour from an incongruous contrast between style and subject

== Film ==
- Burlesque (2010 American film), starring Christina Aguilera and Cher
- Burlesque (2010 Australian film), a drama film

== Music ==
- Burlesque (Bellowhead album)
- Burlesque (compilation album), a 2007 compilation album of contemporary burlesque and neo-burlesque performers
- Burlesque (soundtrack), a soundtrack album by Cher and Christina Aguilera from the 2010 film of the same name
- Burlesque: Allegro con brio - Presto, the 4th movement of Violin Concerto No. 1 by Dmitri Shostakovich
- Burlesque (song), a 1972 single by Family from the Bandstand album
- Burlesque (stage musical), a musical with a book by Steven Antin, based on the 2010 American film

== See also ==
- Burleske, a composition by Richard Strauss
