= White (upcoming film) =

- Directed by: Jake West
- Written by: Dan Schaffer
- Produced by: Jake West; Crawford Anderson-Dillon; Dominic Burns; Sky Morfopoulos; Yariv Lerner; Kate Beckinsale
- Starring: Carla Woodcock; Kate Beckinsale; Katherine McNamara
- Cinematography: Geo Ivanov
- Production company: Highland Film Group
- Countries: United States; United Kingdom; Bulgaria
- Language: English

White is an upcoming horror film directed by Jake West. It stars Katherine McNamara and Kate Beckinsale.

== Plot ==
A plane crashes into the White Shark Café, a region of ocean filled with sharks. An actress called Willa Harba, who was travelling to a film shoot, is the sole survivor of the crash, struggles to survive with only a satellite phone, with a marine biologist name Sam Swatek trying to offer her help.

== Cast ==
- Carla Woodcock as Willa Harba
- Kate Beckinsale as Barbara
- Katherine McNamara as Sam Swatek
- Roxy Striar

== Production ==
On May 13, 2026, it was announced that Kate Beckinsale had joined the cast, and that Highland Film Group would handle worldwide sales and co-finance the film, and that filming would take place across the US, England, and Bulgaria. Beckinsale is also serving as an executive producer on the project. Carla Woodcock has been cast in the lad role of Willa Harba, and Dan Schaffer wrote the screenplay. Other producers include Crawford Anderson-Dillon, Dominic Burns, Sky Morfopoulos, Yariv Lerner. Roxy Striar has also been confirmed to have joined the cast, and she posted images from the set on socal media after filming started.

The film's co-financer, Highland Production Group, have confirmed that it has entered post-production.
