= List of horror films of the 1990s =

Horror films released in the 1990s are listed in the following articles:

- List of horror films of 1990
- List of horror films of 1991
- List of horror films of 1992
- List of horror films of 1993
- List of horror films of 1994
- List of horror films of 1995
- List of horror films of 1996
- List of horror films of 1997
- List of horror films of 1998
- List of horror films of 1999
