= The Amityville Asylum =

- Film poster
- Directed by: Andrew Jones
- Written by: Andrew Jones
- Produced by: Andrew Jones
- Starring: Sophia Del Pizzo; Sarah Louise Madison; Eileen Daly; Kenton Hall
- Cinematography: Victoria Rodway
- Edited by: Tom Perou
- Music by: J. Andrew Jones
- Production companies: Independent Moving Pictures; North Bank Entertainment; Amityville Asylum Films
- Distributed by: 4Digital Media
- Release date: 3 June 2013 (United Kingdom)
- Running time: 88 minutes
- Country: United Kingdom
- Language: English
- Budget: $20,000

The Amityville Asylum (also known as The Nesting 2: Amityville Asylum) is a 2013 British horror film written and directed by Andrew Jones. It is the eleventh film to be inspired by Jay Anson's 1977 novel The Amityville Horror. Sophia Del Pizzo stars as Lisa Templeton, a young woman who is hired to work as a custodian at High Hopes Psychiatric Hospital, an asylum that was built on the site of a haunted house in Amityville, New York.

== Plot ==
In 1974, a cloaked figure gives Ronald DeFeo Jr. a shotgun, which DeFeo uses to kill all six of his relatives at 112 Ocean Avenue in Amityville, New York. Decades later, the house is torn down and replaced by the High Hopes Psychiatric Hospital, which has just hired a new custodian named Lisa Templeton. Lisa is given a tour of the hospital by the maintenance man, Delaney, and told that she will be responsible for cleaning Ward X, a wing which houses criminally insane murderers like the sexual sadist Jerry Kimble, cannibalistic vigilante Dennis Palmer, occultist Sadie Krenwinkel, and a "Patient X" who is implied to be DeFeo. On her first night working at the hospital, Lisa encounters the ghost of Allison DeFeo, she is reprimanded for reporting this to the incredulous head of security, Hardcastle, and is sexually harassed by an orderly named Pemberton.

Palmer escapes from his cell one night and kills Pemberton before cannibalizing Kimble. He is subsequently tortured with electroshock equipment by Pemberton's fellow orderlies, and when Lisa witnesses this, she is browbeaten into silence by Hardcastle. Lisa researches the history of Amityville and discovers that, back in the 18th century, the Satchem, a Native American cult, settled in the area after being run out of Salem, Massachusetts by Christians. The Satchem believed that making annual sacrifices of six people would result in them being gifted with immortality by a God called the Dark Master. The Satchem were eventually wiped out by a witch hunter named John Underhill and buried in a mass grave on the site of what would later become 112 Ocean Avenue. Krenwinkel is a member of a modern-day cult that has adopted the beliefs of the Satchem.

Lisa learns that Doctor Elliot Mixter, the owner of High Hopes, testified at Krenwinkel's trial; when she brings Mixter evidence that Krenwinkel has somehow acquired occult paraphernalia and access to the internet, he is revealed to be in league with Krenwinkel, and has Lisa unlawfully committed to Ward X. Lisa is broken out of her cell by Delaney while Mixter arms Patient X with a shotgun and sends him on a rampage through High Hopes. Patient X murders Krenwinkel, Palmer, and Hardcastle before going after Lisa and Delaney, who encounter possessed patients (one of whom rips his own face off) and Allison's ghost while trying to flee High Hopes. After Patient X kills Delaney, he is killed by Lisa. Lisa confronts Mixter, who taunts her into attacking him, which results in Lisa being gunned down by the NYPD. The massacre at High Hopes is blamed on Lisa.

A year later, Mixter gives a television interview, during which he cheekily implies that he is now immortal while promoting his book, High Hopes, Broken Dreams.

== Cast ==
- Sophia Del Pizzo as Lisa Templeton
- Lee Bane as Delaney
- Jared Morgan as Doctor Elliot Mixter
- Eileen Daly as Sadie Krenwinkel
- Paul Kelleher as Hardcastle
- Kenton Hall as Pemberton
- Sarah Louise Madison as Allison DeFeo
- Alan Humphreys as Jerry Kimble
- Matthew Batte as Dennis Palmer
- Ina Marie Smith as Nancy Dennison
- Judith Haley as Mrs. Hardesty
- John Andrews as Patient X

== Release ==
The film had a limited theatrical run, and was released on DVD and video on demand, by 4Digital Media in the United Kingdom in 2013. The following year the film was released on DVD and video on demand in North America by Hannover House.

== Reception ==
John Marrone of Bloody Disgusting found The Amityville Asylum to be mediocre at best, offering mild praise to its performances while noting that its violence was anemic and its story was weak, and that all in all it felt like it was "pasted together on the fly with novice experimentation." Horror News was similarly critical of the film, giving it a score of 1/5 while calling it an "under-cooked mess" with "a boring first and second act with a third act that promises far more than it delivers." While Ed Blackadder of INFLUX Magazine was critical of the film's direction and writing and gave it a D grade, he conceded that it was still "somewhat watchable" and "better than most of the micro-budget schlock I sit through." Tex Hula ranked The Amityville Asylum as the fifth best of the twenty-one Amityville films that he reviewed for Ain't It Cool News, and concluded his coverage of it by writing, "Yeah, I kind of liked this one. It was a surprise. It has more effort and ambition than most of the sequels. It has a ballsy ending that I really liked."
