= Sexxx =

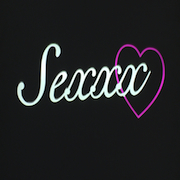
- Country of origin: United Kingdom
- Original language: English

Production
- Running time: 30 minutes

Original release
- Network: Loaded TV
- Release: November 2012 – present

Sexxx is a British comedy television series, which aired on a Tuesday night. The programme was launched on 27 November 2012 and consisted of seven episodes, and was written by Paul Chaplin. The premise of the show is that of a sitcom based in a Soho sex shop run by former porn star Ben Dover as the senior partner, played by Lyndsay Honey, with his best friend 'Pauly', played by Chaplin, as his younger and more naive colleague. The theme is loosely based upon the 1970s Open All Hours BBC comedy series. Sexxx was broadcast on satellite television and online.

== Cast ==
- Lyndsay Honey as Ben Dover
- Paul Chaplin as Pauly Perkins
- Lyna Korenell as Katia Radek
- Anne Marie Davies as Liza Baker
- Eileen Daly as Miss Kitty
- Grant Huggair as Jez Butcher
- Emma Burdett as Julia Myers
- Nick Orchard as Inspector Trent
- Dean Kilbey as Toby Jackson

== Episodes ==
No.	Title	Directed by	Written by	Original release date
1	"Open"	Unknown	Paul Chaplin	27 November 2012
2	"Model"	Unknown	Paul Chaplin	4 December 2012
3	"Booth"	Unknown	Paul Chaplin	11 December 2012
4	"Vigil"	Unknown	Paul Chaplin	13 December 2012
5	"Pink"	Unknown	Paul Chaplin	18 December 2012
6	"Show"	Unknown	Paul Chaplin	20 December 2012
