= Marc Morris (producer) =

Marc Morris is a documentary producer, archivist, and researcher. He is a director of Nucleus Films, a film distribution company which he runs with film maker Jake West. A recognised authority on exploitation cinema, Morris has been credited with 'an encyclopedic knowledge of grindhouse and sleaze' whose collection of films, posters and trailers 'should be enshrined as some sort of national archive.'. He has written and produced two documentaries on the 'video nasties' phenomenon and, for Nucleus Films, curates the DVD series Grindhouse Trailer Classics. His feature-length documentary Video Nasties: Moral Panic, Censorship & Videotape was released in 2010, with a sequel, Video Nasties: Draconian Days in 2014. Both were premiered at FrightFest and are often used as reference works for university film studies on British movie censorship.

== Biography ==
Morris started as production manager at Redemption Films in the early 1990s. In 1997 he established the Mondo Erotico website, dedicated to the films of Radley Metzger, Walerian Borowczyk and Jean Rollin. The website was instrumental in locating two lost Jesús Franco movies (Eugenie de Sade and Eugenie… The Story of Her Journey into Perversion). He has worked as a consultant and researcher for Anchor Bay, Channel 5 and Arrow Films and directed music videos for Rise Above Records bands Uncle Acid and the Deadbeats and With the Dead.

== Filmography (as producer) ==
- Phantasmagoria (2005)
- Stormy Seas: the Voyage from Bloodstar to Death Ship (2007)
- Grindhouse Trailer Classics (2007)
- Ghost Stories: the Curious Tales of the Making of Ghost Story (2009)
- Video Nasties: Moral Panic, Censorship & Videotape (2010)
- Video Nasties: the Definitive Guide ( 2010)
- Video Nasties: the Definitive Guide Part 2 ( 2014)
- Video Nasties: Draconian Days (2014)
- House of Cards (2015)
- Soundtrack Hell: the story of the abandoned Coil score (2015)
- Being Frank: Sean Chapman on Hellraiser (2015)
- Fifty Shades of Erotica (2015)
- Alan's Ashes: A Personal Reflection on the Making of Angela's Ashes (2016)
- D.O.A. - A Punk Post Mortem (2018)

== Bibliography ==
- The Art of Nasty, Salvation Films, 1998 - ISBN 0-9534549-0-8
- The Art of Nasty, FAB Press, 2009 - ISBN 978-1-903254-57-8
- Shock Horror: Astounding Artwork from the Video Nasty Era , FAB Press, 2009 - ISBN 1-903254-32-9

== Links ==
- Marc Morris at IMDb
- "Films That Were Buried Alive", The Guardian, 22 August, 2008
- "Ban This Sick Filth" (interview-with Marc Morris and Jake West), Electric Sheep magazine, 17 July 2014
- The Official Nucleus Films website
