= Richard Driscoll =

British actor and director

- Born: 13 January 1960 (age 66); Cardiff, Wales, United Kingdom
- Other names: Steven Craine; Chris Newman
- Occupations: Producer; Director; Actor; Screenwriter; Editor; Sound Department
- Years active: 1981–present

Richard Driscoll (born 13 January 1960) is a British screenwriter, film producer, actor, film director, and convicted criminal.

Driscoll was born in Cardiff, and uses the professional name Steven Craine, to avoid confusion with Richard Driscoll, another British actor.

== Eldorado ==
Eldorado (2012), which starred Daryl Hannah, David Carradine and Michael Madsen, was filmed mostly at Higher Nanpean Farm in Cornwall, a small production facility owned by Driscoll. However, scenes involving Hannah were shot in Los Angeles. During production, Madsen was hospitalised after an incident while intoxicated. The film was released in 2012.

== Return of the Living Dead sequel controversy ==
In 2024, Driscoll teamed with ROTLD Originals LLC - a group of actors from The Return of the Living Dead (1985) - to make a sequel titled Trash's Revenge. The film was promoted as a live-action narrative feature and raised over £75,000 from backers on Driscoll's CineBacker website. While several live-action scenes were shot, Driscoll eventually stopped giving updates about the project. In October 2026, Driscoll's company DragonFlix announced the Trash's Revenge project was now a documentary about Linnea Quigley. The proposed sequel was released as Return of the Living Dead: Aftermath and made heavy use of generative A.I. technology. Both Quigley and fellow cast member Beverly Randolph denounced the project, stating they were deceived by Driscoll and "this is not what we signed up for."

== Legal history ==
=== Tax fraud conviction ===
Once Eldorado was released, HM Revenue and Customs began an investigation into Driscoll and the production accounting of the film. Driscoll had greatly inflated the budget of the film to claim VAT refunds on money the production had not spent. The entire budget of the film was reported by Driscoll to be £12 million but the subsequent investigation revealed it had only cost £750,000. False invoices were created to give the impression that Carradine was paid more than £400,000 for 13 days' filming, even though he had died two weeks earlier than the filming dates stated. Other false invoices claimed Hannah was purportedly paid £575,000 for seven days' shooting at and travel to Driscoll's studio in Cornwall, even though all of her scenes were shot in Los Angeles. Another showed Rik Mayall received £44,350 for four days' filming when his fee was actually £6,000 for two days.

In June 2013, Driscoll was found guilty of a £1.5 million VAT fraud involving inflating the values of invoices for projects including Eldorado and two other films - Watchmen of Hellgate and Back2Hell - but he was acquitted of conspiring to claim more than £2 million in film tax credit subsidies for Eldorado. He was subsequently jailed for three years. Since his release, he has continued to write, act and direct with Ross Fall and his MAHA Films Label. Driscoll has worked under the pseudonyms Steven Craine and Chris Newman.

== Filmography ==
=== Director ===
- The Comic (1985) (+ screenplay)
- Silent Heroes (1988) (+ screenplay)
- Kannibal (2001) (+ screenplay)
- Evil Calls: The Raven (2008) (+ screenplay)
- Eldorado (2012) (+ screenplay)
- Grindhouse 2wo (2016) (+ screenplay)
- Grindhouse Nightmare (2017)
- Assassins Revenge (2018) (+ screenplay)
- Born2Race (2019) (+ screenplay)
- Conjuring: The Book of the Dead (2020) (+ screenplay)
- Doctor Sleepless (2020)
- A2Z the History of the Beatles (2021)
- Necronomicon (2023)
- HEAT deux L.A. Takedown (2023)
- Buckle Up (2023)
- Baba Yaga (2024)
- Once Upon a Time in Hollyweird (2024)
- The Adventures of Mickey Sherlock Mouse and Winnie the Pooh (2024)
- Return of the Living Dead: Aftermath (2026)
- Trash's Revenge: The Linnea Quigley Story (2026)

=== Actor ===
- The Life and Times of David Lloyd George (TV series, 1 episode) (1981) – Lord Askwith
- It Ain't Half Hot Mum (TV series, 1 episode) (1981) – Private Jones
- Star Wars: Episode VI – Return of the Jedi (1983) – Unidentified X-wing pilot
- Jamaica Inn (1983) (TV film) – Sedgewick
- The Mimosa Boys (1984) (TV film) – Griffin
- The Master of Ballantrae (1984) (TV film) – McGregor
- The District Nurse (TV series, 3 episodes) (1984) – John Morris
- La Guerre de Jenny (1985) (TV film) – Stanson
- EastEnders (TV series) (1997-1999) – Alex Healy
- Kannibal (2001) – Quinn/Kavanagh/Virgil
- Evil Calls (2008) – George Carney
- Eldorado (2012) – Oliver Rosenblum
- Assassins Revenge (2018) – The Comedian / William Bard
