= The Eternal (film) =

1998 American horror film

- DVD cover with the alternative title The Eternal: Kiss of the Mummy
- Directed by: Michael Almereyda
- Written by: Michael Almareyda
- Produced by: Mark Amin; David L. Bushell
- Starring: Alison Elliott; Jared Harris; Christopher Walken
- Cinematography: Jim Denault
- Edited by: Tracy Granger; Steve Hamilton
- Music by: Simon Fisher-Turner
- Distributed by: Trimark Pictures
- Release date: September 18, 1998 (TIFF)
- Running time: 95 minutes
- Country: United States
- Language: English

Trance, (also released as The Eternal), is a 1998 American horror film directed and written by Michael Almereyda and starring Alison Elliott, Jared Harris, and Christopher Walken. The film's score features music by Mark Geary. It premiered at the Toronto International Film Festival, and was released as direct-to-video in the United States.

== Plot ==
Nora and Jim are an alcoholic couple. After a night of drinking, Nora experiences a flashback and falls down the stairs of their New York apartment building. Though all right, she complains of headaches, and her doctor orders her to give up alcohol. For the sake of their son Jimmy, Nora and Jim pledge to sober up, but the doctor expresses skepticism when he learns they will be traveling to Ireland to visit Nora's elderly grandmother. Nora assures her doctor they will purge themselves of all their bad habits there.

In Ireland, Nora and Jim stop at a pub to get directions. While drinking, they run into Joe, one of Nora's old friends. He warns them that Nora's Uncle Bill has gone insane. Jim becomes jealous and starts a fight with Joe, and they are thrown out of the pub. Before they reach the mansion, Nora has another vision and crashes the car. Though none of them are injured, they are forced to walk the rest of the way. Alice, a young girl adopted by Bill, leads them there.

When Bill offers them drinks, Jim declines, much to Nora's annoyance. Bill reveals himself to be blind. After Jim makes several insensitive remarks, Nora takes Jim aside, accuses him of being drunk, and searches his clothes for a hidden flask. Though Nora is angry when she finds it is empty, Jim says they will restart their sobriety anew together. Bill suggests that Nora meet her grandmother alone, but she is confused and briefly becomes ill when he leads her to the basement. There, he reveals a preserved bog body, which he explains is a Druid witch named Niamh. Meanwhile, Jim encounters Nora's grandmother, who attacks him and wanders off. When Bill describes his belief that Niamh will come back to life, Nora returns upstairs, though she is surprised to see Niamh apparently open her eyes.

Nora tells Jim that they should leave the next day, as Joe was right about Bill. Concerned for their safety amid crazy relatives, Jim and Nora move Jimmy into their room. When they lie down, they discover Druidic relics hidden under their mattress. Bill and Alice look for Nora's grandmother and lead her back to her bedroom. When Bill returns to the basement, Niamh, now a lookalike of Nora, comes to life. After Bill kisses her, Niamh slits his throat, decapitates him, and goes upstairs. At the same time, Nora's behavior becomes erratic, and she tells Jim that she left Ireland for America after having an abortion.

Jim goes downstairs to drink, where he eventually encounters Niamh. Mistaking her for Nora, Jim kisses her. When he becomes uncomfortable with the idea of public sex, they stop and he lights cigarettes for them both. She accidentally sets her robe on fire, and runs outside. Jim follows, only to run into Joe. They argue, and Joe knocks him out. Joe enters the house and seduces Nora. Jim finds them, and Nora hits him as he attempts to pull her away from Joe. Then Niamh comes back inside, and seeing both Nora and Niamh, Jim becomes confused. When Niamh attacks them, the gardener, Sean, saves them by shooting Niamh. When she revives and kills Joe, they retreat to the kitchen, where they electrocute her, and her burning body falls through the floor. Alice explains that Niamh intends to steal Nora's body and soul. When Jimmy stands too close to the hole, Niamh grabs him. Nora jumps through the hole, and the others race downstairs.

Nora encounters her grandmother, who upon hearing that Nora is willing to sacrifice herself to save Jimmy, encourages her to do so. Nora and Niamh begin showing shared personalities. Noticing this, Jim uses Nora's alcoholism to keep Niamh occupied. Niamh eventually flees outside with Jimmy, where Nora confronts her. Remembering her grandmother's advice, Nora slits her throat and jumps into the ocean, as Niamh watches. When Jim arrives, Niamh says that everything is alright, as Nora has purged herself of the Druid's influence and taken over Niamh's body. Niamh – now Nora – and Jim embrace, and Alice says that Nora has finally shed herself of her fears and weaknesses.

== Cast ==
- Alison Elliott as Nora / Niamh
  - Raina Feig as Young Nora
- Rachel O'Rourke as Alice
- Jared Harris as Jim
- Jeffrey Goldschrafe as Jim Jr.
- Christopher Walken as Uncle Bill Ferriter
- Lois Smith as Mrs. Ferriter
- Sinead Dolan as Nora's mother
- Jason Miller as The Doctor
- Paul Ferriter as Joe
- David Geary as Nora's Father

== Production ==
Shooting took place in Yonkers, New York.

== Release ==
The film premiered as Trance at the Toronto International Film Festival. Released as The Eternal, the film went direct-to-video in the United States in July 1999. It had previously been titled The Mummy, but it was retitled to Trance when it clashed with the Stephen Sommers film of the same name.

== Reception ==
=== Critical reception ===
Rotten Tomatoes, a review aggregator, reports that 33% of nine surveyed critics gave the film a positive review; the average rating is 5.2/10. Gary Morris of Bright Lights Film Journal wrote, "The Eternal's mood-drenched Irish coastal landscape and unsettling sense that these are real people trapped in an unreal, terrifying world make it well worth the watch." Keith Phipps of The A.V. Club wrote, "It may be more thoughtful, less derivative, and ultimately more interesting than this year's other Mummy, but it still feels half-baked." Robert Pardi of TV Guide rated it two out of four stars and wrote, "Unfortunately, its excessive artiness undermines the laudable effort to make character more important than blood and guts." Ken W. Hanley of Fangoria wrote, "Almereyda's take on independent witchcraft horror boasts commendable imagery, wonderful supernatural moments and admirably gonzo acting choices, placing an abstract perspective on a subgenre that is otherwise clouded in Gothic inspiration." In The Mummy in Fact, Fiction and Film, Susan D. Cowie and Tom Johnson called it "a disjointed opus that is quite hard to follow". The TLA Video rated it two out of four stars, calling it "a moderately interesting mishmash" with "murky presentation and vague 'scares'," despite some comic moments by actor Christopher Walken.

=== Awards ===
Sitges - Catalan International Film Festival
Year	Nomination	Result	Category
1998	Jared Harris	Won	Best Actor
1998	Michael Almereyda	Nominated	Best Film

== See also ==
- List of horror films:1990s
