= The Dark Side (magazine) =

British horror cinema magazine

- Issue 179 cover, 2016
- Editor: Allan Bryce
- Categories: Horror fiction
- Frequency: Bi-monthly
- Publisher: Ghoulish Publishing
- First issue: 1990
- Country: United Kingdom
- Language: English
- Website: thedarksidemagazine.com
- ISSN: 0960-6653
- OCLC: 500038477

The Dark Side is a UK magazine covering the field of horror cinema. Published every four weeks, it covers new releases and features interviews with directors and actors. It was established in 1990 and has been edited throughout its run by Allan Bryce.

== History ==
Launched in 1990, it has been edited throughout its run by Allan Bryce. Originally owned by part of Robert Maxwell's publishing empire, it was later bought by Stray Cat, in which Bryce was a partner.

The original 1st 12 issues of the magazine were designed by Jeff Gurney - Designer and Art editor, who came up with the original layout and design concept, headers and title logo of the magazine which was hand drawn and is still used today. Jeff Gurney stopped designing the magazine after the Maxwell company was dissolved after Maxwell's death. It was sold and handed over to Allan Bryce of Stray Cat with help and instruction from Jeff Gurney of the design, to help keep the magazine going in its same format.

The magazine ceased publication in September 2009, but was re-launched under Ghoulish Publishing a year and a half later, going on sale on a bi-monthly basis from 21 April 2011, the first issue being dated May/June 2011.

In November 2012, Ghoulish Publishing launched Dark Side Digital, a bi-monthly online subscription magazine which alternated each month with the print edition found on shelves. The Dark Side is available in the UK and abroad, and as of issue 166 the print magazine was available every six weeks and a digital edition is available simultaneously at the magazine's website.

As of May 13, 2021 The Dark Side and its sister publication Infinity, a cult sci-fi/TV magazine, began being published every four-weeks.

== Writers ==
At the time it suspended publication, The Dark Side's regular contributors included John Martin, Calum Waddell, Alan Jones, Eileen Daly, Jason Slater, Jonathan Sothcott and Brad Stevens. Past writers include Stan Nicholls, Steve Green, John Brosnan, Barry Hurford and David Kerekes. Since its relaunch it has also taken on Simon Hooper (who is also the Deputy Editor of film website www.AnyGoodFilms.com) , Denis Meikle and many more genre experts; Green, Martin and Waddell have also contributed to the new series.

== Other activities ==
It also has a DVD and book imprint. Releases include a reissue of John Martin's study of the "video nasty" phenomenon, The Seduction of the Gullible.

=== Infinity ===
Infinity, is a cult TV and retro magazine from the publishers of The Dark Side which was first published in 2017. Infinity is focused on a slightly later period of TV and youth culture than Yours Retro, with many of the articles being about television shows of the 60s, 70s and 80s. In this regard it is similar to SFX magazine's Cult TV Magazine spin-off from the mid-1990s, though Infinity also has features on films like Indiana Jones and toys like Dinky cars in addition to articles about Crackerjack, The Green Hornet and Hawaii Five-O.

== See also ==
- SFX – British sci-fi and fantasy media magazine
- Starburst – British science fiction, fantasy, and horror entertainment magazine
