= Georgina Baillie =

English entertainer (born 1985)

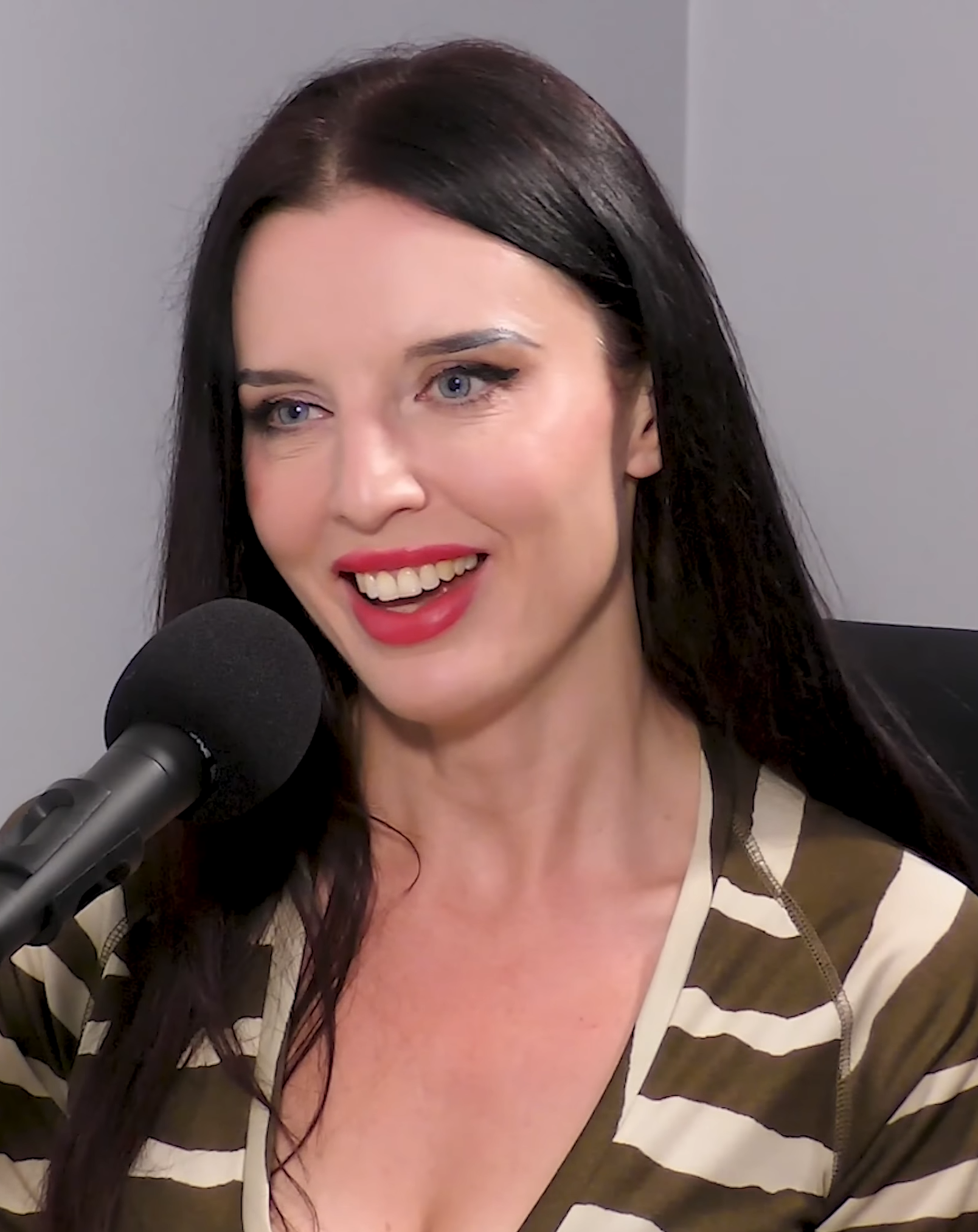
- Baillie in 2023
- Born: 7 July 1985 (age 41)
- Citizenship: British
- Education: The Poor School and Workhouse Theatre drama school
- Occupations: Singer; songwriter; actress; burlesque performer
- Known for: Poussez Posse, Adam Ant
- Style: Post-punk, gothic burlesque
- Parents: Charles Baillie (father); Kate Sachs (mother)
- Relatives: Andrew Sachs (grandfather)
- Website: georginabaillieart.com

Georgina Baillie (born 7 July 1985) is an English actress, artist, post-punk singer, songwriter, and former burlesque performer. Her stage names have included Voluptua and Georgie Girl.

From 2010 to 2013 she worked as a backing vocalist for Adam Ant and during 2011–2012 as the lead singer of the band Georgie Girl and her Poussez Posse that toured with Ant in over 100 concerts.

In October 2008, Baillie and her grandfather, the actor Andrew Sachs, were the targets of a prank phone call by Russell Brand and Jonathan Ross that resulted in reverberations in the British media.

== Early life ==
Baillie was born 7 July 1985 in east London. Her mother is voiceover artist Kate Sachs and her father the actor Charles Baillie. Her maternal grandfather was the actor Andrew Sachs.

== Career ==
=== Music ===
Baillie has worked with a number of bands over the years. In 2010, she worked with MariaMaria to release a single, "Sonnet for a Vampire." Baillie performed vocals, with Sarah White on bass and Corrine Aze "Hazel" Corleone on guitar.

In 2009, shortly after The Russell Brand Show prank calls, Adam Ant befriended Baillie, and as of 2011 they remained close friends. He hired Baillie to oversee his calendar scheduling and asked her to perform back up vocals for his performances. This lasted from 2010–2013. At first she sang with White and later with Georgina "Twinkle" Leahy; she later sang backup alone. As a member of Ant's band "The Good, The Mad and the Lovely Posse", she appeared as a backing vocalist in Ant's "Cool Zombie" music video, released on Blueblack Hussar Records and in concert footage featured in The Blueblack Hussar, a documentary about Ant's early 2010s musical comeback directed by Jack Bond, as well as in extras included on the film's DVD release.

Baillie co-wrote two songs in response to the Jonathan Ross/Russell Brand incident discussed below. One was "Gun In Your Pocket", a song by Ant with input from Baillie in which both Baillie and Brand are discussed. "Gun In Your Pocket" was written in 2010 as single for Ant's upcoming album Adam Ant Is the Blueblack Hussar in Marrying the Gunner's Daughter. In the end the song was released in late 2012 as the B side of the pre-album single "Cool Zombie". The other song was "Rubber Medusa" – a song addressed to Brand from Baillie's point of view, co-written with Ant.

From 2011 to 2012, Baillie was lead singer of the band Georgie Girl And Her Poussez Posse, which Ant mentored. There were two incarnations of Poussez Posse. The original line-up featured Baillie with Fiona Bevan and Danie Cox both on guitars, Rachael Smith on drums and Molly Spiers-MacLeod on bass. Footage from early 2011 of a band meeting of this first incarnation at Ant's home is included in Bond's documentary. In 2011 Bevan left to concentrate on her own music, and Cox, Smith and Spiers-MacLeod left to found The Featherz.

A second incarnation of the Posse featured Corleone on guitar, drummer Jessica Rushton and future Curse of Lono bassist Charis Anderson. This version toured the UK, mainland Europe and Australia supporting Ant and his band between October 2011 and December 2012, with Baillie performing double duty every night as both the Posse's frontwoman and Ant's backing vocalist.

Early in 2013, Baillie dissolved the second Posse. She sang vocals and Corleone played guitar as the duo Vortex Empress. They produced two tracks, "Burn Me" and "Spellbound" and a music video for the former. From mid to late 2013, she sang backing vocals in Guns 2 Roses, (the official Guns 'N Roses tribute act). In 2016, she worked with Boz Boorer singing vocals on the track "Le Stalker" on Boorer's solo album Age of Boom.

John Robb of Louder Than War, in a full interview for the site, described Baillie's work as "punky burlesque". The Evening Standard of London has profiled her music career and musical collaboration and friendship with Ant. The Tampa Bay Times describes Georgie Girl & Her Poussez Posse's music as "fresh and rough", comparing their sound to "Hole vs Garbage vs a sexy, roller-derby squad".

=== Burlesque ===
Baillie has worked in burlesque, some of her collaborators and projects include: Salvation Group, and Satanic Sluts Extreme, a four piece "gothic burlesque" dance group originating as an offshoot of the online subculture "Satanic sluts" organised by Nigel Wingrove; her persona's stage name was Voluptua. Self-described as: "four of the sexiest depraved London jezebels", they performed at Glastonbury music festival and in several music videos.

=== Acting ===
As well as showing her as backing vocalist and apprentice to Ant, her appearance in Jack Bond's documentary The Blueblack Hussar also features her life at Ant's house in early 2011 and her accompanying Ant as he goes about his comeback, including being in the studio for an early 2011 Xfm radio session.

After she stopped working with Ant, Baillie studied acting at The Poor School of drama in London in the mid 2010s. In 2021, she was cast in the lead role in a production of the 1975 Barry Reckord play, White Witch, at the Bloomsbury Theatre. Also in 2021, she appeared in the Kevin Short film, Tom and his Zombie Wife.

=== Art ===
Baillie began producing cartoon-like drawings in 2017 as part of rehabilitation. Later she began painting and producing silkscreen prints. An exhibition of her art was to be held at held at the Sanctum Hotel in Soho, London on September 19, 2025 as part of an event to promote Rusty Egan's new album Romantic. from which the single "Midnight Peepshow" featured Baillie on the cover art.

=== Podcasting ===
In 2024, she created the podcast "HOPE: Hearing Other People's Experiences" in which she discussed her experience with addiction with guests including Chantelle Lewis, Gillian Shorter, Tati Silva, Alexe, Pax, Christine Lynn Cant, Chris Beradi and Will Ogden.

== 2008 prank call incident ==
During the 18 October 2008 episode of BBC Radio 2's The Russell Brand Show, comedian Russell Brand and presenter Jonathan Ross called actor Andrew Sachs (Baillie's grandfather) live on air for an interview. When Sachs failed to take the call, Ross and Brand left a series of four "lewd" messages on Sachs' answering machine about Baillie's sexual relationship with Brand. The incident was picked up by the tabloids, and later resulted in Brand and Radio 2 controller Lesley Douglas resigning from the BBC, Ross being suspended without pay for twelve weeks, and the BBC being fined £150,000 by Ofcom.

The media referred to the incident as "Sachsgate". Sachs never gave his consent to have these messages broadcast on the air. This led to the estrangement of Baillie from her grandparents that lasted for years. The sociologist Chris Rojeck described Ross and Brand's exploit as an "invasion of privacy", and stated that "their remorse is not focused on Andrew Sachs or Georgina Baillie, the victims whose privacy has been violated" but rather the two comedians felt remorse for receiving negative public reactions and disapproval of their stunt.

Baillie stated in The New York Times that she thought Brand was "very much rewarded" for the prank. The prank calls were covered in the news again in 2023 in the wake of a Sunday Times–Channel 4 investigation into Brand's alleged sexual assaults of other women.

== See also ==
- Women in punk rock
