= Eldorado (2012 film) =

- Film poster
- Directed by: Richard Driscoll
- Written by: Richard Driscoll
- Produced by: Keith Howell
- Starring: Daryl Hannah; Brigitte Nielsen; David Carradine; Michael Madsen; Steve Guttenberg; Jeff Fahey; Patrick Bergin; Bill Moseley; Sylvester McCoy; Tyrese Gibson; Rik Mayall; Kerry Washington
- Narrated by: Peter O'Toole
- Cinematography: Francois Coppey
- Edited by: Robert James
- Music by: Buster Bloodvessel; Howie Casey; Tim Renwick
- Distributed by: Sole Worldwide Rights Breakdown Films Ltd
- Release date: 30 January 2012
- Country: United Kingdom
- Language: English
- Budget: $3.85 million

Eldorado is a British horror-comedy film written and directed by Richard Driscoll, and starring Brigitte Nielsen and Daryl Hannah along with David Carradine, Michael Madsen, Kerry Washington, Jeff Fahey, Steve Guttenberg, Bill Moseley, Sylvester McCoy, Tyrese Gibson and Peter O'Toole. The film has been described as a horror/comedy/musical road movie. The film was also released under the title Highway to Hell.

== Cast ==
- Brigitte Nielsen as Angel
- Daryl Hannah as The Stranger
- David Carradine as The Spirit Guide
- Darren Morgan as Stan Rosenblum
- Richard Driscoll as Ollie Rosenblum
- Peter O'Toole as The Narrator
- Jeff Fahey as "Doc" Martin
- Michael Madsen as Ted
- Patrick Bergin as Roy
- Steve Guttenberg as J.J.
- Kerry Washington as Tamara
- Rik Mayall as Chef Mario
- Sylvester McCoy as General Zwick
- Caroline Munro as Lilly
- Robin Askwith as Mick
- Tyrese Gibson as David
- Bill Moseley as Lemma
- Robert Llewellyn as "Meat"
- Buster Bloodvessel as Sheriff

== Release ==
The film was to receive a wide release in both the UK and in the USA in November 2010; however, though production was complete, it was not released.

On 5 June 2013, it was reported in the British media that the director had funded the film by filing false VAT tax returns to the British government. Driscoll was alleged to have falsely claimed the movie's budget to be $15 million; the figure was actually only $1.5 million, and this was boosted by a further $2.35 million defrauded from HMRC. He was convicted at Southwark Crown Court, and sentenced to three years imprisonment.

The film never received a theatrical release but was released direct-to-video in the United Kingdom.
