= Bad Habits (2009 film) =

- Theatrical release poster
- Directed by: Dominic Deacon
- Written by: Dominic Deacon
- Produced by: Anna Young
- Starring: Sandra Casa; London Gabraelle; Haydn Evans; Mat Wearing; Peter Paltos; John Jamison; Robert Urban; Andrew J. Phillips; Cris Deacon; Lachlan Stephen; Andrew Ingles
- Cinematography: Marcus Dineen
- Edited by: Dominic Deacon
- Music by: Evan "Moxie" Kitchener
- Production company: Dank Films
- Release date: 2009
- Running time: 84 min
- Country: Australia
- Language: English

Bad Habits is a 2009 Australian Nunsploitation film directed and written by Dominic Deacon as his feature debut, starring Sandra Casa and London Gabraelle.

The film had its premiere at the Melbourne Underground Film Festival in 2009 and won Best Screenplay and Best Female Actress. The film also won Best Australian Feature Film at the Sexy International Film Festival.

== Plot ==
Sister Marie Fenche is a woman on the verge of collapse. Unable to distinguish reality from fantasy, Marie's life is thrown into turmoil when she awakens one morning, alone in a room with a corpse in the bathtub. The truth is not even Marie knows for sure. Marie's only grounding in this confused world is Jamie, an innocent young nun who is both equally enamored and repulsed by her. Jamie can only help so much, however, and Marie's world comes crashing down when she encounters a mysterious stranger who triggers dark and dangerous memories. Unable to sleep and addled by pills Marie releases her final grip on reality as her dementia leads her deeper and deeper into a world of violence, sex and drugs.

== Cast ==
- Sandra Casa as Siser Marie Fenche, a woman on the verge of collapse, barely able to distinguish reality from fantasy
- London Gabraelle as Jamie, Marie's only friend in a dark world
- Haydn Evans as Michael
- Mat Wearing as Bishop / Andrew / Adam
- John Jamison as Kiki
- Robert Urban as Officer MacMillan
- Andrew J. Phillips as Officer Davis
- Peter Paltos as Fifi

== Soundtrack ==
The soundtrack was the first collaboration with the directors long standing composer Evan "Moxie" Kitchener. Their other features are Only The Young Die Good and Burlesque. The score has been described as tense and quite haunting.

== Reception ==
Bad Habits has received mostly positive reviews upon its release.

Digital-retribution gave it 4 out of 5 saying, "Clever, gruesome, grotesque and all wrapped up in a gloriously slimy coat of sleaze, Bad Habits shows that its writer/director Dominic Deacon, and his crew who acquit themselves admirably, is a name to look out for. Next film please folks!".

Severed Cinema's Ray Casta gave 3 and a half stars (out of five) and said, "The film is also erotic and psychosexual, but it never once succumbs to exploitation. A nice touch are the homage's to 1970's Italian cinema which are plentiful. Dominic Deacon's "Bad Habits" is a naughty, Giallo-inspired head-trip that takes the viewer on a dark journey where nothing is what it seems".

Scaryminds.com gave it a perfect 10 out of 10 and said, "One of the best movies I've seen all year, full recommendation to anyone who loves them some quality cinema. Bad Habits will provide the fix true movie fans have been waiting on all year".
