= OutTHERE =

outTHERE
- Presented by: Anneka Svenska; Emily Booth
- No. of series: 3

Original release
- Network: Five
- Release: 2001 – 2003

outTHERE is a cult half-hour show which ran between 2001 and 2003 on Five and Bravo. It was fronted by presenter Anneka Svenska for series one and two, and by Emily Booth in series three, in the alter-ego guise 'Eden'. The show featured clips from various non-mainstream films, videos and television programmes covering genres such as kung-fu, anime, cult, horror, pornography and international B movies.
