= Jennifer Evans =

Welsh actress

- Born: 26 November 1982 (age 43); Cardiff, South Glamorgan, Wales

Jennifer Evans (born 26 November 1982) is a Welsh actress, best known for playing the lead role of estranged Welsh farm girl Cat Williams in the 2005 award-winning (BIFA Raindance Award) horror/comedy feature film Evil Aliens.

She also works as a portrait photographer, based in London.

== Filmography ==
Year	Title	Role	Notes
2004	Meet the Quizzies	Tracey	advert
2005	Spoof Labour Party political broadcast		TV
2005	Deep Vain	Tara	
2005	Evil Aliens	Cat	
2006	Mad On Her	Kerry	
2007	Rise of the Footsoldier	Lorraine Rolfe	
