= Pervirella (soundtrack) =

Pervirella: Original Motion Picture Soundtrack

Soundtrack album by François Evans (composer, conductor)
- Released: 23 February 1999
- Recorded: Toe Rag Studios; London
- Genre: Jazz, surf rock, garage rock, lounge, easy listening, psychedelic rock
- Label: Dionysus Records
- Producer: Liam Watson; Bruce Brand; Ed Deegan; Josh Collins; François Evans

Pervirella Original Motion Picture Soundtrack and Other Exotic Entertainment Tunes is the Soundtrack for the film Pervirella.

== History ==
The rock and roll-Victorian-erotic-horror-soundtrack featured composition from jazz, surf rock, garage rock, lounge, easy listening and psychedelic rock.

== Track listing ==
1. Alessandro Alessandroni - Desert Theme
2. François Evans & London Gay Symphony Orchestra - Pervirella Main Title
3. Les Hommes Qui Adorent Les Femmes - Sexy Amazonas
4. François Evans & London Gay Symphony Orchestra - Journey to Oshimina
5. François Evans & London Gay Symphony Orchestra - Museum of Curiosities
6. François Evans & London Gay Symphony Orchestra - Amicus Reilly
7. François Evans & London Gay Symphony Orchestra - Airship Departs
8. François Evans & London Gay Symphony Orchestra - Baby Grows/The Magic Carpet Ride
9. The Diaboliks - Ninja a Go Go
10. Dave Kraft Five - Lavinina's Theme
11. Frat Shack All-Stars - Let's All Go to the Frat Shack
12. Frat Shack All-Stars - Mad Juicer
13. Frat Shack All-Stars - Buggered Bunny
14. The Adventures of Parsley - The Flying Car
15. The Constellations - Rumpy Pumpy
16. Baine Watson Orchestra - Dog Gas
17. Toe Rag All-Stars with Dave Kraft - Lavinia's Theme
18. Sexton Ming and the Diamond Gussetts - The Sake of Pleasure
19. Bradley Ghoulstein Combo - Bottles of Blood
20. Bradley Ghoulstein Combo - Jungle Stitches
21. Bradley Ghoulstein Combo - Put It On
22. François Evans & The London Gay Symphony Orchestra - Pervirella End Title

== Release ==
It was released on 23 February 1999 over Dionysus Records and was recorded at Toe Rag Studios in London.

== Credits ==
- Distributor: Lumberjack-Mordam Music Group
- Recording information: Toe Rag Studios, London, England
- Editors: Len Horowitz and Lee Joseph at HRS Beverly Hills, CA
- Music composed and conducted by François Evans
- Manufactured under license from Josh Collins and Exotic Entertainment UK
- Arrangers: Josh Collins, Liam Watson, Bruce Brand
