= Christopher Adamson =

British actor

- Born: Christopher John Adamson; 19 October 1949
- Died: 17 June 2025
- Other name: Chris Adamson
- Occupation: Actor
- Years active: 1990–2023

Christopher Adamson was a British actor. He often portrayed villains, such as Mean Machine Angel in Judge Dredd and Jimmy Legs in Pirates of the Caribbean: Dead Man's Chest and Pirates of the Caribbean: At World's End. He attended Webber Douglas Academy of Dramatic Art.

== Filmography ==
Film
Year	Title	Role	Notes
1990	Bullseye!	Death's head	
1991	Eye Contact	Optician	Television film
1991	Robin Hood: Prince of Thieves	Soldier	
1991	Edward II	Thug	
1992	Fool's Gold: The Story of Brink's-Mat Robbery	Winchester Warder	Television film
1993	The Young Americans	Billy Cohen	
1993	Dirty Weekend	Serial killer	
1993	The Three Musketeers	Henri	
1993	The Magician	Radio operator	Television film
1994	Beyond Bedlam	Weasel	
1994	Beg!	Detective Jarvis	
1995	The Milkman	Robber	Short film
1995	Mad Dogs and Englishmen	Max Quinlan	
1995	Judge Dredd	Mean Machine	
1995	Cutthroat Island	Dawg's Pirate	
1995	Club Death	Afterlife Corp. Magus	
1995	It Might Be You	Shady	
1997	The Fifth Element	Airport Cop	
1998	Les Misérables	Bertin	
1998	La vuelta de El Coyote	Walker	
1998	Razor Blade Smile	Sir Sethane Blake	
1999	Lighthouse	Leo Rook	
1999	Sacred Flesh	Father Peter	
2001	Goodbye, Mr Steadman	Skating mugger	Television film
2002	The Count of Monte Cristo	Maurice	
2002	Whacked	Hitman "Lenny"	Short film
2003	The Last Horror Movie	Killer	
2004	Sanhedrin	Mr. Grunwald	Short film
2004	Bridget Jones: The Edge of Reason	Background extra	
2005	Evil Aliens	Llyr Williams	
2005	Mangal Pandey: The Rising	Anson	
2006	Pirates of the Caribbean: Dead Man's Chest	Jimmy Legs (Dutchman)	
2006	Orange People	The grey man	Short film
2007	Freakshow	Lon	
2007	Pirates of the Caribbean: At World's End	Jimmy Legs (Dutchman)	
2008	Allan Quatermain and the Temple of Skulls	Anisley Hartford	
2008	Mutant Chronicles	Hodge	
2009	Stranded	Mickey	Short film
2010	F	Janitor	
2010	The Scared of Death Society	Mr. Russell	
2010	Collectables	Man	Short film
2011	The Public Benefits	Reader	Short film
2011	Age of Minority	Cafe figment	Short film
2011	The Great Ghost Rescue	Man on soap box	
2012	Bucco Blanco	Roman	Short film
2013	Paddy's Paradise	Paddy	Short film
2014	The Sleeping Room	Fiskin	
2015	Legend	Philip Testa	
2017	Leatherface	Dr. Lang	
2023	Bank of Dave	Production manager	

Television as actor
Year	Title	Role	Notes
1994-1999	Murder Most Horrid	Mikey Perugiano / Mr. Beast	2 episodes ("A Severe Case of Death / Whoopi Stone")
1996	London's Burning	Metson	1 episode ("Series 9, Episode 9")
1996	The Prince and the Pauper	Sentry	1 episode ("Episode #1.1")
1997	Crime Traveller	John Crowley	1 episode ("The Revenge of the Chronology Protection Hypothesis")
1997	Melissa	1st hood	1 episode ("Episode #1.4")
1997-2001	The Bill	Tam Morris / Bob Forrest	2 episodes ("Fool / Risk Factor")
1998	Jonathan Creek	The stalker	1 episode ("Danse Macabre")
1998	The Vanishing Man	Shades	1 episode ("Season 1, Episode 2")
1998	Duck Patrol	Silty Moffat Jr.	1 episode ("The Siege of Mallory Wharf")
2000	Lock, Stock...	Three Feet	6 episodes
2001	'Orrible	Les	1 episode ("Enter the Garage")
2002	Murder in Mind	Detective Stetford	1 episode ("Flashback")
2011	The Shadow Line	Richards	4 episodes
2021	Queens of Mystery	Lucky Jim	1 episode ("Sparring with Death: Final Chapter")

Television as self
Year	Title	Role	Notes
2025	Razor Blade Smile: Vampires Forever	Himself; feature	Documentary, posthumous release
