= Evil Calls: The Raven =

Evil Calls
- Directed by: Richard Driscoll
- Written by: Richard Driscoll
- Produced by: Richard Driscoll
- Starring: Rik Mayall; Eileen Daly; Jason Donovan; Norman Wisdom; Robin Askwith
- Narrated by: Marianne Faithfull
- Cinematography: Dennis Mahoney; David Raedeker
- Edited by: Tom Ramsbottom; Pablo Renaldo
- Music by: David Richmond
- Production companies: House of Fear; Metropolis International Pictures Ltd.
- Distributed by: House of Fear (2011, UK - all media)
- Release date: 13 June 2011
- Running time: 90 minutes
- Country: United Kingdom
- Language: English

Evil Calls: The Raven, also known as The Legend of Harrow Woods, Alone in the Dark and simply as Evil Calls, is a 2011 British horror film written, produced and directed by Richard Driscoll, starring Rik Mayall, Jason Donovan, Eileen Daly, Norman Wisdom and Robin Askwith.

The film began production in 2002 under the original title "Alone in the Dark", but it was not completed and released until six years later.

== Synopsis ==
A group of students go to a haunted forest called Harrow Woods in New England for a weekend vacation to investigate the disappearance of horror novelist George Carney and his family who have been missing (presumed dead) for two years. Led by lecturer, Karl Mathers, the group embark on their investigation into the forest. They discover that in the 17th century the infamous witch, Lenore Selwyn, was burnt at the stake within Harrow Woods. As she struggled against the flames she cursed the land her ashes fell upon. The group are murdered one by one. The George Carney story appears in flashback as the students, particularly Anna, a psychic, investigate Harrow Woods and the abandoned log cabin where the Carney family was suspected to have been murdered two years previously.

== Cast ==
- Jason Donovan ... Gary, a website designer who helps plan the trip into Harrow Woods.
- Rik Mayall ... Winston Llamata Jr, a menacing spirit of a former hotel manager who tricks writer George Carney into killing his wife. Mayall filmed his scenes in 2002, back when the working title for the film was Alone in the Dark.
- Norman Wisdom ... Winston Llamata. Sir Norman Wisdom shot a small scene in 2002, aged 86, under the title Alone in the Dark. Wisdom had no idea it was gratuitous.
- Robin Askwith... Vincent. Askwith plays George's brother Vincent, who is having an affair with George's wife.
- Richard Waters ... Karl Mathers
- Sonya Vine ... Rachel
- Kathryn Rooney ... Anna. Rooney filmed her part in 2002.
- Charlie Allan ... Lewis
- Ben Tolkien ... James
- Paul Battin ... Steve
- Jules Wheeler ... Vivienne Carney
- Eileen Daly ... Victoria
- Vass Anderson ... Professor Jackson
- Keren Hatcher ... Lisa Carney
- Jamie Roberts ... Steve Carney
- Jim Johnson ... Vincent Price's voice
- Rebekka Raynor ... Demon's mother
- Marianne Faithfull ... Narrator. Faithfull lent her voice to the film although it was recorded several years earlier, when the project was still titled Alone in the Dark
- Christopher Walken ... Raven (voice)

== Production ==
=== Titles ===
Originally titled Alone in the Dark, the title was changed to Evil Calls just before release to avoid confusion with the Alone in the Dark computer game and its movie adaptation. This is why in some interviews Richard Driscoll mentions it by this name. Evil Calls is the first in a pair or trilogy of Raven films, inspired by the 1845 poem "The Raven" by Edgar Allan Poe. However, the film was released on DVD in 2011 as The Legend of Harrow Woods.

=== Homage ===
The film derives material from, amongst others, The Shining, Reservoir Dogs and The Blair Witch Project (teenagers go into the woods to film a project and are chased by someone trying to kill them); as well as uncredited footage from The City of the Dead (1960), which is used to represent the death of Lenore Selwyn (Elizabeth Selwyn in the original).

== Reception ==
The British film critic M. J. Simpson has published a detailed analysis of the plot and structure of the film.
