= School of the Holy Beast =

1974 film by Norifumi Suzuki

- Poster to School of the Holy Beast
- Directed by: Norifumi Suzuki
- Written by: Masahiro Kakefuda; Norifumi Suzuki
- Starring: Yumi Takigawa; Fumio Watanabe; Emiko Yamauchi
- Music by: Masao Yagi
- Distributed by: Toei
- Release date: February 16, 1974 (Japan)
- Running time: 91 minutes
- Country: Japan
- Language: Japanese

School of the Holy Beast a.k.a. Convent of the Sacred Beast (聖獣学園, Seijū gakuen) is a film in the nunsploitation subgenre of Pinky violence made by Toei Company in 1974. The film is also known as The Transgressor.

== Plot ==
A young woman Maya (Yumi Takigawa) becomes a nun at the Sacred Heart Convent to find out what happened to her mother Michiko years earlier. She encounters a lesbian mother superior, lecherous archbishops, and uncovers many dark secrets. The convent also practices brutal discipline and encourages masochistic rituals such as self-flagellation. In one scene, two nuns are forced to strip to the waist and whip each other severely with heavy floggers. Later, Maya is tortured and whipped by a group of nuns armed with rose-thorns. Eventually she discovers the seemingly kind priest of the abbey raped her mother and hanged her, revealing that he is her father. After killing the mother superior, Maya sleeps with her father before revealing her true identity, and stabbing him in the back with a crucifix.

== Cast ==
- Yumi Takigawa as Maya Takigawa
- Emiko Yamauchi as Matsuko Ishida
- Yayoi Watanabe as Hisako Kitano
- Yōko Mihara as Sadako Matsumara
- Fumio Watanabe as Priest Kakinuma

== Critical appraisal ==
Praising the work of writer/director Norifumi Suzuki as well as the leading actors, critic Donald Guarisco of Allmovie says, "This Japanese shocker manages to [be] shocking and artistically stunning all at once."

In TokyoScope: The Japanese Cult Film Companion, Patrick Macias calls the film a "comic adaptation and a blasphemous sermon of high camp and knowing literary intelligence." He continues, "Trashy as it may sound, Suzuki's film is absolutely gorgeous to gaze upon."

== Availability ==
The Cult Epics company released School of the Holy Beast on region-1 DVD on August 30, 2005. The extras on the DVD included the original theatrical trailer, and interviews with lead actress Yumi Takigawa and film critic Risaku Kiridoushi.

== Sources ==
- "Le Couvent de la Bête Sacrée" (in French). pinku.cho-yaba.com.
- Buchanan, Jason. "School of the Holy Beast". Allmovie.
- Guarisco, Donald. "School of the Holy Beast : Review". Allmovie.
- Macias, Patrick (2001). "School of the Holy Beast". TokyoScope: The Japanese Cult Film Companion. San Francisco: Cadence Books. p. 182. ISBN 1-56931-681-3.
- "School of the Holy Beast (1974)". pinky-violence.com.
- "School of the Holy Beast (review)". www.filmatheist.com.
- Sharp, Jasper (2006-05-03). "School of the Holy Beast (1974)". midnighteye.com.
- Thompson, Nathaniel (2006). DVD Delirium: The International Guide to Weird and Wonderful Films on DVD; Volume 3. Godalming, England: FAB Press. pp. 460–461. ISBN 1-903254-40-X.
- DVD Review at Frankly Mr Shankly
