= Rose (2012 film) =

- festival poster
- Directed by: Kemal Yildirim
- Written by: Jack James; Stephen Loveless; Kemal Yildirim
- Starring: Helen Clifford, Mike Mitchell, Patrick Regis
- Cinematography: Jason Impey
- Edited by: Jack James, Kemal Yildirim
- Music by: The Courtesans
- Production company: Rose the Film
- Distributed by: Shami Media
- Release dates: 15 April 2012 (London Independent Film Festival)
- Running time: 86 minutes
- Country: United Kingdom
- Language: English

Rose is a 2012 British thriller film directed by Kemal Yildirim. The film premiered on 15 May 2012 at the London Independent Film Festival and was released on DVD on 20 May 2014 in the United States with other territories to follow.

The film stars Helen Clifford as Rose, a drug addict and prostitute trying to raise her daughter Ellie, and is based upon Yildirim's 2008 short film by the same name, which screened at Cannes, and resulted in his being encouraged to expand the short into a feature film.

== Plot ==
Set in Hellville, Rose follows a woman who is living on the margins of society. She is struggling with drug addiction and involvement in prostitution under the control of a local crime figure known as Blondie. Rose is attempting to survive while caring for her young daughter, Ellie, both of whom remain dependent on Blondie's protection and resources.

Rose places herself and her daughter at risk from escalating threats and violence from Blondie, when she begins working independently without his knowledge. As pressure mounts, she forms a fragile family unit with Ellie and Tony, a man who also seeks escape from their shared circumstances. Together, they endure hardship and abuse while attempting to break free from Blondie's control.

The film centres on Rose's efforts to overcome drug addiction, protect her daughter, and reclaim control over her life as she struggles to escape Hellville in pursuit of a safer future.

== Cast ==
- Helen Clifford as Rose
- Mike Mitchell as Blondie
- Patrick Regis as Tony
- Chelsea Impey (as Chelsea Alcock) as Ellie
- Lucy White as Magdalena
- Eileen Daly as Yondra
- Gary Cross as Filthy Mick
- Ryan Hunter (as Rami Hilmi) as Baldo
- Elaine Hartley as Rebs
- Gemma Crabtree as Jols
- Geneveive Cleghorn as Laine
- Caroline Nash as Susan
- Kemal Yildirim as Lead Chancer
- Jack James as Pete the Perv

=== Accolades ===
Awards
Award	Year of ceremony	Category	Recipient(s)	Result	Ref.
Amsterdam Film Festival	2012	Van Gogh Award for Cinematic Vision	Rose	Won	
