= Flavia the Heretic =

- Shameless Screen Ent. cover
- Directed by: Gianfranco Mingozzi
- Screenplay by: Fabrizio Onofri; Gianfranco Mingozzi; Bruno Di Geronimo; Sergio Tau
- Story by: Raniero di Giovanbattista; Sergio Tau; Francesco Vietri
- Produced by: Gianfranco Mingozzi
- Starring: Florinda Bolkan; María Casares; Claudio Cassinelli; Anthony Higgins
- Cinematography: Alfio Contini
- Edited by: Ruggero Mastroianni
- Music by: Nicola Piovani
- Production companies: Produzioni Atlas Consorziate (P.A.C.); Réalisations et Organisations Cinématographiques (R.O.C.)
- Distributed by: Produzioni Atlas Consorziate (P.A.C.)
- Release date: June 12, 1974
- Running time: 100 minutes
- Countries: Italy; France
- Language: Italian

Flavia the Heretic (Italian: Flavia, la monaca musulmana, lit. "Flavia, the Muslim nun") is a 1974 Italian-French nunsploitation film directed by Gianfranco Mingozzi.

== Plot ==
Set in Apulia during the Ottoman invasion of Otranto, the film tells the story of Flavia (Florinda Bolkan), a nun who collaborates with the invaders' leader Ahmed (Anthony Higgins as Anthony Corlan) to avenge her past misfortunes.

== Cast ==
- Florinda Bolkan as Flavia Gaetani
- María Casares as Sister Agata
- Claudio Cassinelli as Abraham
- Anthony Higgins: Ahmed
- Spiros Focás as French Duke
- Diego Michelotti as Flavia's Father
- Guido Celano as Chemist
- Laura De Marchi as Tarantula Cult Woman
