= Pervirella =

1997 British film

- Directed by: Alex Chandon; Josh Collins
- Written by: Alex Chandon (script); Josh Collins (story); Jason Slater; Nico Rilla (additional material)
- Produced by: Josh Collins
- Starring: Emily Booth; Eileen Daly; Sexton Ming
- Cinematography: Cobra Media; Jon Ford
- Edited by: Alex Chandon
- Music by: François Evans
- Production company: Exotic Entertainment Productions
- Distributed by: Eclectic DVD Distribution; Screen Edge
- Release date: 19 September 1997
- Running time: 92 minutes
- Country: United Kingdom
- Language: English

Pervirella is a 1997 adventure-comedy film which was directed by Alex Chandon, the film stars Emily Booth in the lead role and featured brief cameos from Jonathan Ross and Mark Lamarr.

Pervirella harbors a sex demon within her.

== Plot ==
In the land of Condon, the deranged Queen Victoria seals the country in behind a huge wall and establishes a "Monarchy of Terror." The intellectuals and sexually liberated are persecuted and murdered. Some of them form an underground movement, the Cult of Perv, led by the Demon Nanny who dies giving birth to Pervirella, who grows at an amazing rate into a beautiful young woman. Whenever her magic necklace is removed, Pervirella becomes a raging nymphomaniac and - hunted by every interested group in Condon - teams up with special agent Amicus Reilly.

== Cast ==
- Emily Bouffante as Pervirella
- Sexton Ming as Queen Victoria
- Eileen Daly as Cu-Rare
- Max Décharné as The Curator
- Helen Darling as Effete
- Mark Lamarr as Irch Bishop
- Jonathan Ross as Bish Archop
- David Warbeck as Amicus Reilly
- Rebecca Eden as Demon Nanny
- Roger Robinson as Admiral Titeship
- Matt Brain as Duke Nehru / Soggy
- Alex Chandon as Savage Dynamite
- Robert Black as Duke Nukem 3D
- Austin Vince as Cheeky Chinaman
- Mark White as Abo Rafia / Scarred Perv
- William Loveday as Spiritual Guru
- Peter Godwin as Macho
- John Lee as Hairy
- Graham Russel as Corny
- Cathi Unsworth as Beautiful Pervette
- Yvan Dustaphonics Serrano as Sake Server

== Production ==
Alex Chandon and Josh Collins cast over 140 actors for his film project, include Caroline Munroe, but she left the project after short time.

== Release ==
The film was originally released as VHS Tape on 27 October 1998 in the UK. The DVD contains comprehensive biographies, the story behind the film and its music, photos and more and was released on 5 May 2002 over Eclectic DVD Distribution.

== Soundtrack ==
The Soundtrack was released as a 'Rock'n'Roll-Victorian-Erotic-Horror-Soundtrack', composed by François Evans, it includes tracks from Frat Shack Shakedown and Perve Parlor.
