= Sex and Shopping =

- Country of origin: United Kingdom

Original release
- Network: Channel 5
- Release: 1998 – 2001

Sex and Shopping is a documentary series on the global sex industry. The series examines contemporary attitudes concerning commercial sex, censorship and experimentation. Each episode explores aspects of the legal international commercial sex industry, finance and lifestyles. It was produced for Channel 5 and three series were made. The first aired in 1998, the second in 2000 and the third in 2001 in the United Kingdom.
