= Salvation Group =

Salvation Group is a UK-based media company, specialising in exploitation film and alternative music. The company's original name and current trading name is Redemption Films. The Salvation Group was dissolved in November 2014.

== History ==
Salvation's origins can be traced back to 1993, when founder Nigel Wingrove started up a film distribution label under the name Redemption Films. Since then, the company has broadened its scope to include the distribution of music and literature and the online model community, the Satanic Sluts.

== Labels ==
Today, Salvation Group comprises the following projects;

=== Redemption Films ===
Redemption showcases the best in European horror and sleaze cinema, with such titles as Killer Nun, Profondo Rosso and films by Jess Franco, Jean Rollin, Dario Argento, Mario Bava, Bruno Mattei, Lucio Fulci among others. They also release classics such as Nosferatu, Vampyr, The Phantom Carriage, M and The Cabinet of Dr. Caligari.

=== Other film labels ===
Salvation distributes films through other film labels, each specialising in their own cinema genres:

- Jezebel Films: soft-core sexploitation from the 60s and 70s;
- Purgatory Films: specifically adult interest films, including works by Michael Ninn;
- Purgatory has both softcore and hardcore titles;
- Sacrament Films: contemporary Japanese pink cinema.

=== Music ===
- Triple Silence: Salvation's record label specialising in dark, sexual and satanic music with a recent move towards more dark metal and all its sub-genres.
- Hydra: an offshoot of Triple Silence, covers Industrial, Martial, Neofolk, Noise and the emerging Military pop genre.

=== Television ===
Redemption TV was a brief partnership between Salvation and Carnaby Media to create an alternative lifestyle channel, which aired on Sky Digital. Salvation ceased their involvement with this project shortly after launch, and the channel was rebranded as ROCKWORLD.TV.

=== Magazines ===
Nihilista is a free magazine, containing articles on goth culture and reviews of alternative music and exploitation cinema.

=== Other projects ===
Satanic Sluts, created in 2004 by Nigel Wingrove, is a global community of alternative women, who create horror-themed imagery and performance. Salvation have produced three DVDs and one coffee-table book of photography, called "Blood and Dishonour: The dark, bloody and perversely erotic world of the Satanic Sluts – Satan’s true Sirens" (published by Fab Press in 2007), under the name Satanic Sluts.

Salvation has created the first online horror movie streaming website, called redemptionfilmstv.com, where it showcases a selection of films from the Redemption catalogue.

Salvation also runs an adult content website named purgatory-films.com.

== Production ==
Salvation Group also produces its own films, including nunsploitation shocker Sacred Flesh and Satanic Sluts series, including; "Satanic Sluts: The Black Order Cometh" (2008), featuring horror-themed performances from members of the Satanic Sluts; "Satanic Sluts II: The Black Masses" (2008), which is a documentary on the nightclub Black Mass, where each night members of the Satanic Sluts performed horror burlesque routines; and Satanic Sluts III: Scandalized (2009), an erotic imagination of the Russell Brand Show prank telephone calls row concerning Satanic Slut Georgina Baillie.
