= Visions of Ecstasy =

- UK DVD cover
- Directed by: Nigel Wingrove
- Written by: Nigel Wingrove
- Produced by: John Stephenson
- Starring: Louise Downie; Elisha Scott; Dan Fox
- Cinematography: Ricardo Coll
- Edited by: Steve Graham
- Music by: Steven Severin
- Release date: 1989
- Running time: 18 minutes
- Country: United Kingdom
- Language: English

Visions of Ecstasy is a 1989 British short film directed by Nigel Wingrove and starring Louise Downie, Elisha Scott, and Dan Fox. It became the only work to be refused certification by the British Board of Film Classification (BBFC) on the grounds of blasphemy. The film features sexualised scenes of Saint Teresa of Ávila with the body of Jesus on the cross.

== Ban ==
As cutting the scenes would remove approximately half of the film's content, the BBFC decided to refuse certification altogether. The board felt that any release of the film could be liable for prosecution under the common law offence of blasphemous libel, making the refusal a form of prior restraint.

The distributor appealed to the European Court of Human Rights. It emerged in 2018 that while the case was pending the Prime Minister, John Major, had considered attempting to derogate from the provisions of the European Convention on Human Rights relating to free expression to preempt or override a decision by the court to allow the film's release. This prompted the Foreign Secretary, Douglas Hurd, to point out this was not possible "except in cases of war or threats to the life of the nation". In the end the court found that the UK's blasphemy laws were consistent with the Convention, effectively upholding the BBFC's decision to refuse certification.

=== Sale during ban ===
A secondary school science teacher was arrested for selling Wingrove's Visions of Ecstasy in February 1992 in Birmingham. Michael Newman, an atheist, then repeated the act of selling the video in public near to Canterbury Cathedral. This led to a debate with the Bishop of Rochester on BBC Radio Kent. Newman later resigned as a teacher following a suspension pending a disciplinary after lobbying from a group of Christian Army parents. Newman also made an appearance on Channel Four’s Comment in August 1992.

=== Eventual release ===
In 2008 the blasphemy laws in the UK were repealed. In January 2012 the BBFC gave the film an 18 certificate with no cuts or alterations to the original film's content.

== See also ==
- List of films banned in the United Kingdom
