= Karaoke Challenge =

- Starring: Various
- Country of origin: United Kingdom
- No. of series: 1

Production
- Running time: 30mins (inc comms)

Original release
- Network: Challenge TV
- Release: 1997

Karaoke Challenge is a British game show that originally aired on Challenge TV in 1997. The series targeted younger viewers, and was promoted by with a national ad campaign along with Name That Tune.

It was hosted by a variety of hosts.
