= Emily Booth =

English actress

- Born: 26 April 1976 (age 50); Chester, Cheshire, England
- Other name: Emily "Bouff" Bouffante
- Occupations: Actress; TV presenter; writer
- Years active: 1997–present

Emily Katherine Booth (born 26 April 1976), also known by her stage name Emily "Bouff" Bouffante, is an English actress and television presenter. Booth is known for her roles in cult films Pervirella, Cradle of Fear, Evil Aliens and the BAFTA nominated short film Inferno. She appeared in Quentin Tarantino and Robert Rodriguez's double header Grindhouse (2007). Booth has also hosted numerous television and game shows. In 2014, she directed, produced and acted in the short film, Selkie.

== Early life ==
While she was a student, Booth earned money busking playing the violin and sang on Eurotrash.

== Career ==
Booth is known for her roles in cult films Pervirella, Cradle of Fear, Evil Aliens and the BAFTA nominated short film Inferno. She appeared in Quentin Tarantino and Robert Rodriguez's double header Grindhouse (2007) in the mock trailer, "Don't", by Edgar Wright.

Booth was also the host of several Channel 4 and satellite television shows. She co-presented and co-wrote the video-game review show, Bits for two years in 1999–2001. She was a segment presenter on Channel 4 flagship morning show, The Big Breakfast (2001), and presented on the gameshow Banzai for E4. Other shows she worked on are: L!VE TV's Blue Review, paintball-challenge show, Mission: Paintball (2001–2), Threesome (1999) and Demolition (2002).

Booth has presented several television programmes related to cult films, including OUT There on five (2002) and Shock Movie Massacre on Bravo.

Booth is a presenter on Eat Cinema, interviewing A-list Hollywood stars on The Buzz and hosting her own show, First Night Bites. She also hosted the now-defunct Quiz Night Live, a premium-rate call-in quiz show, shown on satellite/Freeview channel Ftn. She presents The Match on the XLeague.tvchannel. In 2007, she joined Zone Horror, where she works as a presenter and continuity announcer. In 2007, Booth became the face of the Horror Channel, and hosted a monthly highlights show, Horror Bites.

Booth was among the guests at the 2009 Festival of Fantastic Films in Manchester and announced the results of the Delta Film Award. She co-hosted the Frighten Brighton Classic Horror Film Festival in Brighton in August 2012.

She directed, produced and acted in a short film, Selkie, in 2014.

== Personal life ==
She has two children.

== Filmography ==
Film credits
Year	Title	Role	Notes
1997	Event Horizon	Girl in "bloody orgy" (cut) and "Visions of Hell" sequences	Uncredited
1997	Pervirella	Pervirella	
1998	Witchcraft X: Mistress of the Craft	Linnaca	
1999	Sacred Flesh	Williams girlfriend	
2001	Cradle of Fear	Mel	
2001	Inferno	Laura	Short film
2002	Arthur's Amazing Things	Denise Clarington-Semi-Skimmed	Short film
2002	Fallen Angels	Sally Munro	Uncredited
2003	Spiderbabe	Fly Girl	Scenes deleted
2005	Evil Aliens	Michelle Fox	
2007	Grindhouse	Cameo	Uncredited
2007	Don't	Featured woman	
2009	Doghouse	The Snipper	
2009	Terror Toons 3	Nurse Stanley	
2011	The Reverend	Tracy	
2011	Inbred	June	
2012	After Death	Hazel	
2012	Over Developed	Angry model	
2012	Three's a Shroud	Cameo	
2014	Selkie	Selkie	Short film
2016	Blaze of Gory	Lea-Anne	
2016	London Horror Story	Angry woman	
2018	Dead Love	Table	
2019	Shed of the Dead	Harriet	
2019	Turn Off Your Bloody Phone: FFIDENT20	Barbara	
2020	They're Outside	Penny	
2022	Darkheart Manor	Hazel	
2023	Terror Toons 4	Female scientist	
2023	Werewolf Santa	Carol	
2026	Electric Meat	the Landlady	

=== Television ===
- Forgot About The Drive-By: The Montell Jordan Story (2011) – presenter
- videoGaiden (2008)
- Bits (1999–2001) – writer and presenter
- The Big Breakfast: August 2001 – presenter
- outTHERE: season three (2002) – presenter (Eden)
- Shock Movie Massacre – presenter
- Blue Review – presenter
- Threesome (1999) – Eve
- Mission Paintball (2001–2002) – presenter
- Demolition (2002) – presenter
- Eat Cinema channel – presenter
- The Great Big British Quiz – presenter
- Quiz Night Live – presenter
- Make Your Play – presenter
- The Match – presenter
- Horror Channel – presenter/voiceover
