= Michelle Thorne =

British pornographic actress (born 1975

- Born: Michelle Marie Thorne; 2 August 1975 (age 51); Bristol, England
- Other names: Michelle; Tasha; Michelle Thorpe
- Occupations: Glamour model; pornographic actress; director
- Height: 5 ft 3 in (1.60 m)
- Website: michellethornexxxposed.com

Michelle Marie Thorne (born 2 August 1975) is an English glamour model, pornographic actress and director.

== Career ==
Thorne has worked with production companies such as Bluebird Films, Extreme Associates and Union Jaxxx. She also has her own production company called Bombchelle Productions.

The BBC named her as "one of the best-known faces in the British porn industry and one of the top actresses" in an article published in August 2005. She has also written and directed several adult films.

In 2005, Thorne appeared as a singing contestant in the second episode of series 2 of The X Factor.

Her other film and television appearances include nine episodes of the comedy series Brainiac: Science Abuse and a voiceover role in the 2001 anime film Bondage Mansion (originally Kinbaku no tachi). More mainstream appearances include the television movies Sacred Flesh and Probable Cause.

== See also ==
- List of British pornographic film actors
- Viv Thomas
