= Burlesque (2010 Australian film) =

2010 Australian drama film

- Theatrical release poster
- Directed by: Dominic Deacon
- Written by: Dominic Deacon
- Produced by: Anna Young
- Starring: Haydn Evans; Christina Hallett; Poppy Cherry; Virginia Bowers; Dennis Kreusler; Mat Stevenson; Mat Wearing
- Cinematography: Tim Metherall
- Edited by: Dominic Deacon
- Music by: Evan "Moxie" Kitchener
- Production company: DANK Films
- Release date: 26 August 2010
- Running time: 90 minutes
- Country: Australia
- Language: English

Burlesque is a 2010 drama film directed and written by Dominic Deacon and starring Haydn Evans, Christina Hallett and Poppy Cherry. The film was released on 26 August 2010 in Australia and won Best Australian Feature Film at the 2010 Sexy International Film Festival. This film was shot in Melbourne, Victoria.

== Plot ==
Frank Bannister is about to have a very long night. A writer of violent horror stories, Frank is alone, depressed and one step from full blown alcoholism. Late one dark and stormy night his quiet hermit existence is disturbed when two eccentric exotic dancers arrive on his doorstep. Alternatively seductive and sinister the beautiful women promise to make all Frank's dreams come true. They prove to be as good as their word. Only problem is, Frank is a man with very dark dreams indeed.

== Cast ==
- Haydn Evans as Frank Bannister
- Christina Hallett as Veronica
- Poppy Cherry as Tammy
- Virginia Bowers as Fiona
- Dennis Kreusler as Richard
- Mat Stevenson as Director
- Mat Wearing as Security Guard

== Soundtrack ==
The soundtrack was composed by Evan "Moxie" Kitchener who also created the score for Deacon's other 2 features Bad Habits and Only the Young Die Good. The score has been described as menacing.

Additional music.

1. "Downtown" (Written by Cash Savage) — Performed by Cash Savage and the Last Drinks
2. "For The Goodtimes" (Written by Cash Savage) — Performed by Cash Savage and The Last Drinks
3. "Love n'a Shovel" (Written by James and Matt Inabinet) — Performed by Brothers Grim and The Blue Murders
4. "Hard Time Killin' Floor" (Written by Skip James) — Performed by Brothers Grim and The Blue Murders
5. "Fade Out" (Written by Juke Baritone) — Performed by Juke Baritone

== Reception ==
Mike Everleth of the Underground Film Journal said, "The title Burlesque refers to the alleged occupation of Tammy and Veronica, who claim to be dancers and which would potentially explain their odd garments when they visit Frank. While there’s not much actual burlesque action in the film, Deacon does employ a whole lot of seductive teasing, but just not in the way that may be expected."

Jeff Ritchie of ScaryMinds gave eight stars (out of ten) calling it, "Burlesque is a surreal nightmare that will have you clambering for more." Added: "Once again Dominic Deacon presents a slice of surrealistic horror that will have you questioning your own terms of reference."

Severed Cinema's Ray Casta gave four stars (out of five) and said, "Imagination can be a very powerful thing, and Dominic Deacon understands this notion perfectly".
