= Witchcraft X: Mistress of the Craft =

- Directed by: Elisar Cabrera
- Written by: Elisar Cabrera
- Produced by: Frank Scantori; Jerry Feifer; Jon Blay; Elisar Cabrera
- Starring: Stephanie Beaton; Wendy Cooper; Eileen Daly
- Cinematography: Alvin Leong
- Edited by: E. C. Kennedy
- Music by: Red Monkey
- Distributed by: Simitar Entertainment (US, DVD)
- Release date: 1998
- Running time: 95 in
- Country: United States
- Language: English

Witchcraft X: Mistress of the Craft is a 1998 American horror film directed by Elisar Cabrera and starring Stephanie Beaton, Wendy Cooper, and Eileen Daly. The tenth film in the Witchcraft series, it was produced by Vista Street Entertainment. The movie is followed by Witchcraft XI: Sisters in Blood.

== Plot ==
Two men in a London bar pick up women who, unbeknownst to them, are vampires. The vampires quickly attack and kill the men.

Detective Lucy Lutz is assigned to assist Interpol in extraditing avowed Satanist/murderer Hyde (Kerry Knowlton) back to the U.S. Hyde is being held by Bureau 17 of Interpol, which specializes in cases involving the supernatural

While Lutz is en route, the vampires help Hyde escape. Hyde is needed as the head vampire, Raven (Eileen Daly), is attempting to perform the Walpurgis ritual, which will grant her limitless powers. Hyde must translate an ancient tome before the vampires can perform this ritual.

Lutz assist Interpol agents Chris Dixon (Sean Harry) and Celeste (Wendy Cooper), (who is the invincible “Mistress Of The Craft,") in recapturing Hyde.

== Cast ==
- Stephanie Beaton as Lucy Lutz
- Kerry Knowlton as Hyde
- Eileen Daly as Raven
- Sean Harry as Chris Dixon
- Wendy Cooper as Celeste

== Continuity ==
Detective Lutz is the only character from the previous films to appear in Witchcraft X. Det Garner and Will Spanner are referenced but not seen. Witchcraft X is the second film in the series in which William Spanner does not appear. Troma Entertainment does not distribute the film, making it the first film of the series without Troma's involvement.

== Reception ==
The AV Club found that of the first thirteen films in the series, Witchcraft X was possibly the worst. Incredibly Bad Film Show stated the attempt to escape from the usual story of good versus evil warlock was a plus, and found the inclusion of vampires to be a step in the right direction, but ultimately the film is brought down by poor acting and a small budget.

== Production ==
Stephanie Beaton stated in an interview that this was her favorite of the films she had appeared in. The film was filmed in England.
