= Razor Blade Smile =

- Official Teaser Poster
- Directed by: Jake West
- Screenplay by: Jake West
- Produced by: Jake West; Robert Mercer
- Starring: Eileen Daly; Christopher Adamson; Heidi James
- Cinematography: James Solan
- Edited by: Jake West
- Music by: Richard Wells
- Production companies: Manga Live; Eye Deal Image
- Distributed by: Manga Entertainment
- Release date: 19 September 1998
- Running time: 102 minutes
- Country: United Kingdom
- Language: English

Razor Blade Smile is a 1998 British horror vampire film, written and directed by Jake West. It stars Eileen Daly, Christopher Adamson, David Warbeck in his final role and Heidi James. The film has since become notable for being the lowest budget film to have a cinematic release in the United Kingdom.

== Plot ==
150 years ago, in the year 1850, Lilith Silver is mortally wounded as she attempts to avenge the dueling death of her lover by Sir Sethane Blake. Enamored by her spirit, Sir Sethane reveals himself to be a vampire to Silver and grants her the gift (and curse) of eternal life as a vampire. Today, Lilith moves through the city as a contract killer hired to elimiate all members of the mysterious and evil Masonic "Illuminati" sect, the leader of which is Sir Sethane. Clad in black latex and armed with a coffin full of weaponry, the vampiric hitwoman hunts down her targets while the police close in on her trail, desperate to end the carnage.

== Cast ==
- Eileen Daly as Lilith Silver
- Christopher Adamson as Sir Sethane Blake
- Jonathan Coote as Detective Inspector Price
- Kevin Howarth as Platinum
- David Warbeck as The Horror Movie Man
- Heidi James as Ariauna
- Isabel Brook as Silk
- Louisa Moore as Celeste
- Jennifer Guy as Cindy Arnold
- Mark Caven as Detective
- Bradley Lavelle as The Chill Pilgrim
- Peter Godwin as Illuminati Conspirator
- Grahame Wood as Student Photographer
- Glenn Wrage as Duelist

== Production ==
=== Filming ===
The filming began in 1996. The film was completed on a budget of £12,000, the main shoot locations of the film were shot in the director, Jake West's, parents house, a rock formation in Turnbridge Wells and at an underground goth bar in Hampstead, London. West purposefully chose locations close to his residence for connivence of shooting on a lower budget. The crew often shot without permission and had to film scenes in one take, sometimes against the actors wishes, due to the limited film roll. Props throughout the film were reused in multiple different scenes, mainly Silver's dual pistols, who were inspired by Lara Croft, the police officers in long-shots used toy guns.

== Release ==
The film premiered on 19 September 1998, at Fantastisk Film Festival Lund and was released in the United Kingdom as part of the Raindance Film Festival on 22 October 1998. It was released on DVD on 14 September 1999. In 2026, it was re-released in 4K resolution.

Daly went on to feature on the cover of Bizzare magazine and was interviewed on Eurotrash to promote the film.

== Reception ==
Rotten Tomatoes, a review aggregator, reports that 14% of seven surveyed critics gave the film a positive review. Ken Eisner of Variety magazine called the film a cheesy, over-the-top vampire film with enough style to make up for its acting and plotting. Time Out London wrote that despite the film's faults, "there's a no-nonsense, unapologetic mood that makes the film hard to dislike." Kevin Thomas of the Los Angeles Times called it "a silly, gory, overly self-congratulatory vampire comedy". Christopher Varney of Film Threat rated it 2/5 stars and called it "loud, atmospheric nonsense" that "rates high on the novelty factor". David Johnson of DVD Verdict called it forgettable and generic vampire film that has a distracting visual style. Kim Newman (Sight & Sound) described the film as "essentially the work of enthusiastic fans rather than pros" noting that "performances are extremely amateurish, which hamstrings the expositions scenes and makes for a succession of annoying walk-on victims." The film has mixed reviews, mostly positive, on user-review sites IMDb and Letterboxd.

Despite negative reviews, the film has since gained a cult following and received mostly positive reviews from horror critics.

== Awards ==
The film went on to win majority of the top awards at the first ever B-Movie Film Festival in 1999.

- Best B-Movie Film Actress: Eileen Daly
- Best B-Movie Film Director: Jake West
- Best B-Movie Film Cinematography: Razor Blade Smile
- Best B-Movie Film Special Effects: Razor Blade Smile
