= Jake West (director) =

British film director

- Born: 1972 (age 53–54); United Kingdom
- Occupations: Director, producer, writer

Jake West is a British independent film director known for his work in horror cinema and for documentaries about filmmakers, actors and the history of British cinema.

== Biography ==
West's first feature film was Razor Blade Smile, released in 1998. His second film, released in 2005, was Evil Aliens, described as a 'British slapstick horror-comedy', in the tradition of films such as Braindead, House, and Evil Dead. It was the first full-length British horror film to be filmed using Sony HD cameras and contains over a hundred digital effect shots as well as many conventional gory special effects.

Following the success of Evil Aliens, West directed a made-for-TV sequel to the 1988 film Pumpkinhead. Pumpkinhead: Ashes to Ashes was co-written by West with Barbara Werner. The film was shot in Romania for the American Sci Fi Channel.

His next film Doghouse was a horror-comedy starring Danny Dyer, Noel Clarke and Stephen Graham, whose 'magic ingredient' was a 'sly script' by British comic book creator Dan Schaffer, who is known for Dogwitch and The Scribbler. The movie was released in 2009. He next film is a shark thriller called White, which stars Katherine McNamara and Kate Beckinsale.

== Filmography ==
- Club Death (1994)
- Razor Blade Smile (1998)
- Whacked (2002)
- Evil Aliens (2005)
- Pumpkinhead: Ashes to Ashes (2006)
- Doghouse (2009)
- Video Nasties: Moral Panic, Censorship & Videotape (2010)
- The ABCs of Death (2012)
- Video Nasties: Draconian Days (2014)
- Xploring Xtro (2018)
- Mancunian Man: The Legendary Life of Cliff Twemlow (Severin Films, 2023)
- White
