= Queenadreena discography =

English alternative rock band discography

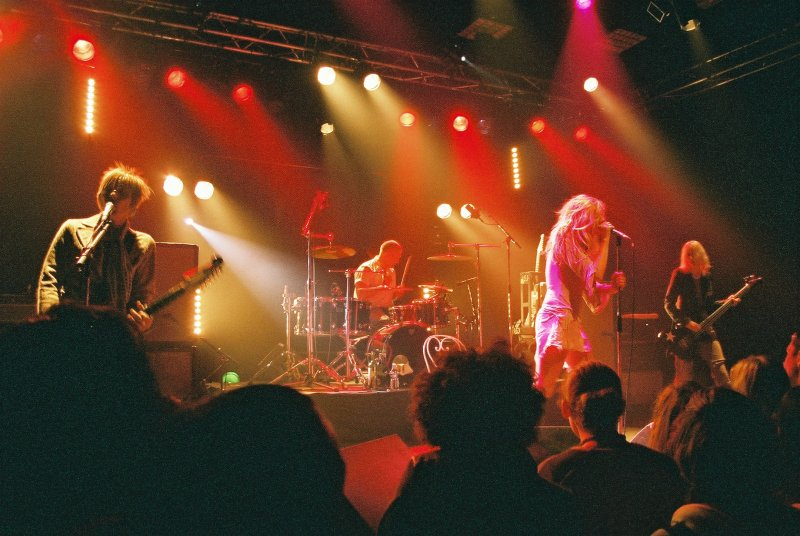
- Queenadreena performing in 2006
- Studio albums: 4
- Compilation albums: 1
- Singles: 7
- Music videos: 5
- Miscellaneous: 1
- Live albums: 1

The discography of English alternative rock band Queenadreena consists of four studio albums, seven singles, and one compilation album. Formed in London by former Daisy Chainsaw members KatieJane Garside and Crispin Gray, Queenadreena released their debut album, Taxidermy, in 2000 on Blanco y Negro Records. Their following album, Drink Me (2002), was released on Rough Trade before the group signed with One Little Indian, who released their third studio album, The Butcher and the Butterfly (2005).

They released a live album, Live at the ICA, which contains a performance supporting The Butcher and the Butterfly, before independently releasing a series of demo tracks on the compilation album Ride a Cock Horse (2007). Their final album was Djin (2008), released by Imperial Records.

== Studio albums ==
Title	Album details	Peak chart positions
Title	Album details	JPN
Taxidermy	Released: 17 April 2000; Label: Blanco y Negro, WEA Japan	—
Drink Me	Released: 24 June 2002; Label: Rough Trade	—
The Butcher and the Butterfly	Released: 23 May 2005; Label: One Little Indian, Imperial	—
Djin	Released: 8 October 2008; Label: Imperial	120

== Compilation albums ==
Title	Album details	Peak chart positions
Title	Album details	JPN
Ride a Cock Horse	Released: October 2007; Label: Imperial	146
Ride a Cock Horse (2026 Remix)	Released: 6 March 2026; Format: Digital download	—

== Live albums ==
Title	Album details
Live at the ICA	Released: 22 September 2005; Formats: CD, digital download; Label: One Little Indian, Imperial

== Singles ==
Song	Year	Album	Peak chart positions
Song	Year	Album	UK
"Cold Fish"	1999	Taxidermy	—
"X-ing Off the Days"	1999	Taxidermy	—
"I Adore You"	2000	Taxidermy	—
"Jolene" / "Pretty Polly"	2000	Taxidermy	100
"Pretty Like Drugs"	2002	Drink Me	102
"F.M. Doll"	2002	The Butcher and the Butterfly	103
"F.M. Doll"	2005	The Butcher and the Butterfly	81
"Medicine Jar"	2005	The Butcher and the Butterfly	109

== Music videos ==
- "Cold Fish" (1999)
- "Jolene" (2000)
- "I Adore You" (2000)
- "Pretty Like Drugs" (2002)
- "FM Doll" [Original Version] (2002)
- "Medicine Jar" (2005) (3 versions)
- "Lick" (2009)

== Home videos ==
Title	Album details
Live	Released: 2006; Formats: DVD; Label: One Little Indian
