= Ange Dolittle =

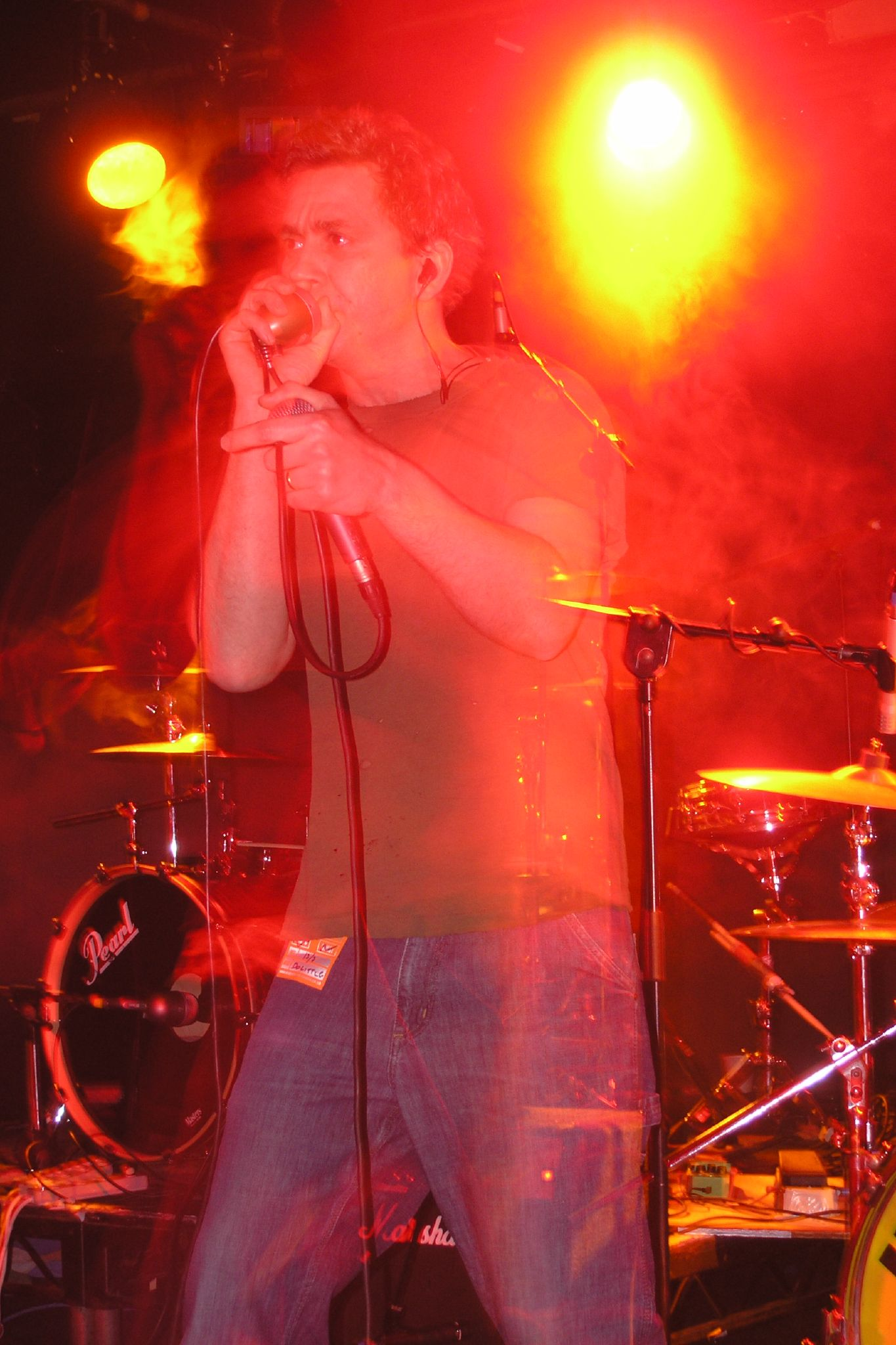
- Ange Dolittle performing with Dolittle in 2006

Background information
- Born: Andrew Robert Dolittle
- Genres: Alternative Rock
- Instruments: Vocals, Harmonica
- Years active: 1989-present
- Labels: Fiction; Polydor; H.M.D.; Noise Factory; The Echo Label; Room 512 Records; Punk Elvis Records; Belltown Records; Me Tarzan Records
- Formerly of: Eat; We Know Where You Live; Big Yoga Muffin; Dolittle

Andrew Robert Dolittle, better known as Ange Dolittle, is an English singer and songwriter best known for being the frontman for late eighties/early nineties alternative rock band Eat. Known for his charismatic stage persona baritone vocals and surreal lyrics.

== Career ==
=== EAT (mark 1) ===
Dolittle along with Pete Howard (Drums), Tim Sewell (Bass), Max Noble (Guitar) and Paul Noble (Guitar) formed Eat in Bath in 1986. They relocated to Kings Cross and signed with Fiction Records, a subsidiary of Polydor, in December 1988. Eat earned a reputation as an exciting live act due, in part, to what Sounds referred to as Dolittle's "sex God" stage persona, a comment he was quick to play down. During this period Dolittle would add vocal effects to their songs by singing into a Bullet harmonica microphone. In November 1989 Dolittle was admitted to Coppetts Wood Hospital with "one hell of an upset tummy" after eating an egg in Yeovil. Dolittle was also said to be homeless at this time. EAT's debut album Sell Me a God was released in 1989 it reached number 10 on the UK Indie chart but did not make the official UK albums chart. The band collapsed in November 1990 due to multiple factors including Dolittle's heroin habit. Dolittle was quoted at the time as saying "It got to the point where we just couldn't bear to be in the same room as each other".

=== EAT (mark 2) ===
Several months after Eat's break-up, Dolittle, Sewell and Howard went to Spain with a drum machine and a new guitarist, Jem Moorshead. Auditions for a second guitarist led to Max Lavilla joining the band. In 1992 Dolittle caused controversy when the poster for their Golden Egg EP, which depicted him naked with his genitals airbrushed out, had some local councils vowing not to put the posters up. A second album Epicure was released in 1993, considered by The Trouser Press Guide to 90s Rock as "one of the decade's greatest rock albums that no one's heard". Some of the lyrical themes on the album dealt with Dolittle's addiction problems. Promotion for the album in 1993 included sets at the Phoenix and Reading festivals as well as a set on the NME stage at Glastonbury Despite some positive reviews for Epicure, Eat eventually went their separate ways in 1994.

=== We Know Where You Live ===
After the break up of Eat, Dolittle "shared a pot of tea" with Malc Treece of The Wonder Stuff and together they formed We Know Where You Live with Paul Clifford, also of The Wonder Stuff who were old friends of EAT and the two bands had toured together on multiple occasions. The initial line-up consisted of Dolittle (vocals), Malc Treece (guitar), Paul Clifford (bass) and Steve Wren (drums) formerly of Then Jericho. Wren left after a short stint and was replaced by Martin Gilks, also a former member of The Wonder Stuff. Gilks left in 1996 to be replaced by Jim Leadbetter. They released two singles Don't Be Too Honest in 1995 and Draped in 1996, but a lack of record label interest in an album led to the band splitting up. A retrospective collection of their demos, It's Nice to be Nice, was released in 2006.

=== Big Yoga Muffin ===
After We Know Where You Live, Dolittle took some time away from the music industry and spent four years as a private investigator dealing with corporate fraud, money laundering and corruption. Dolittle met Pim Jones, formerly of Hipsway at a wedding, they started writing songs together, formed Big Yoga Muffin and signed to the Echo label. Together they released a series of E.P.s, singles and one album Wherever You Go, There You Are in 2000. The played a series of dates around the UK in 2000 and 2001 including appearances at the 2000 Reading and Leeds festivals. Promotion of the album included an appearance on channel 4's TFI Friday. Despite returning to the studio to work on new material, a second album never materialised.

=== Dolittle ===
In the early 2000s Dolittle teamed up with Rich Leicester (bass), formerly of The Winchell Riots, and Mr G (guitar) to form the self titled band Dolittle, a band that reworked songs from Dolittle's previous career along with some covers and occasional new material. The band would play occasional gigs in small venues in the London area. Their first album Hello to the Fortunate Few was produced by Miles Hunt of The Wonder Stuff and released in 2006. A second album, The Irresistible Charm of Baby Owls was released in 2013. Dolittle disbanded in 2014 when EAT reformed.

=== EAT (mark 3) ===
On the 12th of June 2014 EAT announced via their Facebook page that they were reforming. This time the line-up would consist of Dolittle, Howard, Sewell, Moorshead and Malc Treece replacing Max Lavilla on guitar. They played two sold out shows over one weekend at The Half Moon in Putney, the second of which was recorded and released on Band Camp. In 2016 they released an EP of new material and played gigs at Moles in Bath and the Borderline in London before falling silent.

=== Holy Apes ===
In 2019 EAT's social media accounts started posting links to accounts under the name Holy Apes, Dolittle's latest project. With Malc Treece again on guitar it also included Rich Leicester (bass), Phil Carwardine (guitar) and James Pamphlion on drums. Having used crowdfunding to raise money to aid with distribution their album Listen To The Ape was released in 2020. Despite being lined up to play at the Shiiine On Weekender and also to support Jesus Jones in 2021, they were forced to pull out and no further plans have been announced.

== Personal life ==
Dolittle married on the 13th of July 1990

== Discography ==
=== Albums ===
With EAT:

- Sell Me a God (1989)
- Epicure (1993)

With Big Yoga Muffin

- Wherever You Go, There You Are (2000)

With We Know Where You Live

- It's Nice To Be Nice

With Dolittle

- Hello To The Fortunate Few
- The Irresistible Charm of Baby Owls

With Holy Apes

- Listen To The Ape
