= Lullabies in a Glass Wilderness =

Studio album by Lalleshwari
- Released: 17 December 2007
- Genre: Art pop; experimental; avant-folk; ambient pop; minimal wave; hypnagogic pop; freak folk; folktronica
- Length: 79:35
- Label: Self-released

Alternative cover
- Deluxe edition artwork (featuring CD and DVD)

Lullabies in a Glass Wilderness is a solo experimental, self-released album by English artist Katie Jane Garside, using the stage name Lalleshwari. She is also the frontwoman of Ruby Throat, and formerly of Queenadreena and Daisy Chainsaw. The name "Lalleshwari" is derived from an ancient Hindu poet.

== Recording ==
According to Garside's official website, the songs featured on Lullabies in a Glass Wilderness were recorded intermittently over a period of six years in 4-track format.

== Release and packaging ==
In addition to digital download, Lalleshwari/Lullabies in a Glasswilderness was released in a Digipak CD format, as well as a limited edition CD + DVD set of which only 300 copies were published. This included different artwork and packaging, a bonus DVD disc featuring short films, and an additional track titled "Play for Us". The first hundred copies featured Garside's handprint in purple paint, as well as her signature and the number out of 100. However, the tracks "Marybell (Rides into Town on a Pig)" and "In the Birdcage, Part 1" were only included in the regular edition.

The 'Lalleshwari' package offers unique artwork and lyrics presented in the form of a sketchbook. There are also pictures of Garside exclusive to the package and appear nowhere on the regular edition of the album, including an uncensored full frontal nude image. The first 100 limited edition versions of 'Lalleshwari' sold out within 24 hours, costing the buyer £35.

=== Bonus DVD ===
There are four films on the DVD itself:

1. In The Hallway
2. In The Bedroom
3. At The Window
4. In The Kitchen

'In the Hallway' features KatieJane at one end of a hallway as she proceeds to crawl on her hands and knees. The film is played back and forth rhythmically over and over again to give the feeling of perpetual movement without actually getting anywhere. The film is the longest and lasts 17 minutes and 13 seconds.

'In the Bedroom' is played in slow motion and has KatieJane dancing in the darkness of her room while holding a string of fairy lights that illuminate her body. The slow movement and eerie, droning background music make her seem very ethereal. KatieJane is almost naked in this video also, except for her knickers and shoes - but there is no provocative body language and the soft movement of the lights along with her body make her seem like a goddess. KatieJane has commented before that she hates clothes because they are constricting. The length of this film is 8 minutes and 33 seconds.

'At the Window' is simply white noise while Katiejane's voice sings softly over it. As within all the films so far, KatieJane is at the centre of the screen and little else around her is seen. There is only a single window surrounded by darkness in the video that gradually gets bigger. This episode is played in fast motion and KatieJane appears to be putting on a private show. This film again has a shorter length than the previous one, ending at 5 minutes and 18 seconds.

KatieJane is filmed through a window for 'In the Kitchen'. She does not face the camera and appears to be at a sink that we never see. Following the pattern, this last film is the shortest - lasting only 1 minute, 16 seconds. There is no music on this film, just a monologue from KatieJane echoing sentences such as "I thought maybe I should have done it/ I could have gone anywhere/ I could step sideways right now/ Shall I do that right now?/ What do you think?/ God will show me a sign/ I'll wait 'til I see a sign". Here KatieJane questions herself elaborately, and it seems as though she is talking about herself in that very moment because she almost has her back fully to the camera. KatieJane doesn't move from her position throughout the video which is a clear contrast between the previous three episodes where she moves and dances, exposed to the camera.

Each video is filmed in black & white and offers no interaction with other people, so the feeling of isolation (whether intentional or not) is quite potent.

The regular edition of the 'Lullabies in a Glass Wilderness' album is only available online, through KatieJane's website and MySpace.

== Critical response ==
Jen Dan of the independent music website Delusions of Adequacy wrote: "This album is neither sweepingly angelic or devilishly tormented–it’s more of a creep through the wild weeds, but it’s worth it for fans of KatieJane Garside’s work."

== Track listing ==
No.	Title	Length
1.	"Genica Pussywillow"	2:39
2.	"Roadkill"	4:39
3.	"Lesions in the Brain"	6:23
4.	"Marybell (Rides into Town on a Pig)"	3:41
5.	"Awaiting You"	5:28
6.	"Dark Angel"	4:37
7.	"Sleep Like Wolves"	4:32
8.	"Gaslight"	3:39
9.	"Too Busy Sinking"	5:20
10.	"Puppy Love"	3:37
11.	"For You I Hold My Breath"	3:47
12.	"Lost Upon the Flame"	3:52
13.	"Subterranean Values"	2:31
14.	"In the Birdcage, Part 1"	4:20
15.	"Just One Day of Endless Love"	18:36
16.	"Handheld Spoonfed"	1:54

== Personnel ==
- KatieJane Garside – vocals, programming, production
- Orson Wajih – guitar improvisation on "Lesions in the Brain"
- Steve Carter – electronics on "Dark Angel"
- Dominic Bouffard – guitar improvisation on "Sleeplikewolves"
- Maple Bee (Melanie Garside) – guitar on "For You I Hold My Breath"
- Ben Golomstock – instruments, production on "In the Birdcage, Part 1"
