= Live at the ICA =

Live album by Queenadreena
- Released: 22 September 2005
- Recorded: 22 March 2005
- Studios: Institute of Contemporary Arts, London
- Genres: Alternative rock; noise rock
- Length: 63:41
- Label: One Little Indian
- Producers: S. Barnacle; Crispin Gray

Queenadreena chronology
The Butcher and the Butterfly (2005)	Live at the ICA (2005)	Ride a Cock Horse (2007)

Live at the ICA is a live album by Queenadreena, released in September 2005, which includes songs from their first three albums. It was recorded at the Institute of Contemporary Arts in London on 22 March 2005. In April 2006, the Queenadreena Live DVD was released, featuring both the ICA show and a bonus show at the Astoria in London.

== Track listing ==
No.	Title	Writer(s)	Length
1.	"Medicine Jar"	KatieJane Garside; Crispin Gray; Melanie Garside; Pete Howard	3:53
2.	"In Red"	K. Garside; Gray; Howard	3:34
3.	"Join the Dots"	K. Garside; Gray; Howard	4:41
4.	"Cold Fish"	K. Garside; Gray	2:23
5.	"Pull Me Under"	K. Garside; Gray; Howard; Richard Adams	5:15
6.	"Wolverines"	K. Garside; Gray; Howard	4:42
7.	"Fuck Me Doll"	K. Garside; Gray; Howard	3:33
8.	"Princess Carwash"	K. Garside; Gray; Howard	4:09
9.	"Birdnest Hair"	K. Garside; Gray; M. Garside; Gill	3:58
10.	"Ascending Stars"	K. Garside; Gray; M. Garside; Howard	4:02
11.	"Pretty Like Drugs"	K. Garside; Gray; Orson Wajih	3:57
12.	"Razorblade Sky"	K. Garside; Gray	5:08
13.	"Suck"	K. Garside; Gray; Howard	4:07
14.	"Pretty Polly" (traditional)		7:24

Japanese bonus track
No.	Title	Writer(s)	Length
15.	"Kitty Collar Tight"	K. Garside; Gray	2:55

== Personnel ==
- KatieJane Garside – vocals
- Crispin Gray – guitar
- Paul Jackson – bass
- Pete Howard – drums
