= Indigo Vertigo =

- Cover of Indigo Vertigo by Daniel Schaffer

Publication information
- Publisher: Image Comics
- Format: One-shot
- Publication date: January 1, 2005
- No. of issues: 1

Creative team
- Created by: Daniel Schaffer; KatieJane Garside
- Written by: KatieJane Garside
- Artist: Daniel Schaffer

Indigo Vertigo is a 48-page graphic novella, written by KatieJane Garside and illustrated by Dogwitch creator, Daniel Schaffer. It was published by Image Comics in 2005.

Indigo Vertigo is marketed as "the hallucinatory spectacle of one woman's experience at the brink of reality," and described by a Warren Ellis quotation on the back cover as, "Like Sylvia Plath fucking David Lynch."

According to Schaffer, who acknowledges a heavy influence from Lynch (and also Japanese auteur, Shinya Tsukamoto), the book is an experiment in subjective storytelling, and came about as the result of an unconventional, intuitive creative process developed by himself and KatieJane Garside (best known as the former vocalist of London noise punk band Daisy Chainsaw and Noise Rock band Queenadreena, and current vocalist of neo-folk duo Ruby Throat.)

In an interview posted on comics news site The Pulse in 2005, Schaffer explains - "Indigo Vertigo is an attempt to connect to the reader by acknowledging the demons and empty spaces that are within everybody. If you're going to do something like that without pretension or agenda, you have to first expose the same thing from within yourself, and so this book is a glimpse of that truth, from the perspective of both Katie and myself, with a little bit of space for the reader. It's a book designed to reach out through example, and it will come alive if you bring something of yourself to it."
