= I Adore You (Queenadreena song) =

2000 single by Queenadreena

Single by Queenadreena

from the album Taxidermy
- B-side: "Weeds"
- Released: 28 February 2000
- Genre: Alternative rock; noise rock; gothic rock
- Length: 3:24
- Label: Blanco y Negro
- Songwriters: KatieJane Garside; Crispin Gray
- Producer: Ken Thomas

Queenadreena singles chronology
"Cold Fish" (1999)	"I Adore You" (2000)	"Jolene" (2000)

"I Adore You" is a song by English alternative rock band Queenadreena, released as their third single from their debut album Taxidermy (1999).

== Music video ==
A music video for the song was directed by Martina Hoogland Ivanow.

== Release ==
"I Adore You" was released as a CD single as well as on 10" vinyl. The CD single also features a music video for "I Adore You".

== Track listing ==
All tracks are written by KatieJane Garside and Crispin Gray.

No.	Title	Length
1.	"I Adore You"	3:24
2.	"Weeds"	3:32
Total length:		6:55

== Personnel ==
Musicians

- KatieJane Garside – vocals
- Crispin Gray – guitar, glockenspiel
- Orson Wajih – bass
- Billy Freedom – drums

Technical

- Ken Thomas – production, engineering
