= Pretty Like Drugs =

Single by Queenadreena

from the album Drink Me
- B-side: "Beneath The Skin"
- Released: 8 July 2002
- Genre: Alternative rock; noise rock
- Length: 4:00
- Label: Rough Trade, One Little Indian
- Songwriters: KatieJane Garside; Crispin Gray; Orson Wajih

Queenadreena singles chronology
| "Jolene" (2000) | "Pretty Like Drugs" (2002) | "FM Doll" (2002) |

"Pretty Like Drugs" is a song by British alternative rock band Queenadreena, released in 2002 from their album Drink Me. It was later included as a bonus track on the US release of the band's third album, The Butcher and the Butterfly after they left Rough Trade records and signed with One Little Indian.

== Reception ==
Nigel Messenger of Phase9 called the single: "an excellent, heavy track with a pounding beat saturated with the sexy tones of lead singer KatieJane Garside." Rock Feedback said of the single: "Snarly riffs and the sound of a girl in desperation, panting away like an exhausted farmyard animal, marks "Pretty Like Drugs," the shockingly post-glam stomper new single from Queen Adreena."

== Track listing ==
| No. | Title | Writer(s) | Length |
|---|---|---|---|
| 1. | "Pretty Like Drugs" | KatieJane Garside; Crispin Gray; Orson Wajih | 4:00 |
| 2. | "Beneath the Skin" | | 2:49 |

== Personnel ==
- KatieJane Garside – vocals
- Crispin Gray – guitar
- Orson Wajih – bass
- Pete Howard – drums
