= Medicine Jar (Queenadreena song) =

Single by Queenadreena

from the album The Butcher and the Butterfly
- B-side: "Seven Sins"
- Released: 31 May 2005
- Genre: Alternative rock; noise rock
- Length: 3:48
- Label: One Little Indian
- Songwriters: KatieJane Garside; Crispin Gray; Pete Howard; Melanie Garside
- Producer: Paul Corkett

Queenadreena singles chronology
"FM Doll" (2002)	"Medicine Jar" (2005)

"Medicine Jar" is a song by English alternative rock band Queenadreena, released as their final single from their third studio album, The Butcher and the Butterfly (2005). It was released both on compact disc and as a limited edition pink 7" vinyl record.

== Track listing ==
No.	Title	Writer(s)	Length
1.	"Medicine Jar"	KatieJane Garside; Crispin Gray; Pete Howard; Melanie Garside	3:48
2.	"Seven Sins"	K. Garside; Gray; Howard	3:02

== Personnel ==
Queenadreena

- KatieJane Garside – vocals
- Crispin Gray – guitar
- Melanie Garside – bass
- Pete Howard – drums

Technical personnel

- Paul Corkett – production
- Simon Davey – mastering
