= F.M. Doll =

- Original 2002 cover art

Single by Queenadreena

from the album The Butcher and the Butterfly
- B-side: "Kissing My Disgrace"
- Released: 18 November 2002
- Genre: Alternative rock; noise rock
- Length: 3:11
- Label: Rough Trade; One Little Independent
- Songwriters: KatieJane Garside; Crispin Gray; Pete Howard; John Orion
- Producer: Clive Goddard

Queenadreena singles chronology
"Pretty Like Drugs" (2002)	"F.M. Doll" (2002)	"Medicine Jar" (2005)

Alternative cover
- 2005 reissue by Rough Trade

"F.M. Doll" (originally titled "Fuck-Me Doll") is a song by English alternative rock band Queenadreena, first released as a standalone single in 2002 by Rough Trade Records. The track was later re-recorded and released both as a single and included on their third album, The Butcher and the Butterfly (2005) through One Little Independent, after the band had switched record labels. It peaked at number 81 on the UK Singles Chart in 2005.

The track is inspired by the 1996 unsolved murder of American child pageant competitor JonBenét Ramsey. The painting featured on the original 2002 single is by artist Simon Henwood.

== Composition ==
According to vocalist and songwriter KatieJane Garside, the song was inspired by JonBenét Ramsey. In a 2002 interview, she stated: "I know because of the lyrical content it won’t get on [the radio]. It's about child murder. Do you remember the JonBenét case in America? The child beauty queen who was supposedly murdered by her mother and father? It's about that and the endemic infection in the female psyche."

The lyrics of the song mention JonBenét Ramsey by name, and allude to stripping and sexual abuse.

== Release ==
The track was first released as a CD single on 18 November 2002 by Rough Trade Records.

It was re-recorded by the band and re-released as a 7" vinyl and CD by One Little Independent Records on 21 March 2005, as well as appearing on the band's third album, The Butcher and the Butterfly.

== Reception ==
Nick March of Drowned in Sound gave the single a positive review, writing: "When the 'FM Doll' charges out of the stereo speakers, it greets your eardrums with a "we-didn't-come-to-fuck-around" urgency. This puppy's a re-recorded version of an earlier release that's been beefed up a bit, so it's worth adjusting your aural settings accordingly. You should either listen to it at bloody-murder volume or turn it off."

The South Wales Argus, reviewing the 2005 reissued single, wrote: "Garside's version of events is told with lots of high-pitched screaming suggesting hair tearing from head and plenty of equally harsh guitar riffing plus impromptu bursts of manic percussion. It's typical of the type of dark subjects and lurid presentation enjoyed by Queen Adreena who've been described as one half Hole, the other Kate Bush." Contactmusic.com echoed a similar sentiment in their review, noting: "This three-minute train wreck from ultra-fierce psycho-punks Queen Adreena is a ride from Satan’s own backyard amusement park. That is to say; if it’ll scare the Dark One, it’ll scare anyone."

== Track listing ==
2002 UK CD single (RTRADESCD071)

1. "FM Doll" (KatieJane Garside, Crispin Gray, Pete Howard) – 3:11
2. "Kissing My Disgrace" (Garside, Gray, Orson Wajih) – 3:18

2005 UK CD and 7" singles (465TP7CD, 465TP7)

1. "FM Doll" (Garside, Gray, Howard) – 3:08
2. "Kissing My Disgrace" (Garside, Gray, Wajih) – 3:13

== Personnel ==
Queenadreena

- KatieJane Garside – vocals
- Crispin Gray – guitar
- Melanie Garside – bass guitar
- Pete Howard – drums

Art direction

- Simon Henwood – painting (front cover)

Technical personnel

- Clive Goddard – production ("FM Doll")
- Jason Harris – engineering
- Ken Thomas – mixing, production ("Kissing My Disgrace")

== Chart positions ==
Chart (2005)	Peak position
UK Singles Chart	81
