= X-ing Off the Days =

Single by Queenadreena

from the album Taxidermy
- B-side: "A Heavenly Surrender"
- Released: 1 November 1999
- Genre: Alternative rock; noise rock; gothic rock
- Length: 4:25
- Label: Blanco y Negro
- Songwriter: Crispin Gray
- Producer: Ken Thomas

Queenadreena singles chronology
"X-ing Off the Days" (1999)	"Cold Fish" (1999)

"X-ing Off the Days" is a song by English alternative rock band Queenadreena, released as their second single from their album Taxidermy (2000).

== Release ==
"X-ing Off the Days" was released as a CD single by Blanco y Negro records in 1999.

== Track listing ==
No.	Title	Writer(s)	Length
1.	"X-ing Off the Days"	Crispin Gray	4:25
2.	"A Heavenly Surrender"	KatieJane Garside	3:32
Total length:			7:57

== Personnel ==
Musicians

- KatieJane Garside – vocals
- Crispin Gray – guitar
- Orson Wajih – bass
- Billy Freedom – drums

Technical

- Ken Thomas – production, engineering
- Head – recording
