= Eleventeen =

Eleventeen may refer to:

- Eleventeen (EP), 1996 EP by Eve 6
- Eleventeen (album), 1992 Album by Daisy Chainsaw
- Eleventeen, 2021 album by Lee Kerslake
- "Eleventeen", song from the album I'm Sorry That Sometimes I'm Mean by Kimya Dawson
