= Ride a Cock Horse (album) =

Ride A Cock Horse

Studio album by Queenadreena
- Released: 11 March 2008
- Recorded: 1999
- Genre: Alternative rock; noise rock; gothic rock
- Length: 38:23
- Label: Imperial (Japan)
- Producer: Queenadreena

Queenadreena chronology
Live at the ICA (2005)	Ride A Cock Horse (2008)	Djin (2008)

Ride A Cock Horse is an independently released compilation album by English rock band Queenadreena, sold exclusively through their MySpace profile in 2008. It contains 4-track demos of songs that were intended to be released on their 2000 debut album, Taxidermy. The album takes its name from the nursery rhyme "Ride a cock horse to Banbury Cross".

== Release ==
The album was made available through MySpace, and subsequently released as a limited edition compact disc in Japan by Imperial Records, featuring a bonus DVD of live concert footage.

== Track listing ==
All tracks are written by KatieJane Garside and Crispin Gray

No.	Title	Length
1.	"Bridgit"	3:45
2.	"I Adore You"	3:21
3.	"Falling Star"	2:30
4.	"Where Me and the Vultures Live"	1:43
5.	"Gopee Snowpea"	2:53
6.	"Soda Dreamer"	3:42
7.	"Spider Spider"	3:00
8.	"Ride the Airwave"	3:14
9.	"Somewhere Upstairs"	2:41
10.	"Ladybird"	3:08
11.	"Swim Into Me"	3:35
12.	"Hotel Aftershow (Part 1)"	4:50
13.	"Summer's Coming, Summer's Gone"	0:56
14.	"Sleeping Pill (Part 2)"	0:48

Japanese bonus tracks
No.	Title	Length
16.	"Mother Tongue"	3:24
17.	"Mary Magdalene"	2:35

Japanese bonus DVD (live, Le Plan, 3 November 2005)
No.	Title	Writer(s)	Length
1.	"Birdnest Hair"	K. Garside; M. Garside; Gill; Gray
2.	"In Red"	Garside; Gray; Howard
3.	"Suck"	Garside; Gray; Howard
4.	"Wolverines"	Garside; Gray; Howard
5.	"Jolene"	Dolly Parton

== Personnel ==
- KatieJane Garside – vocals
- Crispin Gray – guitar
- Nomi Leonard – bass
- Pete Howard – drums
