= The Dogbones =

UK musical group

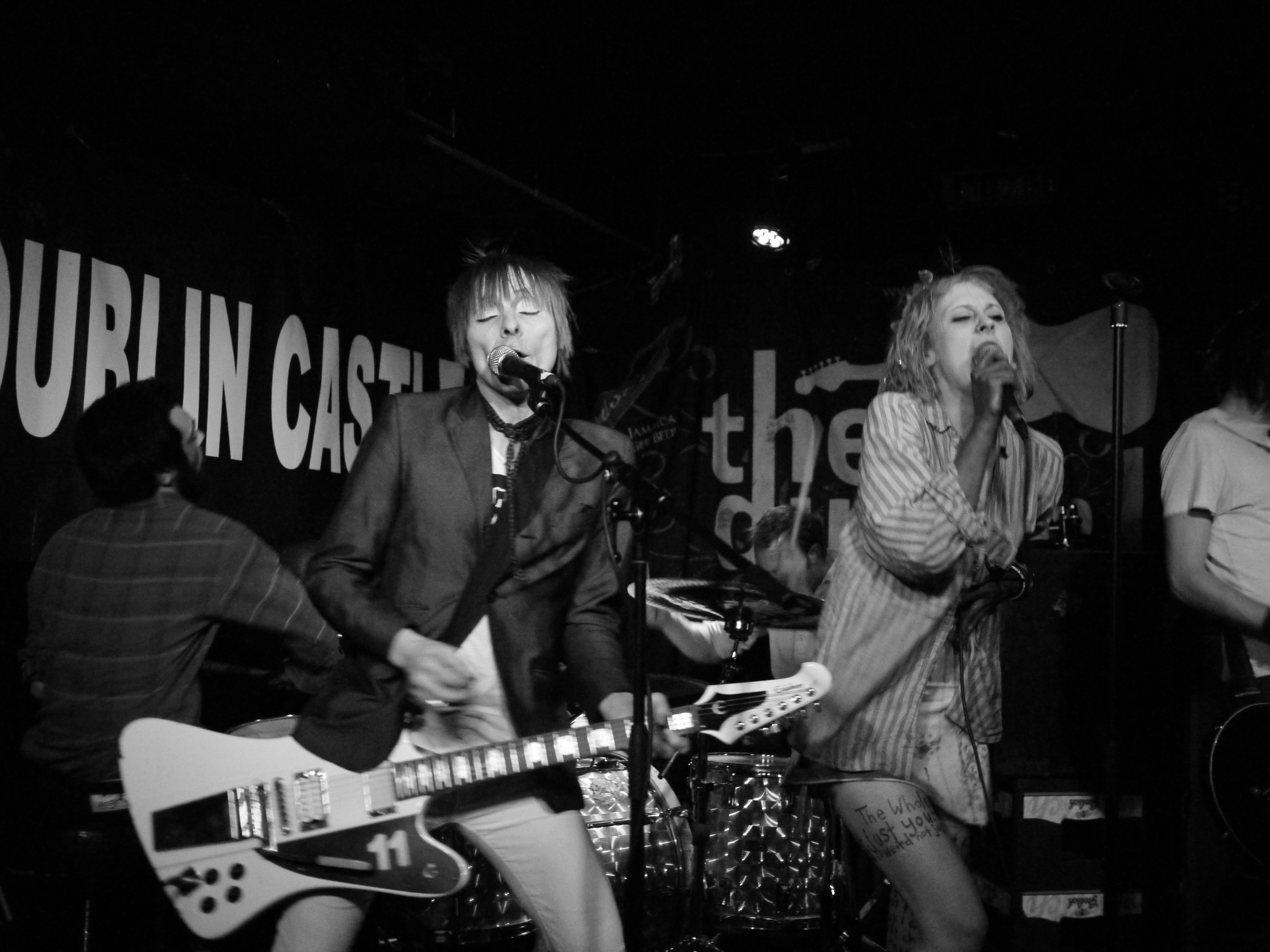
- The Dogbones performing in 2010

Background information
- Years active: 2007–2015
- Spinoff of: Queenadreena, Daisy Chainsaw
- Members: Nomi Leonard - vocals and guitar Johnny Orion - guitar, vocals and bass Michael Vakalis - bass guitar Vince Johnson - drums
- Past members: Joao Pires; Matt Banham; Angus Duprey - all 2nd drummers
- Website: http://thedogbones.com

The Dogbones are an alternative rock band that were formed in London, in late 2007. All of the four founding musicians are former members of Daisy Chainsaw and Queenadreena, notable bands of the London alternative scene.

== History ==
The Dogbones were founded by Crispin Gray (a.k.a. Johnny Orion), a former guitarist of Daisy Chainsaw and Queenadreena who at the end of 2007 gathered other members of those two bands. Nomi Leonard, who played on bass in Queenadreena, took vocals and guitar along with Crispin Gray, while Michael Vakalis was on bass and Vince Johnson on drums.

The Dogbones usually do not show their former affiliations, however, and they used numericals on the sleeves of their releases for identifying the musicians. Crispin Gray always uses his middle names alias Johnny Orion in relation to The Dogbones.

The band were well known for using two drummers set in their live shows, with Vince Johnson being the primary drummer. Joao Pires (ex Selfish Cunt), the original second drummer in The Dogbones, was replaced circa June 2011 by Matt Banham. Angus Duprey (GOiD) replaced Matt in late February/early March 2013. The principal drummer Vince Johnson took over sole drumming duties circa February 2014.

Their self-titled debut album was released in October 2010 in the UK through the band's own label Buzz Saw and distributed by Cadiz Music. In The Independent, Simon Price described the sound as "a seductively scuzzy, drum-heavy mix of ramshackle voodoo rock, chaotic glam-punk and shouty grrl music".

The album was released earlier in Japan in March 2010 through 51 records with different artwork and a demo bonus track, 'Stitch'. It also features the English-language version of 'Ley Line' (the 'Aneurin' version on the UK release is in Welsh).

In support of the album The Dogbones released two vinyl singles. The first one, "Mae Dy Ffrindiau i Gyd (Am Dy Ladd Di)" (B side: "Gwlad Ar Fy'n Nghefn"), a 7" split single, is released in August 2010 jointly by The Dogbones and Klaus Kinski label and available through Ankst Music, distributed by Shellshock. The second one, "I want Alcohol" (B side: "Monkey"), again a 7" vinyl single, is released in November 2010, through Custom House Records.

The band have published initially three music videos along with their debut album: Hey Chihuahua (2012), The Whole World is Weird (2011) and All Your Friends (Are Going to Kill You) (2011). Another two videos were released with tracks from their still unpublished second album. Everybody Thinks You're Strange (2013) was animated entirely by Crispin Gray and “Got To Get Out of Here” (2014) features visual extracts from various Georges Méliès films: The Merry Frolics of Satan (1906), Le Voyage dans la Lune (1902), and La Royaume des fées (1903). As of 2015, The Dogbones have been on a mysterious hiatus, and both Gray and Vakalis are currently active in the indie rock band Starsha Lee.

== Discography ==
=== Singles ===
- Gwlad ar Fy Nghefn/Mae Dy Ffrindiau i Gyd (Am Dy Ladd Di), August 2010, (Ankst Music, Shellshock Records)
  7" split single with Klaus Kinski
- I want Alcohol, November 2010, (Custom House Records)

=== Albums ===
- The Dogbones, October 2010, (Buzz Saw, Cadiz Music)

=== Videos ===
- All Your Friends (Are Going to Kill You) (2011)
- The Whole World is Weird (2011)
- Hey Chihuahua (2012),
- Everybody Thinks You're Strange (2013)

== Members ==
=== Current line-up ===
The band's line-up at present is:

- Johnny Orion – Vocals and Guitar (Daisy Chainsaw, Vapid Dolly, Dizzy Q Viper, Queenadreena)
- Nomi Leonard – Vocals and Guitar (Wendykurk, Queenadreena)
- Michael Vakalis – Bass (briefly in Queenadreena, Jesus Got His Gun)
- Vince Johnson – Drums (Daisy Chainsaw, Dizzy Q Viper, Mediæval Bæbes)

=== Past members ===
- Joao Pires - second drummer (Selfish Cunt)
- Angus Duprey - second drummer (GOiD)
- Matt Banham - second drummer
