= Ventriloquist (disambiguation) =

A ventriloquist is a person who practices ventriloquism.

Ventriloquist or The Ventriloquist may refer to:

- Ventriloquist (character), a DC Comics character
- The Ventriloquist (album), a 2007/2008 album by Ruby Throat
- The Ventriloquist, a 2012 short film produced by Dana Brunetti and starring Kevin Spacey
- "Ventriloquist", a song by +/- from the 2003 album You Are Here
- "Ventriloquist", a song by James Marriott from the 2025 album Don't Tell the Dog
- "The Ventriloquist", an episode of Strange Experiences
