= Daniel Schaffer =

British writer and artist

Dan Schaffer
- Born: February 3, 1969 (age 57)
- Occupations: Writer, artist, screenwriter
- Notable work: Dogwitch, Indigo Vertigo, The Scribbler

Dan Schaffer (born 3 February 1969) is a British writer/artist working primarily in comics and film. He is best known as the writer and illustrator of cult comic book series, Dogwitch. He is also the co-creator/artist of Indigo Vertigo, a collaboration with Queenadreena / Daisy Chainsaw singer Katiejane Garside, and writer/artist of the original graphic novel The Scribbler.

Comics

- Dogwitch: Direct to Video – writer/artist (Sirius Entertainment)
- Dogwitch: Twisted – writer/artist (Sirius Entertainment)
- Dogwitch: Mood Swings – writer/artist (Image Comics)
- Indigo Vertigo – artist (Image Comics)
- The Scribbler – writer/artist (Image Comics/1First Comics)
- Killdarlings – writer/artist (1First Comics)
- White – writer/artist (1First Comics)
- Malefic – writer (1First Comics)
- Dogwitch: The Whole Shebang – writer/artist (1First Comics)
- Peripheral – writer (1First Comics)

Films

- Doghouse (2009) – screenwriter. Directed by Jake West, starring Stephen Graham
- The Scribbler (2014) – screenwriter. Directed by John Suits, starring Katie Cassidy, Garret Dillahunt, Eliza Dushku and Gina Gershon
- Peripheral (2019) – screenwriter. Directed by Paul Hyett, starring Hannah Arterton, Tom Conti
- Electric Meat (2026) – director, screenwriter. Starring Caspian Faye, Emily Booth, Nina Courson, Jasmine Sumner and Sylvia Soska
- White (upcoming) - screenwriter. Directed by Jake West, starring Carla Woodcock, Kate Beckinsale, Katherine McNamara, Roxy Striar
