= Cold Fish (song) =

Single by Queenadreena

- Vinyl cover artwork

Single by Queenadreena

from the album Taxidermy
- B-side: "Yesterday's Hymn"
- Released: 1999
- Genre: Alternative rock; noise rock; gothic rock
- Length: 2:09
- Label: Blanco y Negro
- Songwriter(s): KatieJane Garside; Crispin Gray
- Producer(s): Ken Thomas

Queenadreena singles chronology
"X-ing Off the Days" (1999)	"Cold Fish" (1999)	"I Adore You" (2000)

"Cold Fish" is a song by English alternative rock band Queenadreena, released as their lead single from their debut album Taxidermy (2000).

== Release ==
"Cold Fish" was released as a CD single as well as a limited edition 5" picture disc vinyl.

== Track listing ==
All tracks are written by KatieJane Garside and Crispin Gray

No.	Title	Length
1.	"Cold Fish"	2:09
2.	"Yesterday's Hymn"	3:06
Total length:		5:15

== Personnel ==
Musicians

- KatieJane Garside – vocals
- Crispin Gray – guitar
- Orson Wajih – bass
- Billy Freedom – drums

Technical

- Ken Thomas – production, engineering
- Head – recording
