= Daniel Schafer =

Daniel Schafer may refer to:

- Daniel Joseph Schafer, Detroit-Nashville musician, songwriter, recording artist
- Dan Vapid, Dan Schafer, Chicago based punk rock musician better known as his stage name
- Daniel Schaefer, former U.S. Representative from Colorado
- Daniel Schaffer, British writer/artist
