= Dogwitch =

Publication information
- Publisher: 1First Comics; Sirius Entertainment
- No. of issues: 18
- Main character(s): Violet Grimm; Ralph; Dolores

Creative team
- Created by: Daniel Schaffer
- Written by: Daniel Schaffer
- Artist: Daniel Schaffer

Collected editions
- Dogwitch: Direct to Video: ISBN 978-1579890629
- Dogwitch: Twisted: ISBN 978-1579890759
- Dogwitch: Mood Swings: ISBN 978-1582409528
- Dogwitch Omnibus: The Whole Shebang: ISBN 978-1618551313

Dogwitch is a comic book series by British artist and writer Daniel Schaffer following the shocking exploits of exiled witch-superstar and home movie maker, "Shrieking" Violet Grimm.

== Plot ==
From the official website:

"Banished deep into the evil Banewoods for daring to practice her own unique brand of Molotov Magick, outcast Dogwitch Violet Grimm continues to stretch the boundaries of accepted 21st Century witchcraft. As tales of bad sex and dangerous voodoo spread her infamy through the Banewoods, Violet captures the attention of a multitude of weirdos and resigns herself to what she believes is her predestined B-movie lifestyle. Churning out provocative home videos for a berserk and hungry fan base in her pursuit of arcane knowledge, she feeds her diary with the dating rituals of the sick and heinous. Violet is the Garbo of witches, a reclusive legend in a depraved, gory, funny and fiendishly sexy world."

== Cast ==
- Violet Grimm: "Her people expelled her...Her neighbours don't like her...Her fans want to kill her...So why do they all keep buying her movies? Violet Grimm is an exiled fetish-witch superstar, strung out from spell abuse, psychic fallout and the dubious attention of her psychotic fans. A single girl with a bad rep in a bad world, this infamous outcast just wants to practice her art and find some decent intimacy...Guess she probably shouldn't have made all those kinky home videos then."
- Ralph: An animated stuffed toy, Ralph is the cameraman for Violet's movies.
- Dolores: A hideously scarred doll. In the beginning the audience is left to assume that Dolores is another doll brought to life by Violet, but later in the story she reveals to Ralph that she was once a human witch and had her soul imprisoned in a doll for reasons not revealed to the audience, but was apparently disgusting enough to cause Ralph to vomit when shown a vision.
- Mr. Kinky: A suave, 21st-century demon. He quickly becomes Violet Grimm's boyfriend.

== Publication ==
Dogwitch debuted in 2002, published by Sirius Entertainment. Schaffer produced Dogwitch for three years, releasing eighteen bi-monthly issues.

As well as the regular comic book, Schaffer also released one-shots and portfolios such as Dogwitch: Special Features which collected Dogwitch-related original pin-up art, sketches and 'deleted scenes.'

Schaffer ended the series in 2005 to work on other projects.

=== Collected editions ===
The entire series is collected in three trade paperbacks:

- Direct to Video - Collecting issues #1-6. Introducing Violet Grimm, an arcane snuff movie superstar, and her weird and wonderful cohorts, Ralph, Dolores, and Mr. Kinky, not to mention deranged fans, frisky zombies, and screaming habdabs. Introduction by two-time Bram Stoker Award winner, Michael A. Arnzen.
- Twisted - Collecting issues: #7-12. Violet's wild and crazy life spirals out of control in this 144-page trade paperback, as she confronts tentacled demons, bloodthirsty bunnies, and a traitorous doll! Includes new pin-up artwork and a letter to the editor by Katiejane Garside.
- Mood Swings - Collecting issues #13-18. Violet Grimm is heading back to the Nice Bunny World to unravel a cosmic conspiracy and face off with those responsible for banishing her to the Banewoods. Violet's coming home, and she's going to bring a little chaos to The Order. Introduction by film director, Jake West.

The afterword for the second Dogwitch trade paperback was written by musician Katiejane Garside whom Schaffer also collaborated with on the project Indigo Vertigo.

With the completion of the series, the entire collection is available in Dogwitch: The Whole Shebang, with a special introduction by the Soska Sisters.

== Merchandise ==
Dogwitch merchandise exists in myriad forms, including posters, tee-shirts and even Dogwitch-themed shot glasses.
