= Geiger Counter (album) =

- Official vinyl and CD artwork

Studio album by Liar, Flower
- Released: 20 April 2020
- Recorded: 2019
- Genres: Art rock; folk; freak folk
- Length: 48:57
- Label: One Little Independent

Alternative cover
- Digital release artwork

Geiger Counter is the debut album of Liar, Flower, a musical project formed by English singer-songwriter KatieJane Garside and American guitarist Chris Whittingham, who have also released material as the duo Ruby Throat. Its title refers to a Geiger counter, an instrument used to detect ionizing radiation. The album was released in April 2020 by One Little Independent Records.

Recorded after Garside and Whittingham returned from an extensive sailing excursion, Geiger Counter was met with largely favorable critical reviews, and was named the "album of the week" by LA Weekly in May 2020. It was made available digitally as well as in vinyl LP and CD editions.

== Recording ==
Garside and her partner Chris Whittingham recorded the album after an extensive sailing excursion spanning the Galápagos and Marquesas Islands, New Zealand, Australia, Mauritius, South Africa, and the Azores. According to Garside, "We recorded a lot of this through improvisation. Chris would come up with a drum loop and a riff. We would just play against the drum loop and record for an hour or hour-and-a-half... Then Chris did a little bit of chopping around. There were a couple of little fixes, but it was all there. I take a sense of happiness from that because there's always the raw real that comes out in the initial writing. That's so hard to recapture when you've known the song, and you've rehearsed it a hundred times, and you're taking it into the studio for the fifth time."

== Promotion and release ==
The album was released by One Little Independent Records on 20 April 2020, as a double vinyl/CD combination pack with additional handmade artwork including two signed framable prints, a pressed flower in glassine, and a comic art book, limited to 500 sets. On 1 May 2020, the album was made available for digital download and streaming on various platforms. On 28 April 2020, it was included in a playlist for All Songs Considered by Bob Boilen on NPR.

A standard edition double vinyl LP was released on 8 July 2020.

== Critical reception ==
Professional ratings
Review scores
Source	Rating
LA Weekly	(favorable)
The Line of Best Fit	6/10 stars

Brett Callwood of LA Weekly named it the album of the week on 12 May 2020, writing: "These 12 songs are a full journey. Wistful, delicate thoughtfulness gives way to pain, and then turns full circle again. You hear elements of Kate Bush, then Portishead then Björk. It's like we've been allowed in Garside's head for a good rummage through her psyche for a while." Jedd Beaudoin of PopMatters praised the album, writing that it "sounds unlike any other record you'll hear this year. Though even veteran artists offer occasional clues to their influences, crumbs of what lies at the center of their musical DNA, this is something that seems to have appeared virtually from nowhere, unaffected by contemporary sounds or concerns and yet entirely of them."

Chris Ball of the music review site Echoes and Dust called the album " a work of revelation, purge and covenant... You may find it's the noisy tracks that reel you in at first but the quality of the folkier numbers won't take long to become apparent." The independent entertainment website Total Ntertainment described the album as "Stylistically varied, [ranging] from raw, bewildering, venomous rock to gentle folk musings." The Scotsman's Fiona Shepard wrote: "With characteristic disregard for the zeitgeist, Garside and her guitarist partner Chris Whittingham emerge from long-term self-imposed isolation on their sailboat home just as the rest of the world reckons with [COVID-19 pandemic] lockdown. But Geiger Counter suggests little has changed in Garside's unhinged musical world. She is a woman of many voices from childlike gurgle to feral screech, which she unleashes on grungey tantrums and unsettling lullabies played on autoharp, with a diversion into the gothic vaudeville."

Writing for The Line of Best Fit, Tyler Kelly described the record: "Fleeting between honeyed infantile melodies, lascivious drawling, and guttural death rattles; Geiger Counter is a serpentine delirium dream conjured by Garside and Whittingham in their perpetual state of isolation whilst living out at sea."

== Track listing ==
All tracks are written by KatieJane Garside and Chris Whittingham, except where noted.

No.	Title	Writer(s)	Length
1.	"I Am Sundress (She Of Infinite Flowers)"	KatieJane Garside	5:18
2.	"My Brain Is Lit Like An Airport"		4:29
3.	"9N - AFE"		4:03
4.	"Mud Stars"		4:26
5.	"Broken Light"	Garside	3:02
6.	"Even Though The Darkest Clouds"		3:00
7.	"Blood Berries"		4:01
8.	"Little Brown Shoe"		3:48
9.	"Baby Teeth"		4:33
10.	"Hole In My Hand"		5:05
11.	"Geiger Counter"	Garside	4:35
12.	"Doors Locked, Oven's Off"	Chris Whittingham	2:04
Total length:			48:57

Limited edition vinyl bonus tracks
No.	Title	Writer(s)	Length
13.	"White Paint On Field"		5:53
14.	"Fire At Bone Girl Hotel"	Garside	4:52

== Personnel ==
- KatieJane Garside – vocals, autoharp, production
- Chris Whittingham – guitar, drums, percussion, production
