= Epicure (album) =

Studio album by EAT
- Released: 14 June 1993
- Genre: Odd Rock
- Label: Fiction Polydor

EAT chronology
Sell Me a God (19899)	Epicure (1993)

Singles from Epicure
- 1. "Golden Egg EP" Released: 1992; 2. "Shame" Released: 5 October 1992; 3. "Bleed Me White" Released: 1993

Epicure is the second studio album by the British alternative rock band Eat. After the release of their debut album Sell Me a God, Eat had all but split up. A year later they reformed without guitarist brothers Max Noble and Paul Noble and having recruited Jem Moorshead and Max Lavilla to replace them they toured with The Wonder Stuff and Kingmaker in December 1991 before going out on their own headline tour. The line up changes led to a change in sound with the bluesy style of Sell Me a God having been replaced by a more psychedelic pop rock sound.

== Release and reception ==
The first music released from the album were the songs Golden Egg and Belly Town which featured on the Golden Egg EP released in June 1992. The band toured the UK in May and June in support of this new music.

Epicure was released on the Fiction Records label on the 14 June 1993.

Reviews were mostly on the positive side if slightly neutral. Select Magazine reviewer Dave Morrison described it as "EAT's difficult second album" and "a convincing return" rating it 3/5. Q Magazine's Mat Snow was critical of its sound, calling it "a mid-point between guitar-driven trad-rock and more layered synthesized fare" and stating that "Ange Dolittle's stage charisma does not fully translate to record" but was more positive about the track "Fist" 3/5. Johnny Dee of the NME gave the album a 6 and called it "an erratic offering" while praising tracks like "Bleed Me White", "Shame", "First Time Love Song" and "Golden Egg" but was less positive about "Tranquilliser".

The single, "Bleed Me White", reached number 73 on the UK singles chart.

== Track listing ==
All tracks written by Dolittle, Howard, Lavilla, Moorshead, Sewell

1. Belly Town – 4:18
2. Shame – 3:48
3. First Time Love Song – 3:32
4. Tranquilliser – 4:13
5. Golden Egg – 5:17
6. Bottle Blue – 4:56
7. Fecund – 4:26
8. Baby in Flares – 3:35
9. Fist – 5:28
10. Bleed Me White – 4:02
11. Out People – 4:08
12. Epicure – 5:10
- Tracks 1, 5 produced by Chris Kimsey, engineered by Jeremy Wheatley
- Tracks 2, 7, 9 produced by Tim Smith, engineered by Jeremy Wheatley
- Tracks 3, 8 produced and engineered by Mark Saunders
- Tracks 4, 6, 11 produced by Tim Smith, engineered by Finn Steele
- Track 10 produced by EAT and Mark Saunders, engineered by Mark Saunders
- Track 12 Produced by EAT and Tim Smith, engineered by Finn Steele
- Mixed by Mark Saunders and Chris Parry
- Tracks 1, 2, 5 remixed by Mark Saunders and Chris Parry

== Personnel ==
- Ange Dolittle – front, back and side voices, gob iron
- Pete Gertie Howard – drum, pert percussion, gert back voices
- Jem Moorshead - guitar, back voices
- Max Lavilla - guitar, Spanish mumbling
- Tim Sewell – bass guitar, back voices
