= Paul Smernicki =

Paul Smernicki is one of the founders of the relaunched Fiction Records, along with Joe Munns and Jim Chancellor. Smernicki is now Director of Digital for Universal Music UK, and also a member of the band South Playground, along with Christian Dailly, a Rangers football player.
