= The Ventriloquist (album) =

Studio album by Ruby Throat
- Released: 2007
- Genre: Alternative rock; indie folk
- Length: 1:07:26
- Label: Sleeplikewolves (CD); The Lovers' Will Records & Press (limited LP)
- Producer: Chris Whittingham

The Ventriloquist is an album by Ruby Throat, a musical act consisting of Katiejane Garside (frontwoman of Queen Adreena) and Chris Whittingham. It was released on 8 November 2007 on a limited run of only 500 copies. This consisted of books bound from Indian vintage red leather, the CD in a cloth pocket in the back of the book. Another limited version of 400 copies was released on January 16, 2008, this time in a regular jewelled case and a 4-panel CD booklet. There was a worldwide general release later in 2008, but "Marybell" was replaced on this edition by two new tracks, "Consuela's Newt" and "Boat Song." An official limited edition run of 300 gatefold double vinyl LPs were issued in Spring 2010 by Los Angeles–based label, The Lovers' Will Records & Press.

== Track listing ==
1. Swan and the Minotaur (Troubled Man)
2. House of Thieves
3. Naked Ruby
4. Salto Angel
5. Dear Daniel
6. The Ventriloquist
7. Lie to Me
8. Ghost Boy
9. John 3.16
10. Happy Now
11. Marybell (Rides Into Town On A Pig) [Bonus track on the special edition copies]

== International Release: Bonus tracks ==
11. Consuela's Newt
12. Boat Song

== Vinyl Edition ==
Side A
1. Swan and the Minotaur (Troubled Man)
2. House of Thieves
3. Naked Ruby
4. Salto Angel

Side B
1. Dear Daniel
2. The Ventriloquist
3. Lie to Me

Side C
1. John 3.16

Side D
1. Ghost Boy
2. Happy Now pt. 2
3. Consuela's Newt
4. Boat Song

Katiejane Garside website
