= Eat (band) =

British alternative rock band

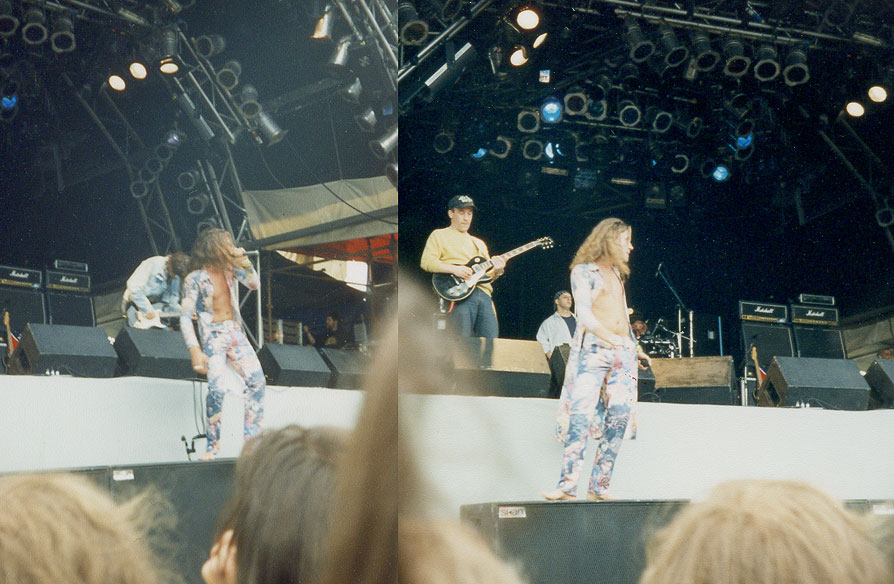
- Eat at Glastonbury Festival 1993

Background information
- Origin: Bath/London, England
- Genres: Alternative rock
- Years active: 1986–1995, 2014–2017
- Label: Fiction Records
- Members: Ange Dolittle; Pete Howard; Tim Sewell; Jem Moorshead; Malc Treece
- Past members: Paul Noble; Max Noble; Max Lavilla

Eat were a British five-piece alternative rock band active between 1986 and 1994. They released two albums and several EPs through Fiction Records, the label best known for its association with The Cure and operating at the time as an imprint of Polydor Records. The band achieved moderate success in the UK but gained limited recognition internationally. They later reunited from 2014 to 2017.

== History ==
=== 1986-1990: formation, Sell Me a God and the departure of the Noble brothers ===
Eat were formed in Bath in 1986 by drummer Pete Howard (who had been in The Clash from 1983 to 1986), bassist Tim Sewell, guitarist songwriter Paul Noble, his guitarist brother Max Noble and vocalist Ange Dolittle. They relocated to Kings Cross in London where they would organise their own shows in the midst of the late '80s London rave scene and Tim and Paul would DJ at parties held by the Mutoid Waste Company. The band’s experiences with homelessness and squatting led to them supporting the charity Shelter. Their early sound was variously described as "spaghetti western metal and bluesy funk", "urban blues", a "collage of dip-bag funk and punk, urban blues and Cajun" and by themselves, as a reaction to the press trying to pigeon hole them, as Swampadelia. Their live shows during this period often received positive reviews in the music press. John Dingwall writing in Record Mirror wrote "Are Eat likely to harness this killer noise so that it makes commercial sense?" while Keith Cameron in Sounds (magazine) wrote that they "are totally demon live".

In December 1988 Eat signed with Fiction Records and released the Autogift EP in the following January followed by the Plastic Bag EP in June which was single of the week in Sounds (magazine). These were followed by a single of their cover of The Lovin’ Spoonful’s ‘Summer in the City’. During this period they undertook tours of Europe with The Jesus and Mary Chain and Phillip Boa, as well as UK gigs with the likes of The Wonder Stuff and Ned's Atomic Dustbin

Their debut album, the critically acclaimed ‘Sell Me a God’ was released in October 1989.

The non-album double A-side single Psycho Couch/Alien Detector, released September 1990 on the Non Fiction label, was record of the week in the NME and featured on the short lived revival of the TV show Juke Box Jury where DJ Alan Freeman said it could be a hit but the rest of the panel disagreed. Eat undertook a short UK tour in support of this single in October 1990. By the time this tour concluded Eat were already several weeks into recording a second studio album that was scheduled for release the following February. The band all but split up in November 1990 due to internal conflicts and alleged drug problems and the album was never released. At this time, Paul Noble and Max Noble permanently split from the rest of Eat.

=== 1991-1994: reformation, Epicure and break up ===
After the departure of the Noble brothers the remaining members of Eat entered a period of convalescence for several months. Eventually Dolittle, Howard and Sewell "were back together, escaping to Spain with a drum machine, a new guitarist Jem Moorshead and a handful of ideas". On returning to the UK they auditioned for another guitarist and eventually found American Max LaVilla. With the change in personnel came a change in the band's sound "Gone are the old strains of 'Urban Blues' and in comes a rejuvenated vision of wide-angled rock" wrote Steve Lamacq in the NME.

By December 1991 Eat were back performing live at various venues across the UK as a support act to The Wonder Stuff. The first material released by the new line-up was the Golden Egg EP in June 1992. The November 1992 issue of Select Magazine came with a free sampler tape of bands on the Polydor label, featuring the Eat song "Fecund".

Eat's second album 'Epicure' was released on 14 June 1993 to positive if not enthusiastic reviews but has retrospectively been called "one of the decade's greatest rock albums that no one's heard".

In the late spring and early summer of 1994, Eat embarked on a tour of America with the band Medicine. They split up after returning to the UK.

=== 2014-2017: reunion and She Cries Flowers ===
On 12 June 2014 Eat announced through their social media accounts that they were to reform. The line-up for this latest incarnation would be Dolittle, Howard, Sewell, Moorshead and Malc Treece of The Wonder Stuff replacing Max LaVilla on guitar. The reunion would begin with two sold out shows at The Half Moon in Putney on Saturday the 14th and Sunday 15 October 2014. A live recording of the Sunday night was made available to purchase on Eat's Bandcamp page.

Over the next few years Eat would play occasional shows at venues such as the Borderline in London, Moles in Bath and the Shiiine On Weekender at Butlin's Minehead. In December 2016, Eat self released the EP 'She Cries Flowers' containing their first new recorded material for over 20 years. More gigs followed in 2017 after which all activity has ceased.

== Other Projects ==
Paul and Max Noble formed U.V. Ray who released The Suitcase EP in 1991 and subsequently T.V. Eye in 1992, who featured a pre-'Dennis Pennis' Paul Kaye on lead vocals and recorded Killer Fly (1993), featuring new recordings of two previously unreleased EAT tracks as B-sides, for Go! Discs.

Paul Noble and Louis Jones from T.V. Eye went on to form Warm Jets, while Max Noble emerges from time to time with The Blue Aeroplanes.

Ange Dolittle went on to form We Know Where You Live with members of The Wonder Stuff and later formed Big Yoga Muffin with Pim Jones of Hipsway. In 2019 he formed the band Holy Apes with Malc Treece.

In 2019 Pete Howard and Tim Sewell joined The Wonder Stuff

== Discography ==
Album chart placing shown is from the UK Indie Chart.

=== Albums ===
- Sell Me a God (1989) (#10)
- Epicure (1993)

=== Singles and EPs ===
- "Skin" (Autogift EP) (1989)
- "Mr And Mrs Smack" (Plastic Bag EP) (1989)
- "Tombstone" (1989)
- "Summer in the City" (1989)
- "Psycho Couch / Alien Detector" (1990) UK #124
- "Golden Egg" (1992)
- "Shame" (1992)
- "Bleed Me White" (1993) UK #73
- "She Cries Flowers" (2016)

=== Official bootlegs ===
- Trabant Tape (1990)
