= Electric Meat =

- Directed by: Dan Schaffer
- Written by: Dan Schaffer
- Starring: Caspian Faye; Emily Booth; Nina Courson; Jasmine Sumner; Sylvia Soska
- Release date: 28 August 2026 (FrightFest)
- Running time: 95 minutes
- Country: United Kingdom
- Language: English

Electric Meat is a 2026 British horror film written and directed by Dan Schaffer. The film stars Caspian Faye, Emily Booth, Nina Courson, Jasmine Sumner and Sylvia Soska.

== Plot ==
A photographer spirals into madness after adopting a murdered model as his new muse, when she decides that she does not want to remain dead.

== Production ==
Schaffer described the film as an exploration of the creative process and artistic obsession. The film was made in black and white and uses limited dialogue, with its visual style and atmosphere forming a significant part of its storytelling.

== Release ==
Electric Meat had its world premiere at Tubi FrightFest in London on 28 August 2026.

== Reception ==
Film Threat described Electric Meat as a surreal and expressionistic horror film, discussing its combination of photography, sexuality, obsession and artistic failure. The publication gave the film a score of 6 out of 10.

UK Film Review awarded the film two out of five stars and discussed its black-and-white presentation, absence of spoken dialogue and emphasis on imagery and atmosphere.

SciFiNow described the film as a disturbing examination of the creative process and discussed its expressionistic imagery and portrayal of artistic obsession.

FilmHounds described the film as bold and experimental, while discussing its visual style and influences.

Cut to the Take discussed the film's depiction of the relationship between the photographer and the murdered model, as well as its themes concerning artistic ambition and the commodification of women.

== Cast ==
- Caspian Faye as the Butcher
- Emily Booth as the Landlady
- Nina Courson as Lush
- Jasmine Sumner as Calliope
- Sylvia Soska as Phaedra
