= Baby Darling Taporo =

- Digital release artwork

Studio album by Ruby Throat
- Released: 9 November 2017 (CD); 2 March 2018 (digital)
- Label: Sleep Like Wolves

Ruby Throat chronology
O' Doubt O' Stars (2012)	Baby Darling Taporo (2017)

Baby Darling Taporo is the fourth studio album by the neofolk duo Ruby Throat. Promotional music videos were produced for the album including "Hu'u" and "Also Elizabeth, Daughter of the Above."

== Recording ==
The album was recorded by vocalist KatieJane Garside and guitarist Chris Whittingham during a voyage around the Marquesas Islands, Niue, Kingdom of Tonga, New Zealand, Saint Helena, and the Azores.

== Release ==
Baby Darling Taporo was released 2 March 2018 on digital, as well as a limited edition 500 copy CD pressing sold by Garside her official website on 9 November 2017.

== Track listing ==
No.	Title	Length
1.	"Tablecloth"	4:44
2.	"Mother Seagull"	2:42
3.	"Paper Plane"	3:21
4.	"Shipping Container"	3:54
5.	"Also Elizabeth, Daughter of the Above"	5:23
6.	"Beche De Mere"	3:23
7.	"No. 5 Island"	2:49
8.	"Telephone Mast"	6:15
9.	"Hu'u"	7:21
10.	"White Sun"	6:30
11.	"The Rake"	4:19
