= Eleventeen (album) =

Studio album by Daisy Chainsaw
- Released: October 6, 1992
- Genres: Alternative rock; noise rock
- Length: 40:45
- Label: One Little Indian
- Producers: Ken Thomas, KatieJane Garside

Daisy Chainsaw chronology
Eleventeen (1992)	For They Know Not What They Do (1994)

Singles from Eleventeen
- 1. "Love Your Money" Released: 1991; 2. "Pink Flower / Room Eleven" Released: 1992; 3. "Hope Your Dreams Come True" Released: 1992

Eleventeen is the debut album by UK alternative rock band Daisy Chainsaw, released in 1992. It was their only album with KatieJane Garside as lead vocalist. It peaked the UK Albums Chart at No. 62. Three songs from the album were released as singles. "Love Your Money" was the biggest hit, reaching No. 26 in the UK Singles Chart, while follow-up "Pink Flower" was a UK No. 65. In 2014 Buzzsaw Records announced a double CD special edition of Eleventeen, which is available on daisychainsaw.net.

== Critical reception ==
Professional ratings
Review scores
Source	Rating
AllMusic	4/5 stars

The Washington Post wrote that the band "follows Garside's Yoko Ono-ish vocal contortionism and Crispin Gray's squalling guitar to the outer edges of the song form."

== Track listing ==
No.	Title	Writer(s)	Length
1.	"I Feel Insane"	Crispin Gray	2:41
2.	"You Be My Friend"	Gray	2:52
3.	"Dog with Sharper Teeth"	Gray	3:06
4.	"Hope Your Dreams Come True"	Gray	4:46
5.	"Natural Man"	Gray	2:46
6.	"Love Your Money"	Gray	2:41
7.	"Lovely Ugly Brutal World"	Gray; Katie Jane Garside	2:40
8.	"Use Me Use You"	Gray	3:29
9.	"The Future Free"	Gray	1:52
10.	"Pink Flower"	Gray	4:09
11.	"Waiting for the Wolves"	Gray	5:34
12.	"Everything Is Weird"	Gray	4:18

Special Edition Bonus Tracks - Disc One (2014)
No.	Title	Length
13.	"Child Star"	3:02
14.	"Use Me Use You (Version)"	1:39

Special Edition Bonus Tracks - Disc Two (2014)
No.	Title	Writer(s)	Length
1.	"Get Real Pleasure"	Gray	3:53
2.	"Sick of Sex"	Gray	2:12
3.	"All the Kids Agree"	Gray	2:23
4.	"Room Eleven"	Gray; Richard Adams; Garside; Vince Johnson	7:16
5.	"Hope Your Dreams Come True (EP Version)"	Gray	4:19
6.	"Propeller Punch"		1:23
7.	"Queue for Transatlantic Alien"		2:43
8.	"You Be My Friend (Alternate)"	Gray	2:59
9.	"Violence from Love"		3:55
10.	"The Future Free (Alternate Mix)"	Gray	1:59
11.	"Natural Man (Version)"	Gray	2:35
12.	"I Feel Insane (Alternate Mix)"	Gray	2:33
13.	"My Confusion"		2:54
14.	"Waiting for the Wolves (Alternate Mix)"	Gray	5:33
