= The Butcher and the Butterfly =

Studio album by Queenadreena
- Released: 23 May 2005 (UK); 25 October 2005 (U.S.)
- Recorded: 2004
- Genres: Noise rock; blues rock; alternative rock
- Length: 59:14
- Labels: One Little Indian; Imperial
- Producer: Paul Corkett

Queenadreena chronology
Drink Me (2002)	The Butcher and the Butterfly (2005)	Live at the ICA (2005)

Singles from The Butcher and the Butterfly
- 1. "FM Doll" Released: 2002; 2. "Medicine Jar" Released: 6 June 2005

The Butcher and the Butterfly is the third studio album by English alternative rock band Queenadreena, released in May 2005 though One Little Indian and Imperial Records. The album features writing from frontwoman KatieJane Garside, guitarist Crispin Gray, and drummer Pete Howard, as well as contributions from Garside's sister, Melanie Garside, who also plays bass on the album. Richard Adams, the bassist of Garside and Gray's former band, Daisy Chainsaw, also has a co-writing credit on one track.

== Composition ==
Queenadreena began working on their third studio album, which became The Butcher and the Butterfly, as early as 2002 with the release of the controversial "FM Doll" (originally titled "Fuck Me Doll") which alludes to child beauty pageants and the 1996 murder of JonBenét Ramsey; the single was released as a stand-alone single under Rough Trade Records whilst the band was touring in promotion for their second studio album, Drink Me. After they were dropped from Rough Trade, the band continued to work on the album, and the slightly-retitled "FM Doll" was re-released on 21 March 2005 as the album's lead single.

== Release ==
In March 2004, the band performed several new songs from the record at a show in Nottingham.

The Butcher and the Butterfly was released in May 2005 and failed to chart in any territories. "Medicine Jar" was released as the album's second single in June 2005. The single's b-side, "Seven Sins", appeared as a bonus track on the Japanese release of the album. The US edition of the album differs significantly from releases in other territories; "Razorblade Sky" and "Pretty Like Drugs" from Drink Me are featured, while "Princess Carwash (Slight Reply)", "Cold Light of Day", and "Butcher and the Butterfly" are omitted.

The album was issued on double 180g vinyl by One Little Indian in 2018.

== Reception ==
Helen Tipping of Pennyblackmusic gave the album a positive review, while noting that the album "doesn’t make for easy listening, neither the dark subject matter nor much of the music."

== Track listing ==
No.	Title	Writer(s)	Length
1.	"Suck"	KatieJane Garside; Crispin Gray; Pete Howard	3:19
2.	"Medicine Jar"	K. Garside; Melanie Garside; Gray; Howard	3:48
3.	"Ascending Stars"	K. Garside; M. Garside; Gray; Howard	4:21
4.	"Join the Dots"	K. Garside; M. Garside; Gray; Howard	4:22
5.	"Pull Me Under"	K. Garside; Richard Adams; Gray; Howard	4:23
6.	"Racing Towards The Sun"	K. Garside; Gray; Howard	2:43
7.	"Wolverines"	K. Garside; Gray; Howard	4:26
8.	"Birdnest Hair"	K. Garside; M. Garside; Andy Gill; Gray	3:55
9.	"Princess Carwash"	K. Garside; Gray; Howard	3:58
10.	"In Red"	K. Garside; Gray; Howard	3:20
11.	"FM Doll"	K. Garside; Gray; Howard	3:19
12.	"Blackspring Rising"	K. Garside; Gray; Howard	3:38
13.	"Childproof"	K. Garside; M. Garside	3:37
14.	"Princess Carwash (Slight Reply)"	K. Garside; Gray; Howard	4:09
15.	"Cold Light of Day"	K. Garside; Adams; Gray; Howard	3:04
16.	"Butcher and the Butterfly"	K. Garside; B. Howard; J. Norton; J. Wood	3:51

Japanese bonus track(s)
No.	Title	Writer(s)	Length
17.	"Seven Sins"	K. Garside; Gray; Howard	3:04

US Edition
No.	Title	Writer(s)	Length
1.	"Suck"	K. Garside; Gray; Howard	3:19
2.	"Medicine Jar"	K. Garside; M. Garside; Gray; Howard	3:48
3.	"Pretty Like Drugs"	K. Garside; Gray; Orson Wajih	4:00
4.	"Join the Dots"	K. Garside; M. Garside; Gray; Howard	4:22
5.	"Ascending Stars"	K. Garside; M. Garside; Gray; Howard	4:21
6.	"Pull Me Under"	Adams; K. Garside; Gray; Howard	4:23
7.	"Wolverines"	K. Garside; Gray; Howard	4:26
8.	"Racing Towards The Sun"	K. Garside; Gray; Howard	2:43
9.	"Princess Carwash"	K. Garside; Gray; Howard	3:58
10.	"Birdnest Hair"	K. Garside; M. Garside; Gill; Gray	3:55
11.	"In Red"	K. Garside; Gray; Howard	3:20
12.	"FM Doll"	K. Garside; Gray; Howard	3:19
13.	"Blackspring Rising"	K. Garside; Gray; Howard	3:38
14.	"Childproof"	K. Garside; M. Garside	3:37
15.	"Razorblade Sky"	K. Garside; Gray	4:25

== Personnel ==
Queenadreena

- KatieJane Garside – vocals
- Crispin Gray – guitar
- Melanie Garside – bass
- Pete Howard – drums

Technical personnel

- Paul Corkett – production
