= Drink Me (Queenadreena album) =

Studio album by Queenadreena
- Released: 24 June 2002
- Recorded: 2001
- Genre: Alternative rock; noise rock
- Length: 38:18
- Label: Rough Trade/One Little Indian
- Producer: Morgan Nicholls; Ken Thomas; Queenadreena

Queenadreena chronology
| Taxidermy (2000) | Drink Me (2002) | The Butcher and the Butterfly (2005) |

Drink Me is the second studio album by English alternative rock band Queenadreena, released in 2002. Since the band switched labels from Rough Trade to One Little Indian, the album became out of print and has become somewhat of a collector's item. The original British pressing of the album featured a controversial hidden image in the jewel casing. One Little Indian records have stated that there are no plans to re-release the album.

== Critical response ==
Drowned in Sound awarded the album seven out of ten stars, writing: "[Queenadreena] break the mould in one sense at least – it’s as much Garside’s star qualities as her not-entirely-unattractive deranged and semi-dressed demeanour that carries the group. But for all her unhinged charisma, there is one major problem with ‘Drink Me’–the rest of the band back Garside with an awful slosh of uninspired turgid sub-metal shite that nearly sank [the band] without a trace first time around. And with the exception of the bulldozing "Pretty Like Drugs" underpinning and a few more startling riffs scattered like afterthoughts, that’s simply a let down." Rock Feed Back magazine awarded the album three out of four stars, adding: "Don't allow the opening torrents of 70s-esque heavy-metal riffage falsely lead you; Queenadreena are dangerously sexy art-rock, a group free to roam the lyrical subject-matters others are too refined to touch, and an act confident enough to lead you down their dark alley of forbidden delights - without so much as even a mere inkling of embarrassment."

== Track listing ==
| No. | Title | Writer(s) | Length |
|---|---|---|---|
| 1. | "Pretty Like Drugs" | KatieJane Garside; Crispin Gray; Orson Wajih | 4:00 |
| 2. | "Kitty Collar Tight" | Garside; Gray | 2:37 |
| 3. | "Siamese Almeida" | Garside; Gray | 3:15 |
| 4. | "Razorblade Sky" | Garside; Gray | 4:26 |
| 5. | "Sleeping Pill" | Garside; Gray; Pete Howard | 3:18 |
| 6. | "A Bed Of Roses" | Garside; Gray; Howard | 1:59 |
| 7. | "My Silent Undoing" | Garside; Gray | 3:19 |
| 8. | "Desert Lullaby" | Garside; Gray; Wajih | 4:42 |
| 9. | "Under A Floorboard World" | Garside; Gray | 2:52 |
| 10. | "Hotel After Show" | Garside; Gray; Wajih | 3:08 |
| 11. | "For I Am The Way" | Garside; Gray | 4:36 |
| Total length: | | | 38:18 |

== Singles ==
Pretty Like Drugs (CD, Rough Trade, 2002)

1. "Pretty Like Drugs" (Garside, Gray, Wajih)
2. "Beneath The Skin" (Garside, Gray)

== Personnel ==
Queenadreena

- KatieJane Garside – vocals
- Crispin Gray – guitar
- Orson Wajih – bass
- Pete Howard – drums

Technical personnel

- Morgan Nicholls – production
- Ken Thomas – production
- Queenadreena – production
