= Sell Me a God =

Studio album by Eat
- Released: 1989
- Genre: Alternative rock
- Label: Fiction/Polydor
- Producer: Eat, Phill Brown

Eat chronology
Sell Me a God (1989)	Epicure (1993)

Sell Me a God is the 1989 debut album by the British alternative rock band Eat. Prior to the album's release, the band members had all been homeless, with a few of them squatting at London King's Cross railway station.

== Production ==
The music on Sell Me a God encompasses a variety of styles, including blues, hip-hop, and funk

== Release and reception ==
Professional ratings
Review scores
Source	Rating
AllMusic	4/5 stars
Orlando Sentinel	5/5 stars

The album reached No. 10 on the UK Indie Chart. The album failed to gain much popularity outside of the UK. David Toop, writing for The Times described it as an "impressive" debut. The Orlando Sentinel praised "the altered-state guitars and the biting irony lurking in the lyrics."

Doug Brod, writing for Trouser Press, described the album as a "most impressive debut", writing that the diverse influences on the album "created an instantly familiar record that ultimately sounds like no one else". According to Ira Robbins, also from Trouser Press, it was "grossly underappreciated".

Martin Aston of Music Week was complimentary about the three EPs that Eat had released to this point and wrote of the album "Eat's "urban blues" style mashes up several known and proven ingredients - punk, funk, swamp, bomp, psych - but comes out with something quite at odds with this year's working models" and went on to say "too frayed for hard rockers, too bluesy for indie circles, Eat may fall between a rock and a hard place but offer up a challenge and a raging brew in the process.

Sell Me a God was released on CD, MC and vinyl, with the CD and MC release adding three bonus tracks, including a cover of "Summer in the City" by the Lovin' Spoonful.

== Track listing ==
All tracks composed by Eat

1. "Tombstone" – 2:53
2. "Electric City" – 4:02
3. "Fatman" – 4:50
4. "Stories" – 2:42
5. "Walking Man" – 3:51
6. "Skin" – 4:43
7. "Red Moon" – 5:49 (bonus track on CD and MC release)
8. "Insect Head" – 5:24
9. "Body Bag" – 5:04
10. "Things I Need" – 4:14
11. "Judgement Train" – 4:12
12. "Gyrate" – 6:06 (bonus track on CD and MC release)
13. "Summer in the City" – 3:30 (bonus track on CD and MC release)
14. "Mr & Mrs Smack" – 5:03

== Personnel ==
- Tim Sewell – bass guitar, synthesizer, backing vocals
- Pete Howard – drums, percussion
- Max Noble – guitar, percussion
- Paul Noble – guitar, percussion, backing vocals
- Ange Dolittle – vocals, harmonica
