= Ruby Throat =

British neofolk musical duo

- Origin: London, England, United Kingdom
- Genres: Neofolk; experimental folk; alternative rock
- Years active: 2007–present
- Label: Sleep Like Wolves
- Members: KatieJane Garside; Chris Whittingham
- Website: rubythroat.co.uk

Ruby Throat is a British neofolk musical duo formed in 2007 by English vocalist KatieJane Garside and American guitarist Chris Whittingham. The duo were formed during the dissolution of Garside's former band, Queenadreena, and have recorded four studio albums. In 2020, Garside and Whittingham released music together under the name "Liar, Flower".

== History ==
Ruby Throat formed in 2007 during the time in which KatieJane Garside's band Queenadreena was in stages of dissolution. Garside met Whittingham, an American from Hawaii while he was busking at a train platform in the London Underground, and asked him to collaborate with her on a musical project.

Known for the hard-edged musical aesthetic of Garside's former bands Daisy Chainsaw and Queenadreena, Garside sought a stripped down, folk-oriented sound when forming Ruby Throat, with many of the duo's songs being based around acoustic guitar, and evoking a folk noir sound.

The duo's first release was The Ventriloquist (2007). The album was well-received, and critics drew comparisons to the work of PJ Harvey and others. PopMatters said of the album: "Garside’s breathy, nearly childlike voice is the dominant element of The Ventriloquist, gentle acoustic guitars and lap steels setting the stage for her voice. Despite the somber lyrical themes, this is a clear heir to the lineage of ethereal makeout albums like those from Mazzy Star and the Cocteau Twins."

This was followed by a Tour EP and Out of a Black Cloud Came a Bird (2009), their second studio album, which featured a cover of "Nothing" by Townes Van Zandt. To promote the record, the duo embarked on their first tour of the United States, performing shows in New York City, Oregon, California, and Washington.

In 2012, they released their third studio album, O' Doubt O' Stars, which was written and recorded while the duo were sailing on the Lea River and North London waterways. PopMatters said of the album: "Beginning with the quietly devastating epic "Stone Dress", it's clear that O' Doubt O' Stars is aiming for something uncompromising and original. The fact that it succeeds in accomplishing this as much as it does is no small feat and makes it worthy of any accolades it will (and should) receive." Each of the group's releases have receive hand-crafted packaging, artwork, and sometimes personal handwritten lyrics and other accompaniments from Garside.

Garside and partner Whittingham spent 2012 living on their yacht, Iona. In 2014 they released a new song, a cover of "Secret Fires" by The Gun Club, which appeared on the third Jeffrey Lee Pierce Sessions compilation Axels & Sockets. It was announced on 1 August 2014 that Ruby Throat's fourth album would be called Baby Darling Toporo, eventually released in 2017.

Ruby Throat released Stone Dress in 2018, a compilation of some of the band's favorite tracks from the last 4 albums along with a bonus CD titled Liar, Flower. The duo went on to release the 2020 album Geiger Counter under the new moniker Liar, Flower.

== Discography ==
=== Studio albums ===
Title	Album details
The Ventriloquist	Released: 22 November 2007; Formats: CD, LP, digital download; Label: Sleep Like Wolves
Out of a Black Cloud Came a Bird	Released: 13 November 2009; Formats: CD, digital download; Label: Sleep Like Wolves
O' Doubt O' Stars	Released: 17 September 2012; Formats: CD, digital download; Label: Sleep Like Wolves
Baby Darling Taporo	Released: 9 November 2017; Formats: CD, digital download; Label: Sleep Like Wolves

=== Extended plays ===
Title	Album details
Tour E.P.	Released: 2009; Formats: CD; Label: Independent

=== Compilation albums ===
Title	Album details
Stone Dress	Released: 9 November 2018; Formats: CD, double LP, digital download; Label: One Little Indian

=== Singles ===
Title	Year	Album
"House of Thieves"	2008	The Ventriloquist
"Stone Dress"	2012	O' Doubt O' Stars
"Also Elizabeth, Daughter of the Above"	2018	Baby Darling Taporo
"Dog Song"	2018	Stone Dress
"Broken Light"	2018	Broken Light (Single)

== Members ==
- KatieJane Garside – vocals
- Chris Whittingham – backing vocals, guitar, mandolin, lap steel guitar, sitar
