= Djin (album) =

Studio album by Queenadreena
- Released: 8 October 2008
- Studio: The Cowshed, London, England
- Genre: Noise rock; blues rock; alternative rock
- Length: 60:08
- Label: Imperial
- Producer: Teo Miller

Queenadreena chronology
Ride a Cock Horse (2007)	Djin (2008)

Alternative cover
- Japanese artwork

Djin is the fourth and final studio album by English alternative rock band Queenadreena. The album was originally released exclusively in Japan in October 2008, where it became the band's most commercially successful album to date, peaking at #120 on the Oricon Albums Chart. The album was later released in the UK in September 2009. Djin was re-released in a limited edition, gatefold double neon pink vinyl set by Cadiz Music & Digital on 16 April 2021. The reissue included additional new demo tracks and a previously unheard song “Heaven Doesn't Wait,” co-written and recorded with the late Andy Gill from Gang of Four.

== Critical response ==
Alan Severa of AllMusic awarded the album four out of five stars, referring to it as Queenadreena's "masterpiece, balancing all their characteristically mercurial elements on the solid basis of the mastery of an accomplished band, which was left by the media to grow at its own pace." Sputnikmusic awarded the album a 4.0 "excellent" rating, noting: "Djin is an album that is very consistent with the band's previous work. It is a very catchy "garage/noise rock" album with some great dirty punk riffs and solos complimented [sic] with an amazing and unique female voice."

The independent music site Delusions of Adequacy wrote: "Djin is full of the balls-out, sleazy, filth ridden tracks you’d expect from the band... There’s more sophistication on this album also, and more desire to experiment, with some of the songs being noticeably longer than they have been on previous offerings... Overall, this is a much more mature offering, whilst not losing any of the energy the band are known for."

== Track listing ==
Original edition
No.	Title	Writer(s)	Length
1.	"Year (Of You)"	KatieJane Garside; Crispin Gray; Pete Howard; Nomi Leonard	3:51
2.	"Angels"	Garside; Gray; Howard; Leonard	3:56
3.	"Killer (Tits)"	Garside; Gray; Howard	3:46
4.	"Night Curse"	Garside; Gray	5:05
5.	"Lick"	Garside; Gray; Howard	3:20
6.	"Crows"	Garside; Gray; Howard; Leonard	3:12
7.	"You (Don't Love Me)"	Garside; Gray; Howard	8:05
8.	"Ruby"	Garside; Gray; Howard	5:08
9.	"Happy Now"	Garside; Gray; Howard	4:50
10.	"Life (Support)"	Garside; Gray; Howard; Leonard	6:07
11.	"Heaven (No More) (Don't Look Down)"	Garside; Gray; Howard; Leonard	5:28

Japanese bonus track(s)
No.	Title	Writer(s)	Length
12.	"Come Down"	Garside; Gray; Howard; Leonard	2:53

Japanese bonus DVD: Live 2008.3.4 Astro Hall
No.	Title	Writer(s)	Length
1.	"In Red"	Garside; Gray; Howard
2.	"Cold Fish"	Garside; Gray
3.	"Medicine Jar"	Garside; Gray; Melanie Garside; Howard
4.	"Pretty Like Drugs"	Garside; Gray; Orson Wajih
5.	"Pretty Polly"	Traditional
6.	"Birdnest Hair"	K. Garside; Gray; M. Garside; Gray

UK bonus track(s)
No.	Title	Writer(s)	Length
9.	"Pretty Fish (Turn Pink)"	Garside; Gray	3:11

Limited edition
No.	Title	Writer(s)	Length
1.	"Year (Of You)"	Garside; Gray; Howard; Leonard	3:51
2.	"Angel"	Garside; Gray; Howard; Leonard	3:56
3.	"Killer (Tits)"	Garside; Gray; Howard	3:46
4.	"Night Curse"	Garside; Gray	5:05
5.	"Lick"	Garside; Gray; Howard	3:20
6.	"Crows"	Garside; Gray; Howard; Leonard	3:12
7.	"You (Don't Love Me)"	Garside; Gray; Howard	8:05
8.	"Ruby"	Garside; Gray; Howard	5:08
9.	"Pretty Fish (Turn Pink)"	Garside; Gray	3:11
10.	"Happy Now"	Garside; Gray; Howard	4:50
11.	"Life (Support)"	Garside; Gray; Howard; Leonard	6:07
12.	"Heaven (No More) (Don't Look Down)"	Garside; Gray; Howard; Leonard	5:28
13.	"Come Down"	Garside; Gray; Howard; Leonard	2:53
14.	"Carry You Through Fire"	Garside; Gray	4:16
15.	"Life Support" (Demo)	Garside; Gray	5:04

Double vinyl edition
No.	Title	Writer(s)	Length
1.	"Year (Of You)"	Garside; Gray; Howard; Leonard	3:48
2.	"Angels"	Garside; Gray; Howard; Leonard	3:54
3.	"Killer (Tits)"	Garside; Gray; Howard	3:44
4.	"Night Curse"	Garside; Gray	5:02
5.	"Lick"	Garside; Gray; Howard	3:18
6.	"Crows"	Garside; Gray; Howard; Leonard	3:09
7.	"You (Don't Love Me)"	Garside; Gray; Howard	8:03
8.	"Ruby"	Garside; Gray; Howard	5:06
9.	"Pretty Fish (Turn Pink)"	Garside; Gray	3:08
10.	"Happy Now"	Garside; Gray; Howard	4:48
11.	"Life (Support)"	Garside; Gray; Howard; Leonard	6:05
12.	"Heaven (No More) (Don't Look Down)"	Garside; Gray; Howard; Leonard	4:24
13.	"Last Leaf Upon The Tree"		4:47
14.	"Fifteen Second Itch"		2:46
15.	"Close Your Eyes"		2:55
16.	"Heaven Doesn't Wait" (Demo with Andy Gill from Gang of Four)
17.	"Blackspring Rising" (Alternate Version)		4:08
18.	"Princess Carwash"		3:07
19.	"Darling, Time's Ticking Away" (Demo, Lead Vocal – Crispin)		3:29
20.	"Heaven No More" (Demo, Alternate Version, Lead Vocal – Crispin)		2:47
21.	"Pull Me Under" (Alternate Version)		4:37

CD reissue
No.	Title	Writer(s)	Length
1.	"Year (Of You)"	Garside; Gray; Howard; Leonard	3:48
2.	"Angels"	Garside; Gray; Howard; Leonard	3:54
3.	"Killer (Tits)"	Garside; Gray; Howard	3:44
4.	"Night Curse"	Garside; Gray	5:02
5.	"Lick"	Garside; Gray; Howard	3:18
6.	"Crows"	Garside; Gray; Howard; Leonard	3:09
7.	"You (Don't Love Me)"	Garside; Gray; Howard	8:03
8.	"Ruby"	Garside; Gray; Howard	5:06
9.	"Pretty Fish (Turn Pink)"	Garside; Gray	3:08
10.	"Happy Now"	Garside; Gray; Howard	4:48
11.	"Life (Support)"	Garside; Gray; Howard; Leonard	6:05
12.	"Heaven (No More) (Don't Look Down)"	Garside; Gray; Howard; Leonard	4:24
13.	"Heaven Doesn't Wait" (Demo with Andy Gill from Gang of Four)		4:08
14.	"Last Leaf Upon The Tree"		4:47
15.	"Close Your Eyes"		2:55
16.	"Fifteen Second Itch"		2:46
17.	"Pull Me Under" (Version)		4:44
18.	"Blackspring Rising" (Version)		3:31

== Personnel ==
Queenadreena

- KatieJane Garside – vocals
- Crispin Gray – guitar
- Nomi Leonard – bass
- Pete Howard – drums

Technical personnel

- Teo Miller – production, mixing

== Charts ==
Chart (2008)	Peak position
Japanese Albums Chart	120
