= Taxidermy (Queenadreena album) =

Studio album by Queenadreena
- Released: 17 April 2000
- Recorded: 1999
- Studio: Orinoco, London, England
- Genre: Alternative rock; noise rock; gothic rock
- Length: 47:41
- Label: Warner Bros.
- Producer: Ken Thomas; Queenadreena

Queenadreena chronology
Taxidermy (2000)	Drink Me (2002)

Professional ratings
Review scores
Source	Rating
Kerrang!	4/5 stars
NME	7/10

Taxidermy is the debut album by English alternative rock band Queenadreena, released in 2000. The enhanced-CD release includes a short film by Martina Hoogland-Ivanow involving time-lapse photography and dream-like visuals.

== Release ==
Taxidermy was released in the United Kingdom on compact disc which features a short film by Martina Hoogland-Ivanow, and as a 12" vinyl LP.

== Critical reception ==
NME wrote of the album: "while carrying on Daisy Chainsaw's predilection for rock as infantile nightmare, here the scope is much wider than a one-track take on banshee pop. There are some obvious precedents, notably Björk and PJ Harvey, but much more than either of those two reference points, this debut album is frequently akin to eavesdropping on psychotherapy."

== Track listing ==
No.	Title	Writer(s)	Length
1.	"Cold Fish"	KatieJane Garside; Crispin Gray	2:08
2.	"Soda Dreamer"	Garside; Gray	3:39
3.	"I Adore You"	Garside; Gray	3:24
4.	"Yesterday's Hymn"	Garside; Gray	3:04
5.	"Pretty Polly" (traditional)		5:10
6.	"Yemaya"	Garside; Gray	2:48
7.	"Madraykin"	Garside	3:58
8.	"X-ing Off the Days"	Gray	4:21
9.	"Hide from Time"	Garside; Carter	4:39
10.	"Friday's Child"	Garside; Gray	3:09
11.	"Sleepwalking"	Garside; Gray	4:22
12.	"Are the Songs My Disease?"	Garside; Gray	3:23
13.	"Weeds"	Garside; Gray	3:29

Taxidermy – Japanese deluxe edition
No.	Title	Writer(s)	Length
14.	"A Heavenly Surrender"	Garside	3:33
15.	"Pray for Me"	Garside	1:35

== Singles ==
- "X-ing Off the Days" (1999)
- "Cold Fish" (1999)
- "Jolene" (2000)
- "I Adore You" (2000)

== Personnel ==
Queenadreena

- KatieJane Garside – vocals, arrangement (5)
- Crispin Gray – guitar, glockenspiel, harmonica, backing vocals, arrangement (5)
- Dizzy Q – bass
- Steve Drew – drums

Technical personnel

- Ken Thomas – production
- Queenadreena – production
