= Fiction Records =

British record label

- Parent company: Universal Music Group
- Founded: 1978; 48 years ago
- Distributor: Virgin Music Group
- Genre: Post-punk; alternative rock
- Country of origin: United Kingdom
- Official website: fictionrecords.co.uk

Fiction Records is a British record label founded by Chris Parry in 1978, owned by Universal Music Group and based in the United Kingdom. It is best known for being the home of the Cure for over 20 years. It was originally a part of Polydor, but in January 2014, Universal restructured Fiction as a standalone label, removing it from Polydor's corporate affiliation. Fiction repertoire is now released internationally through Virgin (ex-North America).

== History ==
Fiction Records was founded in the late 1970s by Polydor A&R man and longtime Cure manager Chris Parry, alongside music publisher Fiction Songs Ltd, who went on to found Radio X (then XFM). Both were subsidiaries of Polydor Records, and based in London at 97 Charlotte Street and eventually maintained a satellite office in New York City at 850 7th Ave. Fiction was also home to UK dance label Desire, re-launched in 1988 as Fiction's house subdivision, and Non Fiction Records, Fiction's specialty label for special editions. Fiction was best known for the Cure's releases and achieved its first UK No. 1 album in 1992 with the Cure's Wish; the album's lead single "Friday I'm in Love" also topped Billboard's Modern Rock chart. Additionally, Fiction was home to other artists who signed to the publishing company as well as the record label and released a number of acclaimed albums including Eat's Sell Me a God (Fiction/Polydor) in 1989, the God Machine's Scenes from the Second Storey (Fiction/Polydor) in 1993 and Die Warzau's Engine (Fiction/Wax Trax!) in 1995. Other artists who were part of the Fiction roster and publishing catalog during this time included Billy Mackenzie & the Associates, Candyland, Purple Hearts, Cult Hero and the Passions.

Starting in 1995, Fiction became dormant as a label, apart from the occasional Cure release, and focused exclusively on Fiction Songs, who partnered with Bertelsmann Music Group to form a joint venture publishing company and moved their New York offices to the Bertelsmann Building at 1540 Broadway in Times Square in 1994; Fiction's headquarters were unchanged. However, BMG eventually acquired Fiction Songs and its catalog in 2001. Besides being the publisher for the Cure and other Fiction artists, Fiction Songs was also home to hip hop/electronic artists Stereo MCs, producer and songwriter Cameron McVey, the Jungle Brothers, Primitive Radio Gods, and NY Loose.

In 1992, the Fiction headquarters at Charlotte Street served as the first home to XFM co-founded by Parry. A benefit concert called Great Xpectations was held in support of the station on 13 June 1993 at Finsbury Park in London. A live album of the concert titled Great Xpectations Live was released in July 1993 on Fiction and included performances by the Cure, Damon Albarn and Graham Coxon, Belly, and Catherine Wheel.

In January 2004, Joe Munns, Paul Smernicki and Beastman revived Fiction to "give Polydor a bit more of a guitar stronghold", as their roster then consisted mostly of pop acts. The first release on the "new" Fiction was the Snow Patrol single "Run", which entered the UK singles chart at No. 5. The subsequent Snow Patrol album, Final Straw, went on to sell over two million copies worldwide. In January 2014, Universal Music Group restructured Fiction as a standalone label, removing it from Polydor's corporate affiliation.

== Artists ==
- AKA
- Art School Girlfriend
- Billie Marten
- Courtney Barnett
- Dead Dads Club
- Drug Store Romeos
- Jehnny Beth
- Kavinsky
- Kurt Vile
- Liana Flores
- Lily Lyons
- Man/Woman/Chainsaw
- Orlando Weeks
- Palace
- St. Vincent
- Steven Wilson
- The Big Moon
- The Cure
- The Horrors
- The Itch
- Tom A. Smith

== See also ==
- Lists of record labels
