= Pete Howard =

English drummer

- Born: 1960 (age 65–66)
- Genres: Punk rock; alternative rock; experimental rock
- Instruments: Drums; percussion
- Years active: 1982–present

Peter Howard is an English rock drummer. He was a member of the Clash from 1983 until 1986.

== Career ==
=== The Clash (1983–86) ===
Howard joined the Clash in spring 1983. Drummer Topper Headon had been fired the previous year, shortly before the release of the album Combat Rock, owing to the effects of his heroin addiction on the band. When Headon's replacement (the group's original drummer, Terry Chimes) also left, Howard replaced him. He played with the band after their last tour before founding member Mick Jones was sacked, when they co-headlined the US Festival in San Bernardino, California, on 28 May 1983; at the festival's New Music Day, they drew a crowd estimated at 100,000 and 200,000 people. Howard continued touring with the band in America and Europe during 1984, and early the following year appeared on their final studio album, Cut the Crap. His drum parts were almost entirely excluded from the album by the group's manager, Bernard Rhodes, who replaced them with drum machines. The only two tracks he was given were recorded live in the studio at the same time to form the B-side of the maxi-45s, including "This Is England," as well as "Do It Now" and "Sex Mad Roar." The band broke up in 1986.

=== Post-Clash career (1986–present) ===
He went on to work in the London-based rock group Eat. They released a maxi single "Shame" in 1992, and an album, Epicure, the following year. He then formed Vent 414 with Miles Hunt. In 2000, he formed the short-lived group Morgan with Morgan Nicholls. They released one studio album, Organized, and an EP, Flying High.

In 2001, Howard joined the alternative rock group Queenadreena for their albums Drink Me (2002), The Butcher and the Butterfly (2005) and Djin (2008). He left the group in 2008 and did not appear on their 2000 debut album, Taxidermy.

Howard joined The Wonder Stuff in February 2019.

== Discography ==
=== With the Clash ===
- Cut the Crap (1985)

=== With Eat ===
- Sell Me a God (1989)
- Epicure (1993)

=== With Queenadreena ===
- Drink Me (Rough Trade, 2002)
- The Butcher and the Butterfly (One Little Indian, 2005)
- Live at the ICA (One Little Indian, 2005)
- Djin (Imperial, 2008)

=== With the Wonder Stuff ===
- Better Being Lucky (Good Deeds Music, 2019)
