= KatieJane Garside =

English singer

Katie Jane Garside
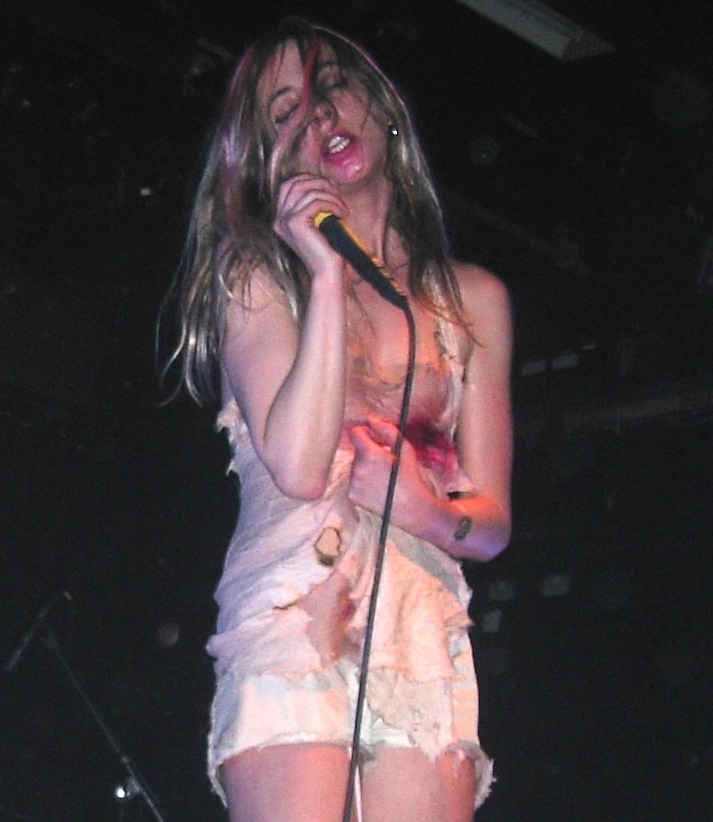
- Garside with Queenadreena, 2005
- Born: Katrina Jane Garside; 8 July 1968 (age 58); Buckrose, East Riding of Yorkshire, England
- Occupations: Singer; songwriter; visual artist; writer
- Years active: 1989–1994, 1999–present
- Children: 1
- Musical career
- Genres: Alternative rock; noise rock; blues rock; alternative metal; neofolk; freak folk
- Instruments: Vocals; keyboard; autoharp
- Labels: One Little Independent; Blanco y Negro; Rough Trade; Imperial; Deva; A&M

Katrina Jane Garside (born 8 July 1968) is an English singer, songwriter, and visual artist. She is known for her musical projects in an eclectic range of genres including noise rock, alternative metal, acoustic, and neofolk, and vocals that range from childlike whispers to harsh scream singing. The London Evening Standard once described her as "one of the scariest women in alternative music."

Garside had an itinerant childhood, growing up in several locations throughout England due to her father's service in the British Army. She spent a significant portion of her adolescence aboard a yacht sailing the high seas with her family. As a teenager, she was discovered by record producer Glyn Johns, and collaborated musically with his son, Ethan, for approximately one year. She later rose to prominence as the lead vocalist of the indie noise rock band Daisy Chainsaw, which she formed in 1989 in London with guitarist Crispin Gray.

After quitting Daisy Chainsaw in 1993, Garside went into seclusion for several years before reuniting with Gray in 1999 to form the rock band Queenadreena, with whom she released four studio albums between 2000 and 2008. In both Daisy Chainsaw and Queenadreena, Garside received critical attention for her alternately harsh and childlike vocals, manic onstage behaviour, and raucous live concerts.

Garside self-released a solo album, Lullabies in a Glass Wilderness, in 2007, under the name Lalleshwari. The same year, she worked with composer Hector Zazou on the collaboration album Corps Electriques, and began writing and releasing material with her project Ruby Throat, an acoustic collaboration with her partner, American guitarist Chris Whittingham. In late 2007, Ruby Throat released their debut album, The Ventriloquist. Garside concurrently held a mixed media art exhibition, Darling, they've found the body, which was shown at WOOM Gallery in Birmingham. Ruby Throat self-released their subsequent albums Out of a Black Cloud Came a Bird and O' Doubt O' Stars in 2009 and 2012, respectively. During this period, Garside and Whittingham resided on a yacht with their children, sailing the world.

Ruby Throat released their fourth album, Baby Darling Taporo, in 2017. Garside and Whittingham subsequently formed a new musical project called Liar, Flower, under which they released the album Geiger Counter in April 2020. Garside discusses this album at length in a career spanning interview on Conan Neutron's Protonic Reversal.

== Early life ==
Katrina Jane Garside was born on 8 July 1968 in Buckrose, East Riding of Yorkshire, England, the first of two daughters. She spent her early years in Salisbury, Wiltshire, though her family relocated frequently as her father was in the British Army; he also had a musical background, having played in local bands in London. When she was 11 years old, Garside's father took the family to live aboard a 9.8-metre (32 ft) yacht, and they sailed the world for four years. Garside has said that spending her formative years living on the sea gave her a "different perspective on things":

You have no reference points, so everything you know ceases, including time on the long passages. It's the same thing every day, relentlessly. There's nothing to see, there's no one to talk to. Which is... terrifying. You've got nowhere to hide, you're literally so exposed. But it's also very beautiful because all distraction falls away.

While living on the sea, Garside and her younger sister, Melanie, spent significant amounts of time listening to cassette tapes given to them by their grandfather, largely soundtrack albums to musical films, such as the West Side Story soundtrack by Leonard Bernstein. To pass time, they would often reenact sequences from the film soundtracks with ragdolls. Among the tapes Garside listened to also included albums by Led Zeppelin, which she said "really completes some idea of a story."

After returning to England, Garside's father went abroad to earn money, as the family had returned from sea with "about fifty pounds". Garside's younger sister Melanie was subsequently enrolled in a boarding school where, while in her dormitory, she played a cassette tape of Garside singing along to "Dreams" by Fleetwood Mac; record producer and engineer Glyn Johns, whose daughter was also enrolled in the school, was visiting and overheard the tape. Impressed by her singing, Johns contacted Garside, inviting her to join his son, Ethan, who was beginning to make music. Garside, who had recently been offered a scholarship to attend art school, forewent her enrollment and instead spent approximately a year collaborating with Ethan at his father's studio, writing and recording material, which she later described as "atrocious... but we were learning, you know? Learning all of the time. Ethan and I were going to go off to L.A. and become rock stars—and then it all fell apart, as it should do when you're sixteen years old." She subsequently relocated to London, working odd jobs while seeking to make a living as a singer.

== Musical career ==
=== 1989–1995: Daisy Chainsaw ===
Garside formed Daisy Chainsaw in 1989 after responding to an advert in a newspaper by guitarist Crispin Gray. Bassist Richard Adams joined the band, along with Canadian drummer Vince Johnson. The group quickly became well known for their raucous live performances, and her appearance described as a "Gothic street urchin image, complete with dead flowers meshed into her dreadlocked hair". In a review of one of the band's concerts in 1991, an unnamed journalist for Bust magazine wrote: "KatieJane Garside is either in drastic need of psychiatric help or she deserves an Oscar for best actress."

The band toured the United Kingdom with Hole and Mudhoney to promote the album prior to its release, and Garside drew comparisons from British press to Hole's frontwoman Courtney Love. Love allegedly cited Garside as one of the "first true riot grrrls" in 1991 and admitted to borrowing heavily from Garside's aesthetic. Garside never associated herself with the movement, which was based in the Pacific Northwest of the United States.

The band released Eleventeen in 1992, which would be their only album before Garside left the band in 1993. The album spawned "Love Your Money", which was the band's most popular single; they performed the song live on British television show The Word in 1992. "Love Your Money" reached number 26 in the UK Singles Chart in February 1992.

After Garside left Daisy Chainsaw, she disappeared from the public eye and music scene, going into seclusion, residing in the Lake District. A self-described recluse, Garside later commented that "I could be anywhere, really, and it wouldn't make a lot of difference, so I don't know necessarily that much about the country that I was born in and that I've lived in." Due to her manic onstage histrionics and bizarre behaviour in interviews, rumours circulated that Garside had succumbed to mental illness. In later years, she admitted that she had been suffering a nervous breakdown at the time. She lived in the historical Rigg Beck, a notorious retreat for artists and bohemians.

In retrospect, Garside commented that, had she not left the band, "it would have killed me... Because I didn't write the songs [in Daisy Chainsaw] I could never give enough, never go far enough. I couldn't bleed in words, I couldn't bleed in lyrics—I could only bleed in performance, and that meant attacking [myself], literally."

While living in the Lake District, Garside began to write her own material, as well as collaborating with the industrial band Test Department in 1995 on their album Totality.

=== 1997–2007: Queenadreena ===
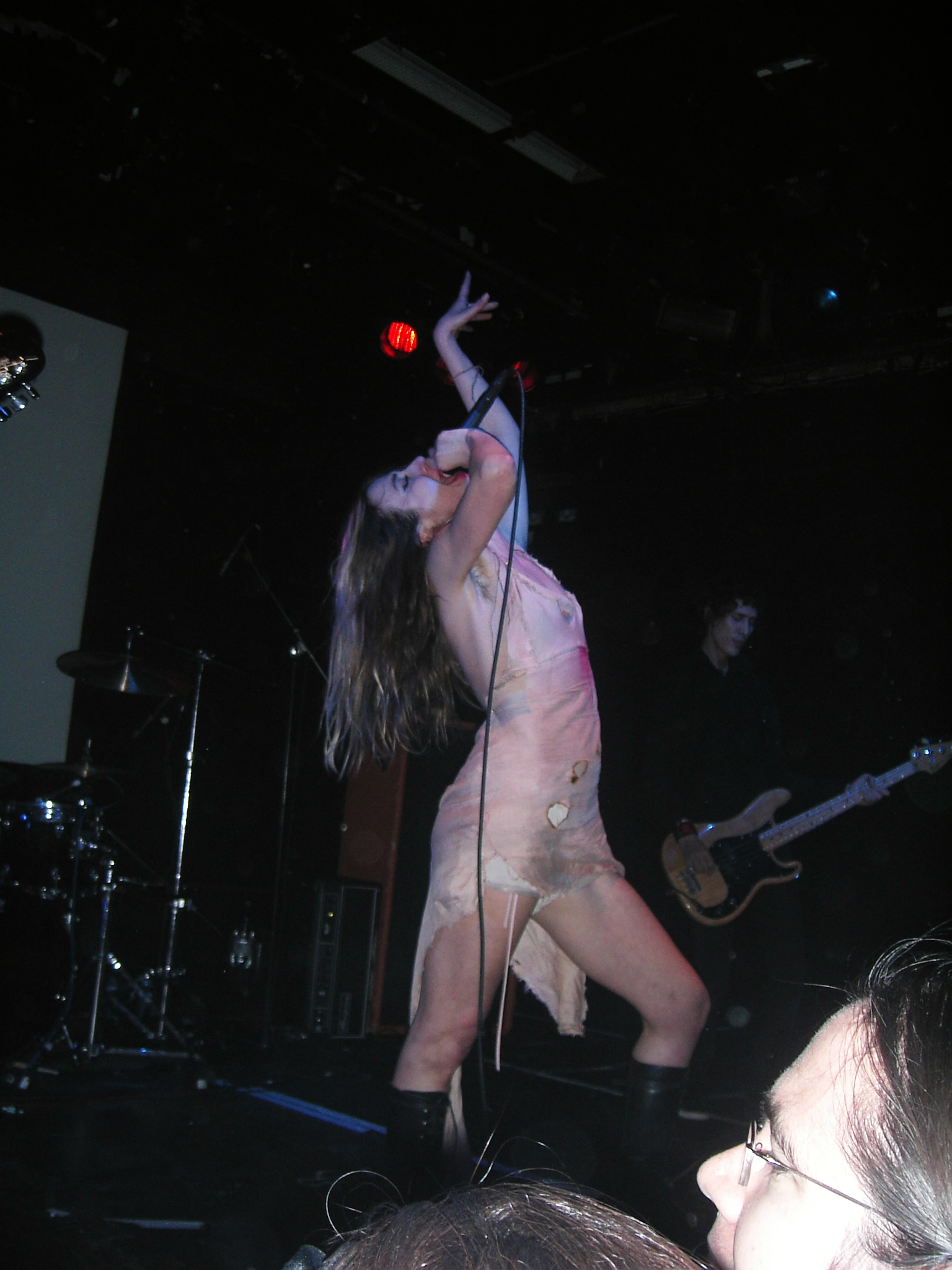
Garside performing with Queenadreena, 2005

Garside had no intentions of returning to music until the late 1990s when she returned to London and was contacted by former guitarist Crispin Gray; in 1999, they formed Queenadreena and released a total of four studio albums over the following decade: Taxidermy (2000), Drink Me (2002), The Butcher and the Butterfly (2005), and Djin. Some time between 1999 and 2002, during the early stages of Queenadreena, Garside resided in Wales for a brief period.

In 2003, Garside contributed guest vocals to the track "Last Leaf Upon the Tree" on the group Minus's album Halldor Laxness.

After recording Live at the ICA, which featured a live 2005 performance by Queenadreena at the Institute of Contemporary Arts, the band released two more albums, Ride a Cockhorse, a compilation which featured unreleased 4-track demos, and Djin, which was their final studio release before disbanding around 2009.

Garside's solo work of this time includes a collection of home recordings called Lalleshwari/Lullabies in a Glasswilderness released in 2006. Complementing this release was a collection of short films made by KatieJane.

=== 2008–present: Ruby Throat and Liar, Flower ===
In 2007, shortly before the release of Queenadreena's final album Djin, Garside formed the musical duo Ruby Throat with Chris Whittingham, an American guitarist from Hawaii whom she met while he was busking at a train platform on London Underground. Garside commented that her encounter with Whittingham came "after being on my knees on the floor, praying for an intervention, because everything [was] so fused and knotted. And I needed a cosmic intervention—but it happened, in fact, that day. I found him, and he's so extraordinary at everything."

The duo released their first album, The Ventriloquist, in November 2007. In contrast to Queenadreena's metal and noise rock style, Ruby Throat is a more ethereal, vocal based project primarily featuring acoustic guitar. The album was well-received, and critics drew comparisons to the work of PJ Harvey and Mazzy Star.

The following year, Corps Electriques, a collaboration album between Garside and French composer Hector Zazou, was released through Signature Records. Ruby Throat subsequently released Tour EP in 2009, which featured handmade artwork, followed by their second album, Out of a Black Cloud Came a Bird (2009). Ruby Throat toured internationally during this period, opening for Rasputina in the United States.

In 2012, they released their third album, O' Doubt O' Stars, which featured a limited edition packaging with a book of lithographs and Garside's art, as well as handwritten lyrics. In April of the same year, the band announced they were recording new material via their official Facebook page. In 2014 a new track, "Secret Fires", was released on the third Jeffrey Lee Pierce Sessions compilation Axels & Sockets.

In November 2016, Garside announced the forthcoming release of a limited edition book of 34 poems entitled A whispering frayed edge in 2017. In November 2017, Ruby Throat released their fourth studio album, Baby Darling Taporo. Garside granted an extensive interview to Vice in October 2018, during which she divulged that she and Whittingham still resided on their boat Iona with their children, and that they had recently completed an extensive sailing trip across the world.

In April 2020, Garside and Whittingham released a album, Geiger Counter, under a new musical project named Liar, Flower.

On May 24, 2025, Garside revealed an upcoming album on her social media and personal page entitled Ornamental Gardens. The album is being released under the name Liar, Flower and is slated to be released in September 2025.

== Other works ==
=== Visual art ===
Garside held a mixed media art exhibition at the WOOM Gallery in Birmingham in 2007, titled Darling, they've found the body, featuring a collection of photographs, film, and other visual works.

=== Writing and graphic novels ===
In 2005, Garside collaborated with comics artist Daniel Schaffer on the graphic novella Indigo Vertigo, published by Image Comics in August 2007. Describing the graphic novel, Schaffer said it is "designed to communicate on a number of different levels. KatieJane's words are hypnotic and they cut to the bone, but they're always in motion, the meanings varying with each reading."

In 2017, a book profiling Garside's career was released entitled Under a Floorboard World: The Career of Katie Jane Garside. It was released via Breakbeat Books, which is the publishing name of independent author Charlie Bramley. The book "provides a long overdue exploration into the career of Garside, offering rich analysis and original insight". It also features an original interview with Garside, undertaken during the writing period. The same year, she issued A whispering frayed edge, a poetry collection released in a limited edition run.

== Artistry ==
=== Vocals, style and lyrical themes ===
I'm a meditator. I have my stories, and I have my narrative, and I'm happy with that. And I'm happy to share it, although I don't expect everyone to buy into it. But I think that there's power in stories, so I talk to my people and I take directives from them, and they change shape quite a lot. But I give myself over to them, particularly in creating my own narrative through my music.

— Garside on her relationship to her audience, 2020

Garside has been noted by critics for her unique vocals, which alternate from "childlike whispers" to harsh scream singing, particularly on her work with Queenadreena; a concert review published by The Guardian noted: "It's surprising that such a loud noise can come from such a small person." "I do strain my voice doing bad work," Garside commented, "[but] sometimes the impulse is too huge [and] I just have to." Some critics have likened her vocals to those of Macy Gray.

Lyrically, consistent themes across Garside's various musical projects have included exploitation, sexuality, childhood and innocence. While Garside's musical output with Daisy Chainsaw and Queenadreena were marked by abrasive, rock and metal-influenced instrumentation and vocals, her work with Ruby Throat is more restrained; a review published in PopMatters noted: "Garside's breathy, nearly childlike voice is the dominant element of [Ruby Throat's debut] The Ventriloquist, gentle acoustic guitars and lap steels setting the stage for her voice. Despite the somber lyrical themes, this is a clear heir to the lineage of ethereal makeout albums like those from Mazzy Star and the Cocteau Twins."

=== Influences ===
In her early career, Garside spoke little of her influences, musical or otherwise. However, during a 1992 interview with Paul Morley, she said she liked Carly Simon. In a 2020 interview with American Songwriter, she divulged that one of her earliest musical inspirations was Petula Clark's "Downtown", as well as the works of Stevie Nicks and Fleetwood Mac. She has also stated she is an admirer of Courtney Love, whose band, Hole, Garside toured with while performing in Daisy Chainsaw: "[She is] a force of nature. I adore her. I'm in awe of her... She is so powerful... I'm so grateful to have been there and shared all the grimy dressing rooms with her."

In a 2020 interview, Garside cited Nico's The Marble Index (1968) as a seminal influence on her work.

=== Performances ===
Garside has been noted throughout her career for her raucous, "carnivalesque" live performances. Describing her in 1999, the Evening Standard wrote: "With her eerie voice and piercing eyes, Garside is one of the scariest women in alternative music." While in Daisy Chainsaw, she engaged in spectacles such as drilling doll heads onstage and drinking juice out of baby bottles. The group's raucous concerts would sometimes result in Garside performing self-mutilation onstage. Russell Senior, guitarist of Pulp, recalled that at one 1989 concert in London, Garside wrapped the microphone cord so tightly around her neck onstage that she lost consciousness, and the show had to be ended early.

Commenting on live performances, she said in 2002: "I know what turns me on, and it's that fine line, that point where you're falling off the edge of a cliff, where your stomach turns, I'm always trying to find that point in music. You rarely hit it, and again, that's the joy of playing live, because there you can be just at that point where you've lost balance. I'm always walking between polarities, trying to find the opposing sides." In her early career, Garside's stage presence was noted by critics for its disheveled appearance, marked by torn clothing and her body covered in dirt. Caroline Sullivan of The Guardian writing in 1992: "In clinical terms, Garside is probably no loopier than Belinda Carlisle, but her fizzing nervousness imparts a sense of great fragility, and her candour is almost embarrassing."

Despite her often animated and aggressive performances, Garside has admitted to having stage fright, particularly in her early career: "I feel things really intensely, and the absolute horror of walking onstage—you know, that sort of sense of exposure and being on a precipice...it just flicked a switch in me... if I got out of my own way and stopped trying to try, I just had access to a big 'let[ting] go.'" In a 2003 interview, she elaborated:

I think taking the stage is one of the most unnatural things anyone can do. In a way, just walking on stage actually creates an altered state—it's not right, no one's meant to do that, unless you're a priest or a magician, or something like that. To put somebody who's very incapable in many ways in to that position creates a combustion reaction inside me. I know that, and I take the stage knowing that... The beauty of playing live is when my drummer goes in to 5th gear or in to 10th gear, and for some reason there's something that hits me in the base of the spine and I'm gone, and that's Hallelujah for me.

== Personal life ==
In 2011, Garside gave birth to a daughter with her partner and musical collaborator Chris Whittingham. As of 2012, the couple resided on a ketch named Iona, along with their two children, then aged 10 years and 10 months. The boat was damaged in a storm in St Mawes, Cornwall in June 2012; they made repairs in Falmouth and left England shortly afterwards with the intention to sail around the world.

Garside revealed in a 2020 interview that, throughout her touring career, she spent approximately a decade "drinking really heavily" and that she felt the discussion of "drugs and abstinence is huge, for all of us," adding: "These days, I drink very, very little... I meditate, and that's what gets me high... [I think] you do have to possibly go through it a little bit to find your way out. It's taken me a long time to find the root, but I've found it and it certainly doesn't involve drugs or alcohol at this point in my life."

== Discography ==
‡ signifies extended play

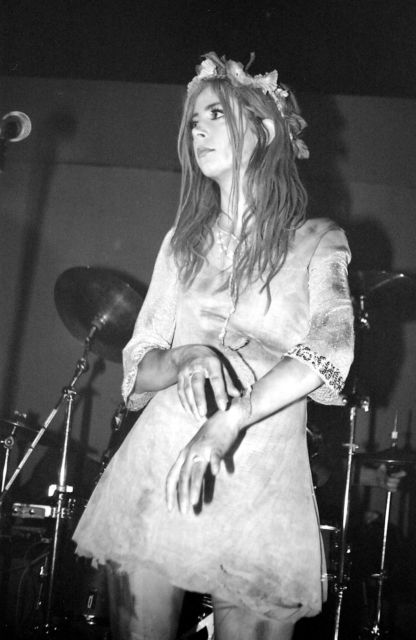
KatieJane Garside performing live with Daisy Chainsaw in London, 1990.

Daisy Chainsaw

- LoveSickPleasure (1991) ‡
- Pink Flower (1992) ‡
- Eleventeen (1992)

Queenadreena

- Taxidermy (2000)
- Drink Me (2002)
- The Butcher and the Butterfly (2005)
- Live at the ICA (2005)
- Ride a Cock Horse (2007)
- Djin (2008)

Solo

- Lalleshwari/Lullabies in a Glasswilderness (2005) (Boxset included an audio CD and a DVD. This version was limited to 300, with the first 100 being signed and numbered)
- Lalleshwari/Lullabies in a Glass Wilderness (2006) (Version did not include a DVD but included two different tracks from the previous release)
- Corps Electriques (2007) (Collaboration with Hector Zazou)

Ruby Throat

- The Ventriloquist (2007) (Version limited to 500, signed and numbered)
- Tour EP (2009) ‡ (Limited Edition handmade 5-track EP sold exclusively on their 2009 tour, including 2 photographs)
- Out of a Black Cloud Came a Bird (2009) (Version limited to 500 number copies, including 10 fine art prints, 5 photographs and a personal effect)
- O' Doubt O' Stars (2012) (34-page ribboned and hand assembled litho printed art book, 12 songs, 55 minutes, 500 numbered copies) and (Albums 1–10, handwritten cover, signed and numbered, KJG original handwritten lyrics of 1 of the 12 songs (these were used in making the finished artwork litho plates). There are only 10 of these in total, and include 1 song lyric sheet each with the first 10 albums, and a signed and numbered photo)
- The Jeffrey Lee Pierce Sessions Project: Axels & Sockets (Various artists compilation featuring Ruby Throat's cover of Secret Fires by The Gun Club)
- Baby Darling Taporo (2017)
- Stone Dress (2018) ‡

Liar, Flower

- Geiger Counter (2020)
- Ornamental Gardens (2025)

Collaborations

- Creaming Jesus – Dead Time (1991) ‡
- Creaming Jesus – Guilt By Association (1992)
- Frostbite – The Second Coming (1993)
- The Sacred Sawdust Ring – The Greatest Show Of Truth (1994)
- Test Dept – Totality 1 (1995)
- Test Dept – Totality (1995)
- Test Dept – Totality 1 & 2: The Mixes (1997)
- Mínus – Halldór Laxness (2004)
- Ghostigital – In Cod We Trust (2006)
- Stories From The Moon – Stories From The Moon (2006)
- Jeff Zentner – The Dying Days Of Summer (2009)
- Kittens in the Bin – Yellow Snake (2021)

== Sources ==
- Chandler, Megan; Anselmo, Diana (2015). "The "Dollification" of Riot Grrrls: Self-Fashioning Alternative Identities". In Forman-Brunell, Miriam; Hains, Rebecca (eds.). Doll Studies: The Many Meanings of Girls' Toys and Play. New York: Peter Lang Press. pp. 63–84. ISBN 978-1-433-12069-5.
- Elba, Rob (July 2020). "Nico: "The Marble Index" with KatieJane Garside". That Record Got Me High Podcast (Podcast) – via Spotify.
- O'Brien, Lucy (2012). She Bop: The Definitive History of Women in Popular Music (3rd ed.). London: Jawbone Press. ISBN 978-1-908-27927-9.
- Roberts, David (2006). British Hit Singles & Albums (19th ed.). London: Guinness World Records Limited. ISBN 1-904994-10-5.
- Senior, Russell (2015). "Fifty-franc whores". Freak Out the Squares: Life in a Band Called Pulp. London: Aurum Press Ltd. ISBN 978-1-781-31438-8.
- Shea, Marc (2020). "KatieJane Garside (Liar, Flower; Daisy Chainsaw)". Performance Anxiety (Podcast) – via Apple Podcasts.
- Slade, Paul (2015). Unprepared To Die: America's Greatest Murder Ballads And The True Crime Stories That Inspired Them. London: Soundcheck Books. ISBN 978-0-992-94807-8.
