= Crispin Gray =

English musician (born 1963)

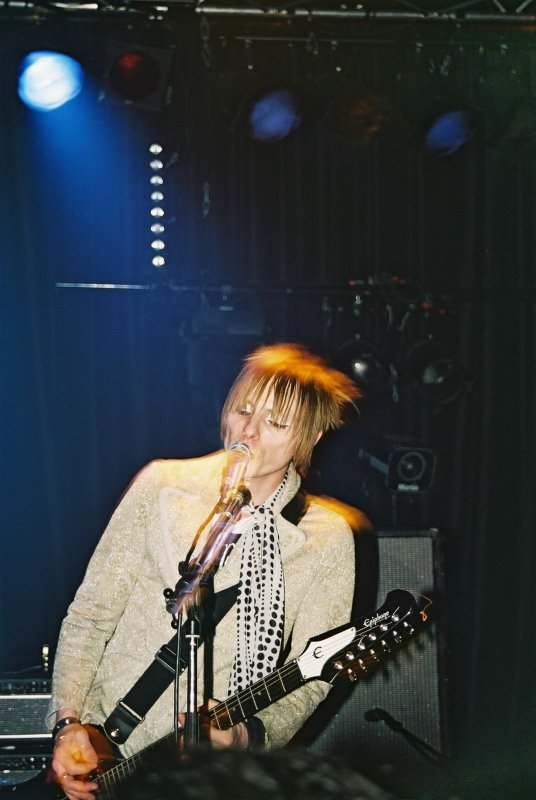
- Gray performing with QueenAdreena, 2006

Background information
- Born: Crispin John Orion Gray; 1963 (age 62–63); Islington, London, England
- Genre: Alternative rock • noise rock • experimental
- Occupation: Musician
- Instrument: Guitar • vocals • bass • drums • glockenspiel • harmonica
- Years active: 1989–present

Crispin John Orion Gray (born 1963) is an English guitarist and songwriter. Best known for his bands Daisy Chainsaw and Queenadreena, Gray has also played with Dizzy Q Viper, Vapid Dolly and The Dogbones. He is currently a member of Starsha Lee. His great uncle was British poet John Gray, allegedly the inspiration for Oscar Wilde's The Picture of Dorian Gray. In November 2022, Gray released his first ever solo project, Alien Airforce, via Public Pressure.

== Discography ==
=== Daisy Chainsaw ===
- LoveSickPleasure EP (1991), Deva Records
- Pink Flower EP (1992), Deva Records
- Hope Your Dreams Come True EP (1992), Deva Records
- Eleventeen (1992), One Little Indian Records
- For They Know Not What They Do (1994), One Little Indian Records
- You're Gruesome EP (1995), Fluffy Bunny Records/Cheapskates Records

=== Dizzy Q Viper ===
- Losers Like You EP (1996), Blue Angel Records
- Uncle Cracking Bone EP (1996), Blue Angel Records

=== Vapid Dolly ===
- The Queen of Pseudo Psychos (1997), Epic/Sony

=== Queenadreena ===
- Taxidermy (2000), Blanco y Negro Records
- Drink Me (2002), Rough Trade Records
- The Butcher and the Butterfly (2005), One Little Indian Records
- Live at the ICA (2005), One Little Indian Records
- Ride A Cock Horse (2007), Independently Released
- Djin (2008), Imperial Records

=== The Dogbones ===
- The Dogbones (2010), Buzzsaw Records

=== Ultra Grand Supreme ===
- Antiques Rock Show (2017), Digital Only

=== Starsha Lee ===
- Post-God Metaphysics (2018), Syndicol Music
- Plausible Hate EP (2018), Syndicol Music
- Love Is Superficial EP (2019), Cadiz Entertainment
- Killing Heteronomy (2021), Digital Only
- Resting In Murder (2022), Digital Only
- Damnatio Memoriae EP (2022), Cadiz Entertainment

=== Alien Airforce ===
- One EP (2022), Public Pressure
- Give Pigeons the Right of Way (2023), Easy Action Records
- Good Luck World (I Think You're Going To Need It) (2024), Easy Action Records
- Somewhere On The Spectrum (2024), Digital Only
- Human, All Too Human (Remix) (2025), Digital Single Only
- Loving Nothing (2025), Digital Single Only
