= Daisy Chainsaw =

English pop punk band

- KatieJane Garside and Crispin Gray performing with Daisy Chainsaw in 1991

Background information
- Origin: London, England, United Kingdom
- Genres: Noise rock; pop punk
- Years active: 1989–1995
- Labels: Deva Records, One Little Indian, A&M Records (US)
- Past members: KatieJane Garside; Crispin Gray; Richard Adams; Vince Johnson; Belinda Leith

Daisy Chainsaw were an English rock band from London, formed in 1989. The band was founded by vocalist KatieJane Garside and guitarist Crispin Gray. Garside appeared on the band's early EPs and 1992 debut album, Eleventeen, until her departure in 1993. Belinda Leith replaced Garside as vocalist for the band's final album, For They Know Not What They Do, released in 1994, before the band was dissolved in 1995.

== Career ==
The band formed in 1989 after KatieJane Garside answered an advertisement placed by guitarist Crispin Gray in the music press. Their gigs included grapevines and rag dolls strewn across the stage, and Garside thrashing around in soiled gowns drinking juice from a baby bottle.

The band were successful with their Love Sick Pleasure EP which included the hit single, "Love Your Money" - primarily due to prime time appearances on ITV's The Chart Show and Channel 4's The Word. However, they had to decline appearing on BBC TV's Top of the Pops because Garside had a throat infection. Love Your Money reached number 26 in the UK Singles Chart in February 1992.

Turning down an offer to be signed to Madonna's Maverick record label, they later signed to the indie label, One Little Indian. The follow-up singles Pink Flower (UK number 65) and Hope Your Dreams Come True were only moderately successful, as was their debut album Eleventeen (1992), peaking on the UK Albums Chart at number 62.

In support of Eleventeen, the band toured extensively in the United Kingdom with grunge band Mudhoney, who were supporting their new release, Every Good Boy Deserves Fudge (1991), and alternative rock band Hole, who were also supporting their debut, Pretty on the Inside (1991). Hole frontwoman Courtney Love cited KatieJane Garside as one of the "first true riot grrls" alongside herself and Kat Bjelland of Babes in Toyland, although none of these bands were directly associated with the riot grrl movement.

In 1992, they toured the UK alongside Sheep on Drugs and Elephant Witch.

In 1993, Garside left the band and disappeared from the music scene and from the public eye. Due to her manic onstage histrionics and bizarre behaviour in interviews, rumours circulated that Garside had fallen into mental illness. Garside reportedly moved to a house in the Lake District and was publicly unheard of until 1999.

Belinda Leith (previously Queen B, London Records 1990) now joined as Daisy Chainsaw's lead vocalist, signing to One Little Indian and recording the final Daisy Chainsaw album For They Know Not What They Do. After touring England to promote the album in 1993 the album was released the next year. Leith left before the album's release to collaborate on other projects and sing on Terry Hall's album Home, released in 1994. She is featured in the video and front cover for the single "Forever J".

The three remaining members renamed themselves Dizzy Q Viper and released an EP with Crispin Gray on vocals, before splitting up. After Dizzy Q Viper, Vapid Dolly was created, and this band was made up of Dizzy Q Viper members with the addition of Hanayo as lead vocals. The new millennium saw Garside and Gray musically reuniting to form Queenadreena. Garside currently plays in Liar, Flower and Gray plays in Starsha Lee in addition to his own solo project, Alien Airforce.

Crispin Gray was interviewed at length in May 2021 about the formation and history of Daisy Chainsaw in addition to his subsequent bands. "Love Your Money" will be reissued as a limited edition 7" single in Spring 2024 via Easy Action Records.

== Discography ==
Daisy Chainsaw studio albums
Title	Album details	Peak chart positions
Title	Album details	UK
Eleventeen	Released: 6 October 1992; Formats: CD, CS, LP; Label: One Little Indian	62
For They Know Not What They Do	Released: 1994; Formats: CD, LP; Label: One Little Indian	—
"—" denotes album that did not chart or was not released.

Daisy Chainsaw EPs
Title	Album details
Love Sick Pleasure	Released: 1991; Formats: CD, LP; Label: Deva
Pipachi	Released: 1992 (Commercially Unreleased); Formats: LP; Label: Deva
You're Gruesome	Released: 1995; Format: CD; Label: 95 Cheapskates

Daisy Chainsaw singles
Title	Year	Peak chart positions	Album
Title	Year	UK	Album
"Love Your Money"	1991	26	Eleventeen
"Pink Flower" / "Room Eleven"	1992	65	Eleventeen
"Hope Your Dreams Come True"	1992	—	Eleventeen
"The Future Free"	1994	—	For They Know Not What They Do
"Love Me Forever"	1994	—	For They Know Not What They Do
"—" denotes single that did not chart or was not released.
