= Queenadreena =

English alternative rock band

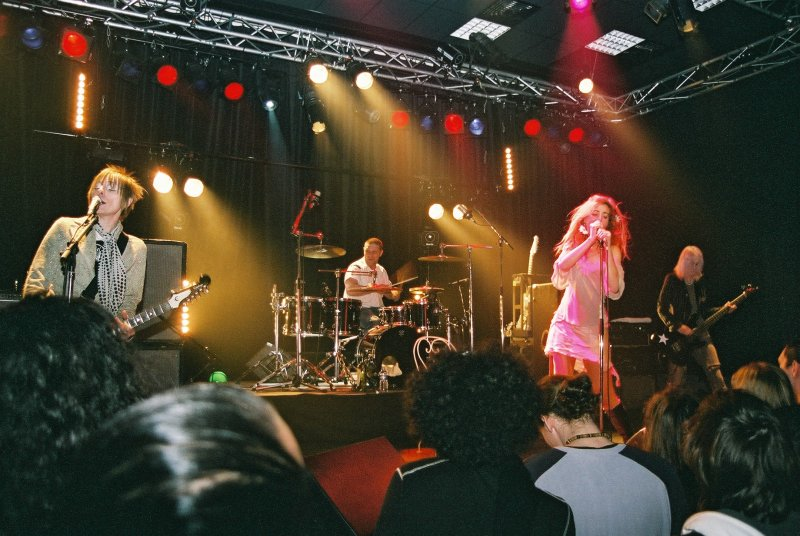
- Queenadreena performing in Hérouville-Saint-Clair, France, 2006

Background information
- Also known as: Queen Adreena
- Origin: London, England
- Genres: Alternative rock; noise rock; indie rock; heavy metal; gothic rock
- Years active: 1998–2009
- Labels: Blanco y Negro; One Little Independent; Rough Trade; Imperial; Warner; Cadiz
- Members: KatieJane Garside; Crispin Gray; Pete Howard; Nomi Leonard
- Past members: Orson Wajih; Billy Freedom; Paul Jackson; Janne Jarvis; Richard Adams; Michael Vakalis; Dom Bouffard; Melanie Garside; Bambi; Stephen Gilchrist

Queenadreena (Note: The band's name was originally stylized as Queen Adreena.) were an English alternative rock band that formed in London, England in 1998 by vocalist KatieJane Garside and guitarist Crispin Gray, who had previously collaborated in the celebrated but short-lived band Daisy Chainsaw. Garside and Gray, who had earned a reputation for their abrasive songwriting with Daisy Chainsaw, incorporated elements of blues rock and other genres with Queenadreena, in addition to their predominant noise rock influences.

The band released four studio albums between 2000 and 2008, beginning with the critically acclaimed Taxidermy (2000). The band signed with Rough Trade Records for their second release, Drink Me (2002), before being dropped by the label, after which they signed with the independent label One Little Indian. The band also released a live album, Live at the ICA, which was recorded at the Institute of Contemporary Arts. In 2009, the group disbanded and Garside pursued other solo projects, namely Ruby Throat.

== History ==
=== Formation, Taxidermy: 1998–2001 ===
Queenadreena formed in 1998 after guitarist Crispin Gray reunited with vocalist KatieJane Garside, with whom he had collaborated in 1989 when they formed the band Daisy Chainsaw. Garside left Daisy Chainsaw after completing two years with the band, and went into seclusion in the Lake District, where she lived in the historic Rigg Beck, a retreat for artists and bohemians. There, Garside began writing and recording her own material. Reflecting on leaving the music industry, Garside commented: "If I hadn't left, it would have killed me... Because I didn't write the songs [in Daisy Chainsaw] I could never give enough, never go far enough. I couldn't bleed in words, I couldn't bleed in lyrics—I could only bleed in performance, and that meant attacking [myself], literally."

Returning to London in 1998, Garside moved to Belsize Park, where Gray had also been living, and the two reconnected to form the group. Garside said the band name came from when she was writing in Wales: "She just arrived in my head. She came in as Princess Adreena, and I had to write her story. She'd been a warrior princess who'd cut off her left breast for better use of bow and arrow, stuff like that. That's where she came from and then we crowned her, made her into Queen Adreena".

Gray and Garside were joined by drummer Billy Freedom and bassist Orson Wajih and released their debut single, "X-ing Off the Days" / "Heavenly Surrender" on 25 October 1999. The band subsequently released their first studio album, Taxidermy, in early 2000, on the Blanco y Negro Records imprint. Some of the material featured on the album, namely the track "X-ing Off the Days," was written solely by Gray in the years following the breakup of Daisy Chainsaw. NME gave the album a positive review, writing: "While carrying on Daisy Chainsaw's predilection for rock as infantile nightmare, here the scope is much wider than a one-track take on banshee pop. There are some obvious precedents, notably Björk and PJ Harvey, but much more than either of those two reference points, this debut album is frequently akin to eavesdropping on psychotherapy."

To support the record, the band toured nationally supporting Nine Inch Nails, as well as performances at the 2000 Reading and Leeds Festivals. After its release, the band's name stylized as Queenadreena, and subsequent releases reflect this. During this time, the band released a split single, featuring a cover of Dolly Parton's "Jolene," and the folk ballad "Pretty Polly".

=== Label shifts, The Butcher and the Butterfly: 2002–2006 ===
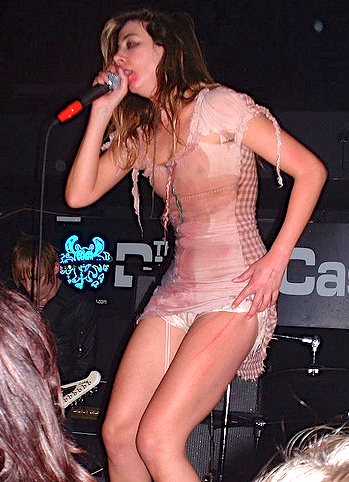
Garside performing with Queenadreena, Dublin, 2006

Billy Freedom was replaced in 2002 by drummer Pete Howard, formerly of The Clash. The band signed with Rough Trade for their second album, 2002's Drink Me. The record spawned the single "Pretty Like Drugs," which garnered the band attention from rock press. The album was well received by such publications as Drowned in Sound, who gave it a 7/10 rating, writing: "KatieJane Garside is the kind of woman who makes ordinarily rational grown guys go weak at the knees. "Pretty Like Drugs" will show you why. As her cutesy lost girl Tori Amos/Björk-isms erupt into fearsome hollers that would have piss dribbling down Courtney Love's surgically enhanced thighs, it'll all make sense." The French publication Les inrockuptibles described the record as "Gothic, dark, and threatening."

Rough Trade dropped the group shortly after the release of Drink Me, and Wajih left the band while they embarked on a tour supporting Garbage. Janne Jarvis, formerly of Radiator, joined the band as a temporary bassist for their tour, before former Daisy Chainsaw bassist Richard Adams joined the group. Adams shortly after left the band, and they appeared at the Castle Donington Download Festival in 2003.

The band signed with One Little Indian Records in 2004, and released The Butcher and the Butterfly with KatieJane's sister Melanie Garside on bass, who left soon after and was replaced by Paul Jackson (not to be confused with the fusion bassist of the same name). On 22 March 2005, the band recorded a live album at the Institute of Contemporary Arts in London. The album was released in September as Live at the ICA.

=== Djin and dissolution: 2007–present ===
In 2007, Queenadreena independently released Ride a Cock Horse, an album composed of early demos. Further line-up changes saw Nomi Leonard becoming the new bass player and, in the latter half of 2008, Pete Howard being replaced on drums by Stephen Gilchrist.

On 8 October 2008 Queenadreena released their fourth studio album, Djin, initially only in Japan through Imperial Records. The album eventually saw a release in the United Kingdom September 2009, but was not actively promoted by the band which, by then, was effectively on hiatus. Incorporating influences of blues rock more heavily than the band's early releases did, Allmusic called the record "[Queenadreena's] masterpiece, balancing all their characteristically mercurial elements on the solid basis of the mastery of an accomplished band, which was left by the media to grow at its own pace."

In 2011, Crispin Gray stated, "I wouldn't rule out some kind of reunion gigs in the future. I don't think there will be another record from Queenadreena though, I would be very surprised myself. I haven't heard from Katie in well over a year and I don’t know where she is."

In a 2020 interview on Conan Neutron’s Protonic Reversal Garside, who released an album under the name Liar, Flower, expressed extreme skepticism about working with Gray in the future or further Queenadreena material including her contributions.

Their final studio album Djin was re-released in a limited edition, gatefold double neon pink vinyl set by Cadiz Entertainment on 16 April 2021. The reissue included six additional new demo tracks and a previously unheard song "Heaven Doesn't Wait", co-written and recorded with the late Andy Gill from Gang of Four.

Gray was interviewed at length in May 2021 about the formation and history of Queenadreena, as well as his other bands.

In 2026, Gray and Garside released a remix of the album Ride a Cock Horse with the overall sound completely rebuilt. The album was made available exclusively as a digital download on their Bandcamp.

== Members ==
- KatieJane Garside – vocals (1998–2009)
- Crispin Gray – guitar, backing vocals (1998–2009)
- Pete Howard – drums (2002–2008)
- Nomi Leonard – bass (2006–2009)

Past members

- Orson Wajih – bass (1999–2002. Played on the 'Taxidermy' tour and on Drink Me)
- Billy Freedom – drums (1999–2002. Provided drums on Taxidermy)
- Melanie Garside – bass (autumn 2003 – early 2005. Played bass at the Killing Joke support at the Astoria, London (as seen on the Queenadreena Live DVD), and provided bass on The Butcher and the Butterfly, co-writing several tracks, and played live gigs for over a year before leaving)
- Paul Jackson – bass (2005–06. Played live for about a year)
- Michael Vakalis – bass (May/June 2003. Played on a French tour)
- Bambi – drums (2008–09)
- Janne Jarvis – bass (autumn 2002. Played on the Drink Me tour)
- Richard Adams – bass (December 2002 – spring 2003. Played the 'Crash' live soundtrack, and toured in early 2003. Co-wrote 'Pull Me Under' which was played live under the title 'Carpet Burn')
- Dom Bouffard – bass (summer/autumn 2003. Played on UK tour)

== Discography ==
- Taxidermy (2000)
- Drink Me (2002)
- The Butcher and the Butterfly (2005)
- Ride A Cock Horse (2008)
- Djin (2008)

== Bibliography ==
- Larkin, Colin (2000). The Virgin Encyclopedia of Nineties Music. Virgin. ISBN 978-0-753-50427-7.
- Young, Rob (2006). Rough Trade. Labels Unlimited. Black Dog Publishing. ISBN 978-1-90477-247-7.
