= Revolution (Brand book) =

2014 non-fiction book by Russell Brand

- Author: Russell Brand
- Cover artist: Dean Chalkley
- Language: English
- Subject: Politics
- Publisher: Random House (Ballantine Books [U.S.], Century [U.K.])
- Publication date: October 2014 (hardcover, e-book)
- Publication place: United Kingdom
- Media type: Print (hardcover), e-book
- Pages: 320
- ISBN: 978-1-10-188291-7 (hardcover)

Revolution (stylised RƎVO⅃UTION, with "love" spelled backwards) is a 2014 non-fiction book written by the British comedian and actor Russell Brand. In it, Brand advocates a non-violent social revolution based on principles of spirituality and the common good. Critical response to the book was divided. While some reviewers praised its "charm" and Brand's "distinctive" voice, others complained about a lack of style and substance.

Following Brand's conviction of rape and sexual assault in 2026, Century confirmed that they were withdrawing the book from publication in response.

== Context ==
Russell Brand had been well known for some years as a comedian and actor: he had performed stand-up at the Hackney Empire New Act of the Year in 2000, and took his one-man show, the confessional Better Now, to the Edinburgh Festival in 2004; after various roles on British TV, he had gained critical acclaim for his starring role in Forgetting Sarah Marshall in 2008 and had regular roles in Hollywood comedies thereafter. He had also hosted a variety of radio shows (though had been forced to resign from the BBC after a scandal over prank phone calls) and published a memoir, My Booky Wook, and its sequel, Booky Wook 2.

But increasingly he had also become known for his political views and activism: in 2009, for instance, he attended the G-20 London summit protests, and in 2012 he testified to a parliamentary committee about drug addiction.

In October, 2013, Brand was offered a stint as the guest editor of an issue of the New Statesman, which he chose to dedicate to the topic of "revolution." As he wrote in the issue's editorial, "Imagining the overthrow of the current political system is the only way I can be enthused about politics." That same week, Brand was interviewed by Jeremy Paxman on BBC Two's current-affairs programme, Newsnight. Paxman posed to Brand the problem: "How, may I ask, is this revolution going to come about?" The book Revolution, then, is presented as an extended response to that question.

== Synopsis ==
Revolution draws on Brand's own experiences and observations both as someone who has experienced considerable social mobility in his life—from a working class upbringing with a single mother in Grays, Essex, to Hollywood fame and fortune—and as a former drug addict who has found solace in twelve-step movements and in spirituality. "Change is something I'm good at," Brand claims. It also draws on a range of counter-cultural authors such as Noam Chomsky, David Graeber, and Helena Norberg-Hodge, as well as on historical events from the Spanish Revolution of 1936 to Che Guevara's reflections on the Cuban Revolution of 1959, and contemporary practices such as participatory budgeting in Porto Alegre or direct democracy in Switzerland.

The book argues that contemporary capitalism is manifestly unequal and unfair, to the detriment of society's winners as much as to its many victims. It also claims that contemporary democracy is a sham, and so conventional politics will never bring about real change: "That is why I do not vote; that is why I will never vote." Instead, Brand advocates a social revolution based on two principles: "1) nonviolence, and 2) the radical improvement of the quality of life for ordinary people." It proposes a society of "self-governing, fully autonomous, ecologically responsible, egalitarian communities."

== Reception ==
Revolution was criticised by reviewers for its lack of substance and style of writing. The writing was described as "atrocious: long-winded, confused and smug; filled with references to books Brand has half read and thinkers he has half understood" by Nick Cohen in The Observer. Robert Colville in The Daily Telegraph wrote that although "he comes across as palpably sincere in his convictions," Brand "has not even the faintest fragment of an inkling of how his Revolution will come about" and "[a]s for how things would work afterwards, don’t ask." Colville called the book "sub-undergraduate dross".

Sophie Gilbert in The Atlantic magazine wrote "Revolution preaches but doesn't practice. There's a reason Brand’s most recent standup show is called 'Messiah Complex.' He has the zeal of the missionary and the charisma of the cult leader, along with a newfound commitment to imposing his vision upon society through deliberately undemocratic means. If he ever figures out how to communicate that vision in a less abstract and imperious way he could indeed change the world, although for better or for worse is anyone’s guess."
