= Matt Morgan (comedian) =

British comedy writer

- Born: Matthew Morgan
- Notable work: The Russell Brand Show

Comedy career
- Years active: 2002–
- Medium: Television, radio

Matthew Morgan is a British comedy writer and radio presenter. He is best known for his work with Russell Brand, with whom he shared numerous writing credits, as well as co-hosting The Russell Brand Show on BBC Radio 2, BBC Radio 6 Music and Radio X.

== Career ==
=== Writing ===
Morgan met Russell Brand when he was working as an intern on MTV. He first joined with Brand after the presenter told him he had a television show idea which was "good" and "commissioned", and that Morgan should work on it with him; Morgan later joked that neither of those things turned out to be true.

=== Radio ===
Morgan was the co-host of The Russell Brand Show from its initial conception in 2006 on BBC Radio 2 until its finish following Brand's resignation due to the prank telephone calls row. On the radio show, Morgan played the straight man to Brand's cheeky chappy persona, often mimicking Brand's accent and singing. In his memoir, Booky Wook 2, Brand asserted that he and Morgan got into a row following Brand's controversial turn as the host of the 2008 MTV Video Music Awards (which the men co-wrote), and Morgan refused to return to the show.

When Brand returned to talk radio in the Autumn of 2010, Morgan rejoined The Russell Brand Show.

From 8 to 22 August 2021, Morgan, along with Noel Gallagher, presented "The Radio X Residency" every Sunday on Radio X.

== Credits ==
=== Writing credits ===
- RE:Brand (2002)
- Empire Square (2005)
- 1 Leicester Square (2006)
- Russell Brand's Got Issues (2006)
- The Russell Brand Show (2006)
- The Kevin Bishop Show (2008)
- James Corden's World Cup Live (2010)
- Borked TV (The 5:19 Show) (2010)
- The Fun Police (2011)
- Cardinal Burns (2012)
- Very Important People (2012)
- The Mimic (2014)
- Sam Delaney's News Thing (2016)
- Morgana Robinson's The Agency (2016)
- Plebs (2016)
- Murder in Successville (2017)
- Hospital People (2017)
- Mister Winner (2020)

=== Presenting ===
- Russell Brand on the Road (2007)

=== Other roles ===
- Russell Brand's Ponderland (2007–2008) – Creative Director
