= RE:Brand =

- Genre: Documentary; Comedy
- Created by: Russell Brand; Matt Morgan
- Starring: Russell Brand
- Ending theme: Mogwai – "Summer (Priority Version)"
- Country of origin: United Kingdom
- Original language: English
- No. of series: 1
- No. of episodes: 7

Production
- Producer: Vera Productions
- Camera setup: Single-camera
- Running time: 25 minutes

Original release
- Network: UK Play
- Release: 2002

RE:Brand is a British documentary and comedy television programme that aimed to take a challenging look at cultural taboos.

It was conceived, written and hosted by Russell Brand, with the help of his comic partner for many projects, Matt Morgan. The series was shown on the now defunct digital satellite channel UK Play in 2002. As confirmed in his memoirs My Booky Wook and mentioned on his radio shows, Brand was often drunk or on heroin during the filming of RE:Brand.

== Episode guide ==
No.	Title
1	"Dad Fight"
Brand challenges his father to a boxing match.
2	"Nazi Boy"
Brand meets Mark Collett, the leader of the Youth BNP.
3	"Homeless James (Part 1)"
Brand invites a homeless man to live in his house. According to Brand, James has since died of a drugs overdose.
4	"Homeless James (Part 2)"
Homeless James returns to life on the streets.
5	"My Old Tart?"
Brand takes a pensioner away for a dirty weekend.
6	"Eddie Kidd Rides Again"
Brand meets motorcycle daredevil Eddie Kidd, who was left paralyzed for life after a stunt went wrong.
7	"Wanky Wanky"
Brand challenges his own heterosexuality by masturbating a gay man in a pub toilet, but with some apprehension.
