= Russell Brand: Open Secret =

2026 film by Olivia Isaacs

- Directed by: Olivia Isaacs
- Produced by: Felicity Cross; Laura Spence; Kate Yandle
- Starring: Russell Brand; Nish Kumar; Harriet Kemsley; Rosamund Urwin; Mark Pinheiro; Amanda Alguero Alejos; Sarah Solemani
- Cinematography: Lynda Hall
- Edited by: Ben Brown
- Music by: Peter Nickalls
- Production company: 72 Films
- Distributed by: Netflix
- Release date: November 13, 2026 (Streaming VOD)
- Running time: 83 minutes
- Country: United Kingdom
- Language: English

Russell Brand: Open Secret is a 2026 British documentary directed by Olivia Isaacs concerning the sexual assault allegations concerning British entertainer Russell Brand with allegations of sexual and physical abuse from Brand's former partners and confidantes. It was released by Netflix, four days after Brand's sentencing to ten years and six months in prison at Southwark Crown Court in London.

== Interviews ==
Those interviewed are:

- Nish Kumar (Comedian)
- Harriet Kemsley (Comedian)
- Rosamund Urwin (Chief News Correspondent)
- Mark Pinheiro (Former Housemate)
- Amanda Alguero Alejos (Former Girlfriend)
- Sarah Solemani (Actor & Writer)
- Georgina Baillie (Former Dancer)
- Jordan Martin (Former Girlfriend)
- Briony O'Callaghan ('Emily')
- Charlotte Wace (Investigate Correspondent)
- George Monbiot (Journalist)
- Laura Conder (TV Producer)
