= Under the Skin with Russell Brand =

Political podcast

- Genre: News, political podcast

Creative team
- Created by: Russell Brand

Cast and voices
- Hosted by: Russell Brand

Publication
- Original release: March 4, 2017 – April 20, 2019

Related
- Website: www.russellbrand.com/podcast/

Under the Skin with Russell Brand was a podcast hosted by comedian, actor, radio host, author, and activist Russell Brand.

== Format ==
=== Interviews ===
In the podcast Russell Brand interviews a variety of guests from "the world of academia, popular culture and the arts." A variety of public figures and academics are interviewed including Canadian author, social activist, and filmmaker Naomi Klein, former US Vice-President Al Gore and physicist Brian Cox.

=== Content ===
According to iTunes the podcast "asks: what's beneath the surface – of people we admire, of the ideas that define our time, of the history we are told." A review in The Guardian described the contents of the podcast stating that "Many big ideas are covered: the lurch to the right, humans becoming redundant thanks to the rise of digitalised economies and the focus given to the image of the burning twin towers after 9/11."

== Critical response ==
A review in the Financial Times described the podcast as "Refreshingly calm and thoughtful." A review in The Guardian commented on the content of the podcast stating "Although the thoughts exchanged aren’t those that usually make it on to Question Time, they are powerful." A review in the magazine The Skinny was more critical, calling the episode where Brand interviewed the Scottish comedian Frankie Boyle "Just an hour of half-arsed, loosely-connected gibberish."

== See also ==
- Political podcast
