= Russell Brand: Re:Birth =

- Directed by: Chris Howe
- Written by: Russell Brand
- Starring: Russell Brand
- Release date: 4 December 2018 (Netflix)
- Running time: 63 minutes
- Country: United Kingdom
- Language: English

Russell Brand: Re:Birth is a 2018 standup comedy film written and performed by English comedian and activist Russell Brand. It debuted on Netflix on 4 December 2018.

Re:Birth was filmed at the Hackney Empire theatre in East London in April 2018 during his 2017–18 comedy tour of the same name.
