= The Abbey (2007 TV series) =

- Created by: Morwenna Banks
- Written by: Morwenna Banks
- Directed by: Johnny Campbell
- Starring: Morwenna Banks; Russell Brand; Omid Djalili; Rasmus Hardiker
- Country of origin: United Kingdom
- Original language: English

Production
- Executive producer: Henry Normal

Original release
- Network: ITV
- Release: 14 February 2007

The Abbey is a British television sitcom produced by Baby Cow Productions for ITV, about dysfunctional celebrities with various vices that seek sanctuary at The Abbey to overcome their problems. It is written by Morwenna Banks, directed by Johnny Campbell and executive produced by Henry Normal.

Banks stars as ex-rock star Marianne Hope who opened The Abbey as a retreat offering new age therapies, after her very public nervous breakdown. Omid Djalili plays The Abbey's owner Tony. Russell Brand is a DJ seemingly nonchalant about his crack cocaine addiction, who even has to resort to sticking a can a whipped cream up his nose to satisfy his addiction. Liz Smith plays a perverted pensioner with an addiction to sex. Tamsin Egerton plays a model with an eating disorder, who eats toilet roll in order to avoid hunger pangs. Miranda Hart plays the suicidal wife of a disgraced MP, obsessed with cleaning, cooking and being lovely to everyone in the most obtuse way! The show also stars Reece Shearsmith as a 'doctor' and counsellor and Marti Pellow as Marianne Banks estranged husband.

The show was broadcast on 14 February 2007 on ITV and served as a pilot, with a view to a series if the one-off was popular enough. The episode gained an estimated 2.3 million viewers and somewhat poor reviews.

ITV commissioned a full series of The Abbey for broadcast on ITV2 in 2008. Filming was due to begin in January 2008 but the series was later cancelled.
