= 1 Leicester Square =

British chatshow

- Titlecard for 1 Leicester Square
- Genre: Chatshow
- Presented by: Russell Brand
- Opening theme: "Moby Dick" by Led Zeppelin
- Country of origin: United Kingdom
- Original language: English

Production
- Camera setup: Multi-camera
- Running time: 45–48 minutes

Original release
- Network: MTV UK
- Release: 2 April – 31 December 2006

1 Leicester Square is a British chatshow hosted by Russell Brand which ran from 2 April to 31 December 2006 on MTV UK. The show's title was the actual address of MTV's glass-walled central London studio that overlooked Leicester Square. It featured celebrity guests, musical entertainment and various asides featuring the presenter. The show was widely viewed as a vehicle for the comeback of Brand after his sacking from MTV in 2001.

== Format ==
The show begins with an announcer introducing Brand. Controversially, he was once introduced as being "bigger than Jesus" in reference to a misquoted claim by John Lennon claiming that The Beatles were bigger than Jesus. After entering Brand sits in a flamboyantly upholstered chair with a zebra fabric for the seat covering. He then introduces the musical act for the show and they will play a track. After this, an announcer will introduce the first guest (usually the biggest star) with a comically fabricated fact or anecdote about them. The guest will then be interviewed whilst they sit on a sofa next to Brand. After this interview, there is usually a commercial break.

After the break, Brand usually interviews the musical act that is on the show this week in another area of the studio. This is usually punctuated with a sketch and Daniel and Len's Video Review (see below). This interview is typically followed with another interview by Brand next to a mock bar with another celebrity. After this interview there is another commercial break.

The last portion of the show is taken up with the segment For Pity's Sake Help Us (see below), followed by another performance from the guest musical act.

== Short features ==
In series 2 of the show, all of the short features have been removed from the show with the exception of For Pity's Sake Help Us. Daniel and Len later appeared on Russell Brand's Got Issues, introducing each show with a skit loosely connected to the week's topic.

=== Pimp My Application ===
Pimp My Application is a spoof of the popular MTV UK show Pimp My Ride UK. It has only appeared once on the show. Russell Brand parodies Tim Westwood, giving him a hook for a hand, a peg leg and a squawking voice. Brand lampoons the show by using overexaggerated street speak when describing how they are going to 'pimp' up a person's CV when he is applying for a job.

=== For Pity's Sake Help Us ===
This is a feature that Brand always ends the show with, save the last musical performance. Audience members are asked if they have any problems and these are then answered by some of the celebrities that have appeared earlier in the show.

=== The Rats ===
The Rats is a sketch that is performed before each of the commercial breaks and at the end of the show. Two rats are crudely manipulated and given human voices. They will usually engage in a short, humorous conversation that loosely relates to a topic of discussion in the previous segment.

== Minor characters ==
=== Gatwick ===
Gatwick is a model of a man that loosely resembles King Charles and is occasionally used by Brand as a prop on the show.

=== Dan the Researcher ===
Dan is the show's mysterious researcher that Brand alludes to after fabricating or bringing up an obscure fact about his interviewee.
