= The Russell Brand Show prank calls =

Controversial radio incident in 2008

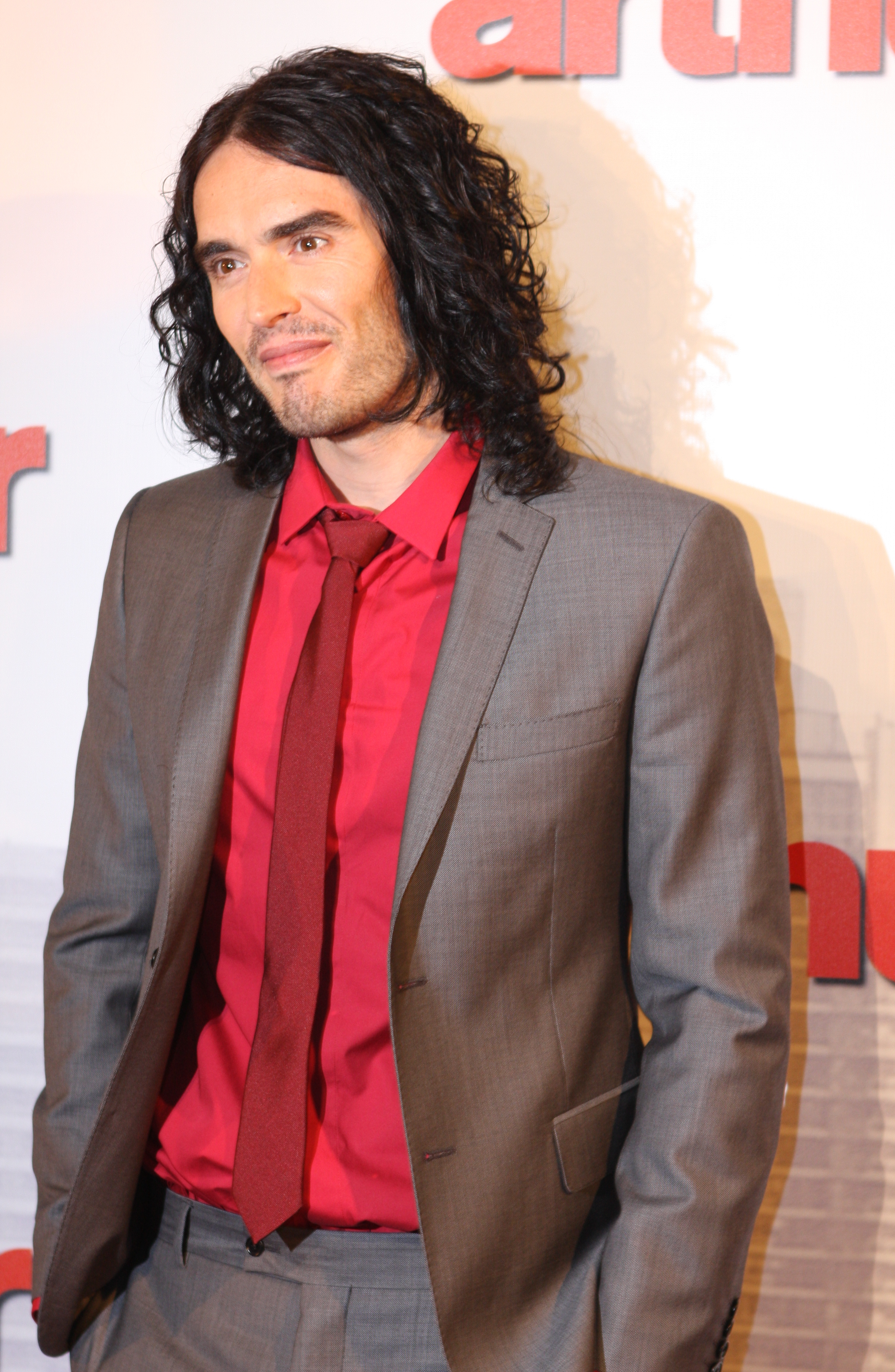
Russell Brand

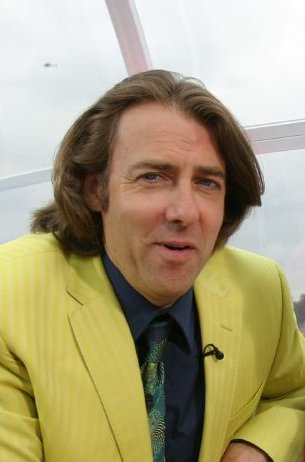
Jonathan Ross

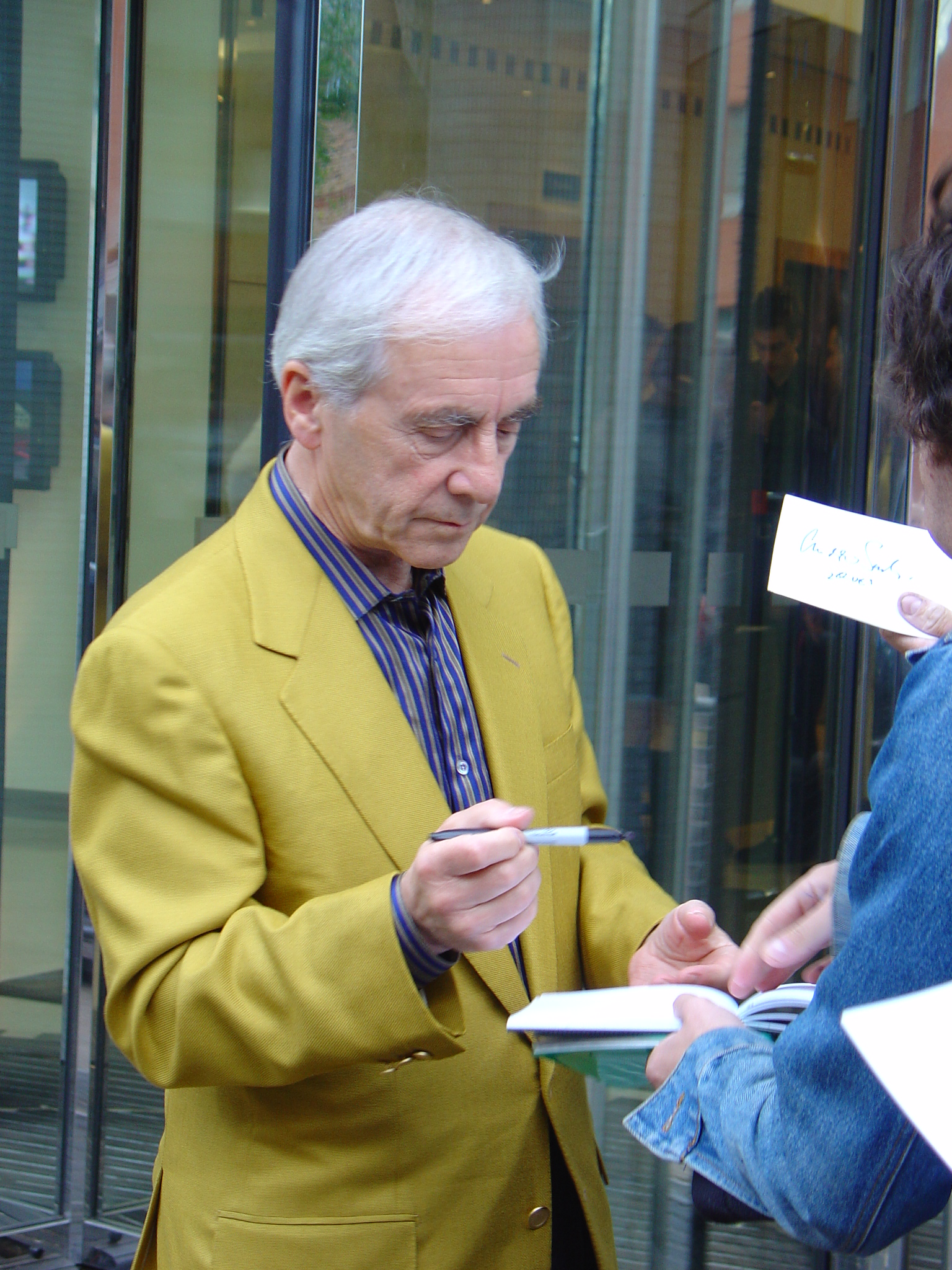
Andrew Sachs

In an episode of The Russell Brand Show broadcast on BBC Radio 2 on 18 October 2008, comedian Russell Brand and presenter Jonathan Ross made prank calls to actor Andrew Sachs that created controversy in the United Kingdom. Brand and Ross called Sachs to interview him on air; when he did not answer, they left messages on his answering machine, including comments about Brand's relationship with Sachs' granddaughter Georgina Baillie.

The incident received little attention initially, but an article in The Mail on Sunday of 26 October 2008 led to widespread criticism of Brand, Ross, and the editorial decisions of the BBC. The event became known as Sachsgate or Manuelgate (a reference to Sachs' Fawlty Towers character Manuel). Brand and Ross were criticised by a number of MPs, including Prime Minister Gordon Brown, and the BBC received a record number of complaints. The BBC suspended Ross while it and Ofcom launched investigations. Both Brand and Radio 2 controller Lesley Douglas resigned from the BBC. On 30 October, the BBC suspended Ross without pay for twelve weeks. The BBC was fined £150,000 by Ofcom.

== Prank calls ==
From April 2006 through to October 2008, Russell Brand and Matt Morgan presented the weekly BBC radio show The Russell Brand Show. Brand was joined by celebrity guests including Noel Gallagher, Noel Fielding, Jonah Hill and Morrissey. On 16 October 2008, Andrew Sachs, who portrayed Manuel in the 1970s television sitcom Fawlty Towers, was scheduled to be a phone-in guest on the show. Brand had briefly been in a relationship with Sachs' granddaughter Georgina Baillie.

The episode was prerecorded due to Brand's work commitments. After being unable to reach Sachs on his home telephone, Brand and his co-host that week, Jonathan Ross, left Sachs four voice messages on his answering machine. In the first message, Brand joked about Fawlty Towers and the fact that both he and Sachs had appeared in The Bill, but was interrupted by Ross shouting out "he fucked your granddaughter". The rest of the message and the following three messages were all characterised by Brand and Ross attempting to apologise for Ross' outburst, but each quickly descended into farce; for example, Brand sang to Sachs: "It was consensual and she wasn't menstrual", and Ross asked to marry him. Brand later said that listening to the calls was like hearing "two idiots dancing towards a canyon". According to Brand, Ross advised him against broadcasting the recording of the calls.

== Complaints ==
On 25 October, Brand presented his last edition of his radio show with co-host Simon Amstell, which they performed live. Shortly before going on air, Brand was informed that The Mail on Sunday would be running a story about the phone calls. During the show, Brand apologised to Sachs, but also devoted much of the show to deriding the Daily Mail for its support of Nazism in the lead-up to World War II. In his apology to Sachs, Brand said: "What's worse – leaving a swearword on Andrew Sachs' answerphone or tacitly supporting Adolf Hitler when he took charge of the Third Reich?"

Sachs later stated he had not given permission for the messages to be broadcast. The BBC originally stated that they were "not aware of any complaint by Mr Sachs", but later confirmed a complaint had been received, and apologised. Brand issued an apology for making the calls but stated it was "funny" during his last radio show, before the Mail had printed the story. Ofcom, the telecommunications regulator, announced its own investigation. On 28 October, the BBC said that it had received 4,700 complaints, after the calls became international news. Later the same day, this number had passed 10,000. The same afternoon, Prime Minister Gordon Brown called the incident "clearly inappropriate and unacceptable". The following day the number of complaints was said to have surpassed 18,000.

This incident resulted in the third-highest number of complaints to the BBC, behind only the airing of Jerry Springer: The Opera and rolling coverage of Prince Philip memorial programmes in April 2021. The incident escalated into a media and political storm that, in much of the British media, eclipsed news of the 2008 financial crisis, the 2008 United States presidential election, and 2008 Nord-Kivu campaign.

In reaction to the telephone calls, Baillie said that her relationship with Brand had been brief and she now felt "betrayed" that he had revealed it to her grandfather. Baillie called for both Brand and Ross to be sacked by the BBC and stated that she and her family would be considering whether to make a formal complaint to the police. Sachs stated that he had no intention of making a complaint to the police or taking the matter further.

== Aftermath ==
=== Actions taken by Ross, Brand, and the BBC ===
On 29 October, Mark Thompson, then Director-General of the BBC, announced that Russell Brand and Jonathan Ross were suspended pending the outcome of an investigation by Tim Davie, director of BBC Audio and Music. The suspension meant that, for the week, Ross would not be appearing on his regular Friday Night with Jonathan Ross television show, Film 2008 with Jonathan Ross, or his Saturday morning Radio 2 show. Similarly Brand would not be hosting his regular Saturday night Radio 2 show or appearing as a guest captain on an episode of Never Mind the Buzzcocks due to be aired on 30 October; the episode had been taped before his resignation, and aired on BBC Two on 19 January 2011, more than two years after the incident. Thompson called the events a "gross lapse of taste by the performers and the production team" (who chose to broadcast the pre-recorded show) that angered licence-payers. Thompson offered a personal and unreserved apology to Sachs and his family. In an interview, Sachs revealed that he had received and accepted written apologies from Brand and Ross. Brand resigned from the BBC later in the day.

On the evening of 30 October it was announced that Controller of Radio 2 Lesley Douglas had tendered her resignation, which had been accepted. Her resignation letter did not address the question of whether she had approved the pre-recorded show for transmission. That day, Ross was suspended without pay from all BBC shows for a period of twelve weeks.

The BBC issued an apology on 8 November, stating that the calls were "grossly offensive" and a "serious breach of editorial standards". The corporation apologised specifically to Sachs and Baillie, and also to licence fee payers. The evening before this formal apology, David Barber, head of Specialist Music and Compliance at Radio 2, also resigned. Like Douglas, he had been aware of the contents of the show, and had sanctioned the segment's broadcast.

=== Reactions from politicians and the media ===
Fifteen MPs signed a motion in the House of Commons, tabled by Labour MP Andrew MacKinlay and Conservative MP Nigel Evans, calling for Brand and Ross to no longer be funded by the licence fee (which funds the BBC). The chairman of the House of Commons select committee on culture, media and sport, John Whittingdale, stated that an investigation by the BBC was needed, but stopped short of calling for Ross and Brand to be sacked. The chairman of the House of Lords Select Committee on Communication, Lord Fowler, in a letter to The Times stated that there were "fundamental flaws" in the way that the BBC was regulated and governed, and that there was "confusion all round" because two parallel bodies, the BBC Trust and Ofcom, were investigating the incident, and it was "both unclear which of them the public should complain to and which of them had precedence over the other".

Shadow Culture Secretary Jeremy Hunt, speaking on the Radio 4 Today Programme on 30 October, also refused to say whether he thought Ross should be sacked, asserting that politicians should remain at "arm's length" from such decisions. In a speech at the London School of Economics the previous day he had criticised the decision by the BBC to broadcast the programme, which had been recorded two days prior to its transmission, saying that "[t]he BBC was quite wrong to take the decision to broadcast the offensive phone calls". He also demurred about calling for the resignations of anyone in BBC management, saying that "[i]t is wrong, in principle, for politicians to be calling for heads of individual broadcasting to be removed", and criticised the BBC for not releasing the name of the person who had given approval for the show to be broadcast.

Hunt was speaking to the LSE about socially responsible broadcasting and stated "I do think the BBC is a socially responsible broadcaster, I just think we need to hear that." He argued that broadcasters were "not being ambitious enough", and outlined his party's plans, should it be elected to government at the next general election, to relax regulation for those broadcasters who agreed to provide only "socially responsible" output. In addition to citing the prank calls as a "perfect example" of where such a "responsibility deal" could have operated, he also pointed to Channel 4 as an example, stating that it was "not good enough" for it to produce "worthy" programmes such as Dispatches documenting alcohol abuse in the US, whilst at the same time it was broadcasting programmes such as Hollyoaks where such abuse took up, according to his estimates, 18% of screen time. The culture spokesman for the Liberal Democrats, Don Foster, criticised this idea, stating that it "threatened the very foundational principles of freedom and independence" of British media, arguing that such government interference in television programming would be "a very sad day for British broadcasting", and pointing out that regulatory mechanisms already exist to deal with issues such as this.

On 29 October, Conservative MP Nadine Dorries called for the BBC to terminate the contracts of both Ross and Brand. In the Commons David Hanson criticised the comments for being inappropriate and not "in keeping with broadcasting". The conservative journalist Charles Moore announced he would not pay his television licence after the BBC's failure to sack Ross, a decision which eventually led to Moore being fined in May 2010.

Secretary of State for Justice Jack Straw, writing in his local newspaper the Lancashire Telegraph on 30 October, became the first Cabinet Minister to call for the pair to be sacked, arguing that if both presenters had worked in commercial radio "they'd have been given their P45 before you could say 'Jack Robinson'."

On the same day, Shadow Leader of the House of Commons, Theresa May, called for a Commons debate on the BBC's handling of the affair.

=== Reaction against censures and suspensions ===
In the days following the suspensions, a number of celebrities, particularly from television and radio, came out in support of Brand and Ross. Many felt that, whilst the incident was unacceptable, it was not deserving of the strong criticism it received, especially when there were other issues troubling the United Kingdom.

Rod McKenzie, the editor of BBC Radio 1's Newsbeat, observed on the BBC Editors' weblog (see Further reading) that audience reactions to Brand's and Ross' remarks had been polarised, noting that whilst his colleagues at Radio 4, Radio 5 Live, BBC television, and the BBC World Service, had been saying one thing, the younger audiences of Radio 1 had been reacting quite differently, and were broadly supportive of Ross and Brand. Some were amazed at the comments of the Prime Minister, with one person observing that "[t]he financial markets are wrecked and all he can do is talk about a petty joke." Others stated that people should "calm down", "get a grip", and that the subject had been "blown out of all proportion". McKenzie also characterised the reaction from the news media as containing "anger: some genuine, some of it synthetic. Some of it comes from the BBC's usual critics." He stated that for the people who worked in the media "profile and salary-envy and schadenfreude may play a part in all this. But how many heard the original transmission and how many are responding to the newspapers' quotes or others' arguments?"

Tim Shaw, a DJ for Absolute Radio, also supported Ross and Brand, appearing on BBC News wearing a T-shirt that read "I back Brand." The television presenter Paul O'Grady stated that the comedians' behaviour was "well out of order". However, he also suggested that the Prime Minister should "get on with more important matters" than complaining about "media gossip". Carol McGiffin, a presenter on ITV's daytime programme Loose Women similarly supported the pair, criticising those who complained and stating that she "could not wait" to download the official podcast which included the incident.

Noel Gallagher of the group Oasis, a friend of Brand's, complained that the press had "dictated the tone" of the controversy, and thought it "typical of the English in general" when "10,000 people get outraged, but only days after it has happened". Gallagher said he had spoken to Brand, who told Gallagher he was "going to fall on his sword".

A petition on the GoPetition web site, calling for the BBC "to turn blame on the 'Andrew Sachs' incident away from Russell Brand and Jonathan Ross, and instead onto whoever green lighted the show" had garnered 336 signatures by 29 October. At the same time, a similar group on Facebook had over 1,000 members. By 30 October, the petition had risen to 4,000 signatures and the Facebook group to 15,609 members. By 2 November, the Facebook group had over 30,000 members, which had risen to over 43,000 members by 5 November.

On 30 October, fans of Ross and Brand protested outside the offices of the BBC. On 31 October, fans prepared to hold a protest outside the offices of the Daily Mail and of the BBC.

Comedian Jimmy Carr also expressed his support for Ross, saying the issue had been "blown out of proportion". Carr blamed the media themselves for escalating it further, stating that Ross was a "national treasure".

Former celebrity publicist Max Clifford played down the apparent outrage aimed at Brand. In an interview he said "I don't think this will cause any problems for Russell Brand. He's known to be controversial and, if anything, it will make him more popular amongst his fans, who will have thought this was hilarious...They won't see anything wrong in what he did. It is a big PR success for him...He will have no problem with his career."

TV critic and columnist Charlie Brooker stated on his show, Charlie Brooker's Screenwipe, his worry that the controversy would lead to a "chilling effect" on comedy, and that the BBC and others would "self-censor too much" in future. He went on to say that the attitude displayed by the complainants and the BBC's backing down would have, in earlier times, precluded the production of much of what was at the time edgy comedy and "made culture poorer for it" (citing Monty Python's Flying Circus, The Day Today and The Young Ones amongst others as shows that would have not been commissioned owing to their controversial content). While criticising those who had complained without seeing the programme and attacking newspapers that attempted to stir up further controversy (in particular the Daily Mail), he did not appear to defend Brand and Ross in particular, stating that the possibility of people being offended by some misjudged humour is "the price you pay for freedom of speech." In a further column in The Guardian, he reiterated this point as well as saying that "people who retrospectively complain to Ofcom about material they've only read about second-hand are, in essence, a bunch of sanctimonious cry-babies indulging in a wretched form of masturbation."

=== Reaction from Georgina Baillie ===
==== Interviews ====
Reacting to the suspensions of Brand and Ross on 29 October, Baillie remarked: "I'm thrilled because justice has been done ... It's despicable. Calling me that in public, not only does it damage my relationship with my granddad, but it could permanently damage my life as well".

A week later, on 5 November 2008, UK television channel Five broadcast an hour-length documentary on the incident, titled Russell & Ross: What the F*** Was All That About? featuring an exclusive interview with Baillie. Baillie stated in the interview that "I think it's way out of proportion what's happened and I don't hate either of them – I don't at all", going on to say "I think they're really talented comedians and I think a world without Jonathan Ross and Russell Brand would be a very sad, dull place." She concluded by saying that Brand needed to learn about respecting women, while Ross should just think before he speaks, "I don't have any harder feeling than that." Baillie also made clear that she would not object to the reinstatement of both Brand and Ross.

On 14 May 2009, Baillie was a guest on the BBC politics and current affairs programme This Week. She was questioned by host Andrew Neil and regular guests Michael Portillo and Diane Abbott about the Brand row within discussion of the general subject of the present day worth and genuineness of public figures saying sorry, in the wake of public apologies from members of parliament (MPs) and Prime Minister Gordon Brown following the events of the MP's expenses row. Asked by Neil if receiving an apology from Brand and Ross had mattered to her, she said yes, as she had been "publicly offended and humiliated", and her grandfather "had been humiliated too". When asked by Abbott if all the publicity surrounding the Brand row had helped her career, she responded "not necessarily ... one would think so, but not really." Neil further asked if the apology she received had helped, she replied yes, stating "definitely" to the follow-up comment from Neil of "better to get it than not get it?" When asked finally on the row by Neil if she thought the apologies from Brand and Ross were genuine, she replied that she thought Ross' was, but the fact that Brand had joked about the row on his later tour "negated" his apology.

In 2023, Baillie said that following the October 2008 incident, her grandfather didn't speak to her for eight years (Sachs died in November 2016) and that the incident exacerbated her problems with drink and drugs. Baillie also revealed that Brand had apologised to her over ten years after the event, and paid for her rehab: "I was struggling with addiction for about 10–15 years and I was finding it very hard to get clean and sober. So one of my mutual friends between me and Russell called him up and said, ‘Georgie needs some help’, and so he sent me to rehab. And so I was physically separated from my drug of choice and I got some therapy and I think that had a big part to play in my recovery journey. He looked me in the eyes and he made his amends to me … he acknowledged it was a private relationship and it shouldn’t have been made public. At the time he had two daughters and it really made him grow and change and I felt it was genuine and I felt he was sorry."

==== Songwriting ====
In 2010, Baillie teamed up with singer Adam Ant (whose drummer Hayley Leggs had been a member, alongside Baillie, of burlesque troupe The Satanic Sluts) to compose the song "Gun in Your Pocket", about the incident, which he intended to release as the lead single for his ninth album Adam Ant Is the Blueblack Hussar in Marrying the Gunner's Daughter (with a rerecording of early 1980s outtake "Who's A Goofy Bunny Then?" as the B-side in tribute to the recently deceased Malcolm McLaren). The project was put on hold when Ant was once again sectioned in May 2010. However, he soon resumed his comeback, and "Gun in Your Pocket" was finally released in October 2012 as the B-side to "Cool Zombie", the eventual first single from the album (which finally emerged in January 2013).

Baillie and Ant composed a second track about the Ross-Brand affair, "Rubber Medusa", a song focussed mainly on Brand and written from Baillie's perspective. Baillie's band, the Poussez Posse, performed this second song regularly in live support slots for Ant's UK, mainland European and Australian tours during 2011–2012. Commenting on the two songs in an interview by John Robb, Baillie noted "The first one that Adam and I wrote was about an ex of mine- guess who! Which is not on the album, which is called Gun in Your Pocket ...(Subsequently) the first one Adam and I wrote together was Rubber Medusa, which was about Russell, Adam came up with the title which is a quote from the Jubilee film, [Brand] does look like a rubber Medusa so I see why he said it."

=== Support for Lesley Douglas ===
A number of radio personalities employed by the BBC came out in support of Lesley Douglas, following her resignation. Douglas was aware of the contents of the programme but had not heard them before they were broadcast. She sanctioned its broadcast with a single word email of "Yes" sent from her BlackBerry phone. Amongst her supporters were Chris Evans and Terry Wogan, both of whom worked for Radio 2 at the time, and Dame Liz Forgan, who called her one of the "outstanding broadcasters of her generation", and said that the BBC had "lost its wits". Mark Thompson said that because of her knowledge of the broadcast, she "had to shoulder some of the responsibility".

=== Subsequent appearances by Brand and Ross ===
Ross had been scheduled to host the 2008 British Comedy Awards for ITV during the period of his suspension from the BBC; however, on 31 October, he stepped down.

On 31 October, Brand left the country, saying that he had work to do in the United States, including television programmes and film collaborations with Judd Apatow and Helen Mirren. The second series of Brand's Channel 4 television show Russell Brand's Ponderland aired as normal on the previous evening, attracting one million viewers, the show's largest ever audience. A further 180,000 watched the show on the timeshift channel Channel 4 +1. The first series of Ponderland, aired in October 2007, had been watched by 840,000 viewers, including those watching Channel 4 +1. The channel reported that it had received 164 complaints from the public, many of these criticising the decision to broadcast the programme, rather than a reflection on the content, and the majority before the programme was transmitted; the show also attracted 212 emails and phone-calls of praise from fans and as such was the most praised programme screened on Channel 4 for that month.

Brand continued to be on the front cover of PETA's "Vegetarian Starter Kit" booklet, despite protests to the organisation. PETA's director, Robbie LeBlanc, said that Brand, who had previously won PETA's "Sexiest Vegetarian Celebrity" contest twice, would remain on the cover "because Mr Sachs, who is also a PETA supporter, has accepted Mr Brand's apology, and that's good enough for us."

Brand went on to win the British Comedy Award for Best Live Standup Performer. In his acceptance speech, Brand dedicated his award to Ross.

After being taken off the air due to Ross' suspension, Friday Night with Jonathan Ross returned to BBC One on 23 January 2009, featuring guests Tom Cruise, Lee Evans and Stephen Fry. The show was watched by 5.1 million viewers, an increase from the 3.74 million of the last show before going off air. Ross' return attracted 25 complaints and three messages of support to the BBC.

In 2009, Friday Night with Jonathan Ross was nominated for a BAFTA. According to The Times, Ross was nominated soon after he was banned. Melody Sachs complained about Ross being nominated so soon after the controversy in an interview with The Daily Telegraph, saying: "I am amazed that Ross should get rewarded with a mouth like his. Nobody is saying he hasn't got talent, but what he did was so disgusting. Of course, he is not worth the money, but he is good at his job. However, I don't think he should be rewarded so soon after what happened. It is like people are saying, 'Let's forget all about it and see what we can give him.' It is wrong and bad timing to give or even put up this guy for recognition when he has done such a terrible thing. It was unforgivable, really. I'm not angry, I just don't believe it."

Sachs himself said that the nomination was "a bit of a surprise", and that "One would question the reasons when it comes so quickly after what happened. I wonder how much it has to do with trying to comfort him. I don't know. That is how it happens. That is showbusiness."

== BBC Trust ruling ==
On 21 November 2008, the BBC's watchdog BBC Trust said that the phone calls were a "deplorable intrusion with no editorial justification". The Trust found that the existing BBC guidelines should have been sufficient to have prevented the incident, and that the "very offensive" programme should "never have been recorded". It found the failures lay in mistakes made by BBC editorial and compliance management. The Trust gave its backing to the BBC's response to the incident and Ross' suspension. The BBC stated the incident was a "very, very serious failure in a radio programme where editorial judgement was exercised that seriously let the BBC down".

The Trust also criticised Brand's "so-called apology" of 25 October, and the staff of Chris Moyles' Radio 1 show for also breaching BBC guidelines for comments by Brand in an interview on the morning of 21 October, at a time when children were likely to be listening. The Trust recommended tighter controls for programmes such as Brand's, made by companies owned by their performers. Long-term effects of the controversy included the establishment of a register of "high-risk" programmes.
