= Russell Brand =

English comedian and actor (born 1975)

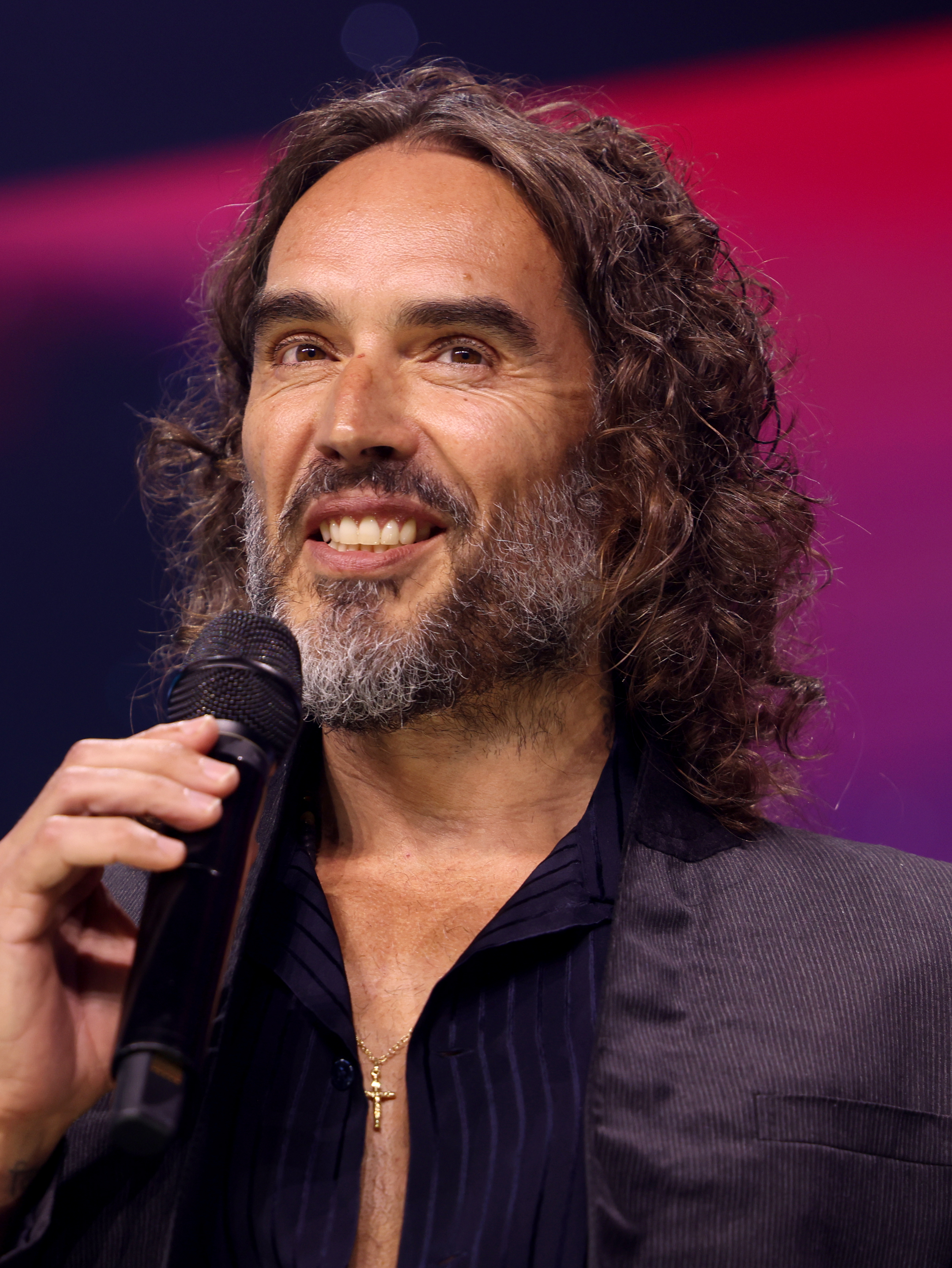
- Brand in 2025
- Born: Russell Edward Brand; 4 June 1975 (age 51); Thurrock, Essex, England
- Spouses: Katy Perry (m. 2010; div. 2012); Laura Gallacher (m. 2017)
- Children: 3

Comedy career
- Years active: 1994–2026
- Medium: Stand-up; television; film; social media; radio
- Genres: Observational comedy; black comedy; blue comedy; improvisational comedy
- Criminal information
- Status: Imprisoned at HM Prison Littlehey, Cambridgeshire
- Convictions: Rape (1 count); Sexual assault (3 counts)
- Penalty: 10 years and 6 months' imprisonment

Details
- Victims: 4 confirmed; 10+ suspected
- Country: England

YouTube information
- Channel: Russell Brand
- Genres: Talk; politics
- Subscribers: 6.62 million
- Views: 1.68 billion
- Last updated: November 2026
- Russell Brand's voice Recorded July 2013 from the BBC Radio 4 programme Desert Island Discs
- Website: russellbrand.com

Russell Edward Brand (born 4 June 1975) is an English comedian, actor and media personality. He rose to prominence as a reality television presenter in the early 2000s before starring in major comedy films, releasing several stand-up specials and hosting radio shows. In 2026, he was convicted of rape and sexual assault, and sentenced to 10 years and six months in prison.

Brand hosted Big Brother's Big Mouth, a spin-off of the reality television series Big Brother broadcast on E4. He gained his first major film role in the British comedy St Trinian's (2007), after which he acted in the comedies Forgetting Sarah Marshall (2008), Get Him to the Greek (2010), Arthur (2011) and Rock of Ages (2012), and the mystery film Death on the Nile (2022). He has voiced roles in the Despicable Me franchise (2010–2013; 2022), Hop (2011), Trolls (2016) and Under the Boardwalk (2023). His stand-up specials include Scandalous (2009), Messiah Complex (2013) and Brandemic (2023). He hosted The Russell Brand Show (2006–2008, 2010, 2013, 2017) and the podcasts Stay Free with Russell Brand and Under the Skin with Russell Brand. He has received three British Comedy Awards and a nomination for a BAFTA Award.

Brand has attracted frequent media coverage for his sexual behaviour, drug use, political views, dismissal from MTV, and resignation from the BBC in 2008 amid a prank call controversy involving sexual comments made by Brand and Jonathan Ross about Georgina Baillie. After guest editing the New Statesman in 2013, Brand gained prominence for his political and social activism, focusing on wealth inequality, drug addiction, corporate capitalism, climate change and perceived mainstream media bias. His political direction shifted during the COVID-19 pandemic, as his YouTube channel experienced an increase in activity and he was accused of promoting COVID-19 denialism and conspiracy theories.

In September 2023, following a joint investigation by The Times, The Sunday Times and Channel 4's Dispatches, five women publicly accused Brand of sexual assault and sexual and emotional abuse. The allegations concerned incidents between 2006 and 2013 and were featured in the Dispatches episode Russell Brand: In Plain Sight. A further report was later made to the Metropolitan Police concerning an alleged sexual assault in 2003. Brand denied the allegations and promoted conspiracy theories regarding them. He was subsequently charged with multiple counts of rape, oral rape, indecent assault, and sexual assault. After the initial charges, three further allegations of sexual violence were reported to the Metropolitan Police. In April 2025, he was reported to be the subject of a civil lawsuit filed in New York State accusing him of sexual assault during the 2010 filming of Arthur. Warner Bros. Discovery were named as co-defendants.

In November 2026, Brand was found guilty of one count of rape and three counts of sexual assault at Southwark Crown Court in London. He is expected to be released on licence in 2033, after serving two-thirds of his sentence. Police are considering further charges relating to other allegations.

== Early life ==
Russell Edward Brand was born on 4 June 1975 at Orsett Hospital in Grays, Essex, borough of Thurrock, England. He is the only child of Barbara Elizabeth (née Nichols) and photographer Ronald Henry Brand. Brand's parents separated when he was six months old, and he was raised by his mother.

When Brand was eight, his mother was diagnosed with uterine cancer and then breast cancer one year later. While she underwent treatment, Brand lived with relatives. When he was 14, he developed bulimia nervosa. At age 16, Brand left home because of disagreements with his mother's partner. He then started to use illegal drugs such as cannabis, amphetamines, LSD, and ecstasy. Brand has stated that he had a "strange relationship" with his father, whom he saw sporadically and who took him to visit prostitutes during a trip to Thailand when Brand was a teenager.

Brand made his theatrical debut at the age of 15 in a school production of Bugsy Malone and then began work as a film extra. Brand attended Grays School, and in 1991 he was accepted into the Italia Conti Academy, with his first year of tuition funded by Essex County Council. After that first year, Brand was expelled for illegal drug use and poor attendance. He subsequently attended Drama Centre London. Brand has said that he was sexually abused by a tutor.

== Career ==
=== Stand-up ===
Brand performed stand-up at the Hackney Empire New Act of the Year final in 2000. Although he finished fourth, his performance attracted the attention of agent Nigel Klarfeld of Bound and Gagged Comedy Ltd. That year, he also made his Edinburgh Festival Fringe debut as one-third of the stand-up show Pablo Diablo's Cryptic Triptych, alongside ventriloquist Mark Felgate and Anglo-Iranian comic Shaparak Khorsandi.

In 2004, Brand performed his first one-man show, the confessional Better Now, at the Edinburgh Festival, recounting his heroin addiction. He returned the following year with Eroticised Humour. In 2006, he launched his first nationwide tour, Shame, which drew on embarrassing incidents from his personal life and tabloid coverage of him. The show was released on DVD as Russell Brand: Live. Brand also appeared in a sketch and performed stand-up at Amnesty International's Secret Policeman's Ball in 2006 returning for the 2012 edition at Radio City Music Hall.

In March 2007, Brand co-hosted an evening of the Teenage Cancer Trust gigs. In December 2007, Brand performed for Queen Elizabeth II and Prince Philip as an act in the 2007 Royal Variety Performance. His second nationwide tour, in 2007, was called Russell Brand: Only Joking and released on DVD as Russell Brand: Doin' Life. Brand began performing in the US and recorded a special for Comedy Central titled Russell Brand in New York, which aired in March 2009. Brand began touring the UK, America and Australia from January to April 2009 on a tour called Russell Brand: Scandalous. In October, four additional dates were scheduled for November to raise money for Focus 12, the drug rehabilitation charity of which Brand was a patron until its closure.

In 2013, Brand presented and toured his comedy show Messiah Complex, in which he tackled advertising, the laws on drug addiction and the portrayal of his heroes, such as Gandhi, Guevara, Malcolm X and Jesus, and how he is, in contrived ways, similar to them. In January 2017, Brand announced his new tour Re:Birth, which debuted in April 2017 and was scheduled to run through November 2018. However, on 30 April 2018, he was forced to cancel the remaining dates after his mother was critically injured in a hit-and-run accident. Russell Brand: Re:Birth, which was filmed in London in April 2018, was released as a stand-up comedy film on Netflix on 4 December 2018.

Brand has named Richard Pryor, Bill Hicks, Peter Cook, Lenny Bruce, Tony Hancock, Jack Kerouac, Stewart Lee, Tenacious D, Eddie Murphy, and Monty Python among his comedic influences. In choosing one comedy film among his five favourite movies, he picked Monty Python's Life of Brian (1979). In 2009, he appeared in the television documentary, Monty Python: Almost the Truth (Lawyers Cut).

During a live show at the Royal & Derngate theatre in Northampton in 2008, Brand made a hoax call to a police emergency rape phone line claiming he had seen a man responsible for a series of previously reported public assaults. He told police his name was Sarah, and pretended to be a witness to the assaults. Northamptonshire Police decided not to prosecute and said they would discourage making such calls. The call was condemned by Lynda Yorke of Leicester Rape Crisis Centre, who said: "I don't think that's particularly amusing. It's in very poor taste. The issue of sexual assault is often belittled and such callous behaviour is extremely hurtful to the victims." James Donaghy of The Guardian said it showed "catastrophically poor judgment". Brand apologised for the call.

=== Presenting ===
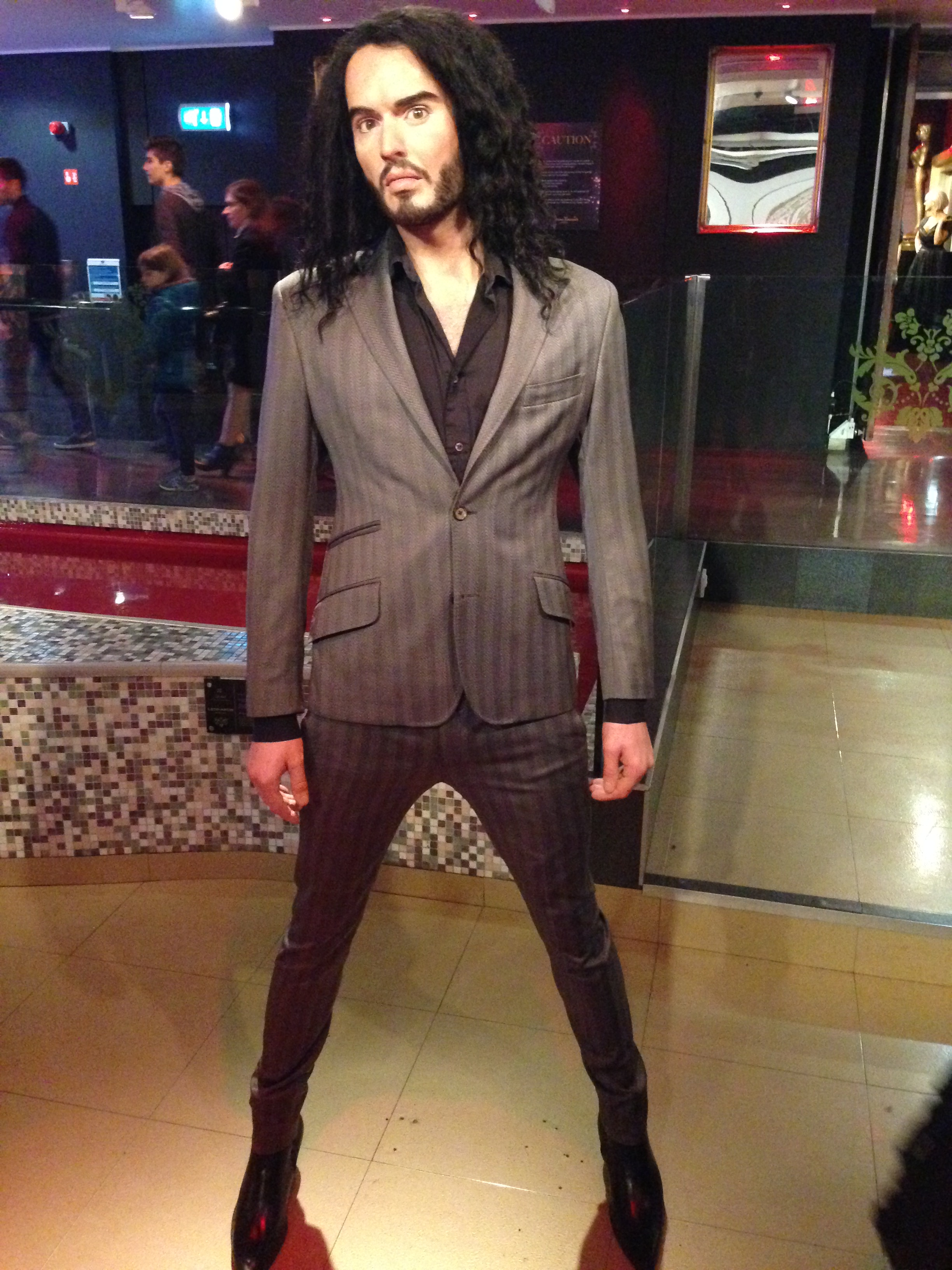
Waxwork of Brand at Madame Tussauds, London

Brand's first presenting role came in 2000 as a video journalist on MTV UK: he presented Dancefloor Chart (touring nightclubs in Britain and Ibiza) and hosted the tea-time request show Select. Brand was dismissed several days after coming to work dressed as Osama bin Laden the day after the 11 September 2001 attacks and bringing his drug dealer to the MTV studios. After leaving MTV, Brand starred in RE:Brand, a documentary and comedy television programme that aimed to explore cultural taboos. It was conceived, written, and hosted by Brand, with the help of his comic partner on many projects, Matt Morgan. The series was shown on the digital satellite channel UK Play in 2002.

In 2004, Brand hosted Big Brother's Eforum on E4, a sister show to Big Brother 5. The show gave celebrity guests and the public the chance to have their say on the goings-on inside the Big Brother house. For Big Brother 6, the show's name changed to Big Brother's Big Mouth. Following Celebrity Big Brother 5, Brand said he would not return to host the Big Brother 8 series of Big Brother's Big Mouth. In a statement, Brand thanked all the producers for "taking the risk of employing an ex-junkie twerp" to front the show. Of his time presenting the show, he said: "The three years I've spent on Big Brother's Big Mouth have been an unprecedented joy". Brand hosted a one-off special called Big Brother According to Russell Brand, in which he took a surreal, sideways look at Big Brother through the ages. On 8 January 2008, Brand was the fifth celebrity to "hijack" the Big Brother house, in the E4 show Big Brother: Celebrity Hijack.

In early 2006, Brand returned to MTV to host the chat show 1 Leicester Square, which had its broadcast time adjusted to accommodate more adult-oriented content. Guests included Tom Cruise, Uma Thurman, The Mighty Boosh, and Boy George, and a second series began in September 2006 on MTV. After Big Brother 7 finished, Brand presented a debate show called Russell Brand's Got Issues, on E4. Despite an extensive promotional campaign, the premiere underperformed and was outpaced by nearly all of E4's main multi-channel competitors. The poor ratings prompted the network to repackage the show as The Russell Brand Show and move it to Channel 4. The first episode was broadcast on 24 November 2006 on Channel 4, and it ran for five weeks.

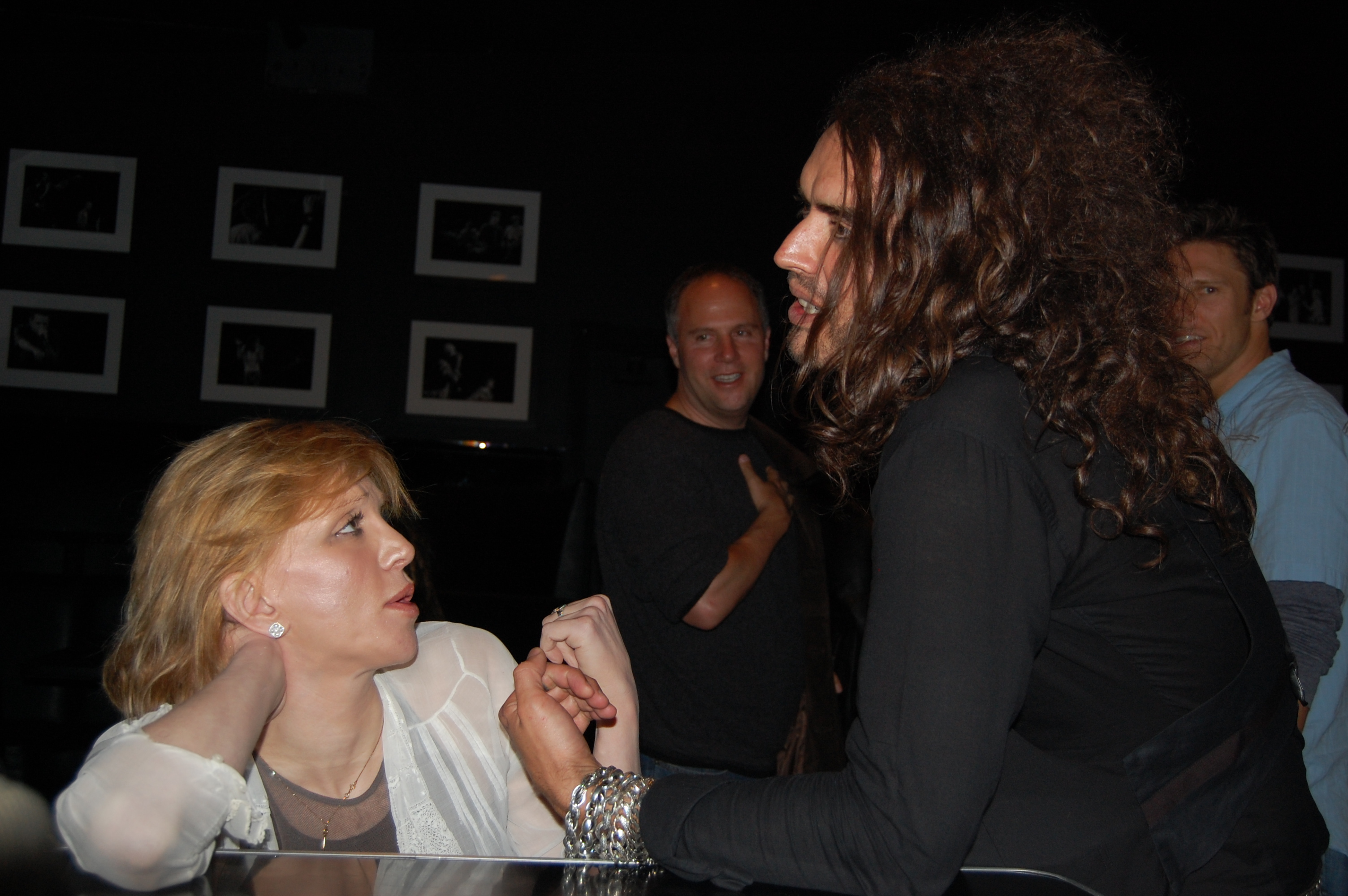
Brand speaking with Courtney Love in Los Angeles, 2008

Brand hosted the 2007 Brit Awards and presented Oasis with an "Outstanding Contribution to Music" award at the event. He also hosted one hour of Comic Relief. On 7 July 2007, he presented at the UK leg of Live Earth at Wembley Stadium, London. On 12 December 2007, BBC Four aired Russell Brand On the Road, a documentary presented by Brand and Matt Morgan about the writer Jack Kerouac and his novel On the Road. Brand returned to Channel 4 to host Russell Brand's Ponderland, in which he discussed topics like childhood and science through stand-up comedy. The show first aired on 22 October 2007 and continued for the next five nights. A second series began on 30 October 2008. The show ran for 12 episodes over the two series.

Brand was later announced as the host of the 2008 MTV Video Music Awards (VMAs), which drew scepticism from the American media, as he was relatively unknown to the American public. Brand's appearance led to controversy for numerous reasons. He said the night "marked the launch of a very new Britney Spears era", referring to it as "the resurrection of [Spears]". He also said, "If there was a female Christ, it's Britney". Brand implored the audience to elect Democratic presidential candidate Barack Obama and later called then–U.S. President George W. Bush "a retarded cowboy fella", who, in England, "wouldn't be trusted with scissors". He also made several references to the purity rings worn by the Jonas Brothers, but apologised for the comments later in the show.

Brand's comments at the 2008 MTV VMAs led to him receiving death threats from some offended viewers. He said that MTV asked him to host the 2009 awards after the ratings for the 2008 show were 20 per cent higher than the previous year. Also in 2008, Brand hosted a one-off stand-up comedy show called Comedy Live Presents: Russell Brand and Friends, which was shown on Channel 4 on 25 January 2008. Brand returned to host the 2009 MTV VMAs, on 13 September 2009, at Radio City Music Hall in New York City. The ratings for the 2009 show were the best since the 2004 VMAs. On 12 February 2011, Brand guest hosted an episode of the American sketch comedy series Saturday Night Live. In 2012, he hosted the MTV Movie Awards and Brand X with Russell Brand, a late-night talk show on FX that received lukewarm reviews and middling ratings. The show was cancelled in 2013 after two seasons.

=== Acting ===
In 1994, while still a teenager, Brand appeared in episodes of The Bill and the children's adventure series Mud. In 2002, Brand appeared on the TV shows Cruise of the Gods and White Teeth. In 2005, he played Tommy in the BBC sitcom Blessed, which was written and directed by Ben Elton. Brand auditioned for the part of Super Hans in the Channel 4 sitcom Peep Show; the role eventually went to Matt King. In 2007, Brand appeared in Cold Blood for ITV, playing an ex-con called Ally. Brand played a recovering crack addict named Terry in the pilot for the ITV comedy The Abbey, written by Morwenna Banks. He voiced an Earth Guardian in Robbie the Reindeer in Close Encounters of the Herd Kind. Brand had a minor role in the film Penelope (2006), although his first major appearance was as Flash Harry in the comedy St Trinian's (2007).

Brand achieved American fame when he starred in the film Forgetting Sarah Marshall (2008), in which he played rock star Aldous Snow, the boyfriend of the title character (played by Kristen Bell). Brand received positive reviews for his performance as Snow, and he revealed the character was changed from an author to a musician because of his audition. Brand starred alongside Adam Sandler in the Disney film Bedtime Stories, which was released on 25 December 2008. In 2010, he reprised the role of Aldous Snow for a buddy comedy titled Get Him to the Greek, co-starring Jonah Hill, which also reunited him with Forgetting Sarah Marshall director Nicholas Stoller and producer Judd Apatow for the film.

Brand starred in Julie Taymor's 2010 version of William Shakespeare's The Tempest, as Trinculo. In 2010, Brand voiced Dr. Nefario in the Universal and Illumination movie Despicable Me, and reprised the role in the 2013 sequel and the 2022 prequel film Minions: The Rise of Gru. Brand also guest starred in The Simpsons episode "Angry Dad: The Movie" as himself. Brand also starred in the April 2011 live action/CGI animated film Hop with James Marsden, voicing the film's protagonist E.B. Hop opened at number one at the Friday box office in the US, earning 11.4 million dollars. The same month, he played the title character in a remake of Arthur, written by Peter Baynham, which was a box office disappointment. Brand starred as Lonny in a film adaptation of the 1980s-set musical Rock Of Ages, released in cinemas in June 2012.

After appearing as William Carr in the Diablo Cody film Paradise (2013), Brand went on hiatus from acting. His return role was as the villainous Creek in the DreamWorks animated film Trolls (2016), followed by his portrayal of God in the comedy Army of One (2016) with Nicolas Cage. In 2018 and 2019, he portrayed Sports X Network founder Lance Klians in a recurring arc in the final two seasons of the HBO series Ballers. Brand appeared as Tristan Trent in the fantasy film Four Kids and It (2020), and in 2022 played Linus Windlesham in Kenneth Branagh's remake of Death on the Nile.

Other projects Brand has been tied to include a remake of Drop Dead Fred; an Adam Sandler-produced film about a con man posing as a priest tentatively entitled Bad Father, co-written by Brand and Matt Morgan; and a film adaptation of the children's television programme Rentaghost, a project that was picked up by Fox Studios in 2011 with Ben Stiller attached.

=== Production ===
As of October 2008, Brand's own production company was called Vanity Projects. The company's latest production, Russell Brand Doing Life, was released in 2009. Brand established another production company in 2011 with his friend Nik Linnen: Branded Films operated from the Warner Bros. studios in Burbank, California, United States. The company's primary focus is to develop films that Brand stars in.

=== Radio ===
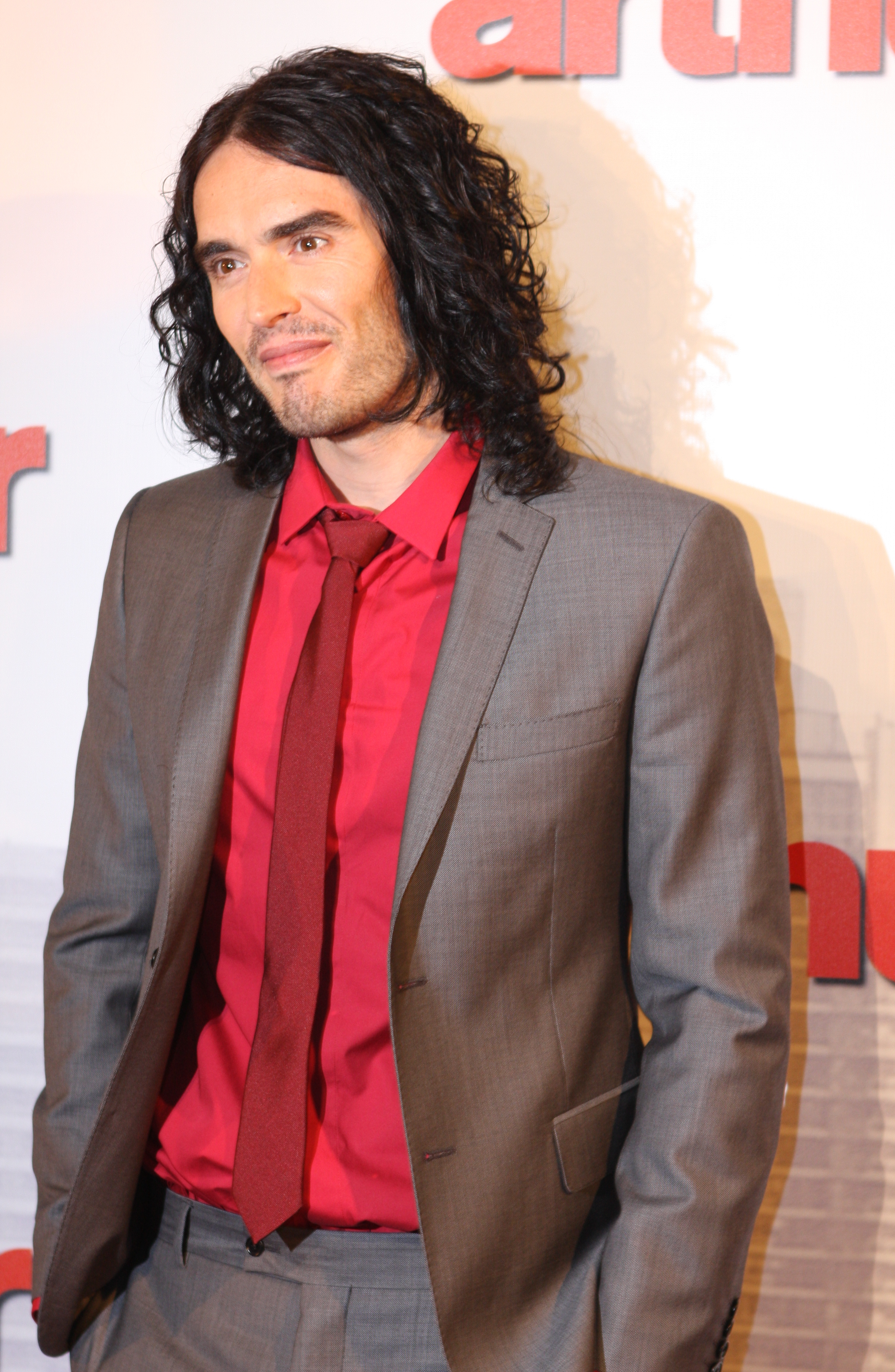
Brand in April 2011

Brand's radio career began in early 2002, when he hosted a Sunday afternoon show with Matt Morgan on London-based alternative rock and indie rock station Xfm. Brand was dismissed from the job after reading pornographic material live on-air. In 2005, Brand co-hosted three one-off shows on BBC Radio 6 Music with Karl Pilkington. Brand then co-hosted The Russell Brand Show beginning in April 2006 on BBC Radio 6 Music. In November 2006, the show transferred to BBC Radio 2 (the BBC Radio 2 show was available as a podcast) and aired on Saturdays from 9–11 pm. The show regularly drew about 400,000 listeners.

On 18 October 2008, on his radio show, Brand and Jonathan Ross broadcast the recording of a series of lewd phone messages for then-78-year-old actor Andrew Sachs. This infamously included Ross saying, "He fucked your granddaughter", a reference to Sachs' granddaughter Georgina Baillie, whom Russell had dated. The comments were broadcast on the pre-recorded show. After little initial interest, a media story about the calls by the Daily Mail generated a high number of complaints. Brand resigned from the BBC, while Ross was suspended without pay. The BBC was later fined £150,000 by Britain's broadcast regulator for airing the calls. On 21 November 2008, the BBC Trust said that the phone calls were a "deplorable intrusion with no editorial justification".

Brand returned to radio when he and Noel Gallagher hosted a one-off football talk show on 19 April 2009 for Talksport. Brand returned to Talksport on 9 October 2010, with a Saturday night show that lasted 20 weeks. The show featured clips and backstage recordings from his Booky Wook 2 promotional tour. Brand was joined by a host of guests, including Gallagher and Ross. On 18 March 2013, Brand returned to radio on Xfm with Matt Morgan for a one-off special in aid of the Teenage Cancer Trust. They were joined by Gallagher, Noel Fielding and Mr Gee with Trevor Lock and David Icke phoning in as guests.

On 30 March 2017 edition of The Chris Moyles Show, Brand announced his return to radio; beginning on 2 April 2017, he hosted the 11 am – 1 pm Sunday slot on Radio X alongside Matt Morgan and Mr Gee. However, in January 2018, the show was placed on indefinite hiatus as Brand concentrated on other commitments. His Sunday morning slot was initially taken over by Danny Wallace's The Important Broadcast.

=== Podcast ===
On 25 February 2015, Brand launched a twice-weekly podcast called The Russell Brand Podcast through audioBoom. The podcast reunited Brand with his radio presenting team of Matt Morgan and poet Mr Gee. The podcast ended after 24 episodes. In 2017, Brand launched a new podcast called Under the Skin with Russell Brand in which he interviewed guests from areas such as academia, popular culture and the arts.

=== Writing ===
From 2006 until 2009, Brand wrote a column for The Guardian sports section that focused on West Ham United and the England national football team. A collection of the columns from 2006 and 2007 was released in 2007 in his book Irons in the Fire. Brand's first autobiography, My Booky Wook, was released on 15 November 2007 and received favourable reviews. Andrew Anthony from The Observer commented that "Russell Brand's gleeful tale of drugs and debauchery in My Booky Wook puts most other celebrity memoirs to shame".

Brand signed a £1.8 million two-book deal with HarperCollins in June 2008. The first book, Articles of Faith, examined Brand's philosophy and consisted of a collection of his columns from The Guardian that first appeared there in 2007 and 2008. The book was published on 16 October 2008 and also includes Brand interviewing Noel Gallagher, James Corden, and David Baddiel about football. The second book for HarperCollins, Booky Wook 2: This Time It's Personal, was Brand's second autobiography and was released on 30 September 2010.

Brand has written comment articles for The Guardian about current events and pop culture, including the deaths of Amy Winehouse and Robin Williams. Brand made his children's book debut in November 2014 with Russell Brand's Trickster Tales: The Pied Piper of Hamelin, featuring illustrations by Chris Riddell. In The Guardian, reviewer Lucy Mangan noted: "The on-Brand need to be noticed is there on every page, his unwillingness to get out of the way of the story tripping the reader up at every turn", adding that Chris Riddell's illustrations "give the book a beauty it does not deserve and a coherence the text does not deliver". Nicholas Tucker, in The Independent, noted the book's "wearingly offensive" language, and commented: "Brand's take on The Pied Piper of Hamelin is the first of a series of riffs on traditional fairy and folk tales. If they are all as bad as this one, British children's books will have hit a new low."

His book Revolution, in which Brand develops his earlier ideas, was published by Random House in October 2014 and received much publicity. Nick Cohen of The Observer called Brand's writing "atrocious: long-winded, confused and smug; filled with references to books Brand has half read and thinkers he has half understood." On the other hand, Steve Richards in The Independent commented: "Brand writes and speaks with verve, words flowing effortlessly and musically. The contrast with the tame wooden prose of elected politicians is marked." In September 2017, Macmillan published Brand's book Recovery: Freedom from Our Addictions. His book, Mentors: How To Help and Be Helped, was published in January 2019. It deals with the people who have had a positive impact on his life and encourages us to look to others to become better individuals.

Following Brand's conviction of rape and sexual assault in November 2026, Pan MacMillan, Hodder & Stoughton, and HarperCollins withdrew his remaining published titles from sale.

=== Product promotion ===
In 2024, Brand promoted a "magic amulet" that he claimed protected against "corruption" by "evil energies" and "lethal signals", in particular those of Wi-Fi. Claims that Wi-Fi signals are harmful are not supported by mainstream scientific evidence.

== Political activism ==
=== 2009–2012: Early interventions ===
In January 2009, Brand participated in a celebrity letter to The Independent—as a supporter of the Hoping Foundation—to condemn Israeli military operations in Gaza, and the "cruel and massive loss of life of the citizens of Gaza". In February 2009, Brand and several other entertainers wrote to The Times in defence of leaders of the Baháʼí Faith, who were on trial in Iran at the time. In April 2009, he attended the 2009 G-20 London summit protests and spoke to the press.

Brand was selected by the Dalai Lama to host the Buddhist leader's 2012 youth event in Manchester. The Dalai Lama's representatives explained that Brand was selected because he had proved "the power of spirituality to effect change in his own life", while Brand stated to the BBC after the event: "I said yes because he's the living incarnation of Buddha and I thought, if you're around the Dalai Lama, that can only be good for your spiritual quest through life. He's an amazing diplomat, an incredible activist, a wonderful human being and an inspiration to us all."

In April 2012, Brand testified in front of a parliamentary committee about drug addiction, sharing his experiences and view that drugs should be decriminalised. He said, "I'm not a legal expert. I'm saying that, to a drug addict, the legal aspect is irrelevant. If you need to get drugs, you will. The criminal and legal status, I think, sends the wrong message. Being arrested isn't a lesson, it's just an administrative blip." Part of this testimony was included in a BBC Three documentary, Russell Brand: From Addiction to Recovery, that aired in December 2012. Brand said he felt compelled to make the film after the 2011 death of Amy Winehouse, and he also used the opportunity to question how British society "deals with addicts and addiction".

=== 2013: New Statesman, Newsnight ===
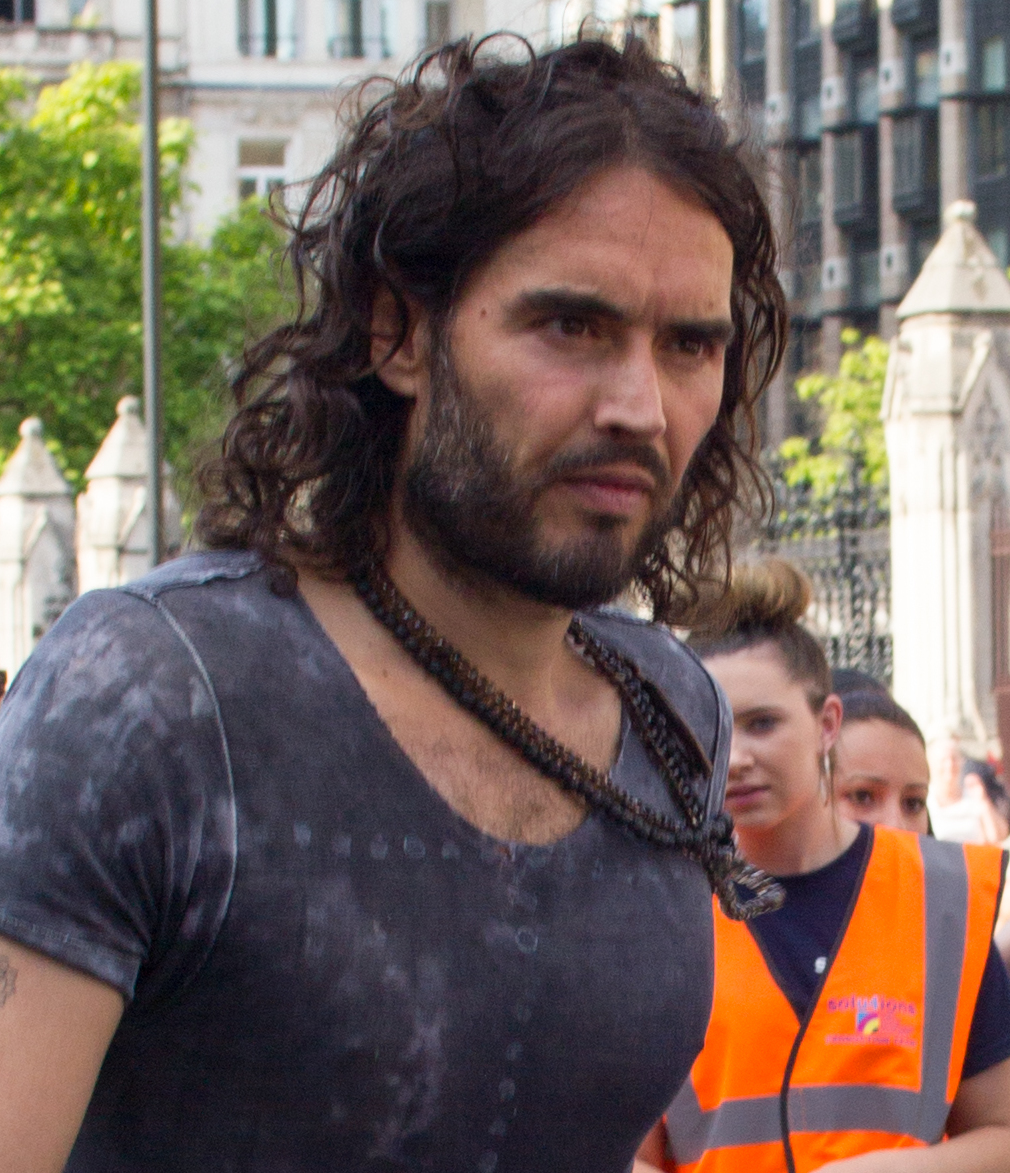
Brand at the London Revolution Protest, June 2014

Brand has frequently campaigned on political issues. In June 2013, he appeared in a video in support of Chelsea Manning. On 3 September 2013, in his acceptance speech at the GQ Awards show after receiving the "Oracle" award, Brand mentioned sponsor Hugo Boss's former business making uniforms for the Gestapo. Brand said of the Nazis, "They did look fucking fantastic, let's face it" before he goose stepped across the stage in a comical imitation of the Nazi march. Brand was ejected from the event after GQ editor Dylan Jones confronted Brand, saying that the speech was "very offensive". Brand replied that the Nazis' treatment of the Jewish people was "very offensive".

Brand guest-edited a special issue of the New Statesman on the theme of revolution, published on 14 October 2013, in which he objected to the destruction of Earth through greed and exploitation, and called for a change in consciousness to accompany political and economic measures to achieve a more sustainable future.

On 23 October 2013, in an interview by Jeremy Paxman for the BBC's Newsnight, Brand disparaged the British political system as ineffectual and encouraged the British electorate not to vote. Brand said that he has never voted and he never will. Paxman challenged Brand about his call for "revolution" and whether someone who had never voted could edit a political magazine. When Paxman asked what a revolution would look like, Brand replied:

A socialist egalitarian system based on the massive redistribution of wealth, [with] heavy taxation of corporations ... I think the very concept of profit should be hugely reduced ... I say profit is a filthy word, because wherever there is a profit there is also a deficit.

In November that year, Brand joined the Anonymous Million Mask March in London that protested against "cuts, corruption and an increase in state surveillance".

=== 2014–2017: The Trews and Revolution ===
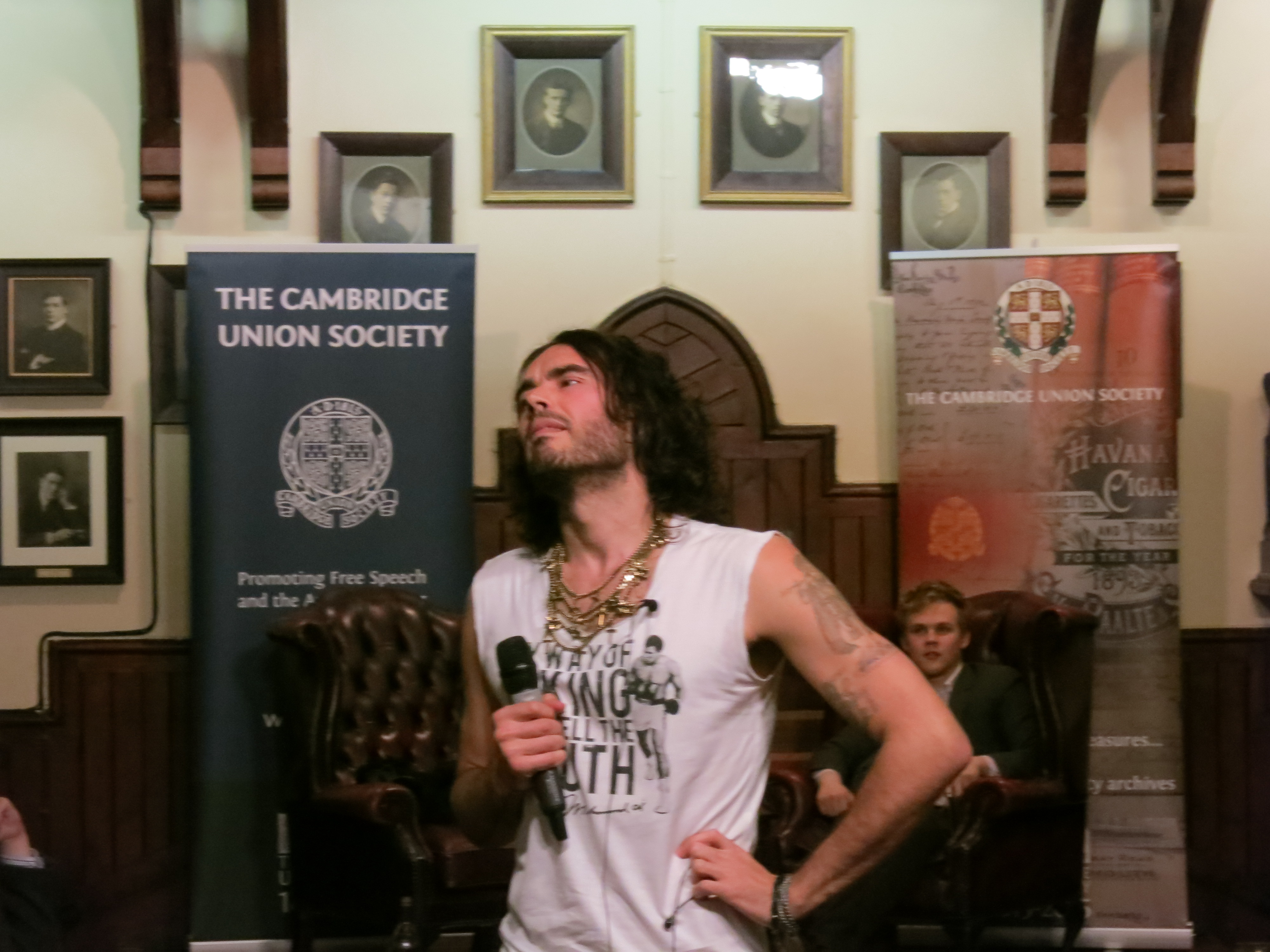
Brand at the Cambridge Union Society, January 2014

In January 2014, Brand was invited by the Cambridge Union Society to participate in an interview. Brand launched his YouTube series The Trews: True News with Russell Brand in 2014. The series was suspended for nearly a year while he took a break from social media to focus on personal and professional development.

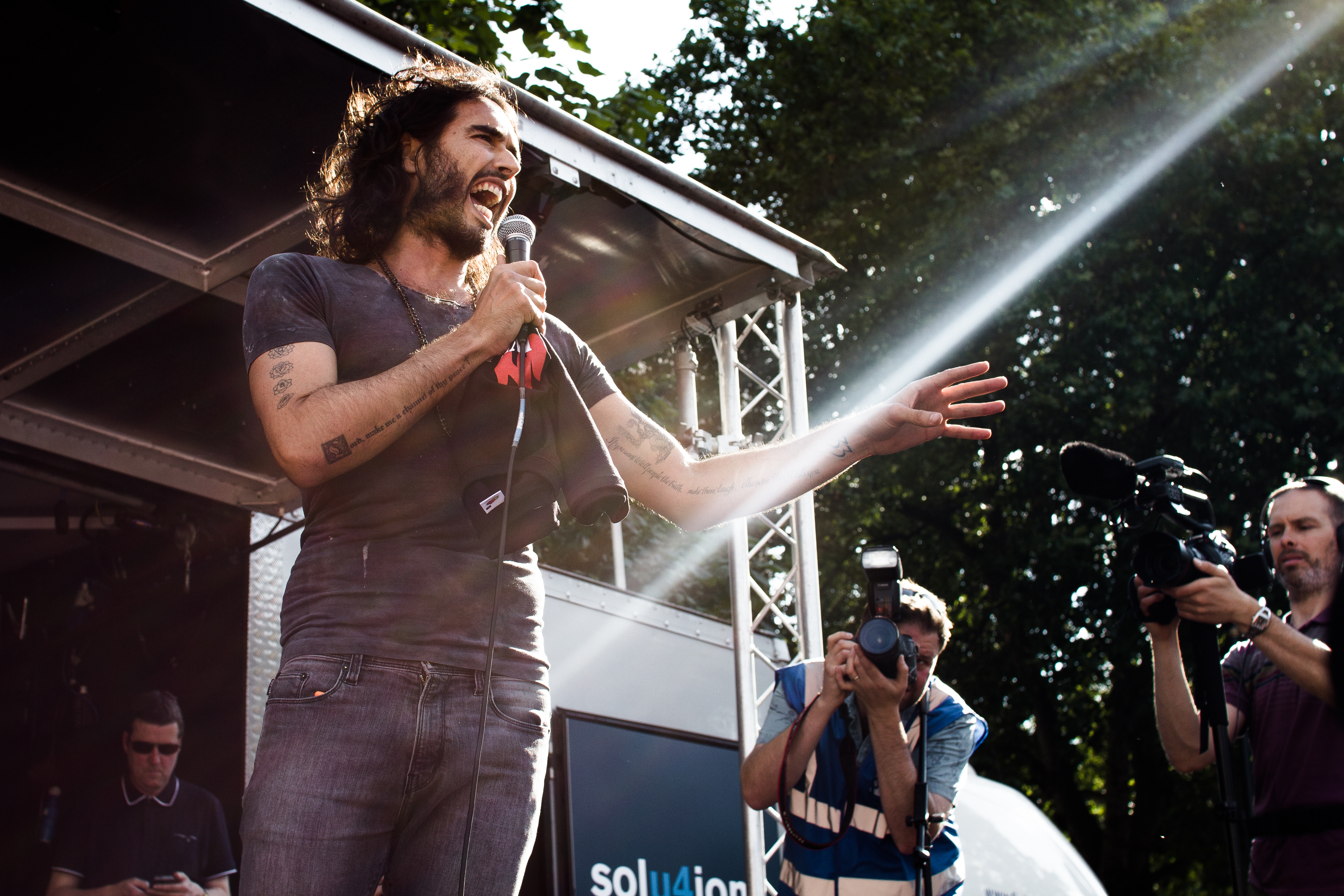
Brand speaking at the People's Assembly Against Austerity rally in London, June 2014

In June 2014, Brand took part in the People's Assembly Against Austerity, which attracted an estimated 50,000 people marching from the BBC office to Westminster. Brand addressed the crowd, saying: "The people of this building [the House of Commons] generally speaking do not represent us, they represent their friends in big business. It's time for us to take back our power. Power isn't there, it is here, within us. The revolution that's required isn't a revolution of radical ideas, but the implementation of ideas we already have."

In October 2014, at the time Brand's book Revolution was published, John Lydon, also known as "Johnny Rotten" of the Sex Pistols, in an interview with Polly Toynbee of The Guardian, said that Brand's advocacy of non-voting is "the most idiotic thing I've ever heard". In a November 2014 YouGov poll, involving a selection of celebrities, Brand was chosen as the one with the most negative influence on political debate (46%). The poll also indicated that 60% of British adults disliked him and 28% liked him.

Shortly afterwards, Brand appeared on Newsnight again, this time interviewed by Evan Davis. Asked about 9/11 conspiracy theories and whether the attacks were perpetrated by the American government, Brand commented: "[w]e have to remain open-minded to [that] kind of possibility", although this section of the interview ended with Brand stating that he did not "want to talk about daft conspiracy theories".

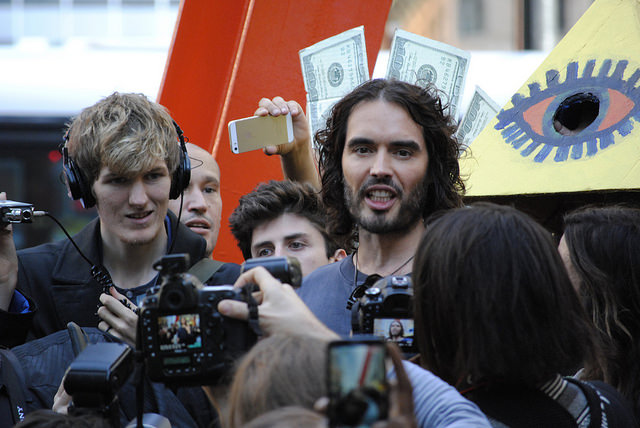
Brand at Zuccotti Park, New York City, October 2014

BBC Three commissioned Brand to make a documentary on the global "war on drugs", which aired on 26 November 2014. The film, titled Russell Brand: End the Drugs War, shows him exploring the policies of other countries in search of a compassionate approach to people who use illicit drugs. Brand said in the documentary, "People think compassion is 'wet liberalism'; it's not, it's pragmatic."

On 2 December 2014, Brand joined East London residents to protest over the increase in rents at the New Era housing estate. During a protest for the New Era residents, Channel 4 News reporter Paraic O'Brien continually pushed Brand to answer questions about the value of his own property, which is rented. The line of questioning irritated Brand, who ended up calling the reporter a "snide"—the short clip went viral on YouTube.

On 11 December, Brand appeared on the BBC's Question Time programme, which included the UK Independence Party's leader Nigel Farage as one of the other panellists. Brand called Farage "a pound shop Enoch Powell" on-air. Farage accused Brand of pushing "long-discredited, even conspiratorial, theories about the City of London" concluding Brand "had very little to give". The two men continued to trade insults after the programme had ended, with both writing articles criticising the other after the debate.

In January 2015, during the television show Channel 4's Big Fat Anniversary Quiz, Brand insulted the politician Ed Balls. Balls responded by calling Brand a "pound shop Ben Elton". In March, Brand announced he would use money from his Revolution book to open a café, the Trew Era Cafe on the New Era estate in the London Borough of Hackney, which would employ recovering drug addicts. The café opened on 26 March 2015, and in September of the following year, Brand donated it to the Rehabilitation for Addicted Prisoners Trust. In March, readers of Prospect magazine voted Brand the fourth-most influential thinker in the world, behind Thomas Piketty, Yanis Varoufakis, and Naomi Klein.

The film documentary Brand: A Second Coming, which reflects on Brand's journey into political activism, premiered at the South by Southwest (SXSW) festival in Austin, Texas, in March 2015. Brand and director Michael Winterbottom worked together to produce a documentary, The Emperor's New Clothes, that had its international premiere on 24 April 2015 at the Tribeca Film Festival. The film features archival footage with appearances by Brand in London and New York City, examining the 2008 financial crisis and global economic inequality. The documentary is produced by Brand's Revolution Films company and distributed by StudioCanal UK.

On 29 April 2015, eight days ahead of the 2015 UK general election, Brand published an interview with Labour leader Ed Miliband on an episode of The Trews. Miliband stated that he took part to win over people like Brand who do not vote, although his opponent David Cameron deemed the entire interview a "joke". The following day, Brand released an interview with Green Party leader Natalie Bennett and Green MP Caroline Lucas, giving his support to Lucas in Brighton and advising its constituents to vote Green.

He released additional material from his discussion with Ed Miliband, stating: "I think we've got no choice but to take decisive action to end the danger of the Conservative party". He dropped his anti-voting position and "declared the importance of voting", backing Labour and telling his fans that "You gotta vote Labour", although he admitted "that he couldn't be sure of the reality of what a Labour government would mean". Brand was not registered to vote in the 2015 election. Brand later endorsed Jeremy Corbyn in the 2015 Labour Party leadership election.

=== 2021–2026: conspiracy theories, conservative activism, and Stay Free ===
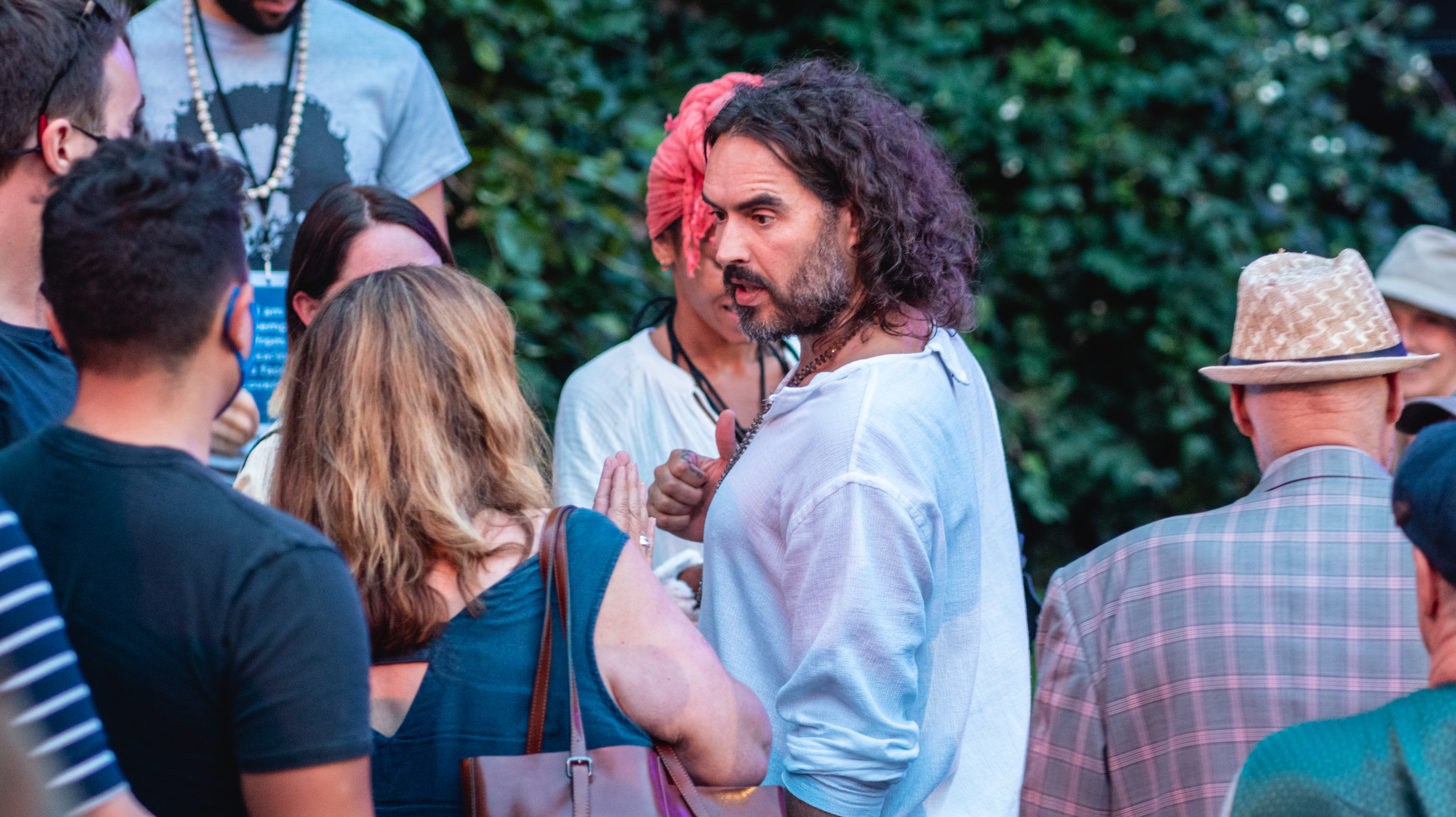
Brand in September 2020

During the COVID-19 pandemic, Brand's YouTube channel underwent an increase in political activity and a rightward and neo-nationalist change in political direction and was accused of promoting COVID-19 denial and other conspiracy theories.

According to culture reporter Louis Chilton, his videos are usually "framed with some sort of contrarian take or calling out hypocrisy in the mainstream media", and often hint "at a vague, world-altering conspiracy". Chilton questioned Brand's motives, suggesting that sceptics might "question why he advertises his stand-up tour just seconds into the start of each clip". In March 2023, Finn McRedmond of The New Statesman described Brand as having now melded his "trad-socialist values" with "all the suspicions and anxieties of the new American right".

In September 2021, Brand told people attending his tour how they could bypass COVID-19 safety measures. The following month, YouTube began reviewing some of Brand's videos to see if they violated the site's COVID-19 vaccine policies. In 2022, Brand reacted to the World Health Organization's meetings on the pandemic treaty, saying "Your democracy is fucking finished" and that the world had "lapsed into a terrible technocratic, globalist agenda". Early that year, Brand released a video decrying the media for allegedly ignoring the Canada convoy protest.

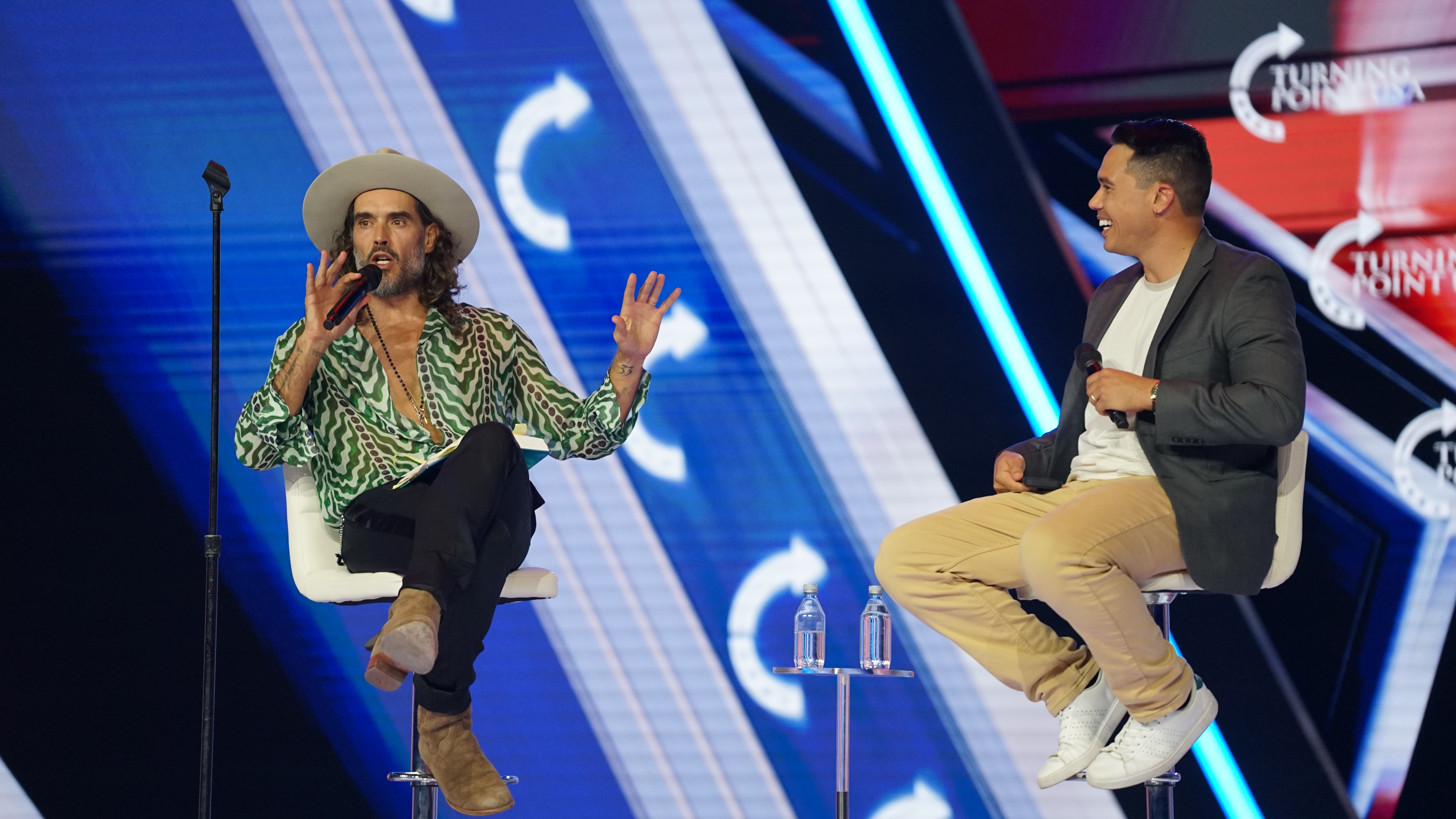
Brand interviewed by Jobob Taeleifi at AmericaFest, 2025

Brand promoted pro-Russian conspiracy theories about the invasion of Ukraine, including unfounded claims of US bioweapon labs in Ukraine. Elon Musk defended Brand from media criticism on Twitter, saying: "I watched some of his videos. Ironically, he seemed more balanced & insightful than those condemning him! The groupthink among major media companies is more troubling. There should be more dissent." When YouTube took down one of his videos in September 2022, citing its policy on medical misinformation, he moved his channel to Rumble, where he launched a new daily live show, Stay Free with Russell Brand.

On 15 May 2024, Brand performed a comedy set at a campaign event for presidential candidate Robert F. Kennedy Jr. for which he was paid around $70,000. In July 2024, he attended the Republican National Convention. In early August of that year, he officially endorsed Kennedy for president. Brand was a prominent speaker at Turning Point USA's AmericaFest 2025, where he made light of Katy Perry's relationship with Justin Trudeau.

== Rape and sexual misconduct allegations and convictions ==
=== Pre-2023 allegations ===
Speaking to the Daily Mirror in 2006 following her appearance on Brand's MTV UK show 1 Leicester Square, Australian pop singer Dannii Minogue described him as "a bit of a vile predator", adding: "I certainly don't think he has cured his sex addiction." She said that Brand "wouldn't take no for an answer" and "throughout the whole interview he kept making shocking remarks that I can't even repeat", and afterwards pestered her for her phone number.

In 2007, on Brand's BBC Radio 2 comedy show, he called former Jim'll Fix It host Jimmy Savile and asked to meet him. Savile answered that that would only happen if Brand brought along his sister if he had one. In response, Brand joked: "I've got a personal assistant ... and part of her job description is that anyone I demand she greet, meet, massages, she has to do it. She's very attractive, Jimmy". When he asked Savile what she should wear, Savile replied he would "prefer her to wear nothing". The exchange between Brand and Savile was featured in the 2023 Channel 4 Dispatches documentary Russell Brand: In Plain Sight.

From 2006 to 2008, Brand received two complaints while he was a BBC radio host and presenter of both sexual misconduct and unprofessional workplace behaviour, with a further six complaints received afterwards. In 2014, former girlfriend Jordan Martin said Brand had committed sexual assault and physical and emotional abuse during their six-month relationship in 2007. She accused Brand of assaulting her at the Lowry Hotel in Salford when he became angry after discovering she had spoken to an ex-boyfriend.

In June 2014, a masseuse accused Brand of assault at his home, and treating her "like a prostitute". Thames Valley Police closed the investigation without charges. Brand and his then partner Jemima Goldsmith won a High Court injunction for harassment. After Brand's 2026 conviction, the think tank Tax Policy Associates published the injunction, revealing that it prohibits the accuser from discussing the alleged assault with anyone except her legal advisers or doctors. Goldsmith discussed the alleged events in 2026, saying that she "did not see anything untoward" from Brand, and allegedly received antisemitic threats from the accuser.

While filming a programme with Brand in 2018, Katherine Ryan reportedly made remarks to Brand that he was a "sexual predator" that were not broadcast. She discussed these comments on Louis Theroux Interviews (Series 1, Episode 5), broadcast in November 2022, stating: "...I informed him to his face, that he was a predator", and: "...this person I believe very strongly, so do a lot of people believe very strongly, it is an open secret, is a perpetrator of sexual assault"; however, still without naming him, she remarked: "It is a litigious minefield".

=== Sunday Times/Channel 4 investigation (2023) ===
==== Release ====
Early in 2019, The Sunday Times began inquiries after becoming aware of allegations of sexual misconduct against Brand. In 2022, Channel 4's Dispatches began working with The Sunday Times and The Times to investigate the allegations. On 16 September 2023, following the joint investigation, allegations were published from four women anonymously, accusing Brand of sexual assaults and emotional abuse between 2006 and 2013. The youngest of the women alleging abuse was aged 16 (the age of consent throughout the UK) at the time of the alleged abuse, while Brand was 31. Most of the women, who The Times said do not know each other, have chosen to remain anonymous in fear of public harassment, however in November 2026, the woman who was 16, Mia Latter, from I'm Alice rescinded her anonymity to campaign for a graduated age of consent, law change.

A fifth woman has accused Brand of flashing his genitals at her. The Sunday Times noted that several of the accusers "felt compelled" to speak out "given Brand's newfound prominence as an online wellness influencer".

The reports noted that complaints about Brand's behaviour had been made to Lesley Douglas, then controller of BBC Radio 2, in 2007, after Brand allegedly urinated into a bottle "in full view of everyone" in the BBC Radio 2 studio and hurled objects "in fits of rage". Brand allegedly pursued female audience members for sex and exposed himself to a crew member on the shows EFourum and Big Brother's Big Mouth. Production company Endemol and Channel 4 released statements of regret, saying in part: "We are sorry these women did not feel supported and protected while working on these productions and in light of these serious allegations encourage them to contact us in confidence".

The Times and Dispatches allegation of Brand having sex with a 16-year-old was later confirmed by Brand. In a 2026 interview, Brand admitted to having sex with a 16‑year‑old when he was 30, saying that his fame and addiction created an "opportunity for endless consent" that led him to be an "exploiter of women". The woman stated that she began a relationship with Brand when she was 16 and Brand was 31. She alleged that Brand referred to her as "the child" in the company of his entourage and instructed her not to tell her school friends about their relationship. She further alleged that Brand forced his penis down her throat until she was unable to breathe, leading her to fight him off.

==== Reactions and aftermath ====
Brand responded by denying any criminal wrongdoing, saying his relationships "were absolutely always consensual" while stemming from a period of time when he was "very, very promiscuous". He said that he had been contacted by The Sunday Times and Channel 4 prior to the story's publication and that their reporting contained "a litany" of "astonishing, rather baroque attacks" and "some very serious allegations that I absolutely refute".

On 16 September 2023, Brand performed at Troubadour Wembley Park Theatre in London. Brand told the audience: "I really appreciate your support. I love you. There are obviously some things I absolutely cannot talk about – and I appreciate that you will understand". On 18 September 2023, all remaining dates on the tour were postponed. Brand was also dropped by his agent Tavistock Wood amid the accusations. Wood released a statement, writing in part: "Russell Brand categorically and vehemently denied the allegation made in 2020, but we now believe we were horribly misled by him."

YouTube said on 19 September that it had suspended Brand's ability to make money from his account; a spokesperson said: "This decision applies to all channels that may be owned or operated by Russell Brand." The director general of the BBC, Tim Davie, announced an internal review of complaints against Brand during his time working for the organisation. The BBC had already removed some material featuring Brand from its archive. The CEO of the media platform Rumble, Chris Pavlovski, on 21 September, instead said the company would not "join a cancel culture mob". Pavlovski rejected a House of Commons Media Committee request to join YouTube in removing the monetisation from Brand's channels "based solely on these media accusations"; he also stated that the parliament's request was "extremely disturbing".

Television presenter Vanessa Feltz released a clip of her appearance on Brand's TV show in 2006, where he asked if he could "have it off" with her or her daughters, which left her "deeply offended". Lorraine Kelly said she felt uncomfortable during an appearance on The Graham Norton Show after Brand touched her thigh and called her a "slut" in 2007. On 21 September 2023, a woman accused Brand of exposing himself to her at the BBC's Los Angeles office in 2008 and then laughing about it minutes later on his Radio 2 show.

=== Civil actions ===
In November 2023, a woman accused Brand of exposing himself and later trapping and assaulting her in a bathroom during the production in 2010 of the comedy film Arthur (2011). She was an extra on the film and brought forth a lawsuit against him and Warner Bros. Discovery. On 3 November 2023, the lawsuit was filed against Brand under New York's Adult Survivors Act, which allowed victims of sexual offences for which the statute of limitations had lapsed a period of one year to file a suit. Warner Bros. and others involved in Arthur's production were also named as defendants for neglecting, aiding and abetting misconduct by Brand on the set.

On 6 February 2025, Brand was sued for sexual abuse at the High Court of Justice in London. On 7 April 2025, news outlets reported Brand to be the subject (among others) of the previously mentioned civil action case filed in New York state, accusing him of sexual assault while intoxicated during the filming of Arthur. The Independent reported that the plaintiff alleged Brand had "exposed his genitalia to her and followed her to a bathroom while intoxicated on set and assaulted her". As the two legal actions were filed separately, concerns were raised that they might prejudice each other. Whilst a delay request by Brand's legal team was rejected, the deadline to submit his deposition for the US lawsuit has been extended to 30 October 2025. Brand denied the allegation, claiming he had been sober for "approximately eight years" at the time of the incident. Warner Bros. was also named on the lawsuit, accused of negligence.

=== Rape and sexual assault charges ===
After having encouraged anyone "who believes themself to have been a victim of sexual assault" to come forward, the Metropolitan Police received on 17 September 2023 an allegation of sexual assault against Brand said to have taken place in Soho, London, in 2003. The alleged incident predated the period of alleged incidents covered in The Sunday Times and Channel 4 investigations. On 16 November 2023, Brand was questioned by police in connection with alleged sexual assaults. In November 2024, detectives investigating allegations of offences between 2006 and 2013 sent the Crown Prosecution Service a file of evidence so the prosecutors could consider bringing charges against him.

On 4 April 2025, Brand was charged by the Metropolitan Police with one count of rape, one count of indecent assault, one count of oral rape and two counts of sexual assault. The charges related to alleged offences against four women, with the incidents alleged to have occurred in Westminster and Bournemouth between 1999 and 2005. Brand posted a video denying the charges, saying: "I'm now going to have the opportunity to defend these charges in court and I'm incredibly grateful for that." Also on 4 April, following the charges, an additional three women reported to the Metropolitan Police that Brand had sexually assaulted and abused them. In the days following his charges, Brand was "indefinitely" suspended from his role as an ambassador for the Tiggywinkles Wildlife Hospital charity and dropped as a celebrity spokesperson for the American Catholic meditation and prayer app Hallow.

On 2 May 2025, Brand appeared at Westminster Magistrates' Court for his first hearing, and was granted bail. He spoke only to confirm his name, date of birth, address, and to confirm he understood his bail conditions. Outside of court he continued to dispute the charges. The case was referred to the Old Bailey, with the next hearing set for 30 May 2025. On that date, he entered a plea of not guilty, with the trial initially scheduled to begin on 16 June 2026. In December 2025, the Crown Prosecution Service authorised two further charges against Brand—one count of rape and one count of sexual assault—relating to two additional women. After appearing via video link at Westminster Magistrates' Court on 20 January 2026, he was granted bail for the two new charges. He appeared at Southwark Crown Court on 17 February 2026. On 30 March 2026, his trial was rescheduled to October of that year.

=== 2026 trial and conviction ===
Brand stood trial for rape and sexual assault from October 2026, at Southwark Crown Court in London; the offences he was charged with took place between 1999 and 2009. Mr Justice Bennathan, the judge, selected a jury of eight men and four women. Riel Karmy-Jones KC, set out the prosecution's case for the crown, and all six female accusers concluded their graphic courtroom evidence anonymously under oath. The women were each questioned by the Brand defence team, led by Ian Winter KC. The judge ruled on 27 October that due to lack of evidence one charge of indecent assault should be amended to "attempted indecent assault", to which Brand pleaded not guilty.

Brand gave evidence on his own behalf, declaring from the witness box that sexual consent is "fundamental, essential, necessary and in many ways, more important than sex itself". His wife, Laura, testified that he is a "kind and wonderful father" and when asked by her husband's KC, if Brand respected her when she did not want to be sexual with him, she responded: "Yes absolutely". The court also heard from Elia Alvarez Diaz, who was previously in a relationship with Brand that ended in 1999. She described him as both "loving" and "gentle". The judge legally directed the jury that they would have to consider "rival arguments". In closing for the prosecution, Riel Karmy-Jones KC accused Brand of using "gaslighting" to "great effect" by asking some of his accusers for their phone numbers or emails after the alleged assaults.

On 5 November 2026, Brand was convicted of one count of rape and three counts of sexual assault and remanded in custody. The twelve jurors deliberated for nine hours and 13 minutes, and reached unanimous verdicts:

Count	Charge	Verdict
Count 1	Rape	Not guilty
Count 2A	Attempted indecent assault	Not guilty
Count 3	Sexual assault	Guilty
Count 4	Rape	Not guilty
Count 5	Sexual assault	Guilty
Count 6	Rape	Guilty
Count 7	Sexual assault	Guilty

The rape conviction related to a 2009 encounter with a fan who visited him at his home. During consensual vaginal sex, Brand turned her over, initiated anal sex and continued after she repeatedly told him to stop. She bled afterwards and told friends and family about the rape.

Following the verdict, Brand's application for bail was rejected by the judge. Brand was sentenced on 9 November to 10 years and six months' imprisonment, comprising nine years for rape and terms of 18 months, nine months, and eight months for the three sexual assault offences, to be served concurrently with each other and consecutively to the rape term. Following sentencing, he was imprisoned at HM Prison Wandsworth and was later moved to HM Prison Littlehey. He is due to be released after serving two-thirds of the sentence, equivalent to seven years, after which he is expected to serve the remainder on licence and will be permanently on the Sex Offender Register.

On the day of his conviction, it was also reported that police were investigating two further rape allegations involving Brand and that he had previously been interviewed under caution in connection with them.

On 12 November, six more women came forward with allegations of sexual misconduct and predatory behaviour by Brand. On the same day, Meta disabled social media accounts belonging to him on its platforms. On 13 November, four days after Brand's sentencing, Netflix released a documentary entitled Russell Brand: Open Secret, which contained further allegations of sexual and physical abuse from Brand's former partners. The documentary also contained a new accusation from Brand's former roommate Mark Pinheiro, who claimed he had witnessed Brand sexually assaulting an unidentified woman in the 1990s.

Following his arrest, Laura (Russell Brand's wife) shared a message from him in a podcast. Brand appealed to Christians, protested his innocence and identified HMP Littlehey as his prison. The Ministry of Justice launched an investigation into the unauthorised communication, warning that Laura Brand could face restrictions on visits or contact with her husband.

== Other legal issues ==
=== Illegal drug use ===
During Brand's period of active substance use, media coverage focused primarily on drug-related incidents, creating a lasting public association with this era. Drug-related issues led to his arrest on 12 occasions. Brand was ejected from the Gilded Balloon in Edinburgh and following a subsequent show in the city in 2004, a reviewer stated that "you'd rather hug him than hit him", as he had embraced recovery by this point. Following the cessation of his use, Brand revealed through his stand-up performances that he introduced his drug dealer to Kylie Minogue during his time at MTV and said he had performed manual sex on a male stranger in a public toilet for a television programme, adding: "I must say, it wasn't for me. I didn't really enjoy it. My tendencies and inclinations towards women are very, very powerful. I like them very much. It's just a biological urge."

Brand was a patron of the Focus 12 drug treatment programme and rehabilitation charity after his own use of the service; the charity closed in 2018. Brand's sobriety was instigated by his agent, John Noel, after Brand was apprehended using heroin in a bathroom during a Christmas party. Brand cites his practice of transcendental meditation as a significant factor in his recovery from drug dependence. Brand organised three fundraisers for Focus 12 in London, Dublin, and Belfast in 2009 and has also acted as a "sponsor" for numerous people during the rehabilitation stage of their treatment process.

=== Alleged battery and criminal damage charges ===
On 16 September 2010, Brand was arrested on suspected battery charges after he allegedly attacked a photographer who blocked his and then-fiancée Katy Perry's way to catch a flight at Los Angeles International Airport. The photographer placed Brand under citizen's arrest until the police arrived and he was released from custody the next day after posting US$20,000 bail.

On 15 March 2012, an arrest warrant was issued for Brand in New Orleans because of allegations that he had thrown a photographer's mobile phone through a window. The photographer was taking pictures of Brand with an iPhone when Brand wrestled the device from his hands and tossed it at a law firm's window. The warrant cited "simple criminal damage to property", leading Brand, who offered to pay for the replacement of the window, to voluntarily appear at a police station. Brand was filming a movie in New Orleans at the time of the incident.

== Personal life ==
Brand has been diagnosed with attention deficit hyperactivity disorder (ADHD) and bipolar disorder. He also said he has had bulimia and pornography addiction, and experienced a period of self-harming. Brand showed interest in the Hare Krishna movement and wrote in a 2007 Guardian column: "I say Hare Krishna as often as possible, sometimes even when I'm not being filmed."

Brand was formerly a Buddhist. Speaking to The Guardian's Miranda Sawyer in 2017, he said he believed in a higher power, and his new faith was the 12 steps of Alcoholics Anonymous (AA). He later gravitated towards Christian spirituality and practice by daily reciting the Lord's Prayer and attempting to have Christ consciousness. Brand became a Christian and was baptised by Bear Grylls in the River Thames on 28 April 2024. In the October 2014 issue of Vanity Fair, Brand said of the allegations of misogyny made against him:

I have lived a life and had a frame of cultural references that make that charge quite legitimate... But as a person who's trying to live a decent, spiritual life, misogyny is not part of my current palette of behaviors... In a way, redemption is a great part of my narrative. I'm talking about disavowing previous lives, previous beliefs, previous behaviors.

Since 2016, Brand trained in the martial art of Brazilian jiu-jitsu and earned a purple belt in the discipline. He credits the art with improving his life in several ways. At the time of his 2017 wedding, Brand lived near Henley-on-Thames. Brand was the owner of The Crown Inn pub in Pishill, a village near his Henley-on-Thames home, but sold it in April 2026. In 2011, Brand served as best man at Noel Gallagher's wedding to Sara MacDonald. Brand is an avid supporter of West Ham United football club.

=== Relationships ===
Brand first met American singer Katy Perry in mid-2009 when she filmed a cameo for Get Him to the Greek (2010), although the cameo was cut from the film. They began dating after meeting again at the 2009 MTV Video Music Awards in September. The two became engaged on New Year's Eve 2009 during a holiday in India and married there on 23 October 2010 in a Hindu ceremony near the Ranthambhore tiger sanctuary in Rajasthan. On 30 December 2011, Brand filed for divorce, citing irreconcilable differences. Their divorce was finalised in July 2012.

Perry's July 2012 autobiographical documentary, Katy Perry: Part of Me, showed the couple having conflicting career schedules and Perry not feeling ready to have children. Perry later said in an interview that Brand did not like the idea of her "being the boss" of things, and that the last time she had heard from him was on 31 December 2011, when he sent her a text message saying he was divorcing her. Days after his divorce was finalised, Brand said in an interview with Howard Stern that he was extremely in love with Perry, but after marrying her realised "this isn't really working out ... I was really, really in love with her, but it was difficult to see each other ... it mostly didn't work for practical reasons." While Stern pressed for details, Brand declined, saying: "I don't want anything to hurt her. She's younger than me, she's a young woman and she's beautiful and she's sensitive and I care about her deeply." Brand, who married Perry without a prenuptial agreement, was eligible to claim half of the estimated $44 million she earned during their marriage but declined.

From 2013 to 2014, he was in a relationship with Jemima Goldsmith. After The Sun printed a story in November 2013 alleging that he had been unfaithful to her, Brand received unspecified libel damages from the paper in May 2014, which he said he would donate to the Hillsborough Justice Campaign. The pair ended their relationship in September 2014. After Brand's 2026 conviction, Goldsmith alleged that Brand was violent and abusive, and that she once called the police on him but did not pursue charges.

Since 2015, Brand has been in a relationship with the blogger and former restaurateur Laura Gallacher, the sister of television presenter Kirsty Gallacher and daughter of former Scottish professional golfer Bernard Gallacher. Brand and Laura Gallacher first dated in 2007, when she was 19 and he was 31. Their first daughter was born in 2016. Brand married Gallacher in Henley-on-Thames on 26 August 2017. Their second daughter was born in 2018 and their third child, a son, was born in 2023.

== Filmography ==
=== Film ===
Year	Title	Role	Notes
2006	Penelope	Sam	
2007	St Trinian's	Flash Harry	
2008	Forgetting Sarah Marshall	Aldous Snow	
2008	Bedtime Stories	Mickey	
2010	Get Him to the Greek	Aldous Snow	
2010	Despicable Me	Dr. Nefario (voice)	
2010	The Tempest	Trinculo	
2011	Hop	E.B. (voice) / Production Assistant	
2011	Arthur	Arthur Bach	
2012	Rock of Ages	Lonny Barnett	
2012	Katy Perry: Part of Me	Himself	Uncredited cameo
2013	Despicable Me 2	Dr. Nefario (voice)	
2013	Paradise	William	
2014	A Royal Hangover	Himself	
2015	Brand: A Second Coming	Himself	
2015	The Emperor's New Clothes	Himself	
2016	Army of One	God	
2016	Trolls	Creek (voice)	
2018	The Fight	The Guru	
2020	Four Kids and It	Tristan Trent	
2022	Death on the Nile	Windlesham	
2022	Minions: The Rise of Gru	Dr. Nefario (voice)	
2022	Catherine Called Birdy	Suitor from Kent	
2023	Under the Boardwalk	Mako (voice)	
2026	Russell Brand: Open Secret	Himself	

=== Television ===
Year	Title	Role	Notes
1994	The Bill	Billy Case	Episode: "Land of The Blind"
1994	Mud	Shane	6 episodes
2002	White Teeth	Merlin	Episode: "The Peculiar Second Marriage of Archie Jones"
2002	RE:Brand	Host	7 episodes
2002	Cruise of the Gods	Woolly Hat Fan	TV film
2004	A Bear's Christmas Tail	Mr. Wolf	TV film
2004–2006	Big Brother's Big Mouth	Host	53 episodes
2005–2007	Celebrity Big Brother's Big Mouth	Presenter	16 episodes
2006	Russell Brand's Got Issues	Host	6 episodes
2006, 2007 2009, 2015	The Big Fat Quiz of the Year	Himself	TV special
2007	The Abbey	Terry	TV film
2007	Cold Blood	Ally Parkins	Episode: "Interference"
2007–2009	Russell Brand's Ponderland	Host	12 episodes
2008	2008 MTV Video Music Awards	Host	TV special
2009	2009 MTV Video Music Awards	Host	TV special
2011	Big Time Rush	Himself	Episode: "Big Time Beach Party"
2011	Saturday Night Live	Himself/host	Episode: "Russell Brand/Chris Brown" (Season 36)
2012	2012 MTV Movie Awards	Host	TV special
2012	Russell Brand: From Addiction to Recovery	Himself	BBC Three Documentary
2012–2013	Brand X with Russell Brand	Host	25 episodes
2014	Russell Brand: End the Drugs War	Presenter	BBC Three Documentary
2017	Hospital People	Tyler Watt	Episode: "The Health Guru"
2018	Celebrity Juice	Panelist	Episode: "#19.1"
2018–2019	Ballers	Lance Klians	14 episodes
2020	Neighbours	Himself	Episode: "#1.8385"

== Awards ==
Award	Award category	Year	Result	Refs.
Time Out	Best Stand-Up	2006	Won	
Loaded Lafta Awards	Best Stand-Up	2006	Won	
British Comedy Awards	Best Newcomer	2006	Won	
33rd Annual Television and Radio Awards	Best Television Performer in a Non-Acting Role	2007	Won	
British Comedy Awards	Best Live Stand-Up	2008	Won	
Variety's Power of Comedy Award		2010	Won	
British Comedy Awards	Outstanding Contribution to Comedy	2011	Won	
Golden Raspberry Awards	Worst Actor (for Arthur)	2012	Nominated	
GQ Men of the Year Awards	Oracle	2013	Won	
Foot in Mouth Award	Quote (Note: "The internal mayhem I'm feeling is spilling out everywhere. I loved it, and felt very connected to activism – particularly activism that feels loaded with potential. Not the oppositional activism that seems like there's a stasis around it – earnestly sincere, but a monolith equal to the establishment.")	2014	Won	

== Stand-up DVDs ==
- Live (20 November 2006)
- Doing Life – Live (26 November 2007)
- Scandalous – Live at the O2 (9 November 2009)
- Live in New York City (21 November 2011)
- Messiah Complex (25 November 2013)
- Brandemic (15 March 2023)

== Written works ==
- My Booky Wook. London: Hodder & Stoughton. 2007. ISBN 978-0-340-93615-3.
- Irons in the Fire. London: Hodder & Stoughton. 2007. ISBN 978-0-340-96136-0.
- Articles of Faith. London: HarperCollins. 2008. ISBN 978-0-00-729881-5.
- Booky Wook 2: This Time It's Personal. London: HarperCollins. 2010. ISBN 978-0-00-729882-2.
- Revolution. New York: Ballantine. 2014. ISBN 978-1-10-188291-7.
- The Pied Piper of Hamelin: Russell Brand's Trickster Tales. Simon & Schuster/Atria. 2014. ISBN 978-1476791890.
- Recovery: Freedom from Our Addictions. London: Picador. 2018. ISBN 978-1250182456.
- Mentors: How to Help and Be Helped. London: Pan Macmillan. 2019. ISBN 978-1509850884.

== Notes ==
Media offices
Preceded by no host	MTV Video Music Awards host 2008; 2009	Succeeded by Chelsea Handler
Preceded by Jason Sudeikis	MTV Movie Awards host 2012	Succeeded by Rebel Wilson
