= A Royal Hangover =

- Directed by: Arthur Cauty
- Produced by: Arthur Cauty
- Starring: Russell Brand; Sarah Jarvis; Carrie Armstrong
- Release date: 2014
- Running time: 102 minutes
- Country: United Kingdom
- Language: English

A Royal Hangover is a 2014 documentary film written and directed by Arthur Cauty and co-produced by Silver Levy-So that explores alcoholism in Britain, examining why the country faces such severe problems relating to alcohol and the taboo issues relating to it.

== Development ==
Cauty originally got the idea for the film when visiting the United States in 2012, and seeing how different the attitude to alcohol there was to that in the UK. On one night of filming, Cauty and Levy-So were attacked by around four or five people but they continued rolling. Law enforcement would also occasionally interrupt the shooting process. The involvement of Russell Brand helped the film to become more widely noticed. Other interviewees included Government Drugs Advisor Professor David Nutt, BBC TV and Radio personality Dr Sarah Jarvis, and leading British charities Alcohol Concern, Alcohol Research and Druglink.

Brand came on board after parts of the film were shot at the rehabilitation centre Focus 12, which Brand attended. Other filming locations included London, Liverpool, Bristol, Wales, Los Angeles, Paris and Devon (where the filmmakers are from).

Total development on the film lasted around one and a half years. Cauty and Levy-So themselves are non-drinkers but are fascinated by drinking culture, particularly, by the huge role that it plays in British society, which motivated Cauty to make the film. A Royal Hangover is his feature debut. He hopes that after watching the film people will "see alcohol as a drug not as just a beverage or a form of entertainment".

Research for the film began in November 2012, which is when fellow filmmaker, "soberist" and friend Silver Levy-So came on board as associate producer and camera operator, filming then began in April 2013.

A trailer for the film was released on 15 September 2014. It received huge response and support from just weeks after release.

== Release ==
The film premiered on 12 October 2014 at the Sunscreen Film Festival in Los Angeles. Other screenings occurred at the Reel Recovery Film Festival in Florida, the Cleveland International Film Festival in Ohio and the Piccadilly Cinema in Adelaide, Australia. It was also the opening film for the Cape Town Recovery Film Festival in 2015.

It was picked up by Journeyman Pictures and released on iTunes.

The film is also available on Amazon Prime.

== Critical reception ==
A Royal Hangover received positive reviews from critics. The Huffington Post said "if you understand alcohol abuse, or want to understand. Then give it a go...Because it really is the only documentary on drinking worth watching." Recovery Rocks said "A Royal Hangover is a film that is long over due. With wit and insight it creates an alarming and frank portrait of Britain's binge drinking problem".
