= Empire Square =

- From left to right: Hooks, Ritchie, and Rabbit
- Created by: Matt Morgan
- Written by: Matt Morgan
- Directed by: Ant Cauchi; Dave Rowntree; Lloyd Salmons
- Starring: Daisy Haggard; Alex Parry; Matt Wilkinson
- Country of origin: United Kingdom
- No. of episodes: 12 (Channel 4); 6 (Fuse)

Production
- Running time: 2-4 minutes (Channel 4); 30 minutes (Fuse)
- Production company: Coolie

Original release
- Network: Channel 4 (UK); Fuse (US)
- Release: February 19, 2005 – May 23, 2006

Empire Square (abbreviated Empire Sq.) is a British animated TV series created by Matt Morgan made with pixel graphics. It originated in the UK, where it was broadcast on Channel 4 late at night on Fridays. From 18 April to 23 May 2006, the United States music network Fuse aired full length half-hour episodes as opposed to the 2-4 minute ones in the UK. Those half-hour episodes were later broadcast on Channel 4 from 27 October 2007 to 1 December 2007.

== Plot ==
Empire Square is about three foul-mouthed kids named Ritchie, Rabbit and Hooks. They are usually after "get-rich" schemes and get into a lot of trouble with crack whores, pedophiles, and many other crazy characters. In various episodes, they start bands. Empire Square is an apartment building in London where, they all live in the same room. Episode plots in the US vary from Richie and Rabbit's quest for pornography and computer systems to internet dating sites gone horribly wrong. Celebrity parodies also abound, such as Richie's trip to rehab (Courtney Love most notably), "the sweat shop", and Clay Aiken.

== Characters ==
- Ritchie is the main focus of the show. He has purple hair and dwarfism. On various occasions, it is thought that he can sing well. He has a temper and is very foul.
- Hooks is a streetwise girl always looking for a career. She has the most common sense of the three and would have a real life if it weren't for the other two.
- Rabbit is computer literate and wears a rabbit head. His morals are questionable and are still being developed with Hooks' help. He usually goes along with Ritchie's plans.
