= Russell Brand's Got Issues =

British TV debate comedy show

- Starring: Russell Brand
- Opening theme: "Deadwood"
- Composer: Dirty Pretty Things
- Country of origin: United Kingdom
- Original language: English
- No. of series: 1
- No. of episodes: 6

Production
- Running time: 30 minutes

Original release
- Network: E4
- Release: 12 September – 17 October 2006

Russell Brand's Got Issues is a British TV debate comedy show hosted by Russell Brand and shown on E4. The show was written by Brand and his longtime collaborator Matt Morgan. Superficially a studio debate, as each episode progressed the subject was often digressed from heavily.

The format of the show changed somewhat after the first couple of episodes with the character of "General Zod's nephew" Andrew Zod being dropped, and the clips of people being interviewed on the street becoming clips of Brand trying out a given activity and acting in a skit in relation to that week's topic.

The viewing figures for the first episode were seen as disappointing, being beaten by nearly all of E4's main multi-channel rivals, despite a big publicity and promotional campaign for the show. Because of the poor ratings the show was repackaged as The Russell Brand Show and moved to Channel 4.

== Episodes ==
No.	Title	Guest(s)	Original release date
1	"Is Our Obsession With Beauty Making Us Ugly?"	Lily Allen	12 September 2006
2	"Yobs: Is It Time to Fight Back?"	Laurence Llewelyn-Bowen and Michael Carroll	19 September 2006
3	"Is Sex Fucking Us Up?"	Jonathan Ross	26 September 2006
4	"The Paranormal"	Vanessa Feltz and Tim Westwood	3 October 2006
5	"The Nature of Celebrity"	Alan Cumming	10 October 2006
6	"Does True Love Exist?"	Jessica Stevenson	17 October 2006
