= My Booky Wook =

Memoir by Russell Brand

- Cover of the hardback edition
- Author: Russell Brand
- Illustrator: Nic Jensen
- Language: English
- Genre: Memoir
- Publisher: Hodder & Stoughton
- Publication date: 15 November 2007 (hardback); 10 July 2008 (paperback)
- Publication place: United Kingdom
- Media type: Print (hardcover, paperback)
- Pages: 353
- ISBN: 978-0-340-93615-3 (hardcover); ISBN 978-0-340-93617-7 (paperback)
- OCLC: 302057286
- Followed by: Booky Wook 2: This Time It's Personal

My Booky Wook is a memoir written by English comedian and actor Russell Brand, published in 2007 by Hodder & Stoughton. It was released in North America and Australia in 2009 by HarperCollins Publishers.

In 2026, the book was withdrawn from print following Brand’s conviction for rape and sexual assault.

== Summary ==
This warts-and-all account of Brand's life follows, in vivid detail, the star's life from his troubled childhood in Grays End Close, Grays, Essex, to his first taste for fame in stage school up to his turbulent drug addiction and his triumphant rise to fame from Re:Brand to Big Brother's Big Mouth to Hollywood. It includes stories of his predatory behaviour towards women and his animal abuse.

== Chapters ==
My Booky Wook is divided into four sections. Brand has claimed the title is an attempt to replicate the style of the fictional Nadsat language from A Clockwork Orange: Brand explained the reference during his appearance on Have I Got News For You in December 2007.

== Critical reception ==
The book garnered mostly positive reviews. The Sun called it "candid, funny and moving". The Observer claimed it was "better written and more entertaining than any number of the celebrity autobiographies that clog the shelves of bookshops". However, some reviews were less complimentary: Private Eye magazine called it "dismal and masturbatory". The book won the Biography of the Year at the 2008 British Book Awards and the Outstanding Literary Achievement at the 2009 Spike Guys' Choice Awards.

== Origins of book title ==
The book's title was first mentioned on 24 September 2006, during an episode of Brand's former radio show, The Russell Brand Show.

== Film adaptation ==
Brand planned to star as himself in a film adaptation of the book, originally scheduled to be filmed by British director Michael Winterbottom at the end of 2008 or early in 2009. The project was subsequently shelved by Brand, who did not want American audiences to learn of his "chequered past" without reading the book first.

== Sales ==
As of 2008, the book had sold more than 600,000 copies since it was released.
