= Russell Brand's Ponderland =

- Titlecard for the second series
- Presented by: Russell Brand
- Country of origin: United Kingdom
- Original language: English
- No. of series: 2
- No. of episodes: 12

Production
- Running time: 30 minutes

Original release
- Network: Channel 4
- Release: 22 October 2007 – 21 December 2008

Russell Brand's Ponderland is a British television comedy series which was broadcast on the TV station Channel 4, presented by comedian and actor Russell Brand. The show consists largely of Brand giving a series of monologues in a stand-up style, interspersed with old television and video footage.

== Series overview ==
Series	Episodes	Originally released	
Series	Episodes	First released	Last released
1	6	22 October 2007	27 October 2007
2	5	30 October 2008	27 November 2008
Christmas Special		21 December 2008	

== Episodes ==
=== Series 1 (2007) ===
- Childhood (22 October 2007)
- Science (23 October 2007)
- Crime (24 October 2007)
- Sport (25 October 2007)
- Love (26 October 2007)
- Holidays (27 October 2007)

=== Series 2 (2008) ===
- Pets (30 October 2008)
- Family (6 November 2008)
- Education (13 November 2008)
- Food (20 November 2008)
- Class (27 November 2008)

=== Christmas Special (2008) ===
- Christmas (21 December 2008)

== Awards ==
Year	Ceremony	Nominated for	Winning Programme
2008	British Academy Television Awards	Best comedy programme	Fonejacker

== DVD release ==
The first series of Ponderland was released on 10 November 2008 and includes footage of Brand from his youth and over 40 minutes of unseen stand up.

Season one of Ponderland is also part of the three disc set The Russell Brand Collection: Ménage A Trois which was released on 24 November 2008.
