= Booky Wook 2 =

2010 memoir by Russell Brand

Booky Wook 2: This Time It's Personal
- Author: Russell Brand
- Cover artist: Shepard Fairey
- Language: English
- Genre: Memoir
- Publisher: HarperCollins
- Publication date: 30 September 2010 (hardback)
- Publication place: United Kingdom
- Media type: Print (hardcover)
- Pages: 311
- ISBN: 978-0-00-729882-2 (hardcover)
- OCLC: 302057286
- Preceded by: My Booky Wook

Booky Wook 2: This Time It's Personal is the second memoir, written by English comedian and actor Russell Brand. It was published in September 2010 by HarperCollins.

Following Brand's conviction of rape and sexual assault in November 2026, HarperCollins withdrew the title from sale.

== Reception ==
A critic from Entertainment Weekly gave the book an A minus, saying fans of Brand's first book will also like the sequel.
