= List of Citizen Khan episodes =

The following is an episode list for the BBC One sitcom Citizen Khan. The show was first broadcast in the United Kingdom on BBC One on 27 August 2012.

== Episodes ==
Series	Episodes	Originally released	
Series	Episodes	First released	Last released
1	6	27 August 2012	1 October 2012
2	6	4 October 2013	20 November 2013
Special		20 December 2013	
3	6	31 October 2014	19 December 2014
Special		19 December 2014	
4	6	30 October 2015	18 December 2015
Special		18 December 2015	
5	6	4 November 2016	23 December 2016
Special		23 December 2016	

=== Series 1 (2012) ===
No.	Title	Directed by	Written by	Original release date
1	"Wedding Venue"	Nick Wood	Anil Gupta and Richard Pinto with Adil Ray	27 August 2012
Plans are being made for Shazia's forthcoming wedding to fiancé Amjad. Mrs Khan's on the warpath because Mr Khan's forgotten to book the wedding venue, but it shouldn't be a problem as long as he can persuade mosque manager Dave to do him a favour. The mosque is given when Mr Khan takes Mrs Bilal to a theme park with her friends.
2	"Naani's Shopping Trip"	Nick Wood	Anil Gupta and Richard Pinto with Adil Ray	3 September 2012
Mrs Khan's mother is staying with the family. But Mr Khan's big opportunity to hobnob with the bigwigs of the Sparkhill Business Association is threatened when he has to take his mother-in-law on a shopping trip she will never forget. Note: First appearance of Adlyn Ross as Nanni
3	"Family Holiday"	Nick Wood	Anil Gupta and Richard Pinto with Adil Ray	10 September 2012
Mr Khan is reluctant to dip into the rainy day fund to finance a holiday, but an eventful Annual General Meeting at the mosque seems to provide a solution.
4	"Amjad's Promotion"	Nick Wood	Anil Gupta and Richard Pinto with Adil Ray	17 September 2012
Mr Khan is determined to be the impresario behind the new call to prayer at the Sparkhill mosque, and sets out to hold his own The X Factor-style auditions. Meanwhile, son-in-law Amjad's promotion at his job hangs in the balance.
5	"The Cricket Match"	Nick Wood	Anil Gupta and Richard Pinto with Adil Ray	24 September 2012
Mr and Mrs Khan find themselves at loggerheads when she requires calm for a prayer meeting and he hopes to invite some friends over to watch a cricket match on their new TV.
6	"The Khans' Anniversary"	Nick Wood	Anil Gupta and Richard Pinto with Adil Ray	1 October 2012
The Khans have a spare invite for the wedding. For Mr Khan the fewer the guests the better, which is why he believes in inviting only influential people like Councillor Javed. So when Mrs Khan suggests inviting the Parvez family, Mr Khan is faced with an important decision. To add to his concerns, it also happens to be the Khans' wedding anniversary. Note: Last appearance of Kris Marshall as Dave

=== Series 2 (2013) ===
A second series of 6 episodes was recorded at the MediaCityUK in Salford, Greater Manchester, from 6 June to 18 July 2013, and broadcast from 1 October to 8 November.

No.	Title	Directed by	Written by	Original release date
7	"Alia's College"	Ben Gosling Fuller	Anil Gupta and Richard Pinto with Adil Ray	4 October 2013
Mr Khan's day off from being a 'busy' community leader is interrupted when Alia fails her exams, prompting Mrs Khan to lay down the law. She tells Mr Khan to sign Alia up at the Muslim Academy, but when he finds out how much it costs, Khan decides there's a better option. Meanwhile, Shazia has her friends Matt and Debbie from work.
8	"Naani's Day Out"	Ben Gosling Fuller	Anil Gupta and Richard Pinto with Adil Ray	11 October 2013
Mr Khan is off to meet the new mosque manager, whom he expects will finally get him onto the mosque committee. Naani, Mr Khan's mother-in-law, is visiting from Pakistan. Mrs Khan is worried because she has been doing nothing except stare into space all day. Note: First appearance of Matthew Cottle as Dave
9	"Amjad's Health Check"	Ben Gosling Fuller	Anil Gupta and Richard Pinto with Adil Ray	18 October 2013
Mr Khan wants to go to the mosque to meet the local MP, who is visiting to endorse the mosque's mobile men's health check unit. Khan needs to take a guinea pig, and future son-in-law Amjad fits the bill perfectly.
10	"Fasting"	Ben Gosling Fuller	Anil Gupta and Richard Pinto with Adil Ray	25 October 2013
The Imam calls a special fast. Shazia gets offers a job in India for a year, Mr Khan must get a loan. Meanwhile, Alia has an exchange student staying.
11	"Shazia's Gym Visit"	Ben Gosling Fuller	Anil Gupta and Richard Pinto with Adil Ray	1 November 2013
Shazia and Amjad have managed to get a trial day at an exclusive gym, but Mr Khan is more interested in contacting a famous Pakistani cricketer.
12	"The Makeover"	Ben Gosling Fuller	Anil Gupta and Richard Pinto with Adil Ray	8 November 2013
Mrs Khan is having a makeover and Mr Khan wants the starring role in the mosque video that Dave is making.

=== Christmas Special (2013) ===
No.	Title	Directed by	Written by	Original release date
13	"A Khan Christmas"	Ben Gosling Fuller	Anil Gupta and Richard Pinto with Adil Ray	20 December 2013
On Christmas Eve, Mrs Khan has decided to have a traditional family Christmas, their first one ever. Mr Khan is not supportive; he thinks Christmas is just an excuse for people to get ripped off and he believes the Khans have the perfect reason not to celebrate it as they are Muslims. Last appearance of Felix Dexter as Omar due to Dexter's death in October 2013

=== Series 3 (2014) ===
The third series of Citizen Khan will comprise six episodes, with recordings taking place at Media City Studios in Manchester from 10 August 2014 until 1 October 2014. The third series began on BBC One on Friday 31 October 2014 at 8:30pm.

No.	Title	Directed by	Written by	Original release date
14	"Naani's Return"	Tom Poole	Anil Gupta and Richard Pinto with Adil Ray	31 October 2014
After the family arrives back from a trip to Pakistan, Mr Khan's mother-in-law announces she wants to move into a home. When Sam - the head of a local care centre - arrives, Mr Khan is over-the-moon. That is, until he discovers the mother-in-law may be worth some money. With the help of son-in-law-to-be Amjad, a ridiculous disguise and a spying mission, Mr Khan tries to stop Naani moving out at all costs.
15	"The In-Laws"	Tom Poole	Anil Gupta and Richard Pinto with Adil Ray	7 November 2014
With the wedding being planned, Mr and Mrs Khan invite the Maliks to the house for a dinner party. Mr Khan sees Mr Malik as his fast track onto a local business committee. The Khans pull out all the stops to impress their guests, while Alia is given permission to go to a birthday party after Mr Khan learns that it is at the house of the head of the local business committee. But when Mr Khan receives an unexpected phone call from the police, any future the two families have together sits on a knife edge. Note:First Series 3 appearance of Harvey Virdi as Mrs Malik.
16	"Aunty Noor"	Tom Poole	Anil Gupta and Richard Pinto with Adil Ray	21 November 2014 (Note: This episode aired two weeks after episode 2 due to Children in Need on 14 November.)
In his new role as househusband, Mr Khan introduces strict new house rules, and sends his younger daughter Alia to a London Mosque for work experience. Never one to miss out on a bargain, he then abuses Mrs Khan’s staff discount card at the supermarket to become the local ‘nappy dealer’. When Alia returns from London with Mrs Khan’s domineering sister, Aunty Noor (Nina Wadia), Noor threatens to reveal his scam. But Mr Khan has other ideas and takes drastic action to avoid the wrath of Mrs Khan.
17	"Farmer Khan"	Tom Poole	Anil Gupta and Richard Pinto with Adil Ray	28 November 2014
When Mrs Khan announces she's running a stall at the local city farm to promote the supermarket's new organic range, Mr Khan couldn't be any less interested. Everyone who's anyone has been invited to a Prince Charles royal reception in Birmingham, but he hasn't had an invitation. He sees a chance to get his invite directly when he hears HRH might be dropping in to the city farm. Unfortunately he has to impress the head of the welcoming committee, Marina Fairchild, first. In customary Khan style, he decides to bend the truth in order to win Marina round. Everything goes swimmingly until his lies catch up with him and life on the farm becomes quite a handful. First Series 3 appearance of Nish Nathwani as Riaz and Matthew Cottle as Dave
18	"Stags and Hens"	Tom Poole	Anil Gupta and Richard Pinto with Adil Ray	5 December 2014
It is the day of Shazia's hen do, and she is looking forward to having some fun with her friends. Unfortunately, though, she ends up with a few extra guests in tow. Mr Khan reluctantly agrees to organise Amjad's stag do, which inadvertently involves an Imam returning from missionary work. While Shazia finds herself bombarded by everyone's stories of the horrors of married life, back at the house, Amjad is put in a compromising position. And when the two parties collide, the wedding is left hanging in the balance.
19	"The Wedding"	Tom Poole	Anil Gupta and Richard Pinto with Adil Ray	12 December 2014
The day of Shazia's wedding to Amjad finally dawns, but it doesn't get off to a great start when Mrs Khan falls out with her daughter and refuses to attend the ceremony. This leaves Mr Khan to sort out the mess - but in his none-too-subtle attempt to get his wife back on side, he only manages to make matters worse - then the groom goes missing and Mrs Malik makes a startling revelation.

=== Christmas Special (2014) ===
No.	Title	Directed by	Written by	Original release date
20	"A Khan Family Christmas"	Tom Poole	Anil Gupta and Richard Pinto with Adil Ray	19 December 2014
It's Christmas Eve, 10 months after Shazia and Amjad's wedding, and Mr Khan is in a festive mood for once. He's even bought himself a new suit. Could it have something to do with the fact that he has been given the honour of placing the star on top of the Sparkhill inter-faith Christmas tree? There's great excitement as the entire family gathers at the Khan house before heading out to the ceremony. But then it turns out Shazia has alternative plans. Shazia then gives birth to a baby boy named Mohammed. Mohammed is born the same day Christians believe Jesus was born on. Note: Last Appearance of Maya Sondhi as Shazia

=== Series 4 (2015) ===
No.	Title	Directed by	Written by	Original release date
21	"Farley Manor"	Nick Wood	Anil Gupta and Richard Pinto with Adil Ray	30 October 2015
The Khans decide to have a family day out to visit Farley Manor, owned by Lord Anstruther, which is putting on a display of Indian treasures collected during the British Raj. Meanwhile, Mr Khan's efforts to impress the council committee are put on hold while he babysits Naani round the old manor. He becomes much keener on all things ancient and Indian after meeting Lord Anstruther, but his hopes of hob-nobbing with the aristocracy are jeopardised by Naani's sticky fingers. First Appearance: Krupa Pattani as Shazia Guest Star: Peter Bowles as Lord Anstruther
22	"Family Photo"	Nick Wood	Anil Gupta and Richard Pinto with Adil Ray	6 November 2015
Mr Khan wants to enrol baby Mohammad at a good school and tries to take the inside track by becoming a school crossing patrol officer. But the training regime and selection process is tougher than he was expecting, even with Amjad helping him to get fit on the streets of Birmingham. Meanwhile, Naani wants the family to have a proper family photo done in a studio. Shazia and Alia clash when Alia tries to hijack the studio session to get photos for her personal fashion vlog (which already has thousands of followers - most of them drawn to a video of Mr Khan walking to the bathroom in his underpants). Note: First series 4 appearances of Shobu Kapoor as Mrs Khan, Matthew Cottle as Dave and Nish Nathwani as Riaz Note: First appearance of Hussain Akhtar as Baby Mohammed
23	"Local Hero"	Nick Wood	Anil Gupta, David Isaac and Richard Pinto with Adil Ray	20 November 2015 (Note: This episode aired two weeks after episode 2 due to Children in Need on 13 November.) (Note: This episode aired at 7.30pm due to Adele at the BBC.)
Baby Mohammad is having a few unsettled nights, and Shazia and Amjad are finding it difficult to cope with the lack of sleep. Mrs Khan thinks they need to spend some quality time together. Meanwhile, Mr Khan tries to win a Pride of Birmingham award, which leads to an altercation with a parking attendant at the supermarket.
24	"Chicken Shop"	Nick Wood	Anil Gupta, David Isaac and Richard Pinto with Adil Ray	27 November 2015
Mrs Khan decides she and Mr Khan should have more 'together' time, and invites Khan along to watch her tango class demonstration. Mr Khan already has something planned - he's opening a fried chicken franchise on the High Street. He's keeping it a secret from Mrs Khan as he's invested their pension money in it. He enrols, Alia, Amjad, Naani and nephew Faraz as his chicken shop crack team. Matters are further complicated when the manageress at the chicken shop, Sandra takes a shine to Amjad. But for Mr Khan this could be just what he needs... Guest Star: Ronni Ancona as Sandra
25	"Mystic Mo"	Nick Wood	Anil Gupta and Richard Pinto with Adil Ray	4 December 2015
While trying to teach Baby Mo how to play cricket Mr Khan discovers that his little grandson might be psychic, and immediately sets him to work picking his lottery numbers. Amjad's mother, Mrs Malik, is threatening to solve Shazia and Amjad's housing problems by taking them with her to live in Bradford. Mrs Khan succumbs to stomach pains as a result of the stress, and the family rush her to hospital. On her hospital gurney, while waiting to see a doctor (whom she tries to set up with Alia), Mrs Khan makes her husband promise to stop Shazia, Amjad and Baby Mo going to live with the in-laws. Khan has to use his ingenuity, and a DNA testing kit, to try and save the day - not before electrocuting himself on a defibrillator and getting involved in one mo' mix up... Note: First Series 4 appearance of Harvey Virdi as Mrs Malik
26	"Alia's Boyfriend"	Karl Rooney	Anil Gupta and Richard Pinto with Adil Ray	11 December 2015
In line with the great tradition of British Muslim baking, Mr Khan enters the Great Sparkhill Bake Off. He's making his own version of the Lemon Drizzle Inside Out cake. Meanwhile, there are more pressing problems on the domestic front: Alia's got a boyfriend called Scab. Mrs Khan is worried that he sounds too rough and sends Mr Khan (and son-in-law Amjad) to give him a talking to - at a pub. After negotiating a number of bearded biker men, Khan meets the boyfriend and for purely selfish reasons invites him over to the house. However Mrs Khan makes a discovery that forces Mr Khan to quiz Alia about every father's worst nightmare... Guest Star: Tyger Drew-Honey as Scab (Richard)

=== Christmas Special (2015) ===
No.	Title	Directed by	Written by	Original release date
27	"Mr Khan's Christmas Wonderland"	Nick Wood	Anil Gupta and Richard Pinto with Adil Ray	18 December 2015
Mr Khan embraces Christmas like never before by launching his own range of traditional halal mince pies with the help of a local business dragon. Shazia and Amjad try to find somewhere else to live, because their landlord is selling their house and they can't afford the deposit to buy it. Naani has a solution - she's going to give them the money for the deposit. Her only mistake is entrusting it to Mr Khan, who promptly loses it. To retrieve it, he heads to the Community Centre's Winter Wonderland, where Dave's putting on a show about a talking snowman that may or may not be able to fly. Mr Khan finds himself re-creating an iconic festive scene. The story ends with a tearjerker as Mr Khan suffers a very personal loss.

=== Series 5 (2016) ===
No.	Title	Directed by	Written by	Original release date
28	"Cricket"	Nick Wood	Anil Gupta, Richard Pinto, James Carey and Adil Ray	4 November 2016
Having been made to sleep in the car by Mrs Khan after forgetting their wedding anniversary, Mr Khan is on a mission to make amends. But his boast to Dave that he knows local boy Moeen Ali backfires when Amjad suggests he could get the famous England all-rounder to make a celebrity appearance at the fundraiser that Mrs Khan and Shazia are helping organise. Mr Khan has no option but to get to the cricket match to find Moeen and do whatever it takes. First Appearance: Zainab Akhtar as Nadiya Malik Guest Star: Sadiq Khan as himself, Jonathan Agnew as himself and Michael Vaughan as himself
29	"Bullies"	Nick Wood	Anil Gupta, Richard Pinto, James Carey and Adil Ray	11 November 2016
Mr Khan buys a drone camera to keep an eye on the local neighbourhood and finds out that his grandson Mo is being bullied at nursery. However, when he decides to take Amjad in hand and teach him how to be a better dad, he gets a lot more than he bargained for during a trip to the local pool and later when re-enacting a scene from gangster drama Peaky Blinders. Meanwhile, Shazia and Amjad are getting ready to go on their first family holiday together, except Mrs Khan thinks she's going along too. Guest Star: Laura Aikman as Debbie and Ricky Grover as Doug
30	"Funeral"	Nick Wood	Anil Gupta, Richard Pinto, James Carey and Adil Ray	25 November 2016 (Note: This episode aired two weeks after episode 2 due to Children in Need on 18 November.)
Tragedy strikes the Khan household, as Amjad's bewigged father, Mr Malik, is knocked down and killed by the number 37 bus. The real tragedy for Mr Khan is that the grief-stricken Mrs Malik is staying with them and comfort eating him out of house and home. But when Mr Khan discovers he might be able to find an investor for his new invention amongst the funeral mourners, he throws himself into the burial arrangements.
31	"Scab's Parents"	Nick Wood	Anil Gupta, Richard Pinto and Adil Ray	2 December 2016
Mr Khan has been spending quality time with Alia's 'friend who is a boy' Scab. They are getting on famously and, after a one-to-one chat with Alia, Mr Khan suspects it won't be long before there is another Khan family wedding on the horizon. But then Scab takes fright at the prospect of the Khans meeting his parents. The Khans believe it is because they are a bit snooty and object to the idea of having a Pakistani daughter-in-law. So Mr Khan and Amjad hotfoot it to the posh country club to confront Scab's father in a sweaty sauna and give him a piece of their minds. Guest Star: Harry Enfield as Scab's father
32	"Alia's University"	Nick Wood	Anil Gupta, Richard Pinto and Adil Ray	9 December 2016
Mr Khan has to drop his daughter Alia off for her first day at university - in Scotland. Mrs Khan wants the whole family to come, so Mr Khan has to find a way to get all of them from Sparkhill to Glasgow. When the car breaks down, he is forced to improvise alternative travel arrangements, which gives them all plenty of time to reminisce about Alia's early years.
33	"Mr. Khan's Niece"	Karl Rooney	Anil Gupta, Richard Pinto and Adil Ray	16 December 2016
Mr Khan and Mosque manager Dave organise rival Muslim Days at the community centre. Mr Khan is convinced his fun day with a bouncy Mosque and 'pin the beard on the Imam' stall will be far more popular than Dave's Women in Islam event. But he forgets that he'd agreed to look after his wayward niece Shabana. Mr Khan is forced to take the stroppy teenager to Muslim Day with him and, to top it all off, Dave has managed to invite Baroness Sayeeda Warsi, whom Khan is desperate to impress.

=== Christmas Special (2016) ===
No.	Title	Directed by	Written by	Original release date
34	"It's A Khanderful Life"	Karl Rooney	Anil Gupta, Richard Pinto, James Carey and Adil Ray	23 December 2016
Mr. Khan tips his hat to Frank Capra’s Christmas classic It’s A Wonderful Life, with Sparkhill taking the place of Bedford Falls and Mr. Khan, like George Bailey, facing up to the fact that his life hasn’t turned out the way he planned it. But an encounter with a mysterious heavenly passer-by shows him how things might have been different and convinces him that, despite all its frustrations, his is a “Khanderful Life” after all. Mr Khan narrates as we go back in time to the Khan's early years. Guest Star: Lynda Baron
