= Ben Dover =

English pornographic actor, director and producer

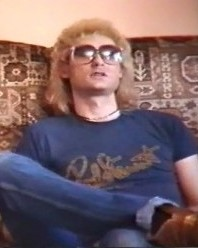
- Dover in the early 1980s
- Born: Simon James Honey; 23 May 1956 (age 70); Sittingbourne, Kent, England
- Other names: Steve Perry; Lindsay Honey
- Occupations: Actor; director; producer
- Years active: 1978–present
- Partner: Linzi Drew (1980s–2011)
- Children: Tyger Drew-Honey

Simon James Honey (born 23 May 1956), better known as Ben Dover, is an English pornographic actor, director and producer. He has also worked under several other pseudonyms including Steve Perry as producer and Lindsay Honey as an actor and musician.

Honey was included in Larry Flynt's Hustler's Top 50 Most Hated People in Porn list, printed in the January 1999 issue and in 2011, he was inducted into the AVN Hall of Fame.

Honey has also won a host of awards for the Ben Dover series including the Breakthrough Award at the AVN Awards in 1997, AVN's Best Gonzo Award twice (in 2000 for Ben Dover's End Games and in 2002 for Ben Dover's The Booty Bandit). In 2006, he was awarded the Lifetime Achievement Award at the UK Adult Film Awards, which he co-presented with Kristyn Halborg, Kelly Stafford and co-star Pascal White.

In 2012, Honey was nominated by the Internet Service Providers Association as an Internet Villain for his involvement with his company Golden Eye (International) in speculative invoicing.

== Biography ==
=== Early days in the music industry ===
Born in Sittingbourne, Kent to Sylvia (née Foster) (1926–2017) and Frank Cyril Honey (1921–1993), Honey attended Borden Grammar School. Following expulsion from school in 1973, he moved to Newquay, Cornwall where he worked as a children's entertainer called "Uncle Simon" and drummed in a cabaret band for the summer season.

Using the pseudonym Lindsay Honey (as he "didn't think Simon fitted the bill somehow"), he began working as a session drummer for artists such as Edison Lighthouse and White Plains. Honey joined Artful Dodgers who released one single "Here We Go" in 1978 before changing their name to 20th Century Heroes.

Following a chance meeting in a taxi between the band's guitarist, Paul Jackson, and one-time Bay City Rollers bassist Ian Mitchell (who replaced original member Alan Longmuir in 1976, before quitting after seven months), the band (Jackson, Honey and bassist John Jay) agreed to be Mitchell's backing band. The Ian Mitchell Band was launched in May 1979. Although the band were not successful in the UK, they released three studio albums within a single year and toured across Europe and Japan. Following the departure of Jackson, the band changed their name to La Rox and reinvented themselves as a glam rock band, with Honey becoming the band's keyboard player. The change made little impact on the band's fortunes in the UK, and they split up in 1982. Honey, along with the band's second drummer John Towe and guitarist Lea Hart (who had replaced Paul Jackson) scored a minor UK hit, under the name Small Ads, with the one-off single "Small Ads", released in April 1981.

Honey also worked as a cabaret singer under the pseudonym "Steve Jackson" and briefly reunited with Mitchell to form "Bachelor Of Hearts" who released one album in 1983 to little fanfare (a version of the track "Girls in Jeans" was later used as the outro music on Ben Dover films).

=== Early adult film work ===
In 1978, Honey broke from his dwindling career as a musician and working as a male stripper using the stage name "Hot Rod" (due to his reported likeness to Rod Stewart at the time), Honey responded to an advertisement for models in The Stage newspaper and met agent Kent William Boulton (1941–2002). Boulton was a college lecturer from Bromley and former Labour Party candidate on the Isle of Wight, who entered the porn business late in life and was renowned for organising "spanking parties".

Being paid £150 a shoot, Honey started working for Berth Milton Sr, publisher of Private Magazine and other European hardcore porn magazines such as Rodox/Color Climax, a Danish company. His first shoot was with a then 17-year-old Eileen Daly, who had gone to see the same agent above a strip club in Soho with her mother. Honey was introduced by Boulton to the photographer Lexington Steel and director Mike Freeman.

==== Working for Videx Ltd. ====
Honey began working as an actor for Mike Freeman's Videx Ltd. in 1980, a video production company based in Wimbledon. Freeman had produced softcore porn throughout the 1960s via his company Climax Films, and employed well known Soho gangster Gerald Patrick Joseph Hawley as a bodyguard. He was jailed in December 1969 for the murder of Hawley, reportedly after he tried to take over Freeman's business.

Upon release from prison in 1979, Freeman set about exploiting the Obscene Publications Act, which didn't yet cover the new video format, and started producing hardcore pornography. While working at Videx, Honey starred in his first film as an actor in "Truth or Dare" with actress Paula Meadows. However, the law was soon changed to bring video under the Obscene Publications Act and Freeman's home was raided in 1981 by the OPS (Obscene Publications Squad), with all the Videx video equipment confiscated in the process. The Videx offices were raided again in 1983 and Freeman was arrested in relation to the film "The Videx Video Show" under Obscene Publications Act and Perverting the course of justice.

Freeman was sentenced to 15 months in the case relating to the first raid in 1981 involving the video "Sex Slave". Honey took over Videx and produced and directed his first film, "Rock 'n' Roll Ransom", for the company which featured his bandmate Ian Mitchell. After serving ten months Freeman was released from prison and set about preparing for the case of the second raid in relation to the video "The Videx Video Show". Freeman was charged under The Obscene Publications Act and Protection of Children Act, as images of children taken at a naturist park were featured (although in a separate scene to any pornographic content). Having called film critic Derek Malcolm as a witness who classed the film as "harmless erotica" and successfully demonstrating that the film was not obscene, Freeman, Honey, Freeman's girlfriend and company secretary Sara Bhaskaran, and silent business partner John Edward Currey were found not guilty under the Obscene Publications Act. However, Freeman was found guilty of perverting the course of justice, despite having already been acquitted of the offence relating to the video, and sentenced to a further 15 months. He was then recalled by the Parole Board for his previous life sentence for murder.

==== Going it alone and imprisonment ====
Honey worked as a photographer, under the pseudonym "Brian Wilson" (after the musician), for Escort magazine throughout the 1980s, shooting his partner Linzi Drew who regularly appeared in the magazine. The couple also took the Videx equipment (which Freeman had purchased to replace the original confiscated equipment) and mailing list to set up their own mail order business. Operating from their home, Corner Cottage in Stoke d'Abernon, Surrey, they sold hardcore pornographic films under various names such as Stephanie Perry and Glamour Pussy Video Club via adverts in magazines. The couple also used other addresses across Surrey, including that of a pet shop, where order forms would be collected.

The couple were arrested in February 1990 following a police raid on their home and convicted in 1992 at Guildford Crown Court under the Obscene Publications Act for "publishing obscene material for gain" and "being in possession of obscene material" following a sting operation in which an undercover police officer joined the companies' mailing list and over a period of more than a year bought several videos, which also proved that the operation was "an on-going tax-free profitable business".

Drew was sentenced to four months, which she served at Holloway Prison and Drake Hall, Staffordshire, before being released after serving two months, while Honey was sentenced to nine months, which he served at Brixton Prison before being transferred after five weeks to Send Open Prison, Surrey. Documents seized by the police indicated that they had 400 people on their mailing list who paid £60 per video.

In December 1993 Honey filed for bankruptcy. Following release from prison Honey and Bill Wright (a.k.a. Frank Thring) were commissioned to work on the first feature-length videos for Berth Milton, Sr.'s Private Media Group, which had only produced magazines before. Honey directed its first seven films with Wright and took on the new pseudonym Steve Perry (after the Journey frontman).

=== Ben Dover series ===
Honey started production of a new gonzo-style series in summer 1994 using the stage name Ben Dover (a name which was influenced by a title from John Stagliano's "Buttman" pornography video series "Bendover Babes"). He directed, produced and starred (as both cameraman/narrator and occasionally as performer) in the series between 1995 and 2002 along with actors including Marino Franchi and Pascal White. In 1995, Drew became pregnant with their son Tyger Drew-Honey and left the pornography industry.

Upon release in the United States, the Ben Dover films were edited by VCA Pictures to censor the more graphic contents of the original productions. In 2002 Honey was dropped by VCA, which had been taken over by Hustler, and opted to concentrate on the market in the UK instead. It wasn't until 2004 that he again attempted to obtain US distribution for his films and signed a deal with Kick Ass Pictures and resurrected the Ben Dover brand. He began producing the Ben Dover's Kick Ass Anal Adventures series, of which there were five instalments.

In 2008 Honey attended the UK Adult Film Awards once more, representing Television X and Red Hot TV along with Linsey Dawn Mckenzie and other British adult film stars. Television X has shown some of his most recent projects such as St/ Teenycums, which won Best Script at the UK Adult Film Awards 2008.

Following the demise of physical DVD sales, Honey diversified the Ben Dover brand by launching branded clothing, sex toys (including The Ben Dover Signature line, which produces, among other products, The Ben Dover Realistic Penis and The Ben Dover Anal Kit), male enhancers, mugs and stickers as well as Ben Dover approved stag and hen parties. Honey also hosts "Ben Dover Porn Disco"s involving wet t-shirt competitions and "SwingalongaBen" swinging parties in Aston, Birmingham.

Also in 2012, Honey started production on a new online Ben Dover series "Like Father Like Son," an incest-based series where he and his on-screen son have sex with the same girl together. He confirmed the series did not feature his own son.

=== Outside the porn industry ===
In addition to his pornographic work, in 2000 Honey featured in the feature film Last Resort (2000), in which he played a low-budget porn producer.

In 2001, despite admitting to having failed to vote in the previous election, Honey revealed that he was considering standing as an independent candidate in the next general election as an "Independent Libertarian". He would advocate the dismantling of the Royal Family, branding them an "outdated, irrelevant and frankly dangerous institution", removing any power from the church and reforming the National Health Service and would "make patients at A&E departments who are there as a result of pub fights etc, be made to pay a serious levy for the expense of treating them". In 2009 Honey resurrected his plans to enter politics, with his own party "New Democrats".

In September 2009, Honey was featured on the BBC Four programme Rich Man Poor Man: Ben Dover Straightens Up, where he attempted to search for personal fulfilment in his life and be taken seriously by making a break in mainstream acting. He performed his one-man show Innocent 'Til Proven Filthy at the 2009 Edinburgh Fringe Festival.

Honey appeared as Arthur in the comedy film On the Ropes.

In 2012 Honey joined the Guns N' Roses tribute band Guns 2 Roses as a special guest drummer, and continues to tour with them on select dates. He also released the mockumentary "The Only Way is Dover" on YouTube, claiming "It's a bit like Curb Your Enthusiasm. It's not about porn, it's about what we do when we're not doing porn."

In 2016 Honey was cast by film producer Mark Noyce as Rubber John in the comedy film The Blazing Cannons.

In February 2017, Honey revealed that he was battling bladder cancer and is currently undergoing chemotherapy.

=== Golden Eye – speculative invoicing ===
In 2008, Honey set up the shell company Golden Eye (International) Ltd with Julian Fraser Becker (commercial director of Optime Strategies Ltd, who trade as Ben Dover Productions) which claims to be the "holder of numerous film copyrights", primarily those of Ben Dover Productions films. The company was named after the house Honey shared with his partner Linzi Drew and son, Tyger Drew-Honey in Hersham, Surrey into which they moved in 2005 and left in 2011, after the couple split up and the house put up for sale and sold in November 2011.

In May 2009, Ben Dover Productions announced that it was retaining the services of the Anti Piracy Group to tackle the problem of DVD piracy. The company claimed their sales and profits had plummeted due to organised crime gangs flooding the streets with pirated DVDs of their titles.

The company then engaged in a campaign of "speculative invoicing", where they sent out letters, initially through lawyers, to alleged copyright infringers demanding a payment of £700 or face the threat of potential court action: a scheme described by the House of Lords as "straightforward legal blackmail" and a scam. The company paid for a list of alleged BitTorrent file-sharers identities, and retained the services of Tilly Bailey & Irvine to pursue the alleged copyright infringers for compensation, using what they claimed to be "bespoke technology which captures the irrefutable evidence of the perpetrators". It was revealed that this technology, investigated and checked by physicist and "checked computer expert" Clement Vogler of computer consultants Ad Litem Limited, a company which was dissolved in 2011, was targeting innocent individuals, and that the speculative invoicing relied on the embarrassment of those targeted agreeing to the fine to avoid the threatened court action, regardless of whether they were guilty or not. The data gatherer Alireza Torabi of NG3 Systems also gathered IP data for ACS:Law. Following adverse public and press reaction, Tilly Bailey & Irvine abandoned the practice and accepted a £2,800 fine from the Solicitors Regulation Authority. Without the aid of solicitors, Golden Eye (International) Limited continued the practice of speculatively invoicing those they claim had "infringed their copyrights".

In 2011, the company lost a court case against an internet user who they claimed had illegally downloaded the Ben Dover film "Fancy An Indian?", and were themselves accused of breaching the Copyright Designs and Patents Act 1988 and Civil Procedure Rules when issuing the claim. Timothy Dutton QC of the Solicitors Regulation Authority noted that as computer IP addresses can be shared, faked and hijacked, the evidence being used was of the "flimsiest" variety. Golden Eye attempted to get the case tried in a county court, but when it was confirmed it would need to be tried at the London Patents County Court the company tried to pull out of the case. Judge Birss QC highlighted similarities between this and a previous case involving Media CAT Limited and lawyers ACS:Law who unsuccessfully tried to sue 27 individuals for alleged copyright infringement, as Media CAT Limited were not the rights holders of the copyrighted material in question and led to ACS:Law ceasing to trade.

In order for the case to progress in the Patents County Court, the actual copyright holder, Optime Strategies Limited (who trade as Ben Dover Productions), would have to have joined Golden Eye (Julian Becker is a director of both companies) and "potentially put themselves at risk of becoming liable for a wasted costs claim if the case were to fail like ACS:Law's did". To avoid this, in January 2012, the company instead started pursuing individuals through the HM Courts & Tribunals Money Claim Online service for claims which should only be made through the Patents County Court.

On 9 March 2012, Golden Eye went to court in an attempt to obtain a Norwich Pharmacal Order (NPO) for the details of over 9,000 IP addresses from internet service provider O2 (UK)/Telefónica Europe (an internet provider who previously had not contested NPOs) to service further "speculative invoicing" letters to alleged copyright infringers. Golden Eye were questioned by statutory consumer organisation Consumer Focus regarding the company's ability (or lack of) to connect an IP address with the account holder, the company's role in relation to the copyrights involved and the amount being demanded, which they stated was "far and above the likely actual damages".

On 26 March 2012, the High Court ordered O2 to hand over the details of 9,124 of its customers’ details to Golden Eye. However, the judge deemed the proposed £700 fine to be "unsupported and unsupportable" and that the bill payer couldn't automatically be assumed to be guilty of any alleged copyright violation, and therefore any claim made by Golden Eye/Ben Dover Productions/Optime Strategies Ltd couldn't move forward unless the recipient of the company's speculative invoicing letters admitted their own guilt due to the evidence used being unreliable. The wording of any such letters would also be severely restricted, and the "precise wording of the order and of the letter of claim" would be decided at a further hearing. Consumer Focus welcomed the ruling that bill payers couldn't automatically be assumed to be guilty of any alleged copyright violation on their internet connection, commenting that "Consumers should not be subject to the type of threatening letters Golden Eye intended to send to more than 9,000 O2 customers". Golden Eye's lawyer admitted that taking a test case to court would not be cost effective, and therefore the company didn't intend on taking any cases to court and that they relied on those accused paying their "fine".

In July 2012, the High Court ruled that Golden Eye would only be granted access to data in relation to Ben Dover Production films, not the titles by twelve other production companies that Golden Eye were acting on behalf of (including Terry Stephen's One Eyed Jack Productions and Justin Ribeiro Dos Santos's Joybear Pictures) and would take 75% of any "damages" paid, which Mr Justice Arnold stated "would be tantamount to the court sanctioning the sale of the intended defendants’ privacy and data protection rights to the highest bidder". This meant that Golden Eye would only be able to target 2,845 of its original target of over 9,000 households. It was revealed in December 2012 that the IP data supplied to O2 (UK)/Telefónica Europe by Golden Eye, from 2,850 alleged copyright infringements of Ben Dover Production films could only be matched to less than 1,000 individuals.

In an interview with Vice, Honey claimed his income had dropped 90% in two years and admitted his reasons for his involvement in speculative invoicing was that "if I can't make money out of porn, the only way I can make money is to get to the people who are not buying it".

== Personal life ==
Honey was previously married to adult actress and model Linzi Drew. Their son is English actor, musician and television presenter Tyger Drew-Honey, best known for starring in the BBC sitcom Outnumbered. Honey also appeared in the first episode of his son's TV series Tyger Takes On..., which examined the influence of pornography on Drew-Honey's generation.

== Partial filmography ==
- Intimate Contact (1987) - Nick
- Ben Dover in London (1994)
- Ben Dover's Ben Behaving Badly (1996)
- Ben Dover's British Anal Invasion (1997)
- Ben Dover's London Calling (1998)
- Ben Dover's Spicy Girls (1999)
- Ben Dover's Porno Groupies (1999)
- Ben Dover's Cheek Mates (2000)
- Ben Dover's Sex Kittens from Britain (2000)
- Ben Dover's Posh Birds (2001)
- Ben Dover's Essex Girls (2002)
- Ben Dover's Soccer Sluts (2003)
- Ben Dover Does The Boob Cruise (2004)
- Ben Dover's The Girlie Show (2005)
- Ben Dover's Pussy Galore (2006)
- Ben Dover's Yummy Mummies (2009)
- Killer Bitch (2010)
- On the Ropes (2011)
- Down on Abby (2014)

== See also ==
- List of British pornographic actors
- Pornography in the United Kingdom
