= TBI =

TBI may refer to:

== Medicine ==
- Total body irradiation, radiation therapy
- Tracheobronchial injury (damage to the airways)
- Traumatic brain injury
- Triamcinolone benetonide, a glucocorticoid

== Other ==
- Tony Blair Institute for Global Change
- Temple Beth Israel (disambiguation)
- TBI plc, an airport owner and operator
- Tennessee Bureau of Investigation
- Trade Bank of Iraq, Baghdad
- TBI Bank, Sofia, Bulgaria
- Throttle body injection, in internal combustion engines
- TBI Solicitors, UK, a law firm
- Task-based instruction or task-based language teaching
