= Tyger Drew-Honey =

British actor (born 1996)

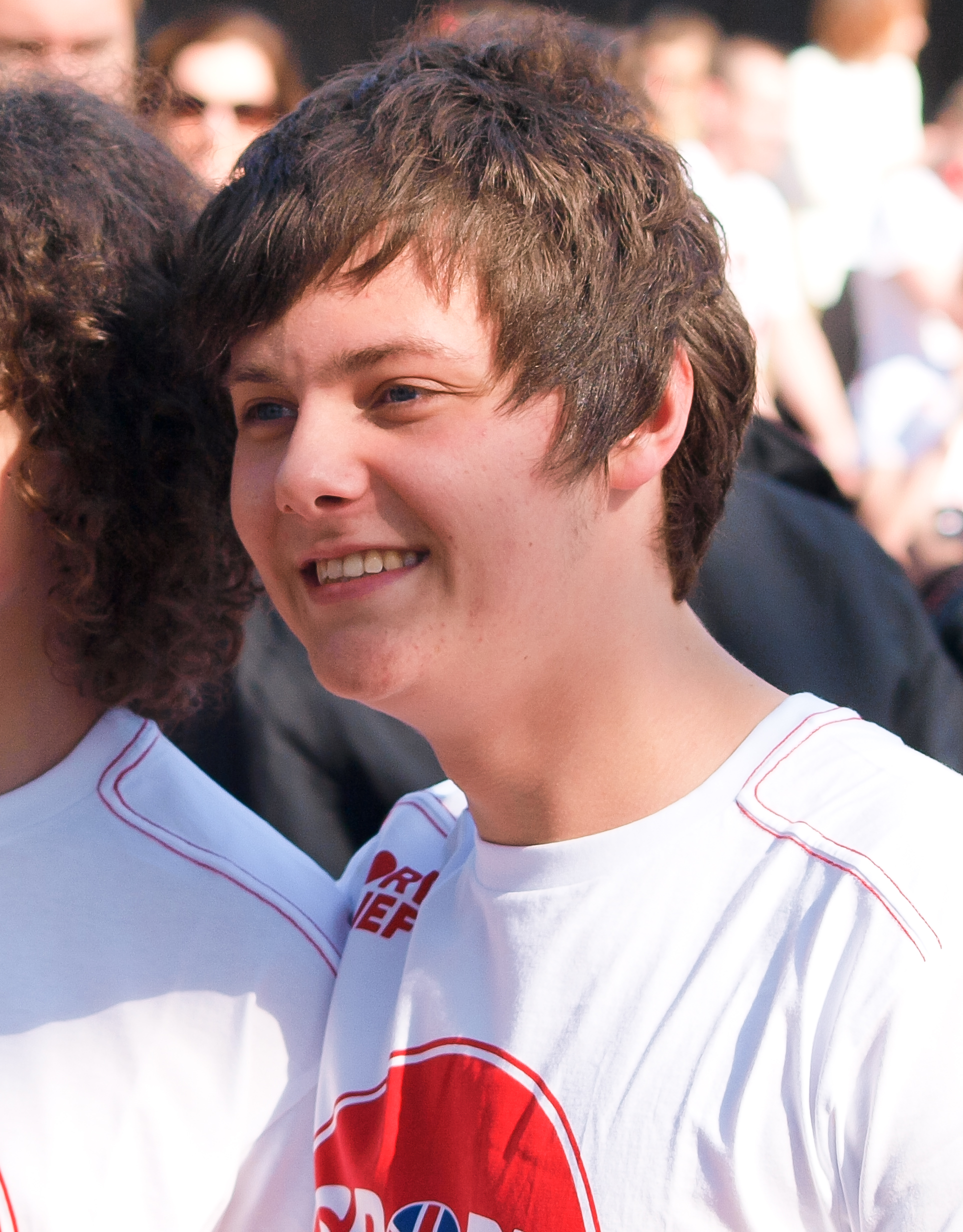
- Drew-Honey at Sport Relief 2012 in London
- Born: Lindzi James Tyger Drew-Honey; 26 January 1996 (age 30); Epsom, Surrey, England
- Occupations: Actor; television presenter
- Years active: 2006–present
- Spouse: Fluke Chotphuang (married 2025)
- Parents: Ben Dover (father); Linzi Drew (mother)
- Website: tygerdrew-honey.com

Lindzi James Tyger Drew-Honey (born 26 January 1996) is an English actor and television presenter. He is best known for his role as Jake Brockman in the British sitcom Outnumbered, in Citizen Khan as Richard Scab before later appearing in Horrid Henry: The Movie (2011) and the television series Cuckoo.

== Personal life ==
Tyger Drew-Honey is the son of actors Ben Dover and Linzi Drew. He was educated at Danes Hill School, Oxshott, in Surrey followed by Epsom College.

== Career ==
=== Acting and presenting ===
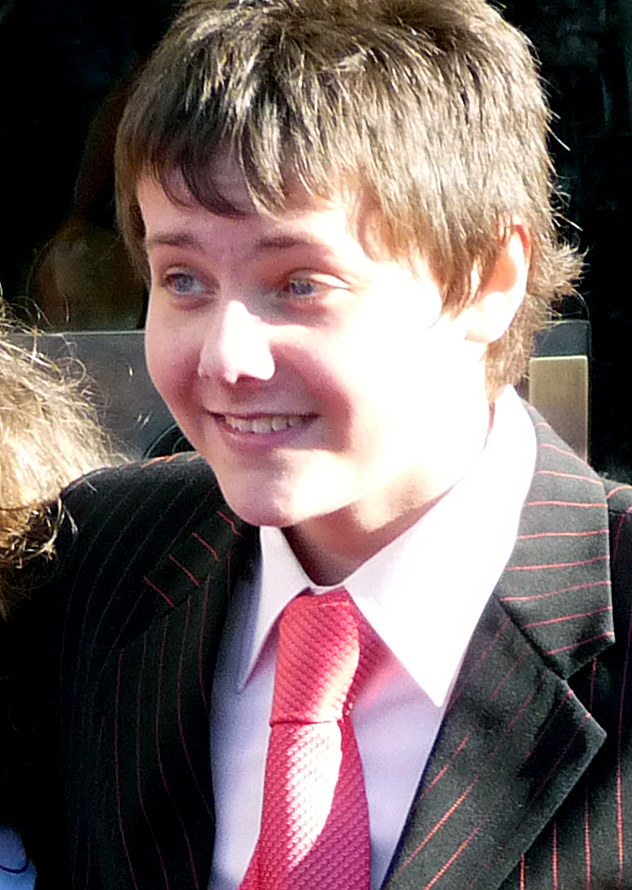
Drew-Honey at the BAFTA Awards in 2009

Between 2007 and 2024, Drew-Honey played Jake Brockman in the British sitcom Outnumbered. Other appearances have included The Armstrong & Miller Show and Doctors. He co-presented the CBBC series Friday Download from 2011 until 2012. He played Mr. Lovett in The Ministry of Curious Stuff for CBBC and the role of Dylan in the BBC Three sitcom Cuckoo (2012–2019).

He has done more than 200 voiceovers for television and radio, including for Red Bull and Dell, and was the voice of Lester Large in the children's animated series The Large Family. He was a presenter on the CBBC show Friday Download.

In 2014, Drew-Honey started presenting his own documentary series on BBC Three called Tyger Takes On..., presenting on pornography, the "perfect body", love, sexuality, and sexism. In this series he stated that he might be bisexual, clarifying his belief in a sexuality spectrum where he is not entirely straight.

In 2015, Drew-Honey appeared in the four-part series 24 Hours in the Past, along with five other celebrities, to experience what life was like in Victorian Britain. He also had guest roles in Citizen Khan, Midsomer Murders, and Death in Paradise. In 2016, he took part in the E4 dating series Celebs Go Dating. In 2018, he co-presented Episode 33 of The Calum McSwiggan Show on FUBAR Radio.

Drew-Honey has also appeared in a number of driving and car maintenance videos.

=== Film ===
He starred as Stuck-Up Steve in the 2011 film Horrid Henry: The Movie and had a role in the 2015 film Up All Night.

=== Music ===
In October 2011, Drew-Honey and his co-stars from Outnumbered, Daniel Roche and Ramona Marquez, covered "(Theme From) The Monkees" to raise funds for the BBC charity campaign Children in Need. A music video featuring them performing the song on the set of Outnumbered appeared on the Children in Need programme and was released on YouTube in November 2011.

In September 2022, Drew-Honey joined The Celebs alongside Jo O'Meara and Anne Hegerty to mark the 40th anniversary of the Michael Jackson classic album Thriller and raise money for Great Ormond Street Hospital, with a new rendition of the title track.

== Filmography ==
=== Film ===
Year	Title	Role
2011	Horrid Henry: The Movie	Stuck-Up Steve
2015	Up All Night	Caleb
2021	Me, Myself and Di	Jon Craven
2022	A Midsummer's Night Dream	Demetrius

=== Television ===
Year	Title	Role	Notes
2007	The Large Family	Lester Large	Series 2
2007–2010	The Armstrong & Miller Show	Various characters	Series 1–3
2007–2014; 2016; 2024; 2025	Outnumbered	Jake Brockman	Regular role; all episodes
2009	Doctors	Tom Barry	Episode: "Much Ado About Something"
2011–2013	Friday Download	Himself	Segment presenter
2012	The Magicians	Himself	1 episode
2012	Threesome	Chris Silverson	1 episode
2012–2019	Cuckoo	Dylan Thompson (32 episodes)	Regular role; series 1–5
2012–2013	The Ministry of Curious Stuff	Mr Lovett	Regular role; series 1–2
2014	Midsomer Murders	Ferdy Linklater	1 episode
2014	Sweat the Small Stuff	Himself	Series 3, episode 7
2014	Virtually Famous	Himself	Series 1, episode 1
2014–2015	Tyger Takes On...	Himself	Presenter (5 episodes)
2015–2016	Citizen Khan	Richard 'Scab'	Series 4, episode 6, Series 5, episode 4
2015	24 Hours in the Past	Himself	Participant
2015	Death in Paradise	Ryan Davison	1 episode
2015–2017	Scream Street	Luke Watson (voice)	Regular role; all episodes
2016	BBC Click	Himself	Special presenter, 1 episode
2016	The Chase: Celebrity Special	Himself	Contestant, 1 episode
2016	Celebs Go Dating	Himself	Participant
2016	Celebrity Mastermind	Himself	Contestant, 1 episode
2017	Celebrity MasterChef	Himself	Participant
2018	Richard Osman's House of Games	Himself	Participant
2019	Sadie Sparks	Blaine (voice)	
2021	Grantchester	Malcy Smith	1 episode
2025	Titanic Sinks Tonight	Harold Bride	4 episodes
2025	Jack the Ripper: Written in Blood	Ernest Parke	3 episodes

=== Stage ===
Year	Title	Role	Theatre	Notes
2025	Beauty and the Beast	Gaston	Fareham Live	Pantomime

=== Radio ===
Year	Title	Role	Notes
2010	All the Blood in My Veins	Paolo	BBC Radio 4
2012	Mr Blue Sky	Robbie Easter	BBC Radio 4
2013	The High Lodge of Revelatory Pleasures	Tristan	
2017	Blue	Blue	
2021	Harland	Dan	
2023	The Ballad of Syd & Morgan	Syd Barrett	BBC Radio 4

== Awards ==
Drew-Honey was nominated for Best Male Newcomer at the 2009 British Comedy Awards for his role in Outnumbered, but lost to Charlie Brooker.
