= DI Ray =

British police procedural drama TV series (2022-2024)

- Genre: Police procedural
- Created by: Maya Sondhi
- Written by: Maya Sondhi
- Directed by: Audrey Cooke; Alex Pillai; Nirpal Bhogal; Nicole Volavka
- Starring: Parminder Nagra; Gemma Whelan; Jamie Bamber
- Theme music composer: Edmund Butt
- Country of origin: United Kingdom
- Original language: English
- No. of series: 2
- No. of episodes: 10

Production
- Executive producers: Maya Sondhi; Paul Ashton
- Producer: Charlotte Surtees
- Production location: Birmingham
- Cinematography: Andrew McDonnell; Al Beech
- Production companies: Creative England; HTM Productions

Original release
- Network: ITV
- Release: 2 May 2022 – 21 July 2024

DI Ray is a British police procedural television series, airing in two series, in 2022 and 2024. It was created and written by Maya Sondhi and produced by Jed Mercurio. DI Ray stars Parminder Nagra as detective inspector Rachita Ray in a fictitious Birmingham-based police force. The cast also includes Gemma Whelan and Jamie Bamber.

The first series of four episodes aired on ITV beginning 2 May 2022. The second series of six episodes aired from 16 June 2024 in the United States and 20 October 2024 in the UK and in other territories. On 4 July 2025, ITV confirmed D.I. Ray had been axed after two series due to low ratings.

== Cast ==
=== Recurring ===
- Parminder Nagra as DI Rachita Ray
- Gemma Whelan as DCI Kerry Henderson
- Jamie Bamber as DCI Martyn Hunter
- Sam Baker-Jones as DC Liam Payne
- Peter Bankolé as DS Kwesi Edmund
- Maanuv Thiara as PS Tony Khatri
- Jessica Temple as DC Carly Lake
- Steve Oram as DS Clive Bottomly
- Ian Puleston-Davies as Supt. Ross Beardsmore

=== Series 2 ===
- Witney White as DC Charlene Ellis
- Lauren Drummond as Suzie Chapman
- Michael Socha as Dave Chapman
- Patrick Baladi as DI Patrick Holden
- Naomi Yang as Hiroka McGregor
- Taha Rahim as Ravinder Mochani
- Dinita Gohil as Amara Dhawan
- Jamie Bell as Stevo Miller

== Production ==
Lead actress Parminder Nagra described DI Ray's character as being "like a female Columbo in a green coat".

The first series was filmed during October and November 2021 in locations including Birmingham's Jewellery Quarter and outside Lloyd House police headquarters.

Series 2 was also filmed in Birmingham, with locations including the Jewellery Quarter and Hockley Flyover.

In July 2025, the show was cancelled.

== Episodes ==
=== Series 1 (2022) ===
No.	Title	Directed by	Written by	Original release date	UK viewers (millions)
1	Episode 1	Audrey Cooke	Maya Sondhi	2 May 2022	5.83
DI Rachita Ray is promoted to homicide after successfully talking down a man who stabbed a police officer after suffering from psychosis. She is in a secret relationship with fellow police officer Martyn Hunter, who proposes to her. On her first day on the job, she experiences microaggressions from other police officers and is given the wrong badge. On her first case, her boss assigns PS Khatri to work with Ray as she investigates the homicide of Imran Aziz, a local man who manages his family's cash and carry and is trying to set up a car company. Aziz, a Muslim man, was dating a Hindu woman, Anjuli Kapoor, at the time of his death. This leads DCI Henderson to believe it is an honour killing. Henderson pressures Ray to charge Anjuli's brothers with the crime. She avoids charging them, instead proving the brothers' alibi. Anjuli, in hiding, sends Ray Aziz's mobile and arranges a meeting with Ray. She tells Ray to come alone, but Ray send Khatri the address. Anjuli tells Ray that somebody had been threatening Aziz, and that his business might have been involved in criminal activity. Somebody scares Anjuli away, and Ray is knocked unconscious by a mysterious figure.
2	Episode 2	Audrey Cooke	Maya Sondhi	3 May 2022	5.06
Khatri finds Ray in the park, conscious but concussed. The next day, she and her team find Anjuli's body. Henderson assumes that Anjuli committed suicide, but Ray disagrees. After a relative of Anjuli's comes forward, saying that they heard Anjuli arguing with her eldest brother, he is arrested. Henderson now believes he murdered his sister as part of an honour killing, and Ray still disagrees. CCTV footage shows a man near Anjuli's car after her abduction, and after discussing Anjuli's conversation with her team, Ray realizes that Aziz was likely involved in drug dealing and organized crime. That night, while Ray is in the bath, a masked intruder enters her home and attempts to drown her with a towel, likely similarly to how Anjuli was killed. He is interrupted, presumably, by Hunter, who encourages Ray to move in with him. She also agrees to finally meet his parents, but, after arriving, is called away to interview Anjuli's younger brother. She discovers that Aziz met with somebody three days before his murder. She and her team track down a shipping container connected to Aziz. Upon entering the container, they find over a dozen dead bodies and one very weak teenager.
3	Episode 3	Alex Pillai	Maya Sondhi	4 May 2022	4.86
Ray and her team discover that the Vietnamese human trafficking victims they found were promised work in the UK, but in reality were to be kept as slaves. Ray talks to the girlfriend of Anjuli's killer, who doesn't tell her much. Ray is then called to Intelligence, who told that the man's real name is Marcus Tranter and that Aziz was informing them about Tranter's drug smuggling operation. They advise Ray not to interfere during her investigation. Ray finds the driver of the container, but he is killed in a hit and run before he can give her much information. Meanwhile, the woman who gave Ray the wrong badge files a formal complaint, accusing her of bullying. Ray, stressed by this and the driver's death, starts an affair with Khatri. A few days later, Khatri visits her house to drop off food. Unbeknownst to either of them, they are being watched by Hunter, holding a photograph of Khatri and Ray kissing. He calls Tranter and says "You were right. Do it." A motorcycle drives by, firing at Ray's house as she and Khatri stand in the doorway. Khatri is hit, but he knocks Ray out of harm's way as he falls.
4	Episode 4	Alex Pillai	Maya Sondhi	5 May 2022	4.86
The police arrive to take Khatri's body away. The investigating officer blames Ray for Khatri's death, saying that she should have been aware somebody was watching her. After the meeting, Hunter confronts Ray about why Khatri was at her house in the first place. The next day, Ray meets with Intelligence again, asking for more information. Intelligence agree to set up a meeting between her and Imran Aziz's handler. Ray discovers an address of Tranter's, and finds a videotape of Hunter having sex with an underage girl. Ray sets a trap for Hunter, and lies to him by saying that Intelligence were stopping her from investigating. Soon after, Ray is sent a mysterious text, purportedly from Aziz's handler, offering to meet. At the meeting is Hunter, not the handler. He admits to working for Tranter, and says that Tranter used the tape to blackmail him. Tranter, assisted by Hunter, tries to kidnap Ray. They are stopped, however, when the police show up, having been summoned by Ray. Despite their arrest and successfully solving the murders, Ray is informed that she will be suspended and investigated for Hunter's actions, and he says that Ray was not ready to take on such a high-profile case. Henderson tells Ray that she disagrees with this, and that Ray was ready after all.

=== Series 2 (2024) ===
No.	Title	Directed by	Written by	Original release date	UK viewers (millions)
1	Wrong Place	Nirpal Bhogal	Maya Sondhi	16 June 2024	N/A
2	Rivals	Nirpal Bhogal	Maya Sondhi	23 June 2024	N/A
3	The Hunt for Rav	Nirpal Bhogal	Maya Sondhi	30 June 2024	N/A
4	A Test of Wills	Nirpal Bhogal	Maya Sondhi	7 July 2024	N/A
5	Staying on Top	Nicole Volavka	Sarah Deane & Maya Sondhi	14 July 2024	N/A
6	Enemy Within	Nicole Volavka	Maya Sondhi	21 July 2024	N/A

== Broadcast ==
The first series of four episodes aired on ITV beginning 2 May 2022.

In November 2022, the series was renewed for a six-episode second series, which began filming in 2023. The second series aired from 16 June 2024 in the US, 24 July on SBS Television in Australia, and 20 October 2024 on ITV in the UK.

== Critical response ==
Lucy Mangan, writing for The Guardian, gave series 1 three out of a possible five stars. She praised Sondhi's use of "tangled motivations that hold the viewers' interest" to create a "police procedural with a fresh perspective" but felt that the story "at times moves a bit too slowly" and "feels a bit too by-numbers". Sean O'Grady for The Independent gave the series four stars out of five, describing the lead character as "a smart, sassy, tough telly detective" and summarising "low key in tone and atmosphere, DI Ray, cop and show, that is, deserves to be a success. Mercurio ticks another box."
