= Intimate Contact =

1987 BBC television series

Intimate Contact is a 1987 British television drama starring Daniel Massey, Claire Bloom, David Phelan and Abigail Cruttenden, which deals with the issue of the HIV/AIDS virus. Written by Alma Cullen and directed by Waris Hussein, the series was produced for Central Television, and aired on the ITV network in three hour-long episodes in March 1987. In the United States, it was later shown in two 90-minute episodes on the HBO channel. Massey and Bloom were both nominated in the Best Actor categories at the 1989 CableACE Awards. Massey subsequently won the accolade.

== Plot summary ==
Daniel Massey stars as Clive Gregory, a businessman who contracts AIDS during a business trip to New York City, where he has sex with a prostitute. The disease is diagnosed 18 months after the trip when he is hospitalized with viral pneumonia. Clive's wife, Ruth (Claire Bloom) is devastated by the news, and as the nature of Clive's condition becomes public knowledge the Gregorys face hostility and ignorance from friends, colleagues and those in the local community. As Clive's health deteriorates, Ruth campaigns for AIDS awareness. Clive also meets other people whose lives have been affected by HIV and AIDS. This was before it was acknowledged that men are more likely to give women HIV.

== Cast ==
- Claire Bloom as Ruth Gregory
- Daniel Massey as Clive Gregory
- David Phelan as Martin Gregory
- Abigail Cruttenden as Nell Gregory
- Mark Kingston as Bill Stanhope
- Sylvia Syms as Annie Stanhope
- Maggie Steed as Becca Crichton
- Paul Jesson as Trevor Singleton
- Danny Webb as Scott
- Neil Pearson as Morrie
- John Murtagh as Dennis
- Hugh Fraser as Vicar
- Derek Benfield as Edgar
- Mark Penfold as Paddy Firth
- James Woolley as George
- Sebastian Breaks as Marcus
- Scott Funnell as Fraser
- Lizzy McInnerny as Charlotte
- Amanda Walker as Pamela
- Kate Lansbury as Eleanor
- Patricia England as Ginnie
- Phyllida Hewat as Madge Pearson
- Pamela Pitchford as Mrs. Gordon
- John Joyce as Geoff Harris
- Sally Lahee as Alice
- Ben Dover as Nick
- Joan Blackham as Headmistress
- Sally Jane Jackson as Sharon
- Nicholas McArdle as M.C.
- Geraldine Griffiths as Secretary
- Linzi Drew as New York Hooker
- Tina Shaw as New York Hooker
- Sandy Grizzle as New York Hooker
- Rupert Massey as David Langley

== Awards and nominations ==
Awards and Nominations
Award	Category	Nominee	Result
1989 CableACE Awards	Actor in a Dramatic or Theatrical Special	Daniel Massey	Won
1989 CableACE Awards	Actress in a Dramatic or Theatrical Special	Claire Bloom	Nominated
