= Krupa Pattani =

English actress (born 1984)

- Born: Krupa Hasmukh Pattani; 11 March 1984 (age 42); Enfield, London, England
- Occupation: Actress
- Years active: 2001–present
- Television: Citizen Khan; Hollyoaks

Krupa Hasmukh Pattani (born 11 March 1984) is an English actress, known for portraying the roles of Shazia Khan in the BBC sitcom Citizen Khan (2015–2016) and Farrah Maalik in the Channel 4 soap opera Hollyoaks (2017–2019).

== Life and career ==
Pattani was born on 11 March 1984 in Enfield, London. She initially planned on becoming a vet, undertaking work experience and getting a job a Pets at Home. She subsequently began taking acting lessons and studied at University of Winchester and Drama Studio London, before making her screen debut in 2001 in an episode of the BBC medical drama Casualty as Josie Duggan. She subsequently took on various guest and supporting roles, including appearances as a newsreader in M.I. High and as a bank manager in Emmerdale.

In 2015, she portrayed the role of Caneze in a production of Blood. The same year, she joined the cast of the BBC sitcom Citizen Khan as Shazia Khan, taking over the role from Maya Sondhi, appearing in the final two series of the show. Between 2017 and 2019, she portrayed the role of Farrah Maalik in the Channel 4 soap opera Hollyoaks. She also appeared in the radio comedy drama Bindi Business as Anu. Her other credits have included EastEnders, Midsomer Murders, Tin Star, Ali & Ava, Ron's Gone Wrong, Biff & Chip, Without Sin, Vampire Academy, Silent Witness and Mr Bates vs The Post Office. In 2025, she appeared in Swallow the Lake at the Mercury Theatre.

== Filmography ==
Year	Title	Role	Notes
2001	Casualty	Josie Duggan	Episode: "Facing the Future"
2005	Give and Take	Maria Marsden	Film role
2006	The Bond	Lucy	Film role
2008–2010	M.I. High	Newsreader	3 episodes
2010	Bunch of Guys	Anita	Film role
2013	Smoke	Mina	Short film
2014	Honeycomb Lodge	Seema	Film role
2015	Emmerdale	Bank Manager	1 episode
2015–2016	Citizen Khan	Shazia Khan	Regular role
2016–2017	EastEnders	Anjali Mitra	2 episodes
2017–2019	Bindi Business	Anu	Radio drama
2017	Coconut	Camilla Armstrong	Multiple episodes
2017–2019	Hollyoaks	Farrah Maalik	Regular role
2019	Midsomer Murders	Simone Skye	Episode: “With Baited Breath”
2020	Tin Star	Jenny Martin	1 episode
2020	Bina & Betty	Bina	Also creator and co-director
2021	Ron’s Gone Wrong	Sita	Voice role
2021	Ali & Ava	Usma	Film role
2021	Eat Chips, Love	Sonal	Short film
2021–2023	Biff & Chip	Mrs. Patel	Main role
2022	Vampire Academy	Delilah	2 episodes
2022	Without Sin	Meera Chopa	4 episodes
2023	Silent Witness	D.C. Meena Puri	2 episodes
2023	Mittens & Pants	Apricot / Mittens' Mum	Voice role
2024	Mr Bates vs The Post Office	Saman Kaur	3 episodes
2024	Odd Squad	Miss Information	2 episodes
