= Salome's Last Dance =

- DVD cover
- Directed by: Ken Russell
- Written by: Ken Russell
- Based on: Salome by Oscar Wilde
- Produced by: Penny Corke
- Starring: Glenda Jackson; Stratford Johns; Nickolas Grace; Douglas Hodge; Imogen Millais-Scott
- Cinematography: Harvey Harrison
- Edited by: Timothy Gee
- Music by: Richard Cooke
- Production company: Jolly Russell Productions
- Distributed by: Vestron Pictures
- Release date: 6 May 1988 (New York City)
- Running time: 87 minutes
- Country: United Kingdom
- Language: English
- Budget: $800,000 or $1.4 million

Salome's Last Dance is a 1988 British film written and directed by Ken Russell. Although most of the action is a verbatim performance of Oscar Wilde's 1891 play Salome, which is itself based on a story from the New Testament, there is also a framing narrative that was written by Russell.

== Plot ==
Oscar Wilde and his lover Lord Alfred "Bosie" Douglas arrive late on Guy Fawkes Night in 1892 at their friend Alfred Taylor's brothel, where they are treated to a surprise staging of Wilde's play Salome, public performances of which have just been banned in England by the Lord Chamberlain's office.

In the play, all the roles are played by prostitutes or their clients, and each person present (except Wilde) plays two roles, one in the brothel and the other in the play. King Herod begs his young stepdaughter Salome to dance for him, promising to give her anything she desires, much to the irritation of her mother, Herodias. Salome ignores him, choosing instead to try to seduce John the Baptist, who is Herod's prisoner.

John responds by loudly condemning both Herod and Salome in the name of God. A spurned and vengeful Salome then agrees to dance for Herod — on the condition that she be given anything she asks for. Herod agrees, but it is only after the dance is over that Salome asks for the head of John the Baptist on a platter. Herod is appalled, tries to dissuade her, but finally gives in to her request. The scenes from the play are interwoven with images of Wilde's exploits at the brothel.

At the end of the play, Salome is killed on Herod's orders. Wilde, Alfred and Herodias' actress Lady Alice discuss the performance when a policeman arrives to arrest Wilde and Alfred for several acts of indecency; it is implied that Bosie has tipped off the police, jealous of Wilde's tryst with one of the actors in the play. It is then revealed that the young servant playing Salome has actually been murdered at the end of the performance. Lady Alice is also taken in as a witness to testify, gleefully stating that the young girl "slipped on a banana skin" as the carriage leaves for the police station.

== Cast ==
- Glenda Jackson as Herodias / Lady Alice Fitzkensington Windsor
- Stratford Johns as Herod Antipas / Alfred Taylor
- Nickolas Grace as Oscar Wilde
- Douglas Hodge as John the Baptist / Lord Alfred "Bosie" Douglas
- Imogen Millais-Scott as Salome / Rose
- Denis Lill as Tigellenus / Chilvers
- Russell Lee Nash as Pageboy
- Ken Russell as Cappadocian / Kenneth
- David Doyle as Nubian
- Warren Saire as Young Syrian
- Kenny Ireland as 1st Soldier
- Michael Van Wijk as 2nd Soldier
- Paul Clayton as 1st Nazarean
- Imogen Claire as 2nd Nazarean
- Leon Herbert as Namaan
- Tim Potter as Pharisee
- Linzi Drew as 1st Slave
- Mike Edmonds as 1st Jew
- Sheree Murphy as Child

== Production ==
Ken Russell had been signed by Vestron to a three-picture deal after the success of Gothic, of which this was the first. Imogen Millais-Scott went blind three weeks before filming after contracting glandular fever but Russell insisted on still using her. It has been suggested that she was too weak to perform the dance of the seven veils sequence and a body double was used, but in any case a male of similar build performs Salome's dance and, at one point, flashes male genitals.

"It's a tale that can be interpreted in many ways," said Russell. "Years ago, I wrote it into a script titled Space Gospel, which was the New Testament in science-fiction. It didn't work out. I also thought of using the opera with the dance of the seven veils for my segment in Aria... but they wanted $3,000 a minute for the music."

For dramatic effect, Russell compressed the actual arrest of Oscar Wilde in 1895 and the first performance of his play in Paris in 1896. Russell said, "Although the play was never produced in London during his lifetime - even though he had Sarah Bernhardt actually in rehearsals for it before it was banned - I just made up the conceit of showing it in the brothel to give a flavor of what his life at the time was like, and at the same time give a hint of the homosexual relationship with Bosie that really was his downfall. All of this is interwoven with the play, which is about love and corruption and deceit anyway."

Russell later claimed he made the film on a bet that he could not make a movie under $1 million. The film was made for $1.3 million with filming completed in three and a half weeks.

Shortly after filming Russell said "The critics haven't worn me down, so maybe I'm trying to wear them down. I'm also trying to reach a wider - and younger - audience, and make films that are more visually stimulating. It isn't easy. I've never made a film I was totally happy with. That's what keeps me going: the next one must be better."

== Reception ==
This film met with modest critical praise. The review in The New York Times called it "a perfumed, comic stunt," but noted that "Mr. Russell forces one to attend to (and to discover the odd glory in) the Wilde language, which, on the printed page, works faster than valium."

The Los Angeles Times called it "languid and tedious... virtually devoid of genuine eroticism of any persuasion but also is so static that the play itself bores rather than involves."
