= The Large Family =

Anglo-French animated series

- Genre: Children's television series
- Voices of: Jeff Rawle; Paula Wilcox; Tyger Drew-Honey; Rosie Day; Thomas Mole
- Composer: John Du Prez
- Countries of origin: United Kingdom; France; India; Luxembourg (Season 1)
- Original languages: English; French
- No. of seasons: 2
- No. of episodes: 52

Production
- Executive producers: Michael Haggiag (Indie Kids/Coolabi); Eric Garnet (Go-N Productions); Lilian Eche (LuxAnimation, Series 1); Ariane Payen (LuxAnimation, Series 1); Tapaas Chakravarti (DQ Entertainment)
- Producers: Dan Maddicott (Indie Kids/Coolabi); Fiona Stuart (for Truepenny (Indie Kids/Coolabi))
- Running time: 15 minutes per episode (approx.)
- Production companies: Coolabi Productions (Note: Originally created as Indie Kids in earlier prints prior to Coolabi purchasing the studio.); GO-N Productions; DQ Entertainment; LuxAnimation (Season 1)

Original release
- Network: CBeebies (UK); TF1 (France); Playhouse Disney (France)
- Release: October 15, 2007 – March 5, 2010

The Large Family (French: La Famille Trompette) is an animated children's television series based on the book series of the same name written by Jill Murphy and published by Walker Books in the United Kingdom. The series was produced by Coolabi Productions, GO-N Productions, LuxAnimation (Series 1) and DQ Entertainment, with the participation of TF1, Playhouse Disney France and CBeebies (Season 2), with distribution handled through GO-N Distribution (European French speaking territories) and BBC Worldwide (All other countries). The series focuses on a family of anthropomorphic elephants, the Larges. It consists of two seasons with 26 episodes of up to 12 minutes each.

== Characters ==
=== The Large Family ===
- Mr Larry Large/M. Trompette (voiced by Jeff Rawle in the English version, and Bruno Magne in the French version): The kind-hearted patriarch of the family.
- Mrs Linda Large/Mme Trompette (voiced by Paula Wilcox in the English version, and Simone Herault (Season 1) and Emmanuelle Bondeville (Season 2) in the French version): The sometimes forgetful matriarch of the family.
- Lester Large/Lester Trompette (voiced by Oliver Bee (Season 1) and Tyger Drew-Honey (Season 2) in the English version, and Florentin Crouzet (Season 1) and Antoine Buchez (Season 2) in the French version): The oldest Large child in the family who can occasionally be seen riding a skateboard. Lester normally acts "cool". He mostly wears an orange hoodie and brown trousers.
- Laura Large/Laura Trompette (voiced by Rosie Day in the English version, and Emmylou Homs in the French version): The second-oldest Large child who is pretty much in charge of the other three Large children. She is the most sensible and level-headed of the Larges and enjoys painting pictures.
- Luke Large/Luke Trompette (voiced by Thomas Mole in the English version, and Valentin Maupin in the French version): The second-youngest Large child who mostly wears a green shirt and light blue trousers. Excitable and eager, Luke usually goes along with whatever his older siblings are doing.
- Lucy Large/Lucy Trompette (voice actor unknown): The youngest of the Large children who can only say a few words like "Me" and "Too".
- Grandma/Grand Mère (voiced by Eve Karpf in the English version, and Coco Noël in the French version): Grandma is Lester, Laura, Luke and Lucy's maternal grandmother, Linda's mother and Larry's mother-in-law.
- Grandpa/Grand Père (voiced by Robbie Stevens in the English version, and Benoît Allemane in the French version): Grandpa is Lester, Laura, Luke and Lucy's maternal grandfather, Linda's father and Larry's father-in-law.

=== The Smart Family ===
- Mr Seymour Smart/M. Smart (voiced by Struan Rodger in the English version, and Paul Borne in the French version): The Larges' next-door neighbour. His job is unspecified, but he seems to be reasonably well-off, providing his family with expensive things and holidays.
- Mrs Sheena Smart/Mme Smart (voiced by Josie Lawrence in the English version, and Nathalie Homs in the French version): Mr Smart's snobbish, stuck-up wife. She is a full-time busybody who feels the need to interfere in the business of others (particularly the Larges), whether they want her help or not.
- Sebastian Smart/Sébastien Smart (voiced by Theo Smith in the English version, and Léo Caruso in the French version): Mr. and Mrs Smart's slightly mollycoddled son. He is friends with the Large children (something his parents are not very happy with), and plays the trombone.
- Sarah Smart (voiced by Mae Wright in the English version, voice actor unknown in the French version): Sebastian's cousin, and the object of Lester's affections, which she clearly returns.

=== Others ===
- Miss Lovely: The teacher at the Large children's school.
- Simon Short: The owner of the local store.
- Peter Perfect (voiced by Theo Smith): The boy at school who's good at everything.
- Simon Strong: He is only mentioned in the episode "Dino Disaster".
- Micky Muddle: He is only mentioned in the episode "The Wrong End of the Stick".
- Susan Special (voiced by Mae Wright): The girl at school who's in fashion.
- Mrs. Gray: One of the Large Family's elderly neighbours. She once took on teaching Lester's class when Miss Lovely was ill in "The Old New Teacher".
- Mr. Grand: Another of the Larges' elderly neighbours.
- Julie: One of Laura's friends.
- Lola: A girl who appears in the episode "Mr Short's Christmas", who also has a crush on Lester Large (apparently before Lester Large met Sarah).

== Episodes ==
=== Season 1 ===
1. "Flour Power"
2. "Girls' Stuff"
3. "Good as Gold"
4. "Sports Day"
5. "Elephants Never Forget"
6. "Sniffles and Snuffles"
7. "The Great Explorer"
8. "Easy Peasy"
9. "Under the Stars"
10. "The Wrong End of the Stick"
11. "Fancy That"
12. "Queen of the Castle"
13. "The Mystery of the Missing Elephant"
14. "You Can Do It"
15. "Sebastian's Sleepover"
16. "Spring Clean"
17. "X Marks the Spot"
18. "Picture Perfect"
19. "Six Go to the Seaside"
20. "Baby Chilly"
21. "Sebastian's Cousin Sarah"
22. "Mr Short Takes a Holiday"
23. "Super Elly"
24. "Me Too"
25. "The Big Race"
26. "Not Again"

=== Season 2 ===
1. "The Babysitter"
2. "Mrs Large's Birthday Boogie"
3. "The School Fete"
4. "Roto-whizzers"
5. "No Place Like Home"
6. "While the Cat's Away"
7. "The Blackout"
8. "The Play's the Thing"
9. "What a Load of Rubbish"
10. "Pachyderm Park"
11. "Father's Day"
12. "A Dino Disaster"
13. "Rock Star"
14. "Don't Do It Yourself"
15. "Trendy Trouble"
16. "You Are What You Eat"
17. "The E-Factor"
18. "Girl Power"
19. "Happy Birthday, Luke"
20. "Four Go Away Together"
21. "Mrs Large's Big Night"
22. "A Walk in the Woods"
23. "A Relaxing Day"
24. "Mr Short's Christmas"
25. "The Old New Teacher"
26. "My Cousin, Little Luke"

== Production ==
Production of the book series was announced when production company Indie Kids was established in September 2002

== Broadcast ==
The series first aired in the United Kingdom on CBeebies on 15 October 2007. The series premiered in France on TF1 on 29 October on the same year, with its pay-TV premiere on Playhouse Disney in October 2008.

By October 2008, BBC Worldwide had pre-sold the series in over 22 territories, including Australia, Portugal, Iran and Sweden.
