= Linzi Drew =

English pornographic actress

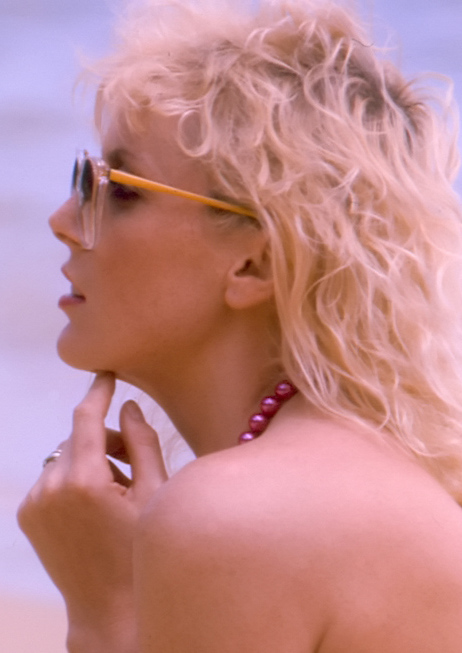
- Drew on a beach on the Algarve in Continental Portugal, 1986
- Born: Lindsey Jane Drew; 11 May 1958 (age 68); Bristol, England
- Other name: Mistress Monique
- Occupations: Glamour model; producer; adult model; pornographic actress
- Partner: Ben Dover (1980s–2011)
- Children: Tyger Drew-Honey

Lindsey Jane Drew (born 11 May 1958), better known by her stage-name Linzi Drew, is a retired pornography actress, pornography director, writer, model and actress.

== Pornography career ==
Drew's pornographic career began in the early 80s, under the guidance of glamour photographer George Harrison Marks, she starred in various videos for Corporal Punishment Videos; Warden's End (1981). Prior to pornography she was working as a Page 3 model and a stripper. In the 1980s, she appeared nude each month in the softcore magazine Club International. She retired from the industry at the age of 35.

She went on to become a writer for Penthouse magazine. She appeared on the front cover of the 1984, Roger Waters concept album The Pros and Cons of Hitch Hiking. She also appeared alongside W.A.S.P's performance at the 1987, Monsters of Rock festival.

In the 1990s, Drew was arrested for illegally distributing pornography, something she and then-boyfriend Simon Honey (Ben Dover) discussed in the BBC documentary Open Space in the episode titled; More Sex Please, We're British. In 1991, she released and directed her own pornography film titled Striptacular, which featured Eileen Daly among other glamour and pornography models.

She has also had minor roles in a handful of mainstream films, including; An American Werewolf in London (1981), The Rainbow Thief (1990), and a number of Ken Russell films including; Aria (1987), Salome's Last Dance (1988) and The Lair of the White Worm (1988).

== Personal life ==
In 1993, she published her autobiography; Try Everything Once Except Incest and Morris Dancing: The Intimate Autobiography of a Dangerous Lady. The book chronicles her time as a groupie and her career.

She is the mother of British actor Tyger Drew-Honey.

== Filmography ==
Pornography credits
Year	Title	Role	Notes
1981	Warden's End	Self; actress	
1981	The Cane	Self; actress	
1981	Emmanuelle in Soho	Showgirl	Non-sex scenes
1981	Electric Blue 006	Jello wrestler	Uncredited
1981	Death Shock	Housekeeper	
1983	Wrong Time Wrong Place	Self; actress	
1983	Rock 'N' Roll Ransom	Stripper	
1984	Mr. Abel	Self; actress	
1984	Electric Blue 17	Self; actress	
1985	Electric Blue 20	Self; actress	
1987	Electric Blue I Love Linzi Drew	Self; actress	
1988	The Zeta Sexy Video Show	Self; actress	
1988	Buttman's Favorite Legs and Ass	Self; actress	Archive footage
1988	Dirty Woman	Amanda	
1989	Dirty Woman: Part Two	Amanda	
1991	An American Buttman in London	Self; actress	
1991	Euroticon 3	Self; actress	
1991	Striptacular	Self; actress	
1992	Erotic Dreams	Self; actress	
1992	Members Only	Self; actress	
1992	Members Only, No.2	Self; actress	
1992	Members Only, No.3	Self; actress	
1993	Members Only, No.4	Self; actress	
1993	Members Only, No.5	Self; actress	
1994	The Best of Electric Blue 18: Girls on Top	Self; actress	
1994	Buttman's Bouncin' British Babes	Hair salon owner	
1995	Best of Electric Blue: Bottoms Up	Self; actress	
1995	Thunder Boobs	Self; actress	
1996	Lesbian Lovers 2	Self; actress	Archive footage
2001	Buttman: Before They Were Stars	Self; actress	Archive footage
2002	Celebrity Shags 13	Self; actress	Archive footage

Film and television
Year	Title	Role	Notes
1981	An American Werewolf in London	Brenda Bristols	
1982	There's A Lot of It About	Various roles	3 episodes
1983	Floating Off	Stripper	TV film
1983	The Skin Horse	Self; model	Documentary
1984	The Making of a Horror Film	Self; model	Documentary, uncredited
1985	Hold the Back Page	Stripper	1 episode
1986	Gems	Model	1 episode
1986	Dempsey and Makepeace	Stripper	1 episode
1986	Lytton's Diary	Beauty show contestant	Uncredited
1987	Intimate Contact	Prostitute	1 episode
1987	C.A.T.S Eyes	Stripper	1 episode
1987	Aria	Girl	
1987	Big George Is Dead	Stripper	TV film
1988	Hot Metal	Stephanie	Uncredited
1988	The Last Resort with Jonathan Ross	Self; guest	1 episode
1988	Salome's Last Dance	1st slave	
1988	The Lair of the White Worm	Maid	
1990	The Rainbow Thief	Madame Rainbow	
1993	Open Space	Self; feature	Documentary
1993-1994	Whale on	Self; feature	2 episodes
2006	Tricky TV	Self; guest	1 episode
2009	Beware the Moon: Remembering An American Werewolf in London	Self; feature	Documentary
2016	Respectable: The Mary Millington Story	Self; feature	Documentary
2024	Saucy!: Secrets of the British Sex Comedy	Self; feature	Documentary
