= Down on Abby =

2014 British pornographic film

- Directed by: Gazzman
- Produced by: Harmony Films
- Starring: Lexi Lowe; Ben Dover
- Production company: Harmony Films
- Release date: 1 April 2014
- Country: United Kingdom
- Language: English

Down on Abby: Tales from Bottomley Manor is a 2014 pornographic comedy film that parodies the British television series Downton Abbey. The film is the first porn parody produced by British studio Harmony Films and directed by Gazzman. The film includes an all-British cast, including Ben Dover and Lexi Lowe as the title character "Abby", and was filmed in a castle near Birmingham. Gazzman states that the local town council tried to get the shoot closed down when villagers realized what was going on at their castle, but the production wrapped successfully. The parody garnered mainstream attention, including the cast of Downtown Abbey. Down on Abby received mixed reviews; contemporary publications criticized its narrative inaccuracies, while adult industry reviewers acclaimed it.

== Plot ==
Down on Abby is set at the beautiful Bottomley Manor, home to the eccentric and debauched Lord and Lady Grabhem and their stepdaughters Abby and Fanny. The film follows the upper-class family upstairs and members of the working-class staff downstairs, including characters with names such as Master Bates, as they prepare for a dinner party quite unlike any other.

== Cast ==
- Lexi Lowe as Abby
- Ben Dover as Lord Grabhem
- Jasmine Jae as Lady Grabhem
- Jasmine James as Fanny
- Ryan Ryder as Lord Stiffie
- Jess West as Lady Stiffie
- Ava Dalush as Missy
- Cathy Heaven as Lucy
- Emma Leigh as Betty
- Clarke Kent as Master Bates
- Tony De Sergio as Smallcock
- Dimitris XXX as James
- Big Bad Dave as Smithers

== Release ==
The film was released on region-free DVD on 1 April 2014. A softcore version is also available to buy from Amazon.com

Television X announced that they had acquired the film's exclusive television rights and would be airing one episode a week from 5 April 2014.

== Press ==
Down on Abby garnered attention from international mainstream press as well as adult industry-related media since the announcement of its production with mentions from Jimmy Fallon on the Jimmy Fallon Show, Cosmopolitan, Time, The Sun-Herald and the London Metro among others.

Stars of the main Downton Abbey show have expressed dismissive opinions on the porn parody. Michelle Dockery spoke of her "porn doppelgänger" Jasmine Jae, pointing to Jae on the cover and saying "That's me, is it? The one with the extremely large breasts?" during an interview with Conan O'Brien on Conan.

Hugh Bonneville was also asked about his opinion of Down on Abby by Brad Blanks on the red carpet of The Monuments Men première in New York City. When told the title, Bonnevile stated "that's hilarious" before jokingly asking Bob Balaban if he had directed it. Balaban replied that he had been the assistant director. Bonnevile stated that he "can't wait to watch it" and that he would get the Downton Abbey crew around to watch it for a Saturday night event.

== Reception ==
The parody has had a mixed reception. Mainstream press appear to give generally negative reviews of the parody. A New York magazine writer commented that although the parody of the Downton Abbey was humorous, it was "rife with historical inaccuracies" and "not recommended for those who get distracted by historically inaccurate details like squared-off French tips and thongs." A writer for Cosmopolitan magazine wrote: "What I witnessed were things that were both horrifying and factually incorrect: This nonsense would never have happened at Downton Abbey or any respectable 1920's British country estate."

In contrast, adult industry reviewers give a generally more positive review. A reviewer for the porn review website Die Screaming wrote: "After watching Down on Abby, I can say with absolute certainty that the movie more than lived up to all the hype surrounding it." and "Down on Abby delivers a solid hardcore porn film wrapped in the luxurious look and feel of British aristocratic wealth, which is exactly what you’d want from a Downton Abbey porn parody." He added "I also need to take a moment to stand up and applaud Lexi Lowe. Her scene with Tony DeSergio and Clarke Kent was arguably the highlight of the movie, with Ms. Lowe delivering a performance that will make your jaw drop." and ended the review with 5/5 stars.

Another review from adult DVD review site XCritic noted: "I was surprised at how good I thought the movie was. A porn parody of Downton Abby was inevitable, but it found a way to get beautiful and sexy stars to parody the costume drama and mix in hot, depraved sex. I loved the puns with the names (Smallcock, Lord Stiffie, Lady Stiffie, etc.) and thought it was very funny overall. This parody is highly recommended."

=== Awards ===
- Best Adult Film 2014 – Paul Raymond Awards (Pending)
