= Anil Gupta (writer) =

British comedy writer (born 1974)

Anil Gupta is a British comedy writer. He is known for being the executive producer of The Office, for which he won two BAFTA Awards and was nominated for an Emmy Award. His other major credits for writing and/or producing include Goodness Gracious Me, The Kumars at No. 42, Citizen Khan and Bromwell High. He has also written episodes for Fairy Tales and ElvenQuest. In 2018, Gupta co-wrote and produced a modernised version of Molière's Tartuffe for the Royal Shakespeare Company.
