= Citizen Khan =

Family-based British sitcom

- Series 4 & 5 Title Card
- Genre: Sitcom
- Created by: Adil Ray
- Developed by: Anil Gupta; Richard Pinto; Adil Ray
- Written by: Anil Gupta; Richard Pinto; Adil Ray
- Directed by: Nick Wood
- Starring: Adil Ray; Shobu Kapoor; Bhavna Limbachia; Maya Sondhi; Abdullah Afzal; Kris Marshall; Matthew Cottle; Krupa Pattani
- Theme music composer: Kam Frantic
- Country of origin: United Kingdom
- Original language: English
- No. of series: 5
- No. of episodes: 34 (list of episodes)

Production
- Executive producer: Mark Freeland
- Producer: Paul Schlesinger
- Production location: dock10 studios
- Running time: 25–28 minutes
- Production company: BBC

Original release
- Network: BBC One (2012–2016); BBC One HD (2012–2016)
- Release: 27 August 2012 – 23 December 2016

Citizen Khan is a British sitcom produced by the BBC and created by Adil Ray. It ran for five series, from 2012 to 2016. It is set in Sparkhill, South Birmingham, described by its lead character, a British Pakistani man named Mr Khan (Ray), as "the capital of British Pakistan". Citizen Khan follows the trials and tribulations of Mr Khan, a loud-mouthed, patriarchal, cricket-loving, self-appointed community leader, and his long suffering wife Razia (played by Shobu Kapoor) and daughters Shazia (Maya Sondhi 2012–2014, Krupa Pattani 2015–2016) and Alia (Bhavna Limbachia). In Series One, Kris Marshall was Dave, the manager of Mr Khan's local mosque.

The title of the show is a play on the title of the Orson Welles film Citizen Kane. The character Mr Khan had already featured in the BBC Two comedy series Bellamy's People, on BBC Radio 4's Down the Line and on his own online series on the BBC Comedy website. On 27 September 2012, the BBC announced that Citizen Khan had been commissioned for a second series. On 2 December 2013, BBC controller Charlotte Moore announced that Citizen Khan had been renewed for a third series which began airing on 31 October 2014. On 11 December 2014, BBC comedy controller Shane Allen announced that a fourth series had been commissioned. On 14 October 2015, the official Facebook page of Citizen Khan confirmed through a video of Mr Khan that the fourth series would begin on 30 October 2015. On 20 January 2016, it was confirmed the show would return for a fifth and final series which started airing on 4 November 2016.

Although Adil Ray is a Muslim, the show has divided opinion on whether its humour is a mockery of followers of that religion and of stereotyping British Pakistanis. This includes some critics who suggested it belittled British Muslims according to its production style, defined by "agonizing pauses for canned laughter, and its farcical visual jokes." Ray maintains that Mr Khan is a comic character who is intended for families of any ethnic background to relate to, as with other British family sitcoms. The show subsequently moved onto being repeated on Gold.

== Broadcast and reception ==
The first episode of Citizen Khan was first broadcast on BBC One on 27 August 2012, in a late timeslot of 10:20pm. It received what Digital Spy referred to as an "impressive" 3.41 million viewers and 20.9% of the audience.

The Independent's Hasnet Lais stated: "Credit must be given to Adil Ray for not sparing any sacred cows and shining light on the conundrum of some British Muslim women under the patriarchal cosh."

The BBC received more than 700 complaints following the airing of the first episode, with a further 20 complaints made to Ofcom. Some British Muslims claimed that the show "ridicules" and "insults" Islam. The BBC claimed it had evidence the complaints were part of a lobbying campaign and countered it saying a number of people, including those of Muslim communities, praised the show and referred to its audience figures as a "very positive start."

The first episode of Citizen Khan garnered considerable criticism for a scene in which the character Mr. Khan's daughter pretends to pray and bows before the Qur'an as a "holy charade" for her father's benefit, which was seen as desacralizing Islamic practices. This led to accusations of Islamophobia and the show being labelled as "racist", "embarrassing" and "old-fashioned" in some newspapers. Despite this, the show's writer, Adil Ray, defended it as a product of his own background and familiarity with the community.

The Independent's Arifa Akbar commented negatively on its many clichéd jokes and character traits, drawing many comparisons with 1970s-style sitcoms. Mark Jones of The Guardian was more optimistic, describing it as "an affable enough debut, deserving a wider audience than this post-watershed slot is likely to attract."

The Islam Channel broadcast a special show entitled Politics and Media: Citizen Khan – Racist stereotypes or harmless fun? Presenter John Rees discussed whether the BBC comedy was stereotyping Muslims, or whether it was fun and could be laughed about by Muslims.

By the second episode, broadcast on 3 September, Citizen Khan clips had gone viral. Opinion outside the United Kingdom was also mixed, resulting in many heated debates. The Pakistani newspaper The News International criticised the BBC's use of Pakistani flags in the Khans' home, and Mr Khan's younger daughter quickly putting on a hijab and pretending to read the Qur'an. The Pakistan News Watch website countered that "shows like Citizen Khan are essential in multicultural societies and help put all communities on an equal footing – if everyone can have a laugh at everyone else's expense, then no one can claim superiority." The debate continued for a third week, with the Yorkshire Post publishing an article by Pakistani journalist Sabbiyah Pervez appealing to her own community to "stop being so defensive and learn to laugh at itself."

The BBC ordered a seven-episode second series on 27 September 2012 due to good ratings. On 18 September 2013, the BBC announced that the second series would air on Friday nights in the prime-time 9.30pm slot from 4 October.

In an interview with The Guardian, Adil Ray stated: "What I've intended to do with Citizen Khan is a good thing – to make Mr Khan a good character, to make him universal and a communication between different communities."

Series 3 of Citizen Khan gained an audience of around five million per episode, including iPlayer views. Ahead the Series 4 debut in October 2015, Vicky Power of The Daily Telegraph stated: "It's harmless, friendly fun for the whole family." Series 4 of Citizen Khan made its debut on 30 October 2015. The series attracted a record 3.3 million viewers.

Citizen Khan has been exported to Australia, India, Russia, Bulgaria and New Zealand, spawned Christmas specials and prompted a UK-wide "live" tour of regional theatres. Speaking to The Daily Telegraph in 2015 ahead of the launch of series 4, Adil Ray stated that fans of the show realise it is a "big laugh out loud comedy, not a reflection of every Muslim or Pakistani family in the country."

From Series 4, the role of Shazia Khan was taken over by Krupa Pattani, replacing Maya Sondhi.

Ray reported that he received death threats for the show, including one threatening a riot. He has stated that his influences came from comedies such as Only Fools and Horses and Fawlty Towers that were aimed at family audiences, and his desire for families of all backgrounds to be able to see elements of Khan's character in their father figure. Ray has claimed that for every complaint he had over a scene in which Khan's daughter Alia hurriedly covers her head in the presence of her father, he received ten messages from Muslims, Catholics and Jews relating to the experience of a child behaving similarly.

In April 2016, the show was condemned in parliament by Rupa Huq, the Labour MP for Ealing Central and Acton, who called its portrayal of a Birmingham Muslim family "quite backward".

In June 2021, Ray was in a debate on Good Morning Britain about "woke" comedy rows, and stated that the BBC was thinking about making a Christmas Special, but conversations would need to be had about the content and 'offensive stereotypes'.

== Awards ==
- 2014 – Royal Television Society, Best Performance in a Comedy – Adil Ray
- 2014 – Royal Television Society, Best Comedy Programme – Citizen Khan
- 2013 – Asian Media Awards, Best TV Character – Citizen Khan
- 2013 – Royal Television Society, Best Performance in a Comedy – Adil Ray
- 2013 – Royal Television Society, Best Comedy Programme – Citizen Khan

== Appearances ==
The character of Mr Khan has made appearances at Children in Need 2014 (in which he appeared as a guest in the EastEnders pub), The Queen Victoria, Comic Relief 2015, (in which he joked he was hoping to be considered for Jeremy Clarkson's job at Top Gear), the FA Cup Final 2015 (supporting local Birmingham team Aston Villa), and in October 2015, took over the train announcements at Birmingham New Street station for an hour. On Friday 18 November 2016, the cast of Citizen Khan made an appearance on Children in Need in a live sketch, Citizen Khan v Citizen Kane, in which they were joined by comedian Russell Kane and his family for a dance off. On 11 March 2017, Adil Ray appeared as Mr Khan on Let's Sing and Dance for Comic Relief as a judge.

In 2026, Ray revived Mr. Khan on TikTok, YouTube and Instagram, with the character sharing his views on politics and current affairs.

== Episodes ==
Series	Start date	End date	Episodes	Broadcast time	Notes
1	27 August 2012	1 October 2012	6	10:30pm	N/A
2	4 October 2013	8 November 2013	6	9:30pm	+1 Christmas special
3	31 October 2014	12 December 2014	6	8:30pm	+1 Christmas special
4	30 October 2015	11 December 2015	6	8:30pm/7:30pm	+1 Christmas special
5	4 November 2016	23 December 2016	6	8:30pm	+1 Christmas special

== Characters ==
The main cast of series 5 (left to right): Naani, Mo Malik, Amjad Malik, Mr. Khan, Shazia Khan, Mrs Khan, Nadiya Malik and Alia Khan

- Episode count is as of 23 December 2016 (Series 5, Episode 7)

Character	Actor	Description	Years	Series	Episode count
Mr Khan	Adil Ray	The iron-fisted, loud-mouthed, and stereotypically Pakistani man of the Khan household. While at his heart a loving man who is respected among his peers, he is clumsy, prone to lying, and often uses those around him as a means to his own end. Episodes usually conclude in his lies being unravelled after he complexifies his situations through his own selfishness. He is also heavily racist, especially towards Indians, and is a notorious cheapskate. His catchphrases are "They all know me!", "Oh, twaddi..." (Oh no), and "Chup!" (Quiet!).	2012–16	1.1–5.7	34
Mrs Razia Khan	Shobu Kapoor	Mr Khan's long-suffering wife, who desperately worries how her husband's actions will affect their families' image among the Sparkhill Muslim community. She is usually the last to find out about her husband's antics and unfailingly scolds him when she discovers the things he has done. Nevertheless, she loves her husband and enjoys regaling stories about their marriage to their daughters Alia and Shazia.	2012–16	1.1–5.7	33
Alia Khan	Bhavna Limbachia	The Khans' youngest and Mr Khan's favourite daughter, who feigns being a good and devout Muslim to hide her stereotypical teenager lifestyle. She often uses this image to swindle money from her father to fund glamorous clothing and nights out, and is almost always seen on her phone.	2012–16	1.1–5.7	34
Shazia Khan/ Shazia Malik	Maya Sondhi	The Khans' eldest daughter, who throughout the early series was preparing to be married, and later was married, to Amjad. She is level-headed and sensible, and often the voice of reason in the Khan household. She stands up for herself against her father more than her sister does, which results in Shazia being Mr Khan's lesser favourite daughter.	2012–14	1.1–3.7	20
Shazia Khan/ Shazia Malik	Krupa Pattani	The Khans' eldest daughter, who throughout the early series was preparing to be married, and later was married, to Amjad. She is level-headed and sensible, and often the voice of reason in the Khan household. She stands up for herself against her father more than her sister does, which results in Shazia being Mr Khan's lesser favourite daughter.	2015–16	4.1–5.7	14
Amjad Malik	Abdullah Afzal	Shazia's fiancé and eventual husband. Despite being aloof and not very bright, he is passionate about doing what is right for those he cares about. He is emotionally sensitive and often shown partaking in activities not traditionally associated with masculine Muslim men, such as baking or watching musicals.	2012–16	1.1–5.7	34
Riaz	Nish Nathwani	One of the regulars at Sparkhill Jamiya Mosque, often seen with Omar, either of the Daves, and Mr Khan. He often naively becomes an enabler of Mr Khan's problematic plans due to his unassuming nature.	2012–16	1.1–5.7	27
Mrs Malik	Harvey Virdi	Amjad's mother and eventual sister-in-law to Mr and Mrs Khan. She is sarcastic, bitter, and often in fierce competition with Mrs Khan, whom she is sceptical of, and constantly seeks to appear better than her to the rest of the community.	2012–16	1.1–5.7	14
Naani	Adlyn Ross	Mrs Khan's aging mother, who is often shown visiting the Khans from her native Pakistan to the disgruntlement of Mr Khan. Despite her daughter's insistence on her delicate caretaking, she is often independently determinate and - against Mrs Khan's wishes - keen to return to Pakistan, calling Birmingham a "shithole". She speaks almost entirely in Urdu.	2012–16	1.2–5.7	15
Dave 1	Kris Marshall	The new manager at Sparkhill Jamiya Mosque, who appears through season 1. He is a white Muslim convert who is often ridiculed by Mr Khan for being ginger. Despite this, he is often the voice of reason in any situations ongoing at the mosque.	2012	1.1–1.6	6
Dave 2 (Dave Prentice)	Matthew Cottle	The replacement mosque manager from the start of season 2 onwards. Like his previous Dave predecessor, he is mocked by Mr Khan for being white and ginger.	2013–16	2.2–5.7	16
Keith	Phil Nice	The next-door neighbour of the Khan family. Despite his cheery attitude and friendliness to his neighbours, he often does not receive the same level of respect back from Mr Khan.	2012–2014, 2016	1.5–3.7, 5.7	12
Omar	Felix Dexter	One of the regulars at the mosque, and often seen with Riaz. He is a Somalian immigrant who enjoys telling stories and anecdotes from his homeland. His kind and cheerfully innocent nature often juxtaposes the messy situations that Mr Khan creates.	2012–13	1.1–2.7	13

== Ratings ==
Total viewers include overnight views plus views on BBC iPlayer, BBC HD and recorded catch-up services. Official accurate figures are released 10 days after original transmission by BARB. For instance, Citizen Khan Series 2 Episode 1 attracted overall figures of 4.53m, a consolidated share of 15.1% including 1.17 million BBC iPlayer requests.

Series	Episode No	Airdate	Overnights (millions)	Share	BBC iPlayer requests	Source
1
1	1	27 August 2012	3.41	20.9%	852,000	
1	2	3 September 2012	2.78	19.3%	1,032,000	
1	3	10 September 2012	2.55	15.8%	865,000	
1	4	17 September 2012	2.29	16.4%	795,000	
1	5	24 September 2012	2.80	19.7%	—N/a	
1	6	1 October 2012	2.59	19.2%	660,000	
2
2	1	4 October 2013	2.94	14.3%	1,055,000	
2	2	11 October 2013	2.69	11.7%	854,000	
2	3	18 October 2013	2.66	13.0%	—N/a	
2	4	25 October 2013	2.85	14.1%	—N/a	
2	5	1 November 2013	2.86	13.9%	—N/a	
2	6	8 November 2013	2.31	10.8%	745,000	
2	7	20 December 2013	3.07	14.6%	843,000	
3
3	1	31 October 2014	2.86	13.5%	978,000	
3	2	7 November 2014	3.05	14.0%	—N/a	
3	3	21 November 2014	2.78	12.7%	—N/a	
3	4	28 November 2014	2.48	11.6%	—N/a	
3	5	5 December 2014	2.95	13.5%	737,000	
3	6	12 December 2014	2.71	12.4%	—N/a	
3	7	19 December 2014	2.92	14.2%	—N/a	
4
4	1	30 October 2015	3.33	17.5%	—N/a	
4	2	6 November 2015	2.64	12.9%	671,000	
4	3	20 November 2015	3.05	14.8%	—N/a	
4	4	27 November 2015	2.52	12.2%	—N/a	
4	5	4 December 2015	2.24	10.8%	—N/a	
4	6	11 December 2015	2.34	11.7%	—N/a	
4	7	18 December 2015	2.73	13.9%	—N/a	
5
5	1	4 November 2016	2.88	13.8%	785,000	
5	2	11 November 2016	2.77	12.7%	—N/a	
5	3	25 November 2016	2.54	12.6%	—N/a	
5	4	2 December 2016	2.62	12.5%	—N/a	
5	5	9 December 2016	2.33	11.9%	—N/a	
5	6	16 December 2016	2.29	12.1%	—N/a	
5	7	23 December 2016	2.65	13.6%	—N/a	

== Distribution ==
=== DVD ===
Series	Release name	No. of discs	UK release date (region 2)	NZ release date (region 4)	AU release date (region 4)	Classification	Notes
1	Citizen Khan – Series 1	1	22 October 2012	3 April 2013	29 May 2013	PG	No extras.
2	Citizen Khan – Series 2	1	11 November 2013	4 June 2014	30 April 2014	12	No extras. Does not include Christmas Special.
3	Citizen Khan – Series 3	1	22 December 2014	TBA	TBA	PG	Includes 2013 Christmas Special, Deleted Scenes and Outtakes
1–3	Citizen Khan – Series 1–3	3	22 December 2014	TBA	TBA	12	Includes 2013 Christmas Special, Deleted Scenes and Outtakes
4	Citizen Khan – Series 4	1	21 December 2015	TBA	TBA	12	Includes 2014 Christmas Special and Outtakes
5	Citizen Khan – Series 5	1	16 January 2017	TBA	TBA	PG	2015 Christmas special, others TBA

=== Broadcasts ===
Premiering on 12 July 2013, the series airs on Comedy Central India in India. In the United Kingdom, reruns of the show air on Gold.

=== Digital ===
Series 1, 2 & 3 are available to buy on iTunes in both Standard Definition and High Definition, "A Khan Christmas" and "A Khan Family Christmas" have also been made available to buy.

Series 1 to 5 are available to stream on Amazon Prime and BBC iPlayer

== See also ==
These are programmes with a similar premise.

- Fresh Off the Boat
- The Family Law
- Kim's Convenience
- Brown Nation
- Goodness Gracious Me
- The Kumars at No. 42
- The Real McCoy (TV series)
