= Tyger Takes On... =

- Genre: Documentary
- Directed by: Moby Longinotto
- Starring: Tyger Drew-Honey
- Country of origin: United Kingdom
- Original language: English
- No. of series: 2
- No. of episodes: 5

Production
- Executive producers: Dominique Walker; Ash Atalla; Neil Calow
- Producer: Moby Longinotto
- Running time: 60 minutes
- Production company: Roughcut Television

Original release
- Network: BBC Three; BBC Three HD
- Release: 15 May 2014 – 19 November 2015

Tyger Takes On... is a British television documentary show shown on BBC Three which began airing on 15 May 2014. The show follows actor Tyger Drew-Honey as he explores life hardships that young people have to face. The first series contained three episodes, the show ended on 5 June 2014. Drew-Honey confirmed, during his appearance on Sunday Brunch in August 2014, that a second series of the show had been commissioned. The second series consisted of two episodes.

== Episodes ==
=== Series 1 ===
No. overall	No. in series	Title	Directed by	Original release date
1	1	"Porn"	Moby Longinotto	15 May 2014
Tyger investigates how porn is affecting young people in today's society.
2	2	"The Perfect Body"	James W. Newton	22 May 2014
Tyger wants to find out if there is a pressure for men to look as good as women.
3	3	"Love"	Sam Wilkinson	5 June 2014
Tyger investigates if online dating is the answer to finding love in today's world.

=== Series 2 ===
No. overall	No. in series	Title	Directed by	Original release date
4	1	"How Straight Am I?"	Gavin Searle	12 November 2015
Tyger meets some of the trailblazers who are forging a brave new world of sexual expression amidst a backdrop of elite sex parties and the nu-drag scene, as he tries to be open-minded about his own sexuality.
5	2	"Am I Sexist?"	Jenny Dames	19 November 2015
Tyger explores the battle of the sexes, visiting some of the battlegrounds on which it is being fought, and treading the minefield of sexism from the mating game and universities to politics. Tyger questions whether he is part of the problem.

== Broadcast ==
The series premiered in Australia on 5 August 2015 on BBC Knowledge.
