= TBI Solicitors =

Law firms of the United Kingdom

Tilly Bailey & Irvine Law Firm
- Headquarters: Hartlepool, United Kingdom
- No. of offices: 6
- No. of attorneys: 70
- Major practice areas: General practice
- Key people: Carolyn Tilly (managing partner)
- Date founded: 1842
- Founder: Edward Turnbull
- Company type: Limited liability partnership
- Website: www.tbilaw.co.uk

Tilly Bailey & Irvine LLP (Tilly Bailey & Irvine Law Firm) is a regional law firm headquartered in Hartlepool, United Kingdom since 1842. It is the largest law firm in the Tees Valley, and one of the largest law firms in the North East of England. The firm has offices in Hartlepool, Stockton-on-Tees, Wynyard Park and Barnard Castle.

Tilly, Bailey & Irvine is a full-service legal firm employing over 150 staff, including 19 partners and 60 further fee-earners.

== History ==
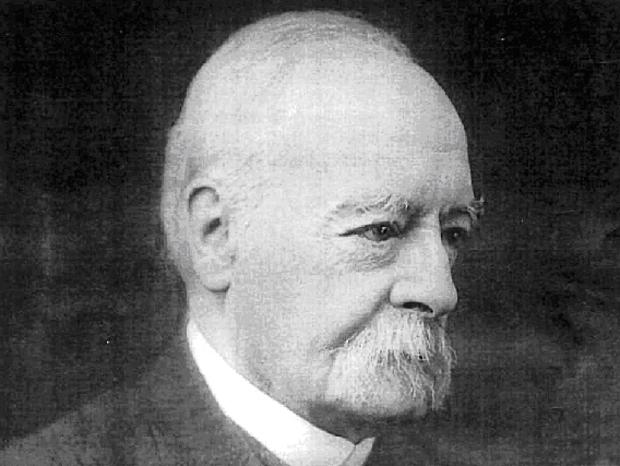
Tobias Harry Tilly Snr.

The firm can trace its roots to the Hartlepool practice of Edward Turnbull, established in 1842, which later formed the basis of a partnership with Tobias Harry Tilly. Turnbull & Tilly were Notaries Public largely dealing with shipmaster's claims. Tilly took his eldest son into the partnership and the firm continued until Tilly senior's death in 1932. The firm was then expanded by amalgamation with two other local firms. As Temperley, Tilly & Hayward, it moved to larger offices in Church Street, opposite Turnbull's first premises.

In 1949 Mr JB Irvine, the son of a West Hartlepool timber merchant, entered into partnership with FWJ Webb. Mr Webb had been practicing with Edward Fryer, a firm established in 1897. As Fryer, Webb & Irvine, the new partnership continued until 1955 when it amalgamated with Harry Bailey & Son, becoming Webb, Bailey & Irvine. The latter practice worked in association with Temperley, Tilly & Hayward amalgamating in 1969.

By 1994 The Lawyer magazine reported that the firm had the 34th largest family law department in England. In 1995 the firm merged with Bolsover, Manning, Scott and Co of Stockton to form one of the biggest legal firms in the north-east with 130 staff. In December 2000 the firm closed its Darlington branch. The Wynyard branch was opened in 2007 to handle business law after the Stockton branch business workload doubled during the previous two years.

By 2009, the firm employed 180 people. It provides a wide range of services to private clients in areas such as clinical negligence, family law, personal injury, and conveyancing; and to business clients in areas such as corporate law, commercial property law, commercial disputes, and intellectual property law.

== Sponsorship and charity ==
In 2009, Tilly Bailey & Irvine Solicitors won the One NorthEast award for Business in Sport in the Northern Echo's "Local Heroes" awards. The award recognised Tilly Bailey & Irvine Solicitors' sponsorship of local sporting teams and clubs, as well as of individual competitors. Tilly Bailey & Irvine Solicitors' sport sponsorships include Stockton Town FC, Stockton Cricket Club and, previously, Hartlepool United Football Club, as well as assisting the likes of Hartlepool Golf Club, Seaton Carew Cricket Club, Barnard Castle Cricket Club, Hartlepool Cricket Club. and Castle Eden cricket club.

Apart from sport, the firm sponsors the prize for the service sector in the Hartlepool Business Awards and has raised money for many local charities, raising almost £2,300 for Alzheimer's Research UK and £5,000 for Alice House Hospice in 2018.

== Action against suspected file sharers ==
On 1 March 2010, Lord Clement-Jones criticised TBI Solicitors along with firm ACS:Law for tactics that they employed when accusing people of copyright infringement. He called TBI Solicitors "new entrants to the hall of infamy" and their activities "an embarrassment to the rest of the creative rights industry".

On 3 March, UK consumer rights website Which? reported complaints by people who had received letters from TBI Solicitors accusing them of illegally sharing files of pornographic material that belongs to Golden Eye (International). TBI Solicitors threatened legal action against the letters' recipients unless they paid £700 compensation within fourteen days of the date of the letter. On 9 March, Which? reported an undertaking by Lord Young that the government would keep watch on ACS:Law and TBI Solicitors. Which? also asked the Solicitors Regulation Authority (SRA) to investigate whether sending these letters breached the Solicitors Code of Conduct (SCoC).

On 1 April, TBI Solicitors notified the SRA that the firm would discontinue sending these letters. In its letter, TBI Solicitors stated that they had been "surprised and disappointed" by the time and resources required to manage the adverse publicity that their activities had attracted, and were "concerned" that this adverse publicity could affect other areas of their business. Deborah Prince, head of the Which? in-house legal team believed that TBI Solicitors had indeed breached the SCoC, but TBI solicitors denied this in their letter to the SRA, stating that the decision was "based on purely commercial reasons and does not alter our view that our conduct has always complied with the Solicitors Code of Conduct."

Later that month TBI said it would end its campaign. John Hall, managing partner at Tilly, Bailey & Irvine Solicitors said in a statement, "We have been surprised and disappointed by the amount of adverse publicity that our firm has attracted in relation to this work. Following discussions with our clients we have reluctantly agreed that we will cease sending out further letters of claim." Hall added that the firm was "delighted to be able to dispose of this matter in a way that makes it clear that the firm has never acted with any conscious or deliberate impropriety".
