= Maya Sondhi =

British actress and screenwriter

Maya Sondhi (born c. 1983) is a British actress and screenwriter. She was born in Birmingham, England. She attended the National Youth Theatre before going on to study at LAMDA. She is the creator and writer of D.I Ray. As an actress she has appeared in Line of Duty and Citizen Khan.

== Television ==
Year	Title	Role	Broadcaster	Ref
2002	Brum	Firewoman	BBC One/CBeebies	
2005	Family Affairs	Shireen Taymour	Channel 5	
2005	Judge John Deed	Carole	BBC One	
2005, 2008	The Bill	Mariza/Kim Law	ITV	
2006	Fair City	Sholeh Tenniz	RTÉ One	
2006, 2016	Silent Witness	Rosa Cassalle/DC Shona Clarke	BBC One	
2007, 2009, 2014	Casualty	Carly Grahame/Ravinder Theara/Anita Johar	BBC One	
2008	Doctors	Gina Saunders	BBC One	
2009	Collision	Nurse	ITV/STV/UTV	
2012–2014	Citizen Khan	Shazia Khan / Shazia Malik	BBC Two	
2015	Professor Branestawm Returns	Radio Producer	BBC One	
2016	DCI Banks	Christine Farinelli	ITV	
2016–2019	Line of Duty	Maneet Bindra	BBC One/BBC Two	
2018	The Split	Dawn McKenzie	BBC One	
2018	Midsomer Murders	Aisha Khalique	ITV	
2021–2025	The Adventures of Paddington	Dr. Yasmine Kamali	Gulli	

== Screenwriting ==
Year	Title	Episodes	Broadcaster
2014	The Kumars at No. 42	4 episodes	BBC Two
2016	EastEnders	2 episodes	BBC One
2016	Mount Pleasant	1 episode	Sky One
2017	The Break	1 episode	BBC Three
2018	Ackley Bridge	1 episode	Channel 4
2022-2024	DI Ray	8 episodes	ITV
