= List of horror films of 1983 =

A list of horror films released in 1983.

Title	Director(s)	Cast	Country	Notes	Ref.
American Nightmare	Don McBrearty	Lawrence Day, Michael Ironside, Lora Staley	Canada		
Amityville 3-D	Richard Fleischer	Tony Roberts, Tess Harper, Lori Loughlin	United States		
A Blade in the Dark	Lamberto Bava	Andrea Occhipinti, Anna Papa, Fabiola Toledo	Italy		
Boogeyman II	Ulli Lommel, Bruce Starr	Rhonda Aldrich, Shoto von Douglas, Shannah Hall	United States		
Christine	John Carpenter	John Stockwell, Alexandra Paul, Keith Gordon	United States		
Cujo	Lewis Teague	Dee Wallace, Danny Pintauro, Daniel Hugh Kelley	United States		
Curtains	Richard Ciupka	John Vernon, Samantha Eggar, Linda Thorson	Canada		
The Deadly Spawn	Douglas McKeown		United States		
Death Warmed Up	David Blyth	Michael Hurst, Margaret Umbers, William Upjohn	Australia; New Zealand	Alternative title(s): Death Warmed Over	
Le Démon dans l'île	Francis Leroi	Anny Duperey, Jean-Claude Brialy, Pierre Santini	France		
The Demon Murder Case	William Hale	Charles Fields, Joyce Van Patten, Kevin Bacon	United States	Television film	
The Demons of Ludlow	Bill Rebane	Paul von Hausen, Stephanie Cushna	United States		
The Devonsville Terror	Ulli Lommel	Suzanna Love, Paul Willson, Donald Pleasence	United States		
Dracula Tan Exarchia	Nikos Zervos	Konstantinos Tzoumas, Vangelis Kotronis	Greece		
Eyes of Fire	Avery Crounse	Dennis Lipscomb, Guy Boyd, Rebecca Stanley	United States	Alternative title(s): Cry Blue Sky	
The Final Terror	Andrew Davis	Rachel Ward, Adrian Zmed, Daryl Hannah	United States	Alternative title(s): Campsite Massacre; Carnivore	
Frightmare	Norman Thaddeus Vane	Barbara Pilavin, Leon Askin, Jennifer Starrett	United States		
Grizzly II: Revenge	Joseph Ford Proctor	Steve Inwood	United States	Sequel to Grizzly (1976)	
Hansel and Gretel	Tim Burton		United States	TV film	
House of the Long Shadows	Pete Walker	Vincent Price, Christopher Lee	United Kingdom		
The Hunger	Tony Scott	Catherine Deneuve, David Bowie, Susan Sarandon	United Kingdom		
Jaws 3-D	Joe Alves	Dennis Quaid, Bess Armstrong, Simon MacCorkindale	United States	Third film of Jaws franchise	
Julie Darling	Paul Nicholas	Anthony Franciosa, Sybil Danning	Canada; West Germany		
The Keep	Michael Mann	Scott Glenn, Alberta Watson, Ian McKellen	United Kingdom		
The Killing of Satan	Efren C. Piñon	Ramon Revilla, Elizabeth Oropesa	Philippines		
Mausoleum	Michael Dugan	Bobbie Bresee, Marjoe Gortner, Norman Burton	United States		
Mongrel	Robert A. Burns	Janis Dickerson, John Dodson, Terry Evans	United States		
Mortuary	Howard Aveids	Mary Beth McDonough, David Wallace, Bill Paxton	United States	Alternative title(s): Embalmed	
Mountaintop Motel Massacre	Jim McCullough Sr.	Anna Chappell, Amy Hill	United States		
A Night to Dismember	Doris Wishman	Samantha Fox	United States		
Nightmares	Joseph Sargent	Cristina Raines, Emilio Estevez, Veronica Cartwright	United States		
Of the Flesh	Marilou Diaz-Abaya	Charito Solis, Phillip Salvador, Vic Silayan, Joel Torre, Cecille Castillo	Philippines		
Of Unknown Origin	George P. Cosmatos	Peter Weller, Jennifer Dale	United States; Canada		
Ogroff	N. G. Mount	Howard Vernon	France	Alternative title(s): Mad Mutilator	
Olivia	Ulli Lommel	Suzanna Love, Robert Walker Jr.	United States	Alternative title(s): Double Jeopardy; Prozzie; Taste of Sin	
One Dark Night	Tom McLoughlin	Meg Tilly, Melissa Newman	United States		
Panic Beats	Paul Naschy		Spain		
The Prey	Edwin Brown	Debbie Thureson, Steve Bond	United States		
Psycho II	Richard Franklin	Anthony Perkins, Vera Miles, Robert Loggia, Meg Tilly	United States	Second film of Psycho franchise	
Scalps	Fred Olen Ray	Kirk Alyn, Carroll Borland, Jo Ann Robinson	United States		
Screamtime	Michael Armstrong, Stanley A. Long	Vincent Russo, Michael Gordon, Marie Scinto	United Kingdom		
Skullduggery	Ota Richter	Thom Haverstock, Wendy Crewson	Canada		
Sledgehammer	David A. Prior	Ted Prior, Linda McGill	United States		
Sleepaway Camp	Robert Hiltzik	Mike Kellin, Karen Fields, Felissa Rose	United States		
Sole Survivor	Thom Eberhardt	Anita Skinner, Kurt Johnson	United States		
Something Wicked This Way Comes	Jack Clayton	Jonathan Pryce, Diane Ladd, Pam Grier	United States		
Spasms	William Fruet	Peter Fonda, Oliver Reed, Kerrie Keane	Canada	Alternative title(s): Death Bite	
Sweet Sixteen	Jim Sotos	Bo Hopkins, Susan Strasberg	United States		
Twilight Zone: The Movie	John Landis, Steven Spielberg, Joe Dante, George Miller	Vic Morrow, Kathleen Quinlan, Scatman Crothers, John Lithgow	United States		
Videodrome	David Cronenberg	James Woods, Debbie Harry, Sonja Smits	Canada		
Zeder	Pupi Avati	Gabriele Lavia, Anne Canovas, Cesare Barbetti	Italy		

== Sources ==
- Albright, Brian (2008). Wild Beyond Belief!: Interviews with Exploitation Filmmakers of the 1960s and 1970s. Jefferson, North Carolina: McFarland. ISBN 978-0-786-48250-4.
- Albright, Brian (2012). Regional Horror Films, 1958-1990: A State-by-State Guide with Interviews. Jefferson, North Carolina: McFarland. ISBN 978-1-476-60042-0.
- Chibnall, Steve; Petley, Julian, eds. (2002). British Horror Cinema. New York City, New York: Routledge. ISBN 978-0-415-23003-2.
- Hardy, Phil, ed. (1995). The Overlook Film Encyclopedia. Vol. 3. Overlook Press. ISBN 0-87951-624-0.
- Harper, Jim (2004). Legacy of Blood: A Comprehensive Guide to Slasher Movies. Manchester, England: Critical Vision. ISBN 978-1-900-48639-2.
- Heller-Nicholas, Alexandra (2011). Rape-Revenge Films: A Critical Study. McFarland. ISBN 978-0-7864-4961-3.
- Kay, Glenn (2012). Zombie Movies: The Ultimate Guide (2nd ed.). Chicago, Illinois: Chicago Review Press. ISBN 978-1-613-74425-3.
- Kerekes, David; Slater, David (2005). See No Evil: Banned Films and Video Controversy. London, England: Headpress. ISBN 978-1-900-48610-1.
- Muir, John Kenneth (2010). Horror Films of the 1980s. Jefferson, North Carolina: McFarland. ISBN 978-0-786-45501-0.
- Pitts, Michael R. (2013). Western Movies: A Guide to 5,105 Feature Films (2nd ed.). Jefferson, North Carolina: McFarland. ISBN 978-0-786-46372-5.
- Pratley, Gerald (2003). A Century of Canadian Cinema: Gerald Pratley's Feature Film Guide, 1900 to the Present. Toronto, Ontario: Lynx Images. ISBN 978-1-894-07321-9.
- Rockoff, Adam (2016) [2002]. Going to Pieces: The Rise and Fall of the Slasher Film, 1978–1986. Jefferson, North Carolina: McFarland. ISBN 978-0-786-49192-6.
- Shelley, Peter (2012). Australian Horror Films, 1973-2010. Jefferson, North Carolina: McFarland. ISBN 978-0-786-46167-7.
- Sipos, Thomas M. (2010). Horror Film Aesthetics: Creating the Visual Language of Fear. Jefferson, North Carolina: McFarland. ISBN 978-0-786-44972-9.
- Stanley, John (1988). Revenge of the Creature Features Movie Guide: An A to Z Encyclopedia to the Cinema of the Fantastic, or, Is There a Mad Doctor In the House?. Pacifica, California: Creatures at Large Press. ISBN 0-940064-04-9.
- Stine, Scott Aaron (2003). The Gorehound's Guide to Splatter Films of the 1980s. Jefferson, North Carolina: McFarland. ISBN 978-0-786-41532-8.
- Waller, Gregory Albert, ed. (1987). American Horrors: Essays on the Modern American Horror Film. Urbana, Illinois: University of Illinois Press. ISBN 978-0-252-01448-2.
- Young, R. G. (2000). The Encyclopedia of Fantastic Film: Ali Baba to Zombies. Hal Leonard Corporation. ISBN 1-55783-269-2.
