= Bogeyman (disambiguation) =

The bogeyman is a legendary monster.

Bogeyman, boogeyman, or boogieman may also refer to:

== People ==
- The Boogeyman (wrestler) (born 1964), ring name of American professional wrestler Martin Wright
- Albert Fish (1870–1936), an American serial killer sometimes referred to as "The Boogeyman"
- Derek Boogaard (1982–2011), a Canadian professional hockey player, nicknamed "The Boogeyman" because of his surname

== Fictional characters ==
- Bogeyman (Ghostbusters), a fictional character from the TV show The Real Ghostbusters
- Michael Myers (Halloween), the killer in the Halloween film series
- Pyramid Head, a monster from the video game series Silent Hill, is referred to as the Boogeyman in Silent Hill: Homecoming
- John Wick, the protagonist of the self-titled franchise, referred to as Baba Yaga (the Boogeyman) or "the one you sent to kill the f*cking Boogeyman".

== Books ==
- "The Boogeyman" (short story), a 1973 short story by Stephen King
- The Bogie Man (comics), a comic book series

== Film ==
- The Bogeyman (1953 film), a West German comedy film directed by Carl Boese
- The Boogeyman (1980 film), a 1980 horror film, released in the United Kingdom as The Bogey Man
  - Boogeyman II, a 1983 horror film, banned in the United Kingdom, under the title, Revenge of the Bogey Man
  - Return of the Boogeyman, a 1994 horror film, also known as Boogeyman III
- Disney Boogeyman Films
  - Mr. Boogedy (short film), a 1986 short film
  - Bride of Boogedy (film), a 1987 film sequel to Mr. Boogedy
- Boogeyman (film), a 2005 horror film
  - Boogeyman 2, a 2007 horror film
  - Boogeyman 3, a 2008 horror film
- The Boogeyman (2023 film), a 2023 horror film
- Boogie Man: The Lee Atwater Story, a 2008 documentary

== Television ==
- "Boogeyman" (My Name Is Earl), a 2006 episode
- "Boogieman" (Law & Order), a 2008 episode
- "The Boogieman" (Quantum Leap), a 1990 episode

== Music ==
- "Boogie Man," a song by Sid Phillips
- "The Boogie Man," by The Jackson 5 on their 1973 album Skywriter
- "Bogey Man" / "The Bogeyman," a 1976 song by Mike Harding
- "Boogie Man" (Aerosmith song), 1993
- "Boogie Man" (AC/DC song), 1995
- "Bogey Man," a 2000 song by John Entwistle on his album Music from Van-Pires
- "Boogieman," a 2016 song by Childish Gambino
- "Boogieman Sam," a 2019 song by King Gizzard and the Lizard Wizard
- "Boogieman" (Ghali song), 2020
- "Boogeyman", a 2022 song by DaBaby from Baby on Baby 2
- "Boogieman" (EBK Jaaybo song), 2024

== See also ==
- Bogey (disambiguation)
- Boogie (disambiguation)
