= BrainWaves =

- Theatrical release poster
- Directed by: Ulli Lommel
- Written by: Ulli Lommel; Suzanna Love
- Produced by: Ulli Lommel
- Starring: Suzanna Love; Keir Dullea; Vera Miles; Tony Curtis; Percy Rodriguez; Paul Willson; Corinne Wahl
- Cinematography: Jon Kranhouse
- Edited by: Richard S. Brummer
- Music by: Robert O. Ragland
- Production company: CinAmerica
- Distributed by: Motion Picture Marketing
- Release date: November 19, 1982
- Running time: 77 minutes
- Country: United States
- Language: English
- Budget: $2.5 million
- Box office: $3,111

BrainWaves (Note: The film was also released in a truncated cut under the alternate title Shadow of Death, as well as Mind Games.) is a 1982 American science fiction thriller film co-written and directed by Ulli Lommel, and starring Keir Dullea, Suzanna Love, Vera Miles, Paul Willson, Percy Rodriguez, Tony Curtis, Corinne Wahl, and Eve Brent.

== Plot ==
A woman's brain function is restored by a computer, with dangerous consequences.

== Cast ==
- Keir Dullea as Julian Bedford
- Suzanna Love as Kaylie Bedford
- Vera Miles as Marian Koonan
- Ryan Seitz as Danny Bedford
- Percy Rodriguez as Dr. Robinson
- Paul Willson as Dr. Schroder
- Tony Curtis as Dr. Clavius
- Eve Brent as Miss Simpson
- Corinne Wahl as Leila Adams
- Nicholas Love as Willy Meiser

== Production ==
Principal photography occurred at the Pettis Memorial Veterans Administration Hospital in Loma Linda, California, with additional shooting taking place in San Francisco. Filming completed in April 1982.

== Release ==
=== Box office ===
BrainWaves was given a limited regional theatrical release through Motion Picture Marketing, opening on November 19, 1982, in Austin, Texas and Newport News, Virginia. It earned $3,111 during its theatrical run. It was released in 1983 under the alternate title Mind Games.

=== Critical response ===
Patrick Taggart of the Austin American-Statesman wrote of the film: "It is all absolute twaddle and would have been unbearable had there not been the elements of a murder mystery to keep us interested. Brainwaves is about one pulse away from being braindead." Henry Edgar of the Daily Press gave the film a mixed review, noting that "the idea is intriguing and offers potential for a true thriller. But the action plods so slowly you might fall asleep before you realize why a more skillful director could keep you awake all night with the same plot."

Time Out published a retrospective review in 2012, describing the film as "a black hole for fading stars in which Dr. Curtis kindly operates on the heroine (Love) who is in a coma after suffering a traumatic blow to the brain. The donor is a murder victim, unexpectedly supplying not only motor reflexes but memories, so that the poor recipient is soon being stalked herself."

=== Home media ===
Embassy Home Entertainment released BrainWaves on VHS in 1986. Image Entertainment released a DVD edition of the film in 2002.

== Sources ==
- Lentz, Harris M. (2001). Science Fiction, Horror & Fantasy Film and Television Credits: Filmography (Second ed.). Jefferson, North Carolina: McFarland. ISBN 978-0-786-40942-6.
