= Angkor: Cambodia Express =

1982 film

- Directed by: Lek Kitiparaporn
- Written by: Roger Crutchley; Kailan
- Story by: Gianfranco Coujoumdjian
- Produced by: Lek Kitaparaporn; Dick Randall
- Starring: Robert Walker Jr. Christopher George; Woody Strode; Nancy Kwan; Sorapong Chatree
- Cinematography: Roberto Forges Davanzati
- Edited by: Morris Goodyear
- Music by: Stelvio Cipriani
- Release date: 1982
- Language: English

Angkor: Cambodia Express (Italian: Cambogia Express, also known as Kampuchea Express) is a 1982 Thai-Italian adventure-action film produced and directed by Lek Kitiparaporn and starring Robert Walker Jr. and Christopher George.

== Premise ==
The film is set in Cambodia two years after the withdrawal of the United States. During the rule of Pol Pot, a journalist searches for his missing Vietnamese lover.

== Cast ==
- Robert Walker Jr. as Andrew Cameron
- Christopher George as MacArthur
- Woody Strode as Woody
- Nancy Kwan as Sue
- Sorapong Chatree as Montri
- Lui Leung Wai as Mitr Saren
- Nit Alisa as Mieng
- Suchao Pongwilai as Montri

== Release ==
The film was not released to American audiences until its video release in 1986.

== See also ==
- List of Italian films of 1982
- List of Thai films
