= Kennett Love =

American journalist

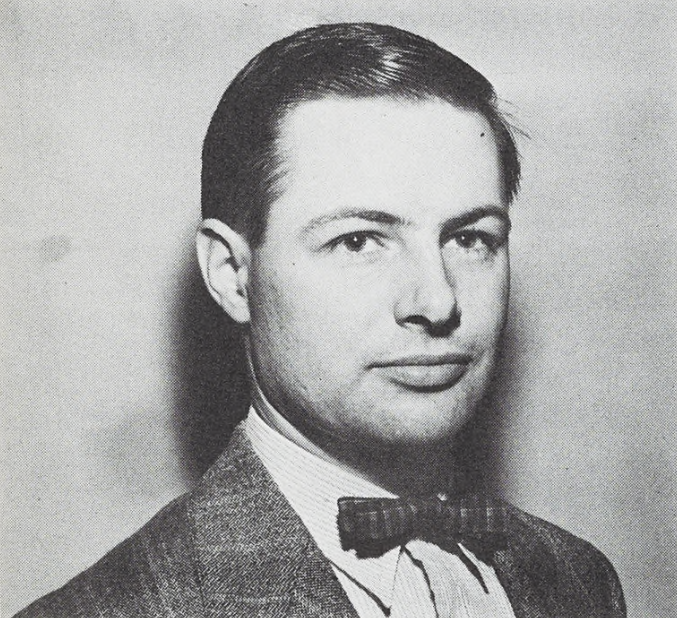
- Born: Kennett Farrar Potter Love; August 17, 1924; St. Louis, Missouri, U.S.
- Died: May 13, 2013 (aged 88); Southampton, New York, U.S.
- Education: Columbia University
- Occupation: Journalist
- Spouse(s): 1. Marie Felicité Pratt; 2. Melinda Elisabeth Reed; Blair Seagram (partner)
- Children: 4, including Suzanna Love

Kennett Farrar Potter Love (August 17, 1924 – May 13, 2013) was an American journalist for The New York Times.

== Early life ==
Love was born in St. Louis, Missouri on August 17, 1924, to Mary Chauncey (née Potter) Love and John Allan Love, founder of Prudential Savings of St. Louis.

He attended John Burroughs School and Princeton University, receiving an Associate in Arts degree, before serving (1943–1946) as a pilot in the Navy Air Corps during World War II.

In 1946, he married Marie Felicité Pratt (1926–2002), a granddaughter of John Teele Pratt and great-granddaughter of Charles Pratt, Pratt Institute founder, with whom he had two daughters, Mary and Suzanna, and two sons, John and Nicholas.

Love received a Bachelor of Arts degree from Columbia College in 1948.

== Career ==
In 1948, after finishing college, Love began working as a reporter for The Hudson-Dispatch, a newspaper in Union City, New Jersey before joining The New York Times in 1948, working in the morgue before becoming a newspaper reporter in 1950.

As a foreign correspondent, his assignments included coverage of activities in the Middle East, East Africa, West Africa and Europe.

In 1953, Love wrote about the CIA-orchestrated plot to overthrow Iran’s democratically elected prime minister. Love and a reporter for The Associated Press wrote about the decrees signed by Mohammad Reza Shah Pahlavi that called for Fazlollah Zahedi to replace Mohammad Mosaddegh. The release of the decrees, which helped legitimize the coup, was engineered by the CIA.

In 1954, when he was based in Cairo, Love wrote front-page articles about the discovery of a 50-foot boat that had been intended to convey the spirit of the pharaoh Cheops to the underworld.

In 1962, Love left The New York Times for the first national monthly news magazine, USA * 1: Monthly News & Current History, its editors included Lewis H. Lapham and Robert K. Massie.

Between 1963 and 1964, Love served as a Peace Corps Planner-Evaluator in Ethiopia, Morocco, Tunisia and in training centers in the United States.

Between 1964 and 1968, Love was an associate professor at Princeton University's School of Oriental Studies.

Between 1971 and 1973, Love was a professor of journalism at the American University in Cairo, and served as a Cairo correspondent for ABC News. Love was a correspondent and contributor for broadcaster CBS.

In 1974 Love began a career as a free-lance writer, editor and photographer.

In 1980, someone found a copy of Love’s 1960 term paper, for a professor at Princeton, in the sealed archives of Allen Dulles, and leaked it to CounterSpy, who accused Love of having been a CIA agent. He denied it.

In 1984, Love denied helping the CIA with the 1953 Iran coup, while working for The New York Times, suing Wall Street Journal reporter Jonathan Kwitny, until, at least, 1993. District Judge Mukasey found that Love's manuscript "suggested strongly that he may have played a role" in the coup.

Love was a contributor to the publications New York Times Magazine, Washington Monthly, and Middle East Journal, and others.

Love began research and interviews for a history of the 1953 coup in Iran.

== Bibliography ==
- Royalists Oust Mossadegh; Army Seizes Helm, The New York Times, August 20, 1953
- U.S. Envoy Lauds Egyptian Regime, The New York Times, December 6, 1954
- Jordan Pressure Denied By Britain, The New York Times, Jan 10, 1956
- The American Role in the Pahlevi Restoration: On 19 August 1953, 1960.

(unpublished manuscript submitted as a term paper (coursework) to a Princeton University professor while the Council on Foreign Relations Edward R. Murrow Press Fellow)

- The Allen Dulles Papers, Princeton University Library
- Box/Folder 359, Herbert Romerstein collection, Hoover Institution Archives, Stanford University

- Suez: The Twice-Fought War, a History. (New York and Toronto: McGraw Hill, 1969) ISBN 007038780X

== Awards ==
- eight-time winner of the Publisher's Writing Prize.
- 1959–1960 Edward R. Murrow Press Fellow, Council on Foreign Relations

== Personal life ==
Kennett Love was named for the surname of an ancestor, Congressman Luther Martin Kennett. Love's siblings were John Allan Love, Jr., Mary Lehmann, Deborah Deacon Pollock Matthiessen, Cynthia Brooks Roth, and Nathalie Chauncey Pierrepont Love. Deborah was the wife of novelist Peter Matthiessen. Love was a great-grandson of Episcopal Bishop Horatio Potter, descended from Rhode Island Colony founders Roger Williams (1603-1683) and William Arnold (1587-c.1676), and from Dr. Bernard Gaines Farrar (1784-1849) of St. Louis.

In 1946, Love married Marie Felicité Pratt, and in 1973, Melinda Elisabeth Reed, and his partner in his final decades was Blair Seagram.

Love was a sailor, who taught celestial navigation at the East Hampton Marine Museum. In 1983, sailed from Sag Harbor to Dark Harbor, Me., in an 18-ft. ketch-rigged open skiff. He made ocean voyages in the Mediterranean, Atlantic, Caribbean and Pacific in yachts.

Love designed several buildings, including a house in Sag Harbor and a house in East Hampton.

== Death ==
Kennett Love died on May 13, 2013, of a respiratory failure at his home in Southampton, New York, aged 88, survived by his daughters, Mary Christy Love Sadron and Suzanna Potter Love; two sons, John and Nicholas; two sisters, Mary Lehmann and Nathalie Love; a niece, Rue Matthiessen Shaughnessy; a nephew, Alex Matthiessen; and five grandchildren.
