= The Devonsville Terror =

- Promotional poster
- Directed by: Ulli Lommel
- Written by: George T. Lindsey; Ulli Lommel; Suzanna Love
- Produced by: Charles Aperia; Jochen Breitenstein; David Dubay; Ulli Lommel; Tim Nielsen; Bill Rebane
- Starring: Suzanna Love; Donald Pleasence; Robert Walker Jr.
- Cinematography: Ulli Lommel
- Edited by: Richard S. Brummer
- Music by: Ray Colcord
- Production company: New West Films
- Distributed by: Motion Picture Marketing; Embassy Pictures
- Release date: December 2, 1983 (New York City)
- Running time: 82 minutes
- Country: United States
- Language: English

The Devonsville Terror is a 1983 American supernatural horror film directed by Ulli Lommel and starring Suzanna Love, Donald Pleasence, and Robert Walker. The plot focuses on three different women who arrive in a conservative New England town, one of whom is the reincarnation of a witch who was wrongfully executed along with two others (Morrigan Hurt and Barbara Cihlar) by the town's founding fathers in 1683.

Inspired by the Salem Witch Trials, writer-director Lommel and his wife, actress Suzanna Love, co-wrote the screenplay for The Devonsville Terror with George T. Lindsey. The film was shot in Lincoln County, Wisconsin in 1983, and was intended for a theatrical release but instead was released directly to home video in October 1983 through Embassy Home Entertainment. The film received a theatrical exhibition for a single weekend in New York City in December 1983.

The Devonsville Terror went on to receive release through Anchor Bay Entertainment, who reissued the film in 1999 on both VHS as well as a double billing DVD paired with Lommel's The Boogeyman (1980). In 2016, a new edition was released on Blu-ray and DVD through the UK distributor 88 Films, followed by a North American Blu-ray release by Vinegar Syndrome in 2023. The film has been noted by some film scholars as an early example of a feminist-inspired horror film.

== Plot ==
On November 7, 1683 in Devonsville, Massachusetts, three women—Jessica Morley, Mary Pratt, and Rebecca Carson—are kidnapped by the townsfolk based on accusations of witchcraft. Jessica is disemboweled by hogs, and Mary is killed with a breaking wheel. Rebecca, the last to die, is burned at the stake. After Rebecca's execution, her apparition appears in the sky and a thunderstorm begins.

Three hundred years later, Devonsville remains a small, conservative farming community far from major cities. The killing of the three women as witches has become known as the Devonsville Inquisition. The local town doctor, Dr. Warley, is investigating the witches' purported curse on Devonsville; he also finds himself plagued by a bizarre illness in which worms crawl from his skin, an apparent curse linked to his ancestors' involvement in the inquisition. Meanwhile, three liberated, assertive women move to the town: Jenny Scanlon, the new schoolteacher; Chris, an environmental scientist; and Monica, a radio disc jockey. Their presence angers the town's bigoted patriarchs, among them Walter Gibbs, a middle-aged store owner who has recently murdered his sick wife, Sarah. While a medical examination shows that Sarah was killed rather than dying of natural causes, Dr. Warley provides a death certificate certifying natural causes so Walter can collect the insurance payout. Upon Jenny's arrival in town, she is greeted by brothers Ralph and Matthew Pendleton, both of whom are friendly. Later that night in his store, Walter witnesses an apparition of a nude Jenny. Ralph Pendleton meets with Dr. Warley for an annual checkup and Warley uses hypnosis to examine Ralph's links to the inquisition. Ralph states that his ancestor accused Jessica of witchcraft for spurning his sexual advances.

Jenny infuriates the local parents when she tells her class that God was considered a female in Babylonian times, and that God's representation as a father figure was introduced with Judaism. Chris is investigating the water quality at a local lake that the town's sewage dumps into. This causes the townspeople to fear that she will claim they are destroying the local environment. Monica hosts a radio call-in show where she often gives advice to female callers inquiring about relationship problems. This angers several men in the town who believe Monica is subverting their authority and corrupting local women with progressive ideas. Walter becomes romantically obsessed with Jenny, but she turns down his advances at his store one night. He then has a nightmare in which Jenny reveals to him that she knows that he murdered Sarah, before drowning him in a bog. Jenny visits Dr. Warley for her insomnia, and Warley suspects Jenny is one of the three witches reincarnated. Under hypnosis, Jenny states she is not a witch but actually a "messenger from the unknown."

Convinced that Jenny, Chris, and Monica are the witches reincarnated, Walter persuades a group including Matthew to kidnap each of the women one night. Chris is taken into the woods, bound and killed by hunting dogs, mirroring the death of Jessica. Monica is taken from her radio station and dragged behind a truck, mirroring the death of Mary. Jenny is kidnapped from her home and bound to a stake. The group recreates the Devonsville Inquisition and threatens to burn Jenny like Rebecca. However, Jenny unleashes her power, kills them all violently with a seemingly supernatural power and releases herself from her bindings. The next morning, Jenny boards a bus leaving Devonsville. A postscript intertitle from Dr. Warley's journal states that the curse has been lifted and the Devonsville terror is over.

== Cast ==
- Suzanna Love as Jennifer "Jenny" Scanlon
- Donald Pleasence as Dr. Warley
- Robert Walker Jr. (as Robert Walker) as Matthew Pendleton
- Paul Willson as Walter Gibbs
- Mary Walden as Chris
- Deanna Haas as Monica
- Michael Accardo as Ralph Pendleton
- William Dexter (as Bill Dexter) as Aaron Pendleton
- Priscilla Lowe as Myrtle Pendleton
- Angailica (as Angelica Rebane) as Angel Pendleton
- Morrigan Hurt as Jessica Morley
- Barbara Cihlar as Mary Pratt
- Leslie Smith as Rebecca Carson
- Joanna Andruss as Sarah Louise
- Wally Flaherty as Priest

== Analysis ==
Film scholar Heather Greene interprets The Devonsville Terror as a feminist-inspired horror film that uses the "accused woman construction" in which a woman accused of mal-intended witchcraft returns to seek vengeance, similar to The Crucible and Three Sovereigns for Sarah, reflecting a "certain trend toward expressing a feminist ethos." She adds: "Though not a polished film, The Devonsville Terror offers a loosely constructed commentary on contemporary gender politics. The male characters want to rid themselves of the progressive women. They are portrayed as murderous, lecherous, and gang-like, and are often showed gathering around a dinner table discussing their plans... Unlike most horror witch films, [in The Devonsville Terror] it is the men who are evil."

== Production ==
=== Development ===
The Devonsville Terror was written by Lommel and George T. Lindsey, and draws on numerous historical aspects of the witchcraft inquisition in the colonial era of the United States. Lommel stated that he had spent some time in Massachusetts and was inspired by the Salem Witch Trials. Star Suzanna Love, Lommel's wife, also helped write the film.

=== Filming ===
Principal photography took place in the fall of 1982 in Lincoln County, Wisconsin, in the city of Tomahawk. The historic Brickyard School in Merrill, Wisconsin, was also used as a filming location, and received a fresh coat of paint to its exterior funded by the production company. Filming also took place at The Studio Ranch, an independent film soundstage constructed for local film productions in Gleason. Filming was completed by mid-October 1982.

The film's special effects were created by makeup and effects artist Matthew Mungle.

== Release ==
The Devonsville Terror was given theatrical marketing through Motion Picture Marketing company (MPM) in 1983, though it never had a wide theatrical release. It screened for a single weekend at the ANCO Theater on 42nd Street in New York City beginning December 2, 1983.

The film was mentioned in a lawsuit regarding CinAmerica Pictures, a production company who falsely claimed to have produced the film (along with several other films by Lommel, including The Boogeyman and Olivia), with net profits of $150,000; however, according to the film's actual production company, New West Films, The Devonsville Terror had no net profit.

=== Home media ===
Embassy Pictures released the film on VHS in the United States October 1983. In the United Kingdom, it received a VHS release the same month through VTC Video.

Anchor Bay Entertainment re-released the film on VHS in 1999, along with a double-billing DVD paired with Lommel's The Boogeyman (1980). The UK distributor 88 Films released new region-free Blu-ray and DVD editions of the film on December 26, 2016. Vinegar Syndrome released a new Blu-ray edition, made available through their online store on February 14, 2023, ahead of a wide release scheduled for March 28, 2023.

== Reception ==
Donald C. Willis, writing in Horror and Science Fiction Films III (1981-1983) (1984), praised the film's cinematography as "exquisite" and described it as "a forthright anti-sexist terror film, which fact automatically makes it a shade more interesting than most similar, low-budget horror movies."

Brett H. from Oh the Horror! criticized the film's lack of sense, dialogue, but ultimately stated that the film was "a bit of a mess, but it’s ultimately a very amusing mess."

Stuart Galbraith of The Digital Bits, reviewing the film for its 2023 Blu-ray release, wrote favorably of it: "Unexpectedly good for such a cheap horror film, The Devonsville Terror eschews the early-'80s trend of teen-centric slasher films instead adopting a vaguely feminist approach with a tale laced in a repressive, moody atmosphere, underscoring a feeling of dread more akin to a handful early '70s British productions like The Blood on Satan's Claw and The Wicker Man, without ever being imitative of either film. It’s not exactly good and, indeed, a couple of moments are unintentionally hilarious, but there are plenty of interesting concepts and effectively creepy moments scattered throughout."

Reviewing it for Midwest Film Journal, Nick Rogers called the film "deeply silly and borderline incoherent" but noted that the film has "genuine concern for the way journalism, science and education remain similarly exploitable points of vulnerability in America—particularly among women in each respective field."

Steve Hutchison of the horror film review website Tales of Terror gave the film a mixed review, praising its cinematography, production value, dialogue, and performances, though he conceded "it’s never fun. The writers take detours with daunting subplots that have seemingly nothing to do with the premise. The Devonsville Terror couldn’t end early enough. It’s slow, disjointed, random."

== Sources ==
- Greene, Heather (2018). Bell, Book and Camera: A Critical History of Witches in American Film and Television. Jefferson, North Carolina: McFarland & Company. ISBN 978-1-476-63206-3.
- Sipos, Thomas M. (2010). Horror Film Aesthetics: Creating the Visual Language of Fear. Jefferson, North Carolina: McFarland & Company. ISBN 978-0-786-44972-9.
- Willis, Donald C. (1984). Horror and Science Fiction Films III (1981-1983), Volume 3. Lanham, Maryland: Scarecrow Press. ISBN 978-0-810-81723-4.
