= The Raven (2006 film) =

- DVD Release Cover (USA)
- Directed by: Ulli Lommel
- Written by: Ulli Lommel
- Produced by: Ulli Lommel; Jeff Frentzen; Nola Roeper
- Starring: Jillian Swanson; Jack Quinn; Sharon Senina; Michelle Guest
- Cinematography: Bianco Pacelli
- Edited by: Xgin; Brian Lawrence
- Music by: Robert J. Walsh
- Production companies: The Shadow Factory; Boogeyman Movies International
- Distributed by: Lions Gate Entertainment
- Release date: 2006
- Running time: 81 minutes
- Country: United States
- Language: English

The Raven is a 2006 American direct-to-video production horror film directed by Ulli Lommel and references the 1845 poem "The Raven" by Edgar Allan Poe. The DVD case cover art carries the title, Edgar Allan Poe's The Raven.

== Plot ==
Lenore as a child dreams of a man, who is evil, according to the nuns that work at the orphanage she lives at, with the flight attendant who is her adoptive grandfather. Her adoptive grandfather reads her poetry, but after his death she only reads "The Raven" by Edgar Allan Poe.

Years later, she is raped by the man she saw in her dreams, who is called Skinner, and then she kills him. After his death, he returns from hell as a supernatural murderer/raven. By this time, she has joined an LA band as the lead singer. Skinner slowly kills all of her band members. Skinner then finally proceeds to try murdering Lenore to have sex with the body, but Edgar Allan Poe returns from the dead and tells Skinner that Lenore is "his". This somehow stops Skinner, and then Poe and Lenore walk across a bridge. Then, the movie flashes back to the room she was in, and Skinner kills her this time.

== Cast ==
- Jillian Swanson as Lenore
- Jack Quinn as Skinner
- Victoria Ullmann as Annabel Lee
- Michelle Guest as Doree
- Sharon Senina as Jackie
- Tisha Franklin as Venecia
- Joella Mabusa as Nicole
- Willis Russell as Johnny
- Trista Beard as Loom
- Olivia Parrish as Terry

== Production ==
The Raven was filmed in the October 2005 and November 2005, for the most part in Marina Del Rey, California and Venice, California. A sequence was shot during a Halloween festival held along the Venice canals.

The recording studio sequences and the pool-side murder sequence were filmed at the San Fernando Valley home of Robert J. Walsh, who wrote the music for the film, including co-writing (with Lommel) the original song, "Dead of the Night." The house features an unusual guitar-shaped pool.

The various exterior scenes of Skinner in his mountaintop lair were filmed in the hills behind Malibu, California. Some of these scenes were reportedly directed by producer Jeff Frentzen.

The first victims of Skinner include a record executive (portrayed by producer Jeff Frentzen) and his assistant, portrayed by the film's editor, Brian Lawrence. One of the priests in the exorcism scene is portrayed by British film critic Calum Waddell.

The trained raven used in some scenes was named Oscar.
