= Strangers in Paradise (1984 film) =

- Video artwork
- Directed by: Ulli Lommel
- Written by: Ulli Lommel; Suzanna Love
- Produced by: David Dubay; Ulli Lommel
- Starring: Ulli Lommel; Suzanna Love
- Cinematography: Jürg Walther
- Edited by: Ron Norman
- Music by: William Pettyjohn
- Production company: New West Films
- Release date: 1984
- Running time: 84 minutes
- Country: United States
- Language: English

Strangers in Paradise is a 1984 American comedic science fiction musical film co-written, directed by, and starring Ulli Lommel.

The film was co-written by Lommel's wife, Suzanna Love, who also appears in the film as a punk singer.

== Plot ==
Mesmerist Jonathan Sage, a Adolf Hitler-lookalike who survives Nazi Germany by being cryogenically preserved, is to be thawed by fascist Americans who attempt to use him to rid their community of homosexuals, free-thinkers, and other "radicals".

== Cast ==
- Ulli Lommel as Jonathan Sage / Hitler
- Ken Letner as Staggers
- Thom Jones as Larry Larkin
- Cliff Brisbois as Ratcliffe
- Paul Murray as Dr. Tulip
- Gloria McCord as Irma
- Ann Price as Anita
- Bette Chapel as Helen
- Evakay Favia as Roxanne
- Richard Green as M.C.
- Suzanna Love as Sukey

== Production ==
Filming took place near Upland, California, in the summer of 1983. Additional photography occurred at Mt. Baldy Lodge and other locales in Rancho Cucamonga, California.
