= Olivia (1983 film) =

- European poster artwork
- Directed by: Ulli Lommel
- Written by: Ulli Lommel; John P. Marsh
- Produced by: Ulli Lommel; Gillian Gordon
- Starring: Suzanna Love; Robert Walker Jr.
- Cinematography: Jochen Breitenstein; Jon Kranhouse; Ulli Lommel; David Sperling; Jürg V. Walther
- Edited by: Terrell Tannen
- Music by: Joel Goldsmith
- Distributed by: Ambassador Films
- Release date: March 18, 1983 (U.S.)
- Running time: 84 minutes
- Country: United States
- Language: English

Olivia is a 1983 American psychological thriller film directed by Ulli Lommel and starring Suzanna Love and Robert Walker Jr. It follows a young wife in London who is suffering from homicidal schizophrenia, stemming from having witnessed her prostitute mother's murder. She meets an American engineer and has a brief but heated romance with him, and, several years later in Arizona, he encounters a woman who resembles her but claims not to remember him.

Co-written by Lommel and John Marsh, the screenplay was based on a short film Marsh had directed, which was adapted from a short story by the French writer Guy de Maupassant.

Internationally, Olivia was released under the alternate titles Prozzie and Double Jeopardy. In the United States, the film's distributor, Ambassador Films, released it under the alternate title A Taste of Sin.

== Plot ==
In London, five-year-old Olivia witnesses her prostitute mother's murder by one of her johns, a sadomasochistic American soldier. The soldier disposes of her mother's body by throwing it into the River Thames off the London Bridge.

Fifteen years later, Olivia is unhappily married to her domineering husband, Richard, who refuses to allow her to work. She is haunted by memories of her mother's death, and frequently hears her mother's voice guiding her to make decisions. While Richard is away at work one night, Olivia dresses herself provocatively and begins to walk the street as a prostitute. She is approached by a client, and returns to his home with him. There, she ties him up and recreates the scenario in which her mother was murdered before beating the man to death with a vase.

Meanwhile, Michael Grant, an American engineer from Los Angeles, is visiting London to perform restoration on the London Bridge. He encounters Olivia walking beneath the bridge, and invites her to his hotel for drinks. The two share an emotional connection and have passionate sex. The next day, when Olivia returns home, Richard rapes her. Olivia and Michael continue to carry on a secret affair, but are discovered by Richard on the London Bridge. In a scuffle, Richard is thrown over the railing into the river below, and a terrified Olivia flees.

Four years later, Michael has returned to the United States and is residing in Lake Havasu City, Arizona, where the dismantled pieces of the London Bridge have been reassembled to span the Colorado River. An upscale housing development has opened there and the region has begun to attract visitors. The local tourism is overseen by Jenny, a tourism ambassador who bears a striking resemblance to Olivia, but has brunette hair rather than blonde, and speaks with an American accent. Convinced that Jenny is in fact Olivia, Michael aggressively pursues her. When he implies that they have met before, she coyly denies it, but the two begin a passionate affair no less.

Jenny asks Michael to meet her on the bridge one morning, where she finally reveals she is in fact Olivia. The two carry on a blissful romance, but Michael begins to notice Olivia making vague references to her mother being "angry" with her, and hears her talking to herself. One night, before Olivia returns home, Michael is murdered by an unseen assailant in the bathroom, who impales him through the throat with a toothbrush. Olivia returns home and gets into bed with who she believes to be Michael, only to find it is in fact Richard, who survived his fall from the bridge in London and has followed her to the United States. He beats her before implying Michael is dead.

Several days later, a group of children boating in the river find Michael's corpse. Richard, meanwhile, forces himself back into Olivia's life, moving into her home and controlling her. One night in bed, as Richard attempts to initiate sex, Olivia stabs him to death with a butcher knife. She conceals his body in a steamer trunk and dumps it into the Colorado River beneath the bridge. As she watches the trunk sink into the water, Olivia reminisces of her mother reading her fairytales at bedtime, and telling her how one day she will find a prince.

== Cast ==
- Suzanna Love as Olivia / Jenny
  - Amy Robinson as Olivia, age 5
- Robert Walker Jr. as Michael Grant
- Jeff Winchester as Richard
- Bibbe Hansen as Mother
- Nicholas Love as the Soldier
- Kenneth R. Shippy as Eric
- Michael Evans as Chairman
- Ulli Lommel as the Detective

== Production ==
=== Development ===
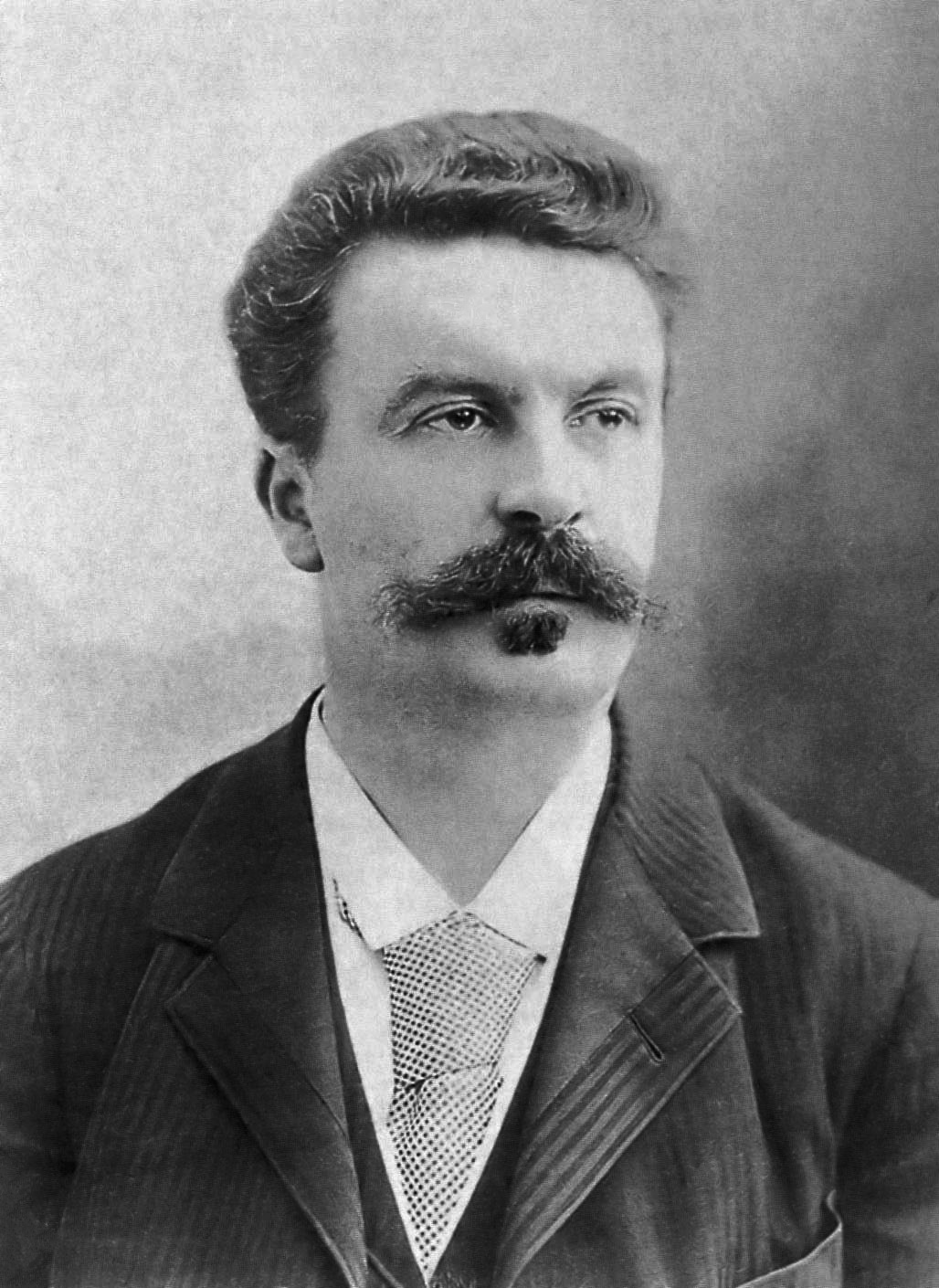
The film was partly adapted from a short film based on a story by the French writer Guy de Maupassant

Lommel and Love devised the idea for Olivia while intending to produce a sequel to The Boogeyman (1980). John P. Marsh, who met Lommel at a party in Santa Monica, California, originally co-wrote a screenplay for a sequel to Boogeyman II. While scouting locations for that project, Lommel, Marsh, and Love traveled through Mexico before passing through Lake Havasu City, Arizona, the location of the 17th-century former London Bridge which was disassembled and relocated from England to Arizona, where it was repurposed into a bridge spanning the Colorado River.

Lommel, fascinated by the bridge, asked Marsh to help write a screenplay centered around it. Marsh based the screenplay on Streamline Duchess, a short film he had written in college about a woman living in Eureka, California, who becomes drawn into a life of prostitution after watching local prostitutes congregate at a motel across the street from her home. Marsh had based this film on a short story by French writer Guy de Maupassant.

=== Filming ===
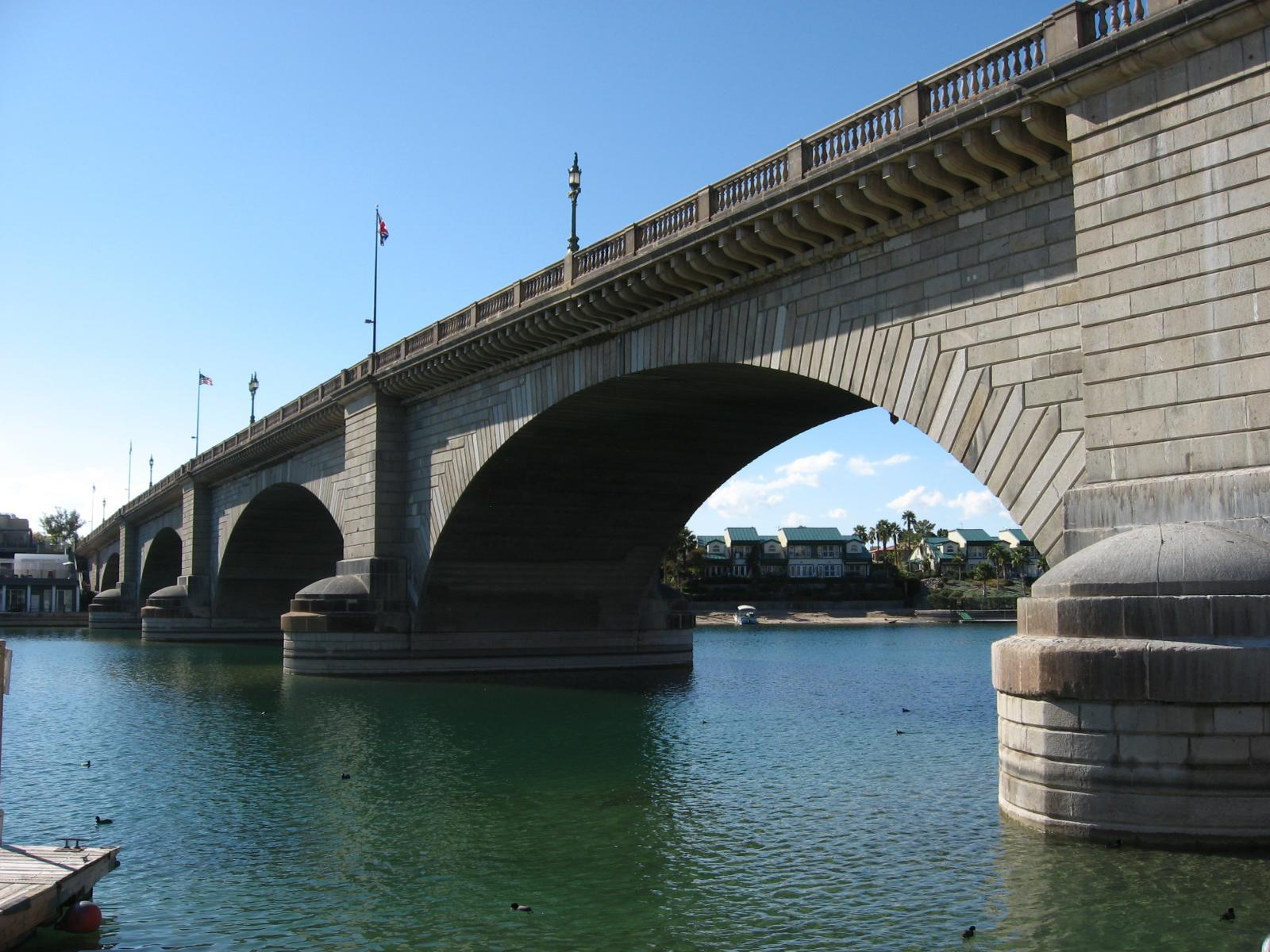
The London Bridge in Lake Havasu City, Arizona served as a primary film location and plot device

Principal photography of Olivia took place in both the United States and England, with the London-set exteriors being filmed on location, as well as the Lake Havasu-set exteriors being filmed on location in Arizona. During the shoot, the film had the working title Faces of Fear.

The majority of the interior sequences were filmed in Los Angeles, many inside Lommel's home. The interior of Olivia's London residence was shot in a Los Angeles apartment that the crew had rented for one day. According to co-writer and assistant director John P. Marsh, many sequences in the film—largely the interiors—were completed after filming had officially wrapped, as the production had recurrently run out of funding.

== Release ==
Olivia premiered theatrically in the United States under the title A Taste of Sin on March 18, 1983, opening in New York City and Los Angeles.

=== Critical response ===
Tom Sabulis of the Tampa Bay Times panned the film, calling it "extremely amateurish filmmaking... The photography, the clothes, and the sets are every bit as tawdry as the screenplay."

Film scholar Kim Newman wrote that Olivia is "a clever and pointed psychological thriller... Corpses are dumped into the Thames and the Colorado rivers, and the plots of Vertigo and Marnie are played with, but finally Olivia is inescapably drawn into the fairytale world beyond the bathroom mirror where her dead mother lives."

=== Home media ===
The film was released on Blu-ray in the United Kingdom by 88 Films in 2017. In April 2020, the American label Vinegar Syndrome released a Blu-ray and DVD combination pack of the film.

== Sources ==
- Franzen, Jeff (1998). "Ulli Lommel: Stranger in Paradise". Video Watchdog. Vol. 44. Cincinnati, Ohio: Starbrite. pp. 26–49. ISSN 1070-9991.
- Newman, Kim (2011). Nightmare Movies: Horror on Screen Since the 1960s. New York City, New York: Bloomsbury USA. ISBN 978-1-408-80503-9.
