= Young Slo-Be =

American rapper

- Also known as: Slo-Be; Slo-Be Bryant; Red Mamba
- Born: Disean Jaquae Victor; June 2, 1993; Stockton, California, U.S.
- Died: August 5, 2022 (aged 29) Manteca, California, U.S.
- Genres: West Coast hip-hop; Gangsta rap
- Occupation: Rapper
- Instrument: Vocals
- Years active: 2015–2022
- Label: Thizzler On The Roof

Disean Jaquae Victor (June 2, 1993 - August 5, 2022), known professionally as Young Slo-Be, was an American rapper from Stockton, California.

== Early life and career ==
Young Slo-Be was born on June 2, 1993, in Stockton, California, U.S. He began his recording career in 2010, and in 2015, he released a single, "Krosstown".

Young Slo-Be released his studio album, Southeast on June 24, 2022. The album helped him gain more attention, which in return made the media platform Pitchfork list the album on their "34 Great Records You May Have Missed" article. His single "I Love You" also went viral.

== Controversy ==
On November 4, 2013, Young Slo-Be was arrested in Stockton for possessing a loaded firearm and a concealed gun in his car along with his friend.

On 2019, He was charged with speeding in Arizona.

On June 11, 2022, Disean was arrested for possessing a loaded firearm that wasn't registered and charged with prohibited possession. He was also charged with speeding, false identification, false personation of another, driving while suspended and possessing ammunition.

== Death ==
On August 5, 2022, Young Slo-Be was shot at 8:17 AM on Trevino Avenue. He was taken to the hospital by the police but was declared dead at 29 years-old as a result of the injuries developed from the gunshots.

== Discography ==
=== Studio albums ===
Title	Album details
Slo-Be Bryant 3	Released: August 13, 2021; Label: KoldGreedy Entertainment / Thizzler On The Roof; Format: Digital download, streaming
Slo-Be Bryant 3 Deluxe	Released: March 18, 2022; Label: KoldGreedy Entertainment / Thizzler On The Roof; Format: Digital download, streaming
Southeast	Released: June 24, 2022; Label: KoldGreedy Entertainment / Thizzler On The Roof; Format: Digital download, streaming
Slo-Be Bryant 4	Released: October 25, 2024; Label: KoldGreedy Entertainment / Thizzler On The Roof; Format: Digital download, streaming

=== Mixtapes ===
Title	Mixtape details
2100 Shell Kases	Released: July 5, 2019; Label: Self-released; Format: Digital download, streaming
Slo-Be Bryant	Released: January 21, 2019; Label: Self-released; Format: Digital download, streaming
Borona	Released: April 1, 2020; Label: Self-released; Format: Digital download, streaming
Slo-Be Bryant 2	Released: July 24, 2020; Label: KoldGreedy Entertainment; Format: Digital download, streaming
Red Mamba	Released: March 26, 2021; Label: KoldGreedy Entertainment / Thizzler On The Roof; Format: Digital download, streaming
Nightmare On Seventh Street	Released: October 9, 2021; Label: KoldGreedy Entertainment / Thizzler On The Roof; Format: Digital download, streaming

=== Singles ===
Title	Single Details
"Hunnit Proof"	Released: October 22, 2018; Label: Koldgreedy Ent; Mixtape: Slo-Be Bryant; Format: Digital Download, streaming
"Sucka K"	Released: October 22, 2018; Label: Koldgreedy Ent; Mixtape: Slo-Be Bryant; Format: Digital Download, streaming
"Real Luv"	Released: November 22, 2019; Label: Koldgreedy Ent; Mixtape: 2100 Shell Kases; Format: Digital Download, streaming
"2100 Shell Kases"	Released: November 22, 2019; Label: Koldgreedy Ent; Mixtape: 2100 Shell Kases; Format: Digital Download, streaming
"Fantastik"	Released: April 1, 2020; Label: Self-released; Mixtape: Borona; Format: Digital Download, streaming
"Shit Talkin" (featuring Zaybang)	Released: April 1, 2020; Label: Self-released; Mixtape: Borona; Format: Digital Download, streaming
"Gettin Jiggy" (featuring Bris)	Released: July 24, 2020; Label: KoldGreedy Entertainment; Mixtape: Slo-Be Bryant 2; Format: Digital Download, streaming
"This Ain't Nun New" (featuring Bris, EBK Young Joc & EBK Juvie)	Released: July 24, 2020; Label: KoldGreedy Entertainment; Mixtape: Slo-Be Bryant 2; Format: Digital Download, streaming
"Don't Mean Nun"	Released: July 24, 2020; Label: KoldGreedy Entertainment; Mixtape: Slo-Be Bryant 2; Format: Digital Download, streaming
"G-Way"	Released: July 24, 2020; Label: KoldGreedy Entertainment; Mixtape: Slo-Be Bryant 2; Format: Digital Download, streaming
"Red Mamba"	Released: March 26, 2021; Label: KoldGreedy Entertainment; Mixtape: Red Mamba; Format: Digital Download, streaming
"21 Thoughts"	Released: March 26, 2021; Label: KoldGreedy Entertainment; Mixtape: Red Mamba; Format: Digital Download, streaming
"Ngh"	Released: March 26, 2021; Label: KoldGreedy Entertainment; Mixtape: Red Mamba; Format: Digital Download, streaming
"Slime Ball"	Released: March 26, 2021; Label: KoldGreedy Entertainment; Mixtape: Red Mamba; Format: Digital Download, streaming
"Shay Shay"	Released: March 26, 2021; Label: KoldGreedy Entertainment; Mixtape: Red Mamba; Format: Digital Download, streaming
"Stay On Point"	Released: October 29, 2021; Label: KoldGreedy Entertainment / Thizzler On The Roof; Mixtape: Nightmare On Seventh Street; Format: Digital Download, streaming
"Nightingale's Finest"	Released: October 29, 2021; Label: KoldGreedy Entertainment / Thizzler On The Roof; Mixtape: Nightmare On Seventh Street; Format: Digital Download, streaming
"2100 Shell Kases" (featuring EBK Young Joc and EBK Trey B)	Released: November 22, 2020; Label: KoldGreedy Ent; Mixtape: 2100 Shell Kases; Format: Digital Download, streaming
"Southeast Demons"	Released: June 24, 2021; Label: KoldGreedy Entertainment / Thizzler On The Roof; Mixtape: Slo-Be Bryant 3; Format: Digital Download, streaming
"So 2One" (featuring AO Melly)	Released: August 1, 2021; Label: KoldGreedy Entertainment / Thizzler On The Roof; Mixtape: Slo-Be Bryant 3; Format: Digital Download, streaming
"Double Dribble"	Released: August 1, 2021; Label: KoldGreedy Entertainment / Thizzler On The Roof; Mixtape: Slo-Be Bryant 3; Format: Digital Download, streaming
"No Names"	Released: August 1, 2021; Label: KoldGreedy Entertainment / Thizzler On The Roof; Mixtape: Slo-Be Bryant 3; Format: Digital Download, streaming
"The Association"	Released: August 1, 2021; Label: KoldGreedy Entertainment / Thizzler On The Roof; Mixtape: Slo-Be Bryant 3; Format: Digital Download, streaming
"I Love You"	Released: August 1, 2021; Label: KoldGreedy Entertainment / Thizzler On The Roof; Mixtape: Slo-Be Bryant 3; Format: Digital Download, streaming
"Pain Killer"	Released: August 1, 2021; Label: KoldGreedy Entertainment / Thizzler On The Roof; Mixtape: Slo-Be Bryant 3 Deluxe; Format: Digital Download, streaming
"Unforgiveable" (featuring Drakeo the Ruler)	Released: August 1, 2021; Label: KoldGreedy Entertainment / Thizzler On The Roof; Mixtape: Slo-Be Bryant 3; Format: Digital Download, streaming
"Black Heart Dead Rose"	Released: August 1, 2021; Label: KoldGreedy Entertainment / Thizzler On The Roof; Mixtape: Slo-Be Bryant 3 Deluxe; Format: Digital Download, streaming
"Stay On Point"	Released: October 2021; Label: KoldGreedy Entertainment / Thizzler On The Roof; Mixtape: Nightmare On Seventh Street; Format: Digital Download, streaming
"Ouweee" (featuring DaBoii)	Released: April 7, 2022; Label: KoldGreedy Entertainment / Thizzler On The Roof; Album: Southeast; Format: Digital Download, streaming
"Rock Out"	Released: May 19, 2022; Label: KoldGreedy Entertainment / Thizzler On The Roof; Album: Southeast; Format: Digital Download, streaming
"Hoodstar"	Released: April 7, 2022; Label: KoldGreedy Entertainment / Thizzler On The Roof; Album: Southeast; Format: Digital Download, streaming
"Muscle"	Released: April 7, 2022; Label: KoldGreedy Entertainment / Thizzler On The Roof; Album: Southeast; Format: Digital Download, streaming
"Track Stars"	Released: April 7, 2022; Label: KoldGreedy Entertainment / Thizzler On The Roof; Album: Southeast; Format: Digital Download, streaming
"Trippin On U"	Released: April 7, 2022; Label: KoldGreedy Entertainment / Thizzler On The Roof; Album: Southeast; Format: Digital Download, streaming
"Don't Kome 2 My Funeral"	Released: April 7, 2022; Label: KoldGreedy Entertainment / Thizzler On The Roof; Album: Southeast; Format: Digital Download, streaming
"Pony"	Released: April 7, 2022; Label: KoldGreedy Entertainment / Thizzler On The Roof; Album: Southeast; Format: Digital Download, streaming
"Ricky"	Released: April 7, 2022; Label: KoldGreedy Entertainment / Thizzler On The Roof; Album: Southeast; Format: Digital Download, streaming

=== Non-album singles ===
Title	Single Details
"Trife"	Released: October 9, 2019; Label: Young Slo-Be; Non-album single; Format: Digital Download, streaming
"21:42" (with Bris)	Release Date: October 10, 2019; Label: Koldgreedy Ent; Non-album single; Format: Digital Download, streaming
"Hard 2 Kill"	Released: October 12, 2019; Label: Self-released; Non-album single; Format: Digital Download, streaming
"Necklezz"	Released: December 27, 2019; Label: Self-released; Non-album single; Format: Digital Download, streaming
"Two One"	Released: January 16, 2020; Label: Self-released; Non-album single; Format: Digital Download, streaming
"Social Media"	Released: February 14, 2020; Label: Self-released; Non-album single; Format: Digital Download, streaming
"Smurkish Mode"	Released: March 9, 2020; Label: Self-released; Non-album single; Format: Digital Download, streaming
"Butterfly (Freestyle)"	Released: March 9, 2020; Label: Self-released; Non-album single; Format: Digital Download, streaming
"Free Da Hometeam"	Released: March 11, 2020; Label: Self-released; Non-album single; Format: Digital Download, streaming
"Trey Songz"	Released: October 15, 2020; Label: KoldGreedy Entertainment / Thizzler On The Roof; Non-album single; Format: Digital Download, streaming
"Hunnit Proof" (featuring DB.Boutabag)	Released: October 23, 2020; Label: Beach Boi Music / Rapbay / Urbanlife; Non-album single; Format: Digital Download, streaming
"Minswell" (with Mac J and EBK Young Joc)	Released: November 8, 2020; Label: TrueStory Ent; Non-album single; Format: Digital Download, streaming
"Program"	Released: November 11, 2020; Label: KoldGreedy Entertainment / Thizzler On The Roof; Non-album single; Format: Digital Download, streaming
"Bruce Lee" (with Fenix Flexin and Skeamy Ru)	Released: November 18, 2020; Label: KoldGreedy Entertainment / Thizzler On The Roof; Non-album single; Format: Digital Download, streaming
"Benjamin Frank"	Released: January 1, 2021; Label: KoldGreedy Entertainment / Thizzler On The Roof; Non-album single; Format: Digital Download, streaming
"Steppin'"	Released: January 28, 2021; Label: KoldGreedy Entertainment / Thizzler On The Roof; Non-album single; Format: Digital Download, streaming
"Pop It Off"	Released: February 26, 2021; Label: KoldGreedy Entertainment / Thizzler On The Roof; Non-album single; Format: Digital Download, streaming
"Did That" (with Effn McCoy)	Released: April 4, 2021; Label: Da HunidClub ent; Non-album single; Format: Digital Download, streaming
"Boy" (with Maj4l)	Released: November 28, 2021; Label: Self-released; Non-album single; Format: Digital Download, streaming
"Nike"	Released: January 6, 2022; Label: KoldGreedy Entertainment / Thizzler On The Roof; Non-album single; Format: Digital Download, streaming
"Ksubi" (with Polo Money)	Released: January 11, 2022; Label: Cash Rulez Inc, Distributed by Rapbay / Urbanlife Distribution; Non-album single; Format: Digital Download, streaming
"Street Knocker" (with Mike Sherm)	Released: January 13, 2022; Label: Self-released; Non-album single; Format: Digital Download, streaming
"Life That We Live" (with Lil Lameezy)	Released: March 2, 2022; Label: Lion Made Empire; Non-album single; Format: Digital Download, streaming
"Dizzy" (with Maj4l	Released: April 20, 2022; Label: 4L Records; Non-album single; Format: Digital Download, streaming
"South Central 2 South East" (with Tr3way6k, YoungThreat, and EBK Young Joc)	Released: July 28, 2022; Label: Tr3way6k / Create Music Group; Non-album single; Format: Digital Download, streaming
"On My Way (Remix)" (with EBK Jaaybo, Philthy Rich, EBK Young Joc, and Dolla Dame)	Released: January 26, 2024; Label: FOD ENT.; Non-album single; Format: Digital Download, streaming
"Lonely Gangsta"	Released: February 6, 2024; Label: KoldGreedy Entertainment / Thizzler On The Roof; Non-album single; Format: Digital Download, streaming
