= Cookie Lommel =

American author and activist

- Born: 1960 (age 65–66); Cleveland, Ohio, U.S.
- Occupations: Writer; biographer; film producer; activist
- Spouse: Ulli Lommel (m. 1988; div. 2004)

Cookie Lommel (born 1960) is an American author, biographer, film producer, and activist.

== Early life ==
Cookie Lommel was born in Cleveland, Ohio. She began her career in the entertainment industry in 1981. Early on she worked as a journalist for Cashbox magazine and Radio & Records magazine. She has also worked as an entertainment industry reporter at CNN and as entertainment editor at Teen Magazine.

== Activism ==
In 2003, she was named the executive director of the Jewish Labor Committee's Western region. Prior to this, in 1992 Lommel founded Operation Unity, a non-profit organization that funded the travel of inner city minority students to live on an Israeli Kibbutz.

== Author ==
Lommel authored the 2001 book The History of Rap Music and Black Filmmakers in 2002. She is also the author of unauthorized biographies for Russell Simmons, Arnold Schwarzenegger, James Oglethorpe, Johnnie L. Cochran, Jr., Arthur Miller, Robert Church, Madame C.J. Walker, Michelle Pfeiffer, and Mary Church Terrell.

== Personal life ==
She was married to actor and film director Ulli Lommel between 1988 and 2004.
