= Blank Generation (1980 film) =

- DVD box cover
- Directed by: Ulli Lommel
- Written by: Richard Hell; Ulli Lommel; Robert Madero
- Produced by: Roger Deutsch
- Starring: Carole Bouquet; Richard Hell
- Cinematography: Atze Glanert
- Music by: Elliot Goldenthal, Richard Hell
- Distributed by: International Harmony
- Release date: 1980
- Running time: 90 minutes
- Country: United States
- Language: English

Blank Generation is a 1980 American-produced music film, directed and co-written by Ulli Lommel. It stars Carole Bouquet, Richard Hell, and Suzanna Love.

== Plot ==
French journalist Nada Lumiere and rising New York City musician Billy have a volatile relationship, frequently fighting and breaking up and then reuniting shortly after. Both have a detached approach to relationships, with Billy prone to violent mood swings and Nada often preferring to communicate with Billy via videotapes she films of herself. Billy and his band have signed with Jack and his financial backer Kellerman for an overall management and record deal, but Billy endangers it by abandoning a concert performance. Nada takes an extended break from Billy, claiming to be out of town on an assignment, to reconnect with an earlier lover and journalist colleague, Hoffritz, who comes to New York pursuing an interview with artist Andy Warhol.

In her absence, Billy grows so disillusioned with the trappings of his increasing success by signing away all his rights and royalties to Jack, and letting himself get caught up with another woman, a flaky aspiring documentarian named Lizzy. Nada finds herself no more content with Hoffritz as she was with Billy, as he is continually stymied in his attempts to connect with Warhol, who finds coy ways to dodge the interview. A mutual friend tips off Billy that Nada is still in the city, and he crashes a birthday party for her thrown by Jack, with Lizzy in tow, which rekindles her attraction to him.

After sending a dubious associate to their TV studio in his place, Warhol finally shows up for the interview. He initially sits silent to Hoffritz's questions, frustrating him, but Nada is able to coax him to expound about film, vanity and fame. Nada tells Hoffritz she intends to return to Europe with him, and has Billy drive her to the airport, where she declares they are breaking up. However, upon entering the terminal, she changes her mind and tries to return, but Billy has already driven off. In turn, Hoffritz has already boarded the plane. It is suggested both Nada and Billy are still stuck in their own emotional blankness.

== Cast ==
- Carole Bouquet as Nada
- Richard Hell as Billy
- Ulli Lommel as Hoffritz
- Suzanna Love as Lizzy
- Howard Grant as Jack
- Ben Weiner as Kellerman
- Andy Warhol as Himself
- Robert Madero as Harry
- Bill Mirring as Jonathan Marlowe
- David Pirrock as Bobby Butler
- J. Frank Butler as Bobby's Father
- Ivan Julian as member of the Voidoids
- Robert Quine as member of the Voidoids
- Mark Bell as member of the Voidoids
- Walter Steading as a violin player

== Soundtrack ==
Elliot Goldenthal composed music for the film.

All songs were written by Richard Hell and performed by Richard Hell and the Voidoids.
