= EBK Jaaybo =

American rapper

- Born: Jaymani Gorman; August 22, 2003 (age 23); Stockton, California, U.S.
- Genres: West Coast hip-hop; drill; gangsta rap
- Occupation: Rapper
- Years active: 2016–present
- Label: Encore

Jaymani Gorman (born August 22, 2003), known professionally as EBK Jaaybo, is an American rapper from Stockton, California. He is best known for his 2024 single "Boogieman", which entered the US Bubbling Under Hot 100 and Hot R&B/Hip-Hop Songs charts. Jaaybo was selected for XXL's 2025 Freshman Class.

== Personal life ==
Gorman began making music as early as 12 years old. According to Gorman, his father, referred to as 'RRari', who was killed in 2015, was his inspiration for music making.

== Legal issues ==
On May 18, 2025, Gorman was arrested in a traffic stop in Pope County, Arkansas on suspicion of illegal drug possession, and unlawful possession of a weapon.

== History of EBK ==
Everybody Killa (EBK) is a street gang in Stockton founded by Jaaybo's older half brother Malik Lott, known by his alias EBK Osama. The group is believed to have been established sometime between 2015 and 2016. As individual members such as Jaaybo, Osama, Young Joc and Young Slo-Be started rapping, the gang also became known as a rap group. Initially, these individuals were all part of the rap collective known as EBK Hotboiiz, a music group that garnered local attention but ultimately disbanded in 2021. The gang itself fractured in two, with both sides accusing a member of the other of snitching in a drug distribution conspiracy case. Despite the initial tension between these groups, relations began to ease following the death of Young Slo-Be in 2022. Notably, members affiliated with both factions have released new music under the original EBK Hotboiiz name as recently as 2025.

In 2018, the Stockton Police Department officially classified EBK as a criminal street gang due to its escalating involvement in violent and organized criminal activity. This designation followed a pattern of increasing surveillance and law enforcement scrutiny. The following year, in 2019, an investigation into the group's activities resulted in the arrest of nine individuals connected to EBK, further solidifying law enforcement's stance on the organization's classification.

EBK has developed a number of significant rivalries in Stockton and Sacramento. Most notably, EBK is feuding with the South Side Mob, a Crip gang. Affiliated groups the FlyBoyz and Muddy Boyz (MB), who were the biggest targets for EBK. Tensions reportedly began with early collaborations and personal associations among members, which later deteriorated into hostility due to gang rivalries and personal disputes. Over time, these disagreements escalated into a larger feud marked by diss tracks, social media threats, and suspected reprisals.

Jaaybo has publicly targeted rival gangs through music, often dissing them. One of the most prominent examples is the track “F*ck Everybody”, in which he lists both the gangs and individual members he considers enemies. The song rapidly gained attention, amassing over 4 million views on YouTube within two months of its release.

== Discography ==
=== Albums ===
- 2021 (2021)
- Letter 4 The Streets (2021)
- Rrari 4Eva (2022)
- Sinners Prayer (2023)
- The Reaper (2024)
- Don't Trust Me (2025)
