= Love Is Colder Than Death (film) =

1969 film by Rainer Werner Fassbinder

- Theatrical release poster
- German: Liebe ist kälter als der Tod
- Directed by: Rainer Werner Fassbinder
- Written by: Rainer Werner Fassbinder
- Produced by: Peer Raben; Thomas Schamoni
- Starring: Rainer Werner Fassbinder; Ulli Lommel; Hanna Schygulla
- Cinematography: Dietrich Lohmann
- Edited by: Franz Walsch (Note: Pseudonym for Rainer Werner Fassbinder)
- Music by: Holger Münzer; Peer Raben
- Production company: Antiteater-X-Film
- Release dates: 26 June 1969 (Berlin); 16 January 1970 (West Germany)
- Running time: 88 minutes
- Country: West Germany
- Language: German
- Budget: DEM 95,000

Love is Colder Than Death (German: Liebe ist kälter als der Tod (Note: In the original theater presentation in West Berlin the title was first Kälter als der Tod; at the beginning of film production, it was Liebe – kälter als der Tod as on some film posters.)) is a 1969 West German crime film written, starring, edited and directed by Rainer Werner Fassbinder, his feature directorial debut. The film co-stars Ulli Lommel and Hanna Schygulla, both of whom would become regular collaborators of Fassbinder. The plot follows a small-time gangster (Lommel) who is caught in a love-triangle with a sex worker (Schygulla) and her pimp (Fassbinder).

The film premiered at the 19th Berlin International Film Festival, where it received a polarized reaction, but was nominated for the Golden Bear. At the 1970 German Film Awards, the film won awards for Best Ensemble Cast and Best Cinematography (Dietrich Lohmann).

== Plot ==
Petty hood Franz Walsch refuses to join a large criminal syndicate, where he meets a handsome but cold young thug called Bruno Straub and gives him his address in Munich. It is the flat of the prostitute Joanna, where Franz lives as her pimp. Bruno has been ordered by the syndicate to follow Franz and on going to the address is told he has moved. So he goes round the streets of the city asking prostitutes if they know a prostitute called Joanna.

Eventually he finds where the pair are hiding, because Franz is being sought by a Turk for killing his brother. Bruno offers to solve the problem, so the three go to the café where the Turk can be found and shoot him. As they leave, Bruno also shoots the waitress who is the only witness. Franz is picked up by the police for both killings and, while he is held for questioning, Joanna starts an affair with Bruno.

When Franz is released because the police have no evidence, the three then plan a bank robbery. As they arrive outside, plainclothes police appear and Bruno is killed in a shootout while Franz and Joanna get away. In the car she tells him she had tipped the cops off about the robbery. He says "Nutte" [whore] and keeps on driving as the film fades to white.

== Cast ==
- Ulli Lommel as Bruno Straub
- Rainer Werner Fassbinder as Franz Walsch
- Hanna Schygulla as Joanna
- Hans Hirschmüller as Peter
- Katrin Schaake as Woman on train
- Peter Berling as Arms dealer
- Hannes Gromball as John
- Irm Hermann as Sunglasses saleswoman
- Liz Söllner as Newspaper saleswoman
- Gisela Otto, Ingrid Caven, and Ursula Strätz as Prostitutes
- Les Olvides as Georges
- Peer Raben as Jürgen
- Peter Moland as Syndicate interrogator
- Anastassios Karalas as Turkish man
- Rudolf Waldemar Brem as Motorcycle cop
- Yaak Karsunke as Commissioner
- Monika Nüchtern as Erika Rohmer
- Howard Gaines as Raoul
- Kurt Raab as Department store detective

== Production ==
The film was shot on-location in Munich, using members of Fassbinder's Anti-Theater company as cast and crew. In a manner that would become typical of Fassbinder's productions, many of the cast doubled as crew. Ulli Lommel was the film's production design, Katrin Schaake was a script doctor and an assistant film editor, and Peer Raben co-wrote the film's score and was a producer.

The film is dedicated to "Claude Chabrol, Éric Rohmer, Jean-Marie Straub, Linio, and Cuncho". The last two refer to the main characters in Damiano Damiani's 1966 film A Bullet for the General. A minor character in the film is named after Rohmer. Ulli Lommel's styling (and also the poster artwork) is inspired by Alain Delon in Le Samouraï.

== Reception ==
Initial reception was generally negative, and the film was even booed at the 19th Berlin International Film Festival in 1969. Today, however, it is seen as a fine example of Fassbinder's early style, with a heavy French New Wave influence.

Richard Brody called the film one with "youth and its ardor, its urgency, its irrepressible outpouring of creative energy."

=== Accolades ===
Institution	Year	Category	Nominee	Result
Berlin International Film Festival	1969	Golden Bear	Rainer Werner Fassbinder	Nominated
German Film Awards	1970	Best Performance by an Ensemble	—N/a	Won (Note: Shared with Katzelmacher and Gods of the Plague.)
German Film Awards	1970	Best Cinematography	Dietrich Lohmann	Won (Note: Shared with A Big Grey-Blue Bird, Katzelmacher and Gods of the Plague.)
