= Cocaine Cowboys (1979 film) =

- Theatrical release poster
- Directed by: Ulli Lommel
- Screenplay by: Ulli Lommel; Spencer Compton; Tom Sullivan; Victor Bockris
- Produced by: Franz-Christoph Giercke
- Starring: Jack Palance; Tom Sullivan; Andy Warhol
- Cinematography: Jochen Breitenstein
- Edited by: Paul Evans
- Music by: Elliot Goldenthal
- Production companies: Summa CGI; CMI; Sound One Corp.
- Distributed by: International Harmony, Inc.
- Release dates: October 5, 1979 (New York City); June 11, 1980 (United States)
- Running time: 87 minutes
- Country: United States
- Language: English

Cocaine Cowboys is a 1979 American crime drama film directed by Ulli Lommel and starring Tom Sullivan and Jack Palance. The film follows a drug smuggler who attempts to leave the narcotics trade behind by reinventing himself as a rock musician. Inspired in part by Sullivan's own experiences, the production was financed by Sullivan and filmed primarily at the Montauk estate of Andy Warhol, who makes a cameo appearance.

== Plot ==
Dustin, the leader of a rock band on the verge of success, and his manager Raphael ("Raf") finance their musical ambitions through cocaine smuggling. Determined to leave the drug trade behind and focus on their music career, they agree to undertake one final shipment for the Mafia. When a police raid disrupts the operation, a cache of cocaine is lost near the band's coastal estate. As mobsters demand the return of their merchandise, Dustin, Raf, and their associates race to recover the missing drugs while evading both organized crime figures and law enforcement.

== Cast ==
- Tom Sullivan playing "Dustin", a singer and song writer and drug trafficker
- Jack Palance playing "Raphael", a shady, imposing rock band manager who coordinates drug-smuggling operations to fund his band's musical ambitions.
- Andy Warhol, playing himself, as part of the contract to film at his estate.
- Suzanna Love, playing "Lucy", a member of the rock band's inner circle living at the Montauk estate
- Esther Farfán, at the time Esther Oldham Farfan, playing "Esther Oldham", a dancer and background member of the rock band's inner circle.
- Winnie Hollmann, playing an unnamed background role as one of the band's groupies and girlfriends hanging out at the Montauk estate.
- Richard Young, playing "Terry", one of the core members of Dustin's rock band
- Toni Manufo, playing "Phil", one of the mob-affiliated henchmen or associates tied to the movie's drug business.
- Pete Huckabee playing "Dean", the drummer of the rock band.
- Richard Young playing Terry, a core member of the rock band.
- Richard Bassett playing Herman, a local henchmen or underworld associates connected to the film's tense, coastal drug-smuggling trade.
- Tzi Ma playing Jimmy Lee, an underworld figure tied to the film's dangerous, coastal drug-smuggling network.

== Background ==
The origins of Cocaine Cowboys can be traced to the social circle surrounding Pop artist Andy Warhol and drug smuggler Tom Sullivan in 1978. Sullivan, who had reportedly amassed substantial wealth through drug trafficking, became immersed in New York nightlife after arriving in the city with large amounts of cash and establishing a relationship with Interview magazine editor Catherine Guinness. Through Warhol, Sullivan became romantically involved with Margaret Trudeau, who was separated from her husband Pierre Trudeau, the prime minister of Canada.

In the spring of 1978, Sullivan rented Warhol's estate Eothen in Montauk, New York. Around the same time, German filmmaker Ulli Lommel and producer Christopher Giercke proposed financing a feature film with Sullivan's backing. Sullivan and Lommel developed a story about a drug smuggler attempting to leave the narcotics trade behind by reinventing himself as a rock star. The project drew heavily upon Sullivan's own experiences, which had earned him the nickname "Cocaine cowboy."

== Production ==
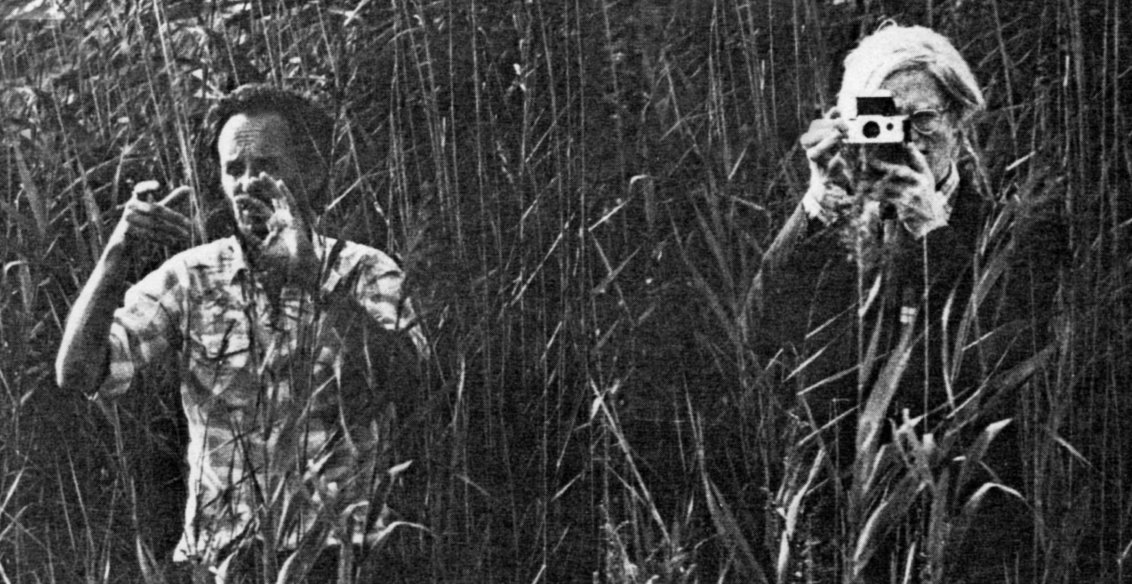
Lommel and Warhol on the set of Cocaine Cowboys. Warhol is using a Polaroid SX-70 camera.

Principal photography on Cocaine Cowboys began in the summer of 1978, with much of the production centered around Warhol's Montauk property, which served as a rehearsal and filming location for the fictional rock band featured in the film. Inspired by rock groups such as the Rolling Stones, the production assembled a band to perform in the film while Sullivan took the lead role.

Veteran actor Jack Palance was cast as the band's manager after being offered a substantial advance payment. Warhol also agreed to appear in a cameo role as himself, reportedly receiving an additional fee of $4,000 on top of the three-month rental income from the Montauk estate. He appeared in the film conducting an on-screen interview with Palance.

During filming, however, the production became increasingly troubled. According to Warhol associate Vincent Fremont, the crew caused significant disruption at the property, while local police were called to the estate on multiple occasions. Relations further deteriorated when Fremont attempted to collect Warhol's acting fee and allegedly encountered an armed producer. Despite the production difficulties, Cocaine Cowboys was completed and released in 1979.

== Reception ==
The film was given a very negative review at the time of its release by Tom Buckley in The New York Times. Buckley wrote that apart from a good performance by Jack Palance, the other actors were "obvious amateurs", the story "flimsy", the dialogue poor and despite previous acting and directing successes Ulli Lommel's direction was "rudimentary".

When mentioned in a Reuters news article in 2007 the film was referred to as a "clunker".

Filmmakers Quentin Tarantino and Roger Avary both praised the film on the first episode of The Video Archives Podcast.
