= Curse of the Zodiac =

- Directed by: Ulli Lommel
- Written by: Ulli Lommel
- Starring: Cassandra Church; Jack Quinn
- Distributed by: Lions Gate Entertainment
- Release date: May 15, 2007 (U.S.)
- Running time: 82 minutes
- Country: United States
- Language: English

Curse of the Zodiac is a 2007 American horror film from Lionsgate, written and directed by Ulli Lommel, inspired by the true story of the hunt for a notorious serial killer known as "Zodiac" who claimed responsibility for the still unsolved murders.

It stars Cassandra Church and Jack Quinn, and was released directly to DVD.

== Plot ==
The Zodiac Killer terrorizes the San Francisco Bay area in the early 1970s. He murders random people and uses cryptic symbols and coded messages to taunt the media and the San Francisco Police, leaving the people of San Francisco in fear.

== Cast ==
- Jack Quinn
- Cassandra Church
- Jon E. Nimetz
- Victoria Ullmann
- Lyn Beausoleil
- Colette Clair

== Reception ==
A half-point out of a possible five was given to the film by Jon Condit of Dread Central, who concluded, "The sorry fact is that Curse of the Zodiac is a total mess". David Johnson of DVD Verdict heavily criticized Curse of the Zodiac, writing, "The movie plays out like this: Zodiac Killer wanders around, the camera shakes a lot, he kills a girl, the camera shakes a lot, the psychic gets a headache and has a vision of the crime scene, the camera shakes a lot, Zodiac calls the journalist and talks trash, the camera shakes a lot and repeat x4. Even if you're able to penetrate the insane editing, the narrative within will almost certainly bore your migraine-having ass. Add to that, the acting is universally atrocious—the scenes with the psychic and her boyfriend are a case study on how to miss cues and flub lines". Bloody Disgusting's Brian W. Collins included Curse of the Zodiac on his 10 Worst Horror Films of 2007 list, in which he stated, "Not getting a single detail right about the Zodiac (other than the setting) is the least of its problems. It took effort to even get through the entire film, which consisted mainly of 3 scenes repeated over and over (killer taunts the cop, killer taunts the girl, killer kills some hippies we have never seen before)". Garrett and Sean Neil of Something Awful awarded a near "perfect" score of -49/-50, and described the film as nothing more than "a twisted labyrinth of spinning, out-of-focus cameras and pointless gibberish".
