= Return of the Boogeyman =

- Directed by: Deland Nurse
- Written by: Deland Nurse
- Starring: Kelly Galindo; Suzanna Love; Omar Kaczmarczyk
- Music by: David Porcelino
- Release date: May 5, 1994
- Running time: 76 minutes
- Country: United States
- Language: English

Return of the Boogeyman (also known as Boogeyman III) is a 1994 American horror film directed by Deland Nurse. It was released in the US by Sony Pictures.

The film contains scenes of graphic violence, and is mostly made up of stock footage from The Boogeyman.

== Plot ==
A young woman named Annie has horrible nightmares every time she goes to sleep. She soon realizes that her nightmares are prophetic dreams of the oncoming slaughter of the Boogeyman. She and her friends then set off to stop him.

== Cast ==
- Kelly Galindo as Annie

== Critical reception ==
The film has terrible critical reviews. A review in HorrorNews noted that "Return of the Boogeyman is a terrible film and should pretty much be avoided at all cost".
