= Revenge of the Stolen Stars =

1985 film

- German DVD release cover
- Directed by: Ulli Lommel
- Written by: Ben A. Hein; Ulli Lommel
- Produced by: Roger Deutsch; Kevin M. Kallberg; Ulli Lommel; Suzanna Love
- Starring: Klaus Kinski; Suzanna Love; Ulli Lommel
- Cinematography: David Sperling; Jürg V. Walther
- Edited by: Warren G. Peters; Lynn M. Zook
- Music by: Bob Thiele
- Production companies: A.M.A. Film; R. Deutsch Productions; Six Stars Production
- Distributed by: DPI (France)
- Release date: 1985
- Running time: 76 minutes
- Country: United States
- Language: English

Revenge of the Stolen Stars is a 1985 American comedy fantasy film cowritten and directed by Ulli Lommel and starring Klaus Kinski, Suzanna Love, Barry Hickey and Ulli Lommel.

== Plot ==
A young man named Gene McBride inherits a large plantation and a mine of rubies on an island south of the China Sea. Gene moves there with his beloved partner Kelly to search the Six Stars, a famous collection of rubies. However, soon enough the couple find out that they will have to live with the ghost of Donald McBride, the original plantation owner and Gene's uncle, as well as confronting a curse.

== Cast ==
- Barry Hickey as Gene McBride
- Suzanna Love as Kelly
- Klaus Kinski as Donald McBride
- Ulli Lommel as Max Stern
- Kitty O'Shea as Lupe
- Amable Aguiluz (as Tikoy Aguiluz)
- Tania Aija as Shace Maron
- Eugene Choy as Malu
- James Chung
- Sarah Golden
- Master Ho Sik Pak as Prince Kali (as Ho Sik Pak)
- Norman Ino
- Thom Jones
- Vincent Kramer
- Tuny Lee
- Joycelyne Lew as Maid (as Joyce Lew)
- Andy Lyon as Alex
- Joyce Macías Figueroa
- James Marshall as Consul
- Craig Minomiya
- Eric Wong

== Production ==
Ulli Lommel was initially attached at one point to direct Nineteen Eighty-Four (1984), but after being passed on for another director he instead ended up shooting Revenge of the Stolen Stars.

Lommel was unsure about casting Klaus Kinski due to his difficult reputation, but after the latter's agent convinced Lommel that Kinski had "mellowed" and that he was "a different person now", he decided to meet with Kinski at the Chateau Marmont hotel in Los Angeles and found him to be very pleasant, in contrast with Kinski's previous and notorious bouts of irascible and unstable behaviour. But when filming started, Kinski was very hard to work with and constantly complained about the lights and microphones and frequently asked to remove them, so eventually the crew only used a few soft lights and very small microphones in the Kinski scenes, which is the reason (according to Lommel) the sound quality changes so much between scenes.

Kinski also didn't want to sit on a chair when the camera crew wanted to shoot him from different angles, so continuity wasn't possible. Because of that Lommel decided to change Kinski's character to a ghost, which was a brilliant idea in Kinski's opinion; Kinski became so elated with Lommel's idea that he also shouted at the moment "Oh my god, you are a fucking genius!", and immediately told Lommel that he wouldn't work in the future with any other director than him, to which Lommel's reply was: "Yeah, right!".

Kinski drank heavily on set and at one point practically forced the entire crew to shoot almost thirty consecutive hours, so they could finally wrap up his scenes and be done with his involvement, which was another idea Lommel had suggested. Kinski was so happy with this that two days later he approached Lommel on a beach in Mexico (where an important part of the shooting took place) to show him his appreciation, telling the latter that he had a great time while they worked together, and praising his directing style, saying "you have so much imagination!". Lommel's half-soothing and half-ironical answer was: "Well thanks Klaus, that's very kind of you".

During the filming, Suzanna Love, the wife of the film's director Ulli Lommel, fell in love with Klaus Kinski. At the end of the film, the two ran away to his house. There Kinski tied up and kept a gun on the actress, who still managed to call her husband for help. Lommel showed up at Kinski's house with two bodyguards who hit him in the chin and freed the woman.
