= Boogieman (EBK Jaaybo song) =

2024 single by EBK Jaaybo

Single by EBK Jaaybo

from the album The Reaper
- Released: April 24, 2024
- Genre: Gangsta rap
- Length: 2:11
- Label: Encore Recordings
- Songwriter: Jaymani Gorman
- Producer: Yvnng Ecko

EBK Jaaybo singles chronology
"Probably Cursed" (2024)	"Boogieman" (2024)	"Hotboiiz" (2024)

Music video
- "Boogieman" on YouTube

"Boogieman" is a song by American rapper EBK Jaaybo, released to streaming services on April 24, 2024. It was produced by Yvnng Ecko.

== Composition ==
The song uses a choir in the background as a looped sample, along with bass and distorted drums in the production.

== Critical reception ==
The song received generally positive reviews. Steven Louis of Passion of the Weiss commented "Still sharpening iron while endungeoned in the carceral void, EBK Jaaybo sounds as commanding and unfuckwittable as ever" and "Jaaybo's anti-pop approach continues to astound despite his increasing vitality." Jordan Darville of The Fader praised EBK Jaaybo's rapping, stating it "gives an almost foreboding level of confidence and quiet aggression", and wrote the beat "provides most of the superficial menace", remarking the "doom-saying" choir and drums are "pulled back at the perfect moments for maximum effect." Darville continued to write that "For his part, Jaaybo isn't some snarling monster but rather a sedate mafioso, leaning back in his chair and studying the enemy seated across from him. My only criticism of the song is at the end, where Jaaybo repeats 'Turn this beat off if I ain't trippin' on it' just before the song ends. He's been tripping on it for over two minutes straight; why make it sound like he's stumbled for even a second?" Donald Morrison of Passion of the Weiss described the beat as "so hard it almost blew out my computer speakers" and commented "As it is, 'Boogieman' will be the first song I play if someone hands me the aux in their car this summer."

== Music video ==
The music video was directed by Byrd. It features "shadowy, strobing lights".

== Charts ==
Chart performance for "Boogieman"
Chart (2024)	Peak position
US Bubbling Under Hot 100 Singles (Billboard)	17
US Hot R&B/Hip-Hop Songs (Billboard)	37
