= Robert Walker (actor, born 1940) =

American actor (1940–2019)

Robert Walker Jr.
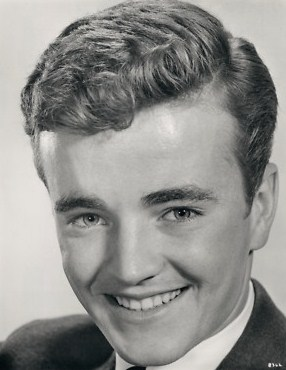
- Walker in 1963
- Born: Robert Hudson Walker Jr. April 15, 1940; New York City, New York, U.S.
- Died: December 5, 2019 (aged 79); Malibu, California, U.S.
- Years active: 1962–2018
- Known for: Easy Rider; The War Wagon; Charlie X; Ensign Pulver
- Spouses: Ellie Wood Walker (m. 1962; div. 1976) Judy Motulsky (m. 1978; div. 1980) Dawn May Newman (m. 1981)
- Children: 7
- Parent(s): Robert Walker; Jennifer Jones

Robert Hudson Walker Jr. (April 15, 1940 – December 5, 2019) was an American actor who appeared in such films as Ensign Pulver (1964), Easy Rider (1969), Beware! The Blob (1972), and The Passover Plot (1976). He was a familiar presence on television in the 1960s and early 1970s.

== Early life ==
Walker was born in Jamaica, Queens, New York. His parents were actors Robert Walker and Jennifer Jones. He attended The Lawrenceville School and trained as an actor at the Actors Studio.

He studied tai chi under Marshall Ho'o, a skill that he later exhibited in his role in Easy Rider.

== Career ==
Walker began his acting career in 1962 with TV roles on Route 66 ("Across Walnuts and Wine") and Naked City ("Dust Devil on a Quiet Street", playing the title role of an emotionally disturbed actor who lived and performed on the streets and in circuses). His film debut was in The Hook in 1963; other film appearances, in addition to Easy Rider, included the title role in Ensign Pulver (1964) with Burl Ives and Walter Matthau; The War Wagon (1967) with John Wayne and Kirk Douglas; the title role in Young Billy Young (1969), alongside Robert Mitchum; and Beware! The Blob, or—Son of Blob (1972). He starred in Angkor: Cambodia Express (1982) with Nancy Kwan, Christopher George, Woody Strode, and Sorapong Chatree.

On television in the 1960s, in The Big Valley episode "My Son, My Son" (1965), Walker portrayed Evan Miles, an emotionally disturbed college dropout who becomes obsessed with childhood friend Audra Barkley. Walker was possibly best-known for his appearance in the first season Star Trek episode "Charlie X" (1966) as Charles 'Charlie' Evans, a 17-year-old social misfit with psychic powers. Also in 1966, he appeared in the fifth season of the series Combat! in the episode "Ollie Joe" . He had the title role in an episode of The Time Tunnel titled "Billy the Kid" (1967). He also portrayed Nick Baxter, an ill alien who caused the deaths of humans by touch, in an episode of The Invaders ("Panic", 1967). He played Mark Cole in an episode of Bonanza ("The Gentle Ones", 1967).

In the 1970s, Walker had a role in an episode of Columbo ("Mind Over Mayhem", 1974), and as an innocent longshoreman who takes the blame for a murder on Quincy, M.E. ("The Hero Syndrome", 1977). He also appeared in the pilot episode of The Eddie Capra Mysteries (1978).

Walker maintained a presence on episodic television in the 1980s and 1990s. He guest-starred in two episodes of Murder, She Wrote with Angela Lansbury, the first time in "The Corpse Flew First Class" (1987), and as a mentally handicapped man in "Shear Madness" (1990). He appeared in L.A. Law and In the Heat of the Night, both in 1991. He also made a television series appearance in 1993 and had a small role in the film Beyond the Darkness (2018) before officially retiring in 2018.

== Personal life and death ==
Walker was married three times, to Ellie Wood, to Judy Motulsky, and finally to Dawn Walker. He had seven children.

He died at the age of 79 at his home in Malibu, California, on December 5, 2019.

== Filmography ==
Year	Title	Role	Notes
1962	Naked City	Neil McCaw	Episode: "Dust Devil on a Quiet Street"
1962	Route 66	Michael Ely	Episode: "Across Walnuts and Wine"
1962–1964	Ben Casey	Larry Franklin / David Duncan	2 episodes
1963	The Hook	Private O.A. Dennison	
1963	The Ceremony	Dominic	
1964	Ensign Pulver	Ensign Frank Pulver	feature film
1964	Dr. Kildare	Neal Tomlinson	Episode: "Quid Pro Quo"
1965	The Touching and the Not Touching		
1965	The Defenders	Erik Davis	2 episodes
1965	The Big Valley	Evan Miles	Episode: “My Son, My Son"
1966	COMBAT!	Ollie Joe Brown	Episode: "Ollie Joe"
1966	12 O'Clock High	Master Sergeant Heinz Reiniger	2 episodes
1966	The Trials of O'Brien	Arthur Barry	Episode: "The Only Game in Town"
1966	Star Trek	Charlie Evans	S1:E2, "Charlie X"
1966–1968	The F.B.I.	Paul Donald Thorpe / Willard Smith	2 episodes
1967	The Monroes	Quint Gregger	Episode: "Killer Cougar"
1967	The Time Tunnel	Billy the Kid / William H. Bonney	Episode: "Billy the Kid"
1967	The Happening	Herby	
1967	The War Wagon	Billy Hyatt	
1967	Bonanza	Mark Cole	Episode: "The Gentle Ones"
1967	The Invaders	Nick Baxter	Episode: "Panic"
1968	The Savage Seven	Johnnie Little Hawk	
1968	Eve	Mike Yates	
1968	Killers Three	Johnny Warder	
1969	Agilok & Blubbo	Agilok	
1969	Easy Rider	Jack	
1969	Young Billy Young	Billy Young	
1970	The Man from O.R.G.Y.	Steve Victor	
1970	Road to Salina	Jonas	
1972	Beware! The Blob	Bobby Hartford	
1973	Marcus Welby, M.D.	Denny Reed	Episode: "A More Exciting Case"
1973	Don Juan, or If Don Juan Were a Woman	Le Guitariste	
1973	Hex	"Chupo"	
1974	The Spectre of Edgar Allan Poe	Edgar Allan Poe	
1974	Gone with the West	The Sheriff of Black Miller	
1974	Cannon	Del Foxworth	Episode: "The Avenger"
1974	Columbo	Neil Cahill	Episode: "Mind Over Mayhem"
1975	The Streets of San Francisco	Gene Watson	Episode: "Asylum"
1976	Police Woman	Nat Stark	Episode: "Tender Soldier"
1976	The Passover Plot	Bar Talmi	
1977	Quincy, M.E.	Peter Thorwald	Episode: "The Hero Syndrome"
1977	Evil Town	Mike Segal	
1978	The Six Million Dollar Man	Cloche / Bell	2 episodes
1978	The Eddie Capra Mysteries	Toby Lloyd	Episode: "Nightmare at Pendragon Castle"
1978	The Next Step Beyond	Walter Hastings	Episode: "Other Voices"
1979	Charlie's Angels	Burt Marshall	Episode: "Angels at the Altar"
1980	Beulah Land	Bruce Davis	3-part miniseries
1982	CHiPs	Tom Corey	Episode: "Ice Cream Man"
1982	Angkor: Cambodia Express	Andrew Cameron	
1983	Olivia	Michael "Mike" Grant	
1983	Making of a Male Model	Joseph	TV movie
1983	The Devonsville Terror	Matthew Pendleton	
1983	Matt Houston	Adrian Harcomb	Episode: "The Outsider"
1983	Hambone and Hillie	The Wanderer	
1985	Simon & Simon	Mr. Matt Glass	Episode: "Slither"
1985	Riptide	Oscar Davenport	Episode: "The Bargain Department"
1985–1986	Dallas	Harding Devers	3 episodes
1986	The Fall Guy	Eye-Patch Poker Player	2 episodes
1986	Days of Our Lives	Dr. Collins	2 episodes
1989	Dragnet	Bruce Fellows	Episode: "Where's Sadie?"
1990	Murder, She Wrote	George Owens	2 episodes
1991	In the Heat of the Night	Ray Garrett	Episode: "An Execution of Trust"
1991	LA Law	William Lowell	Episode: "Good to the Last Drop"
1992	Santa Barbara	Dr. Pressman	
1993	FBI: The Untold Stories	Berry	Episode: "Kill for Love"
2017	Lock It Up Dog	Vladimir	
2018	Beyond the Darkness	Agent Mills	(final film role)
