= Ulli Lommel =

German actor, film director and screenwriter

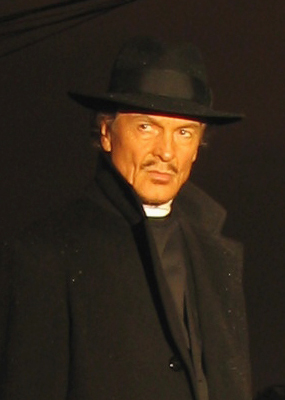
- Lommel in January 2007
- Born: 21 December 1944; Zielenzig, Oststernberg, Germany (now Sulęcin, Lubuskie, Poland)
- Died: 2 December 2017 (aged 72); Stuttgart, Baden-Württemberg, Germany
- Occupations: Actor, director
- Years active: 1963–2017
- Spouses: Suzanna Love (m. 1978; div. 1987) Cookie Lommel (m. 1988; div. 2004) Tatjana Lommel (m. 2016)

Ulli Lommel (21 December 1944 – 2 December 2017) was a German actor and director, noted for his many collaborations with Rainer Werner Fassbinder and his association with the New German Cinema movement. Lommel spent time at The Factory and was a creative associate of Andy Warhol, with whom he made several films and works of art. He moved to the United States in 1977, where he wrote, directed and starred in over 50 films.

== Early life ==
Born in Zielenzig in 1944, a few weeks before the arrival of the Red Army, Lommel's family fled the city, wrapping the infant Ulli in a roll of carpet. His father, Ludwig, was a popular radio personality. His mother was the actress Karla van Cleef.

While living in Bad Nauheim as a teenager, Lommel performed with Elvis Presley.

== Career ==
Lommel started his cinematic career as an actor in the early 1960s. One of his first film roles was in Russ Meyer's Fanny Hill, in which he starred alongside Italian actress Letícia Román. In 1969, he appeared in Rainer Werner Fassbinder's directorial debut Love Is Colder Than Death. The movie, an existentialist film noir, received a shocked and confused response at the Berlin International Film Festival in 1969, but the cast as an ensemble would go on to win an award at the German Film Awards in 1970.

In 1971, Fassbinder's surrealist western Whity, which Lommel produced and starred in the leading role, won several German Film Awards (the German Oscars). Shot in Almería, Spain, in the summer of 1970, the shoot was so tumultuous and grueling that it became the source of inspiration for the subsequent Fassbinder film, Beware of a Holy Whore. Beware of a Holy Whore was a postmodern analysis of Fassbinder's career. in which he used fourth wall methods to poke fun at the trials and tribulations of filmmaking.

He starred in Fassbinder's The American Soldier (1970), World on a Wire (1973) and Chinese Roulette (1976) among others. Lommel's second film as director, The Tenderness of Wolves, which was produced by Fassbinder, was a drama about the murders of Fritz Haarmann. Haarmann was also the inspiration behind Fritz Lang's M. This was the feature which brought him to the attention of Andy Warhol, after the film was screened at a Chicago Film Festival.

A very enthusiastic review was written by the renowned critic Vincent Canby in the New York Times which stated:

"It is beautifully and enthusiastically performed and it doesn't contain a single superfluous or redundant camera movement. Like Mr. Fassbinder's own early films, 'Tenderness of the Wolves' is cryptic, tough-talking and swaggering in the manner of someone who means to shock his elders. Like the early Warhol work, "Tenderness of the Wolves" seems to be sending up everyone and everything, but, unlike the Warhol movies, it takes filmmaking—the possibilities of the discipline—with complete seriousness."

The film was nominated at the 23rd Berlin International Film Festival for the Golden Bear.

Lommel moved to the United States in 1977 and started working with Andy Warhol. He became fascinated with Warhol's artistic style. Lommel owned an array of Warhol's polaroid photographs and pop art pieces. Their friendship led to Warhol becoming involved with several of Lommel's films. In 1978, he directed Cocaine Cowboys, a rock and roll western which starred Jack Palance and Andy Warhol. Warhol also appeared in Lommel's Blank Generation (1980), a film which focused on the punk rock scene in New York City. It starred the punk icon Richard Hell and his band Richard Hell and the Voidoids. Several scenes were filmed in CBGB and offer an insight into the frenetic madness of the scene at the time.

In 1980, Lommel directed The Boogeyman, which became a worldwide hit. The film gained notoriety in the UK, when it was added to the DPP 'Video Nasties' list. After the success of Boogeyman, Lommel made several more genre features, including Brainwaves (1983), starring Tony Curtis and Vera Miles, The Devonsville Terror (1983) with Donald Pleasence, and Revenge of the Stolen Stars (1985) with Klaus Kinski.

For a period of four years, Lommel made a series of direct-to-video movies based on the lives of serial killers, most of which were released through Lionsgate.

In 2002, Lommel participated in the documentary Fassbinder in Hollywood, which is available as part of the Arrow Films and Video Fassbinder Collection (Vol 2). The documentary contains an interview with Wim Wenders.

In 2012 and early 2013, Lommel produced the feature "The 4 Senses", A Metropole Film production with a $3 million budget, which shot in Venice and Verona, Italy and Savannah, Georgia. (USA). Rudiger von Spies was the writer and director.

In the summer of 2013 Lommel went for nine months to Brazil to work on several projects. He completed his bio-epic documentary Mondo Americana and wrote a book. Ulli Lommel: CAMPO BAHIA and made a film about Campo Bahia, the official camp for the Germany national football team in Brazil.

In 2016, Hollywood Action House began developing Boogeyman Chronicles, a series of eight 45-minute episodes. Inspired by Lommel's 1980 cult hit The Boogeyman, the first episode was planned to begin airing worldwide on Halloween 2018. The new story line was developed after test audiences in the U.S. and Europe saw various cuts of a series of plot-possibilities and characters titled "Boogeyman Reincarnation". The writing team headed by Colin McCracken worked on episodes 2–8 with the plan to create a total of up to 64 episodes. Lommel indicated that, even though he directed episode 1, most of the remaining episodes would be directed by a series of young directors from the U.S., Europe and Asia.

Lommel was celebrated as part of the Yes! Yes! Yes! Warholmania event at the 2015 Munich Film Festival. Several screenings of his works with Warhol took place alongside a series of special interviews.

== Filmography ==
=== As director ===
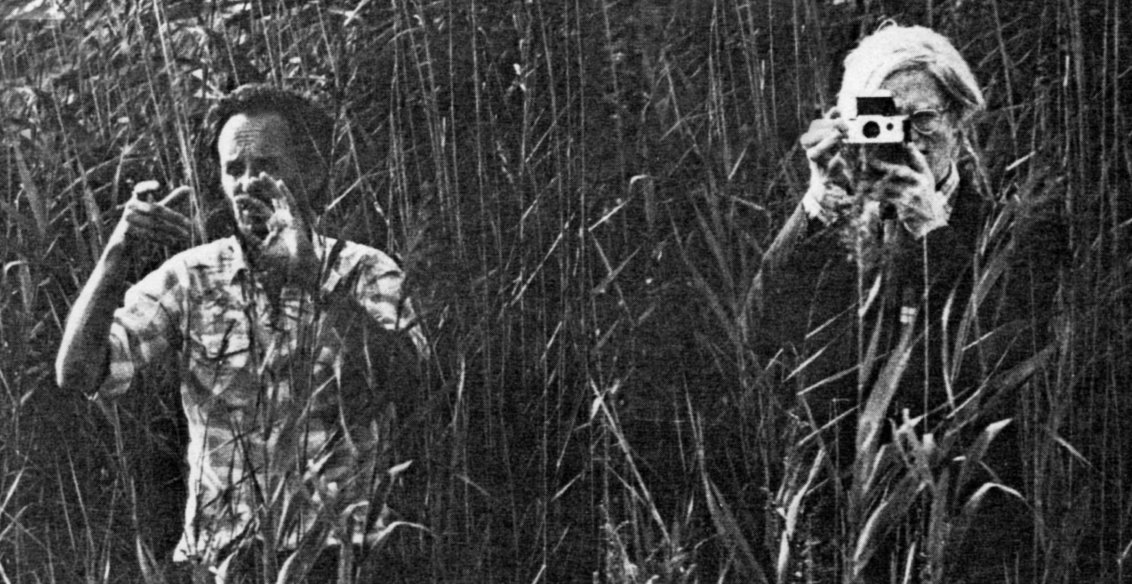
Lommel (left) with Andy Warhol on the set of Cocaine Cowboys (1979)

- Haytabo (1971)
- The Tenderness of Wolves (1973)
- Jodeln is ka Sünd (1974)
- Wachtmeister Rahn (1974)
- A Second Spring (1975)
- Adolf and Marlene (1977)
- Ausgerechnet Bananen (1978)
- Cocaine Cowboys (1979)
- Blank Generation (1980)
- The Boogeyman (1980)
- BrainWaves (1982)
- The Devonsville Terror (1983)
- Olivia, also known as Double Jeopardy and Prozzie (1983)
- Strangers in Paradise (1984)
- Revenge of the Stolen Stars (1985)
- I.F.O.: Identified Flying Object (1987)
- Heaven and Earth (1987)
- Overkill (1987)
- Cold Heat (1989)
- WarBirds (1989)
- The Big Sweat (1991)
- Marilyn, My Love (1994)
- Daniel – Der Zauberer (2004)
- Zombie Nation (2005)
- Zodiac Killer (2005)
- B.T.K. Killer (2005)
- Green River Killer (2005)
- Killer Pickton (2005)
- Diary of a Cannibal (2006)
- The Raven (2006)
- Black Dahlia (2006)
- Curse of the Zodiac (2007)
- The Tomb (2007)
- Borderline Cult (2007)
- Killer Nurse (aka: Angel of Death 2007)
- Baseline Killer (2008)
- Son of Sam (2008)
- Dungeon Girl (2008) (aka: Blood Dungeon, 2012)
- Absolute Evil (2008)
- Nightstalker (2009)
- D.C. Sniper (2009)
- Mondo Americana (2017)
- America: Land of the Freeks (2017)
- Factory Cowboys: Working with Warhol (2018)
- Queen of Rio (2018)
- Genus X (2018)

=== As actor ===
- Only a Woman (1962)
- The Endless Night (1963) – junger Mann (uncredited)
- And So to Bed (1963)
- Fanny Hill (1964) – Charles
- Old Surehand (1965) – Surehand's Scout (voice, uncredited)
- Maigret and His Greatest Case (1966) – René Delfosse
- Final PMP (1968)
- Detectives (1969) – Sebastian West
- Love Is Colder Than Death (1969) – Bruno
- Your Caresses (1969) – Stefan / Brother
- The American Soldier (1970) – Tony le Gitano
- Der gelbe Koffer (1970) – The Composer
- Anglia (1970)
- Rio das Mortes (1971, TV Movie) – Autohändler
- Whity (1971) – Frank Nicholson
- Beware of a Holy Whore (1971) – Korbinian, Aufnahmeleiter
- Haytabo (1971) – (uncredited)
- The Italian Connection (1972) – Dancer
- The Sensuous Three (1972) – Raymond
- Adolf und Marlene (1973) – Hans Grans (voice, uncredited)
- World on a Wire (1973, TV Mini-Series) – Rupp, Journalist
- Effi Briest (1974) – Major Crampas
- Con la música a otra parte (1974) – The Composer
- Shadow of Angels (1976) – Der kleine Prinz / Little Prince
- Satan's Brew (1976) – Lauf
- Chinese Roulette (1976) – Kolbe
- Adolf und Marlene (1977) – Joseph Goebbels
- Ausgerechnet Bananen (1978) – Max
- Blank Generation (1980) – Hoffritz
- Olivia (1983) – The Detective
- Boogeyman II (1983) – Mickey Lombard
- Strangers in Paradise (1984) – Jonathan Sage / Hitler
- Revenge of the Stolen Stars (1986) – Max Stern
- Hors Saison (1992) – Prof. Malini
- Sex Crimes (1992) – Davis
- Every Minute Is Goodbye (1996) – Teddy
- Bloodsuckers (1997) – Angelo / Santano
- September Song (2001) – Valentin Reiner
- Daniel – Der Zauberer (2004) – Johnny
- Zombie Nation (2004) – Dr. Melnitz
- Absolute Evil (2009) – Rick
- Melancholie der Engel (2009) – Katze als Engel (voice)
- Shpion (2012) – Josef 'Sepp' Dietrich
- Carcinoma (2014) – Krankenpfleger
- Mondo Americana (2015) – Ulli
- Julia 17 - (2017) – Mysterious Director
- Factory Cowboys: Working with Warhol (2018) – Himself
- Queen of Rio (2018) – Rick
- Genus X (2018) – Chief Commander

=== As producer ===
- Anglia (1970)
- Whity (1971)
- Con la música a otra parte (1975)
- The Boogeyman (1980)
- Fassbinder in Hollywood (2002)
- Daniel – Der Zauberer (2004)
