= Suzanna Love =

American actress (born 1950)

- Born: April 8, 1950 (age 76); New York City, U.S.
- Occupations: Actress; screenwriter
- Years active: 1979–1991
- Spouse: Ulli Lommel (m. 1978; div. 1987)
- Parents: Kennett Love; Felicité Pratt

Suzanna Potter Love (born April 8, 1950) is an American former actress and screenwriter known for her collaborations with her husband, director Ulli Lommel, in the 1980s. She starred in Lommel's supernatural slasher film The Boogeyman (1980) and the psychological thriller Olivia (1983); she also co-wrote and starred in Lommel's horror films BrainWaves (1982) and The Devonsville Terror (1983). She had minor appearances in Lommel's science fiction musical film Strangers in Paradise (1984) and Revenge of the Stolen Stars (1985) before retiring from acting.

== Early life ==
Love was born in New York City on April 8, 1950, to Marie Felicité (née Pratt; 1926–2002) and Kennett Love (1924–2013). Her father, originally from St. Louis, Missouri, was a correspondent for The New York Times, and covered international affairs extensively in the 1950s. Her mother was a descendant of Charles Pratt, who founded the Pratt Institute. Love is a Standard Oil heiress.

Love and her siblings were raised Roman Catholic. She attended the Stuart Country Day School of the Sacred Heart in Princeton, New Jersey, and later enrolled at Vassar College. After dropping out of college after her second year of studies, Love relocated to London, and for a brief period became addicted to heroin. After becoming sober, she returned to the United States, and decided to embark on an acting career.

== Acting career ==
Her career in films began with a minor part in Hair (1979) under the stage name Suki Love. Shortly before, she had met director Ulli Lommel while he was auditioning actresses for his first film in the United States. The two began both a romantic and professional relationship and were married in New York City on January 26, 1978. Love subsequently starred in several of Lommel's films throughout the late 1970’s and early 1980s, beginning with Blank Generation, followed by Cocaine Cowboys (1979) and would co-write and headline his hit horror film The Boogeyman (1980). In The Boogeyman, Love co-starred alongside her brother, Nicholas, who portrayed her character's brother in the film.

She further appeared in four films for Lommel, all released in 1983: the psychological thriller Olivia; the science fiction film BrainWaves; the horror film Boogeyman II; and the supernatural horror film The Devonsville Terror, the last of which she co-wrote with Lommel.

In 1984, Love appeared in Lommel's satirical science fiction musical film Strangers in Paradise, in which she portrayed a punk singer, followed by the comedy Revenge of the Stolen Stars (1985).

== Later life ==
Love has largely remained out of the public eye since retiring from acting in 1991, though she did collaborate with Vinegar Syndrome in 2020, providing an on-camera interview for their Blu-ray release of Olivia. In 2023, further footage from the 2020 interview was included in the company's Blu-ray releases of The Devonsville Terror and The Boogeyman.

== Filmography ==
Year	Title	Role	Notes	Ref.
1979	Hair	Debutante #2		
1979	Cocaine Cowboys	Lucy		
1980	Blank Generation	Lizzy		
1980	The Boogeyman	Lacey		
1983	Olivia	Olivia	Also known as: Prozzie, or Double Jeopardy	
1983	BrainWaves	Kaylie Bedford	Also known as: Shadow of Death	
1983	Boogeyman II	Lacey	Also known as: Revenge of the Boogeyman	
1983	The Devonsville Terror	Jenny Scanlon		
1984	Strangers in Paradise	Sukey		
1985	Revenge of the Stolen Stars	Kelly		
1991	A Smile in the Dark			

== Sources ==
- Albright, Brian (2012). Regional Horror Films, 1958-1990: A State-by-State Guide with Interviews. McFarland. ISBN 978-0-78647-227-7.
- Frentzen, Jeff (April 12, 1998). "Ulli Lommel: Stranger in Paradise". Video Watchdog. Vol. 44. Cincinnati, Ohio: Starbrite. pp. 26–49. ISSN 1070-9991.
- Weldon, Michael (1996). The Psychotronic Video Guide To Film. New York City, New York: Macmillan. ISBN 978-0-312-13149-4.
- Young, R. G., ed. (2000). The Encyclopedia of Fantastic Film: Ali Baba to Zombies. New York City, New York: Applause Books. ISBN 978-1-557-83269-6.
