= The Boogey Man =

1980 film by Ulli Lommel

- Theatrical release poster
- Directed by: Ulli Lommel
- Written by: Ulli Lommel
- Produced by: Ulli Lommel; Gillian Gordon
- Starring: Suzanna Love; John Carradine; Ron James; Nicholas Love
- Cinematography: Jochen Breitenstein
- Edited by: Terrell Tannen
- Music by: Tim Krog
- Distributed by: The Jerry Gross Organization
- Release date: August 29, 1980
- Running time: 82 minutes
- Country: United States
- Language: English
- Budget: $321,000–$350,000
- Box office: $25 million (Note: Sources vary regarding the film's total box office gross. In an interview with director Lommel for Video Watchdog in 1998, he claimed the film grossed $25 million. This figure is restated in Adam Rockoff's 2011 book Going to Pieces: The Rise and Fall of the Slasher Film, in which he notes the film "supposedly grossed more than $25 million worldwide." In the 1987 book American Film Distribution: The Changing Marketplace, a total North American gross of $2.1 million is cited.)

The Boogey Man is a 1980 American supernatural slasher film written and directed by Ulli Lommel, and starring Suzanna Love, John Carradine, and Ron James. The film's title refers to the superstition of boogeymen, and its plot concerns two siblings who are targeted by the ghost of their mother's deceased boyfriend, which has been freed from a mirror.

Released theatrically on August 29, 1980 by independent distributor The Jerry Gross Organization, it received mixed to negative reviews, with critics decrying its strong similarities to earlier horror films such as Halloween, The Exorcist, and The Amityville Horror. The film was followed by two sequels: Boogeyman II and Return of the Boogeyman.

== Plot ==
Young siblings Willy and Lacey watch their mother and boyfriend kissing in her bedroom. When their mother notices them, she has her boyfriend tie Willy to his headboard before sending Lacey to her room. Lacey frees Willy from his bed, and Willy enters their room and repeatedly stabs his mother's boyfriend with a chef’s knife in front of a large mirror.

Twenty years later, Lacey is married with a young son and lives with her aunt and uncle on a farm. Willy also lives with them but has been mute since the night he killed his mother's boyfriend. Lacey finds a letter in the mail from her mother, who claims to be on her deathbed and wishes to see them one last time, but Willy burns the letter.

Lacey suffers from nightmares and has a particularly frightening dream where she is dragged, tied to a bed, and almost stabbed by an unseen entity. Her husband, Jake, takes her to a psychiatrist to help her confront her fears and decides to visit the house where she grew up. There, they meet two teenage girls and their younger brother. Their parents have just placed the home for sale and then gone out of town. Mistaken by the children for potential buyers, Lacey and Jake use the opportunity to explore the house. In the bedroom where the murder took place, Lacey sees a reflection of her mother's boyfriend coming towards her in a mirror and smashes it with a chair. Jake takes the broken mirror with him to repair it, but a piece is left behind that later glows red. Shortly after the couple leaves, the three siblings are all violently killed by an unseen force; the vengeful spirit of the deceased lover has been released from the mirror.

Willy similarly has disturbing visions involving mirrors, leading him to paint all the mirrors in the house black. Later, pieces of a broken mirror cause a pitchfork to levitate and nearly impale him. A shard from the shattered mirror is accidentally tracked outside, where it reflects light across a lake to where a group of teenagers is partying by an abandoned house. A skewer impales a couple kissing in their car, while another couple drives off and leaves them. Soon afterward, Lacey flees to the house, and her shirt supernaturally begins to tear. She discovers her aunt and uncle are dead.

Later, Jake brings the family priest to investigate the mirror. When the priest's hand touches the mirror, it suddenly turns red. A piece of the mirror floats across the room and becomes lodged over Lacey's eye, letting the ghost possess her body. Controlling Lacey's body, the ghost nearly kills her husband and attacks the priest. Before he dies, the priest removes the shard from Lacey's eye, releasing her from the ghost's control, and throws it into the kitchen sink, where it bursts into flames as it touches the water. The remainder of the mirror is then thrown into a well, and an explosion releases the trapped souls and destroys the mirror once and for all.

The film ends with Lacey, Willy, and Kevin visiting the graveyard. After they leave, the final shard of the mirror, which had gotten stuck to her son's shoe, glows red.

== Cast ==
- Suzanna Love as Lacey
- Ron James as Jake
- John Carradine as Dr. Warren
- Nicholas Love as Willy
- Raymond Boyden as Kevin
- Ernest Meier III as Peter

== Analysis ==
Though the film has been noted as stylistically imitating John Carpenter's Halloween (1978), critic Jeff Franzen notes that the film possess a subtext that is filled with "multi-layered references to Lommel's childhood and fears, much of which lingers long after you forget about the gimmicky gore". Franzen asserts that one of the film's central themes is "that people conspire to hide the truth, although to one or more characters the truth is obvious".

== Production ==
=== Development ===
"[Something like] Frankenstein's castle is so far removed from our everyday experiences that it's easy to say, 'Oh yeah, well, that's a horror movie'. In The Boogeyman and The Tenderness of Wolves, I thought it's much more interesting to use familiar settings, like a living room or a bedroom".

— Lommel on the film's setting

The film uses several apparent pieces of folklore and superstition regarding mirrors: In addition to the superstition that it is bad luck to break a mirror, the film also discusses the belief that breaking a mirror releases everything the mirror has ever "seen"; further, placing the pieces of a broken mirror into a bag and burying it will counteract the bad luck from breaking the mirror. Additionally, there is the belief that a mirror in a room where someone has died will show the dead person looking back over the shoulder of anyone looking into the mirror. All this is referenced in the Mexican translation of the film title, released as "El espejo asesino" ("the killer mirror").

Stylistically, Lommel stated that he wanted to make a "movie about outrageous killings set in an average-looking environment with ordinary actors. First establish things an audience can identify with, then inject the horror into a normal environment".

=== Filming ===
Filming took place on location in the Waldorf, Maryland area, with additional photography in Los Angeles, California. Lommel cited the film's production budget as $321,000 in a 1980 Los Angeles Times interview, though he estimated it cost $350,000 in a 1998 article published by Video Watchdog.

== Release ==
The film was given a limited theatrical release in the United States by The Jerry Gross Organization on August 29, 1980 in Indiana, Kentucky, Ohio, and Wisconsin. (Note: The earliest showtime listings available from archival newspaper sources are dated Friday, August 29, 1980, with listings in Indianapolis, Indiana; Lexington, Kentucky; Cleveland, Ohio; and Racine, Wisconsin. It later screened in the fall of 1980 in other cities, including Portland, Oregon, and Tucson, Arizona, among others.) The film continued to screen theatrically through the fall of 1980 in numerous U.S. cities. It had its Los Angeles opening later into the year on November 19, 1980.

It was released in the United Kingdom by Miracle Films in 1981 under the title The Bogey Man as a double bill with the 1978 Canadian film Blackout.

=== Home media ===
The film was released on VHS in the United States by Wizard Video in 1981. The film has been released on DVD twice in North America: in 1999 by Anchor Bay Entertainment alongside Lommel's The Devonsville Terror (1983), and by Sony Pictures Home Entertainment in 2005 alongside Lommel's Return of the Boogeyman (1994). In July 2023, Vinegar Syndrome released a 4K UHD Blu-ray edition of the film.

In the United Kingdom, The Boogey Man was placed on the DPP list in 1984, but was rereleased on the Vipco label in 1992 in a cut form. An uncut version of the film was released in 2000. 88 Films released a Blu-ray edition in the United Kingdom in 2015.

== Reception ==
=== Box office ===
The film grossed approximately $25 million, though little of its significant income went to the filmmakers and performers, as the Jerry Gross Company, the film's distributor, was in the midst of bankruptcy at the time of its release.

=== Critical response ===
Critical reception for The Boogey Man has been mixed to negative.

On the review aggregator website Rotten Tomatoes, 33% of 9 critics' reviews are positive, with an average rating of 4.1/10.

Garry Arnold from The Washington Post wrote in his review on the film: "The Boogey Man achieves a certain vicious distinction by putting the occasional spectacular kink in an otherwise motley fabric." Ron Cowan of the Statesman Journal criticized the film for boasting "little originality in storyline or style, relying instead on the sheer energy and determination it brings to bloodletting". Bruce Bailey of the Montreal Gazette wrote: "This film is so sick, it ought to be hospitalized–permanently. The Boogey Man mixes a bit of sex with standard shock devices, primordial fears and Freudian jealousies. It blends them into something which is tawdry, rather than a good old-fashioned spine-tingler".

Ted Mahar of The Oregonian called the film a "cut-and-paste" suspense film, expressly accusing it of copying numerous stylistic elements of John Carpenter's Halloween (1978). A similar observation was made by Miami Herald critic Bill Cosford, who also noted similarities to Halloween and critiquing the film's performances as "hopelessly flat."

The film did receive praise from Linda Gross of the LA Times, who described it as a "scary, well-made horror film," and praised its suspense, ultimately summarizing: "In spite of the lapses, The Boogey Man is a powerful Grand Guignol evocation of the horror of a brother and sister inexorably locked together by destiny." Film critic Leonard Maltin also gave the film a favorable 3/4 stars, writing: "German art film actor-director Lommel lends unconventional angle to this combination of The Exorcist and Halloween. Effects are quite colorful, if somewhat hokey".

== Sequels ==
Boogeyman II was filmed in 1981, but unreleased until 1983. Directed by Bruce Starr and an uncredited Ulli Lommel, it was written by Starr, Lommel and the original film's star, Suzanna Love, although the writing goes uncredited in the film. In Boogeyman 2, Lacey is approached by a group of Hollywood phonies to make a movie based on her experiences. Lacey travels to Hollywood, to the home of a film director (played by Ulli Lommel himself), where she brings along the last surviving haunted mirror shard from the end of the first movie as proof to her horrifying experiences. One by one, the phonies are killed by the mirror spirit who possesses the body of the director's manservant. Boogeyman 2 is padded with many flashback sequences from the first film.

Return of the Boogeyman (or Boogeyman 3) was released on May 5, 1994, and is largely constructed around numerous flashbacks to The Boogeyman as well.

In 2016, Hollywood Action House began developing Boogeyman Chronicles, a series of eight 45-min. episodes. The series started with the first episode airing on Halloween 2018 worldwide. It is inspired by Ulli Lommel's 1980 cult hit The Boogey Man. The new storyline was developed after test audiences in the US and Europe saw various cuts of a series of plot-possibilities and characters entitled Boogeyman: Reincarnation. The writing team headed by Colin McCracken is currently working on episodes 2 - 8 with the plan to create a total of up to 64 episodes. Lommel has indicated that, even though he directed episode 1, most of the remaining episodes will be directed by a series of young directors from the US, Europe and Asia. Starring in episode 1 are Skylar Radzion, Laurence R. Harvey, Andreea Boyer and Tristan Risk. It was produced by Frank Dragun, Ulli Lommel and David Bond.

== Sources ==
- Donahue, Suzanne Mary (1987). American Film Distribution: The Changing Marketplace. Ann Arbor, Michigan: UMI Research Press. ISBN 978-0-835-71776-2.
- Franzen, Jeff (1998). "Ulli Lommel: Stranger in Paradise". Video Watchdog. Vol. 44. Cincinnati, Ohio: Starbrite. pp. 26–49. ISSN 1070-9991.
- Pratt, Douglas (2004). Doug Pratt's DVD: Movies, Television, Music, Art, Adult, and More!. Vol. 1. New York City, New York: Harbor Electronic Pub. ISBN 978-1-932-91600-3.
- Rockoff, Adam (2011) [2002]. Going to Pieces: The Rise and Fall of the Slasher Film, 1978-1986. Jefferson, North Carolina: McFarland & Company. ISBN 978-0-786-46932-1.
