= Boogeyman II =

- Boogeyman II
- Directed by: Bruce Pearn ("Bruce Starr"); Ulli Lommel (uncredited); Paul Willson (uncredited)
- Written by: Ulli Lommel (uncredited); Suzanna Love (uncredited); Bruce Pearn (uncredited)
- Produced by: Ulli Lommel; Bruce Pearn
- Starring: Suzanna Love; Ulli Lommel; Shannah Hall
- Cinematography: Philippe Carr-Foster; David Sperling
- Edited by: Terrell Tannen
- Music by: Tim Krog
- Production company: New West Films
- Distributed by: VCII Home Entertainment
- Release dates: August 24, 1983 (United States); 1984 (West Germany, VHS)
- Running time: 79 minutes (premiere); 83 minutes (extended)
- Country: United States
- Language: English

Boogeyman II (known as Revenge of the Boogeyman in the United Kingdom) is a 1983 American horror film directed by Ulli Lommel and starring Suzanna Love, Ulli Lommel, and Shannah Hall. It is a sequel to the 1980 film The Boogey Man. Like its predecessor, the film was banned in the United Kingdom as a "video nasty" during the 1980s.

== Plot ==
Lacey travels to LA to consult a film producer about making a feature film based on the supernatural events she experienced involving a malevolent spirit trapped in a mirror. Lacey unwittingly breaks a glass from the mirror, with dire consequences.

== Cast ==
- Suzanna Love as Lacey
- Shannah Hall as Bonnie
- Sholto von Douglas as Joseph
- Ulli Lommel as Mickey
- Bob Rosenfarb as Bernie
- Rhonda Aldrich as Cynthia
- John Carradine as Dr. Warren (archive footage)
