= Paul Willson =

American actor

- Education: Reed College
- Occupation: Actor
- Years active: 1970–present

Paul Willson (born December 25, 1945) is an American film, television and voice actor who played Paul Krapence on Cheers, Leonard Smith on It's Garry Shandling's Show and Bob Porter in Office Space.

== Early life ==
Willson was raised in San Francisco, California. He attended Reed College in Portland, Oregon, where he began performing in improvisational theatre.

== Career ==
Willson has appeared on shows including Laverne & Shirley as Eraserhead in episode "A Date with Eraserhead", and Full House as Stu in episode "Crimes and Michelle's Demeanor" in 1990, Curb Your Enthusiasm, Boston Public, Caroline in the City, The Newsroom and Star Trek: Voyager. He played guest character Paul Krapence on the television show Cheers (which he also reprised in an episode of the Cheers spin-off, Frasier). His character was originally called Gregg because Paul Vaughn was already playing a character named "Paul" on the show. He has also appeared on the tv show Malcolm in the Middle.

For five years (1986-1990) he was Garry Shandling's neighbor Leonard Smith on It's Garry Shandling's Show. Willson also appeared on Garry Shandling's The Larry Sanders Show playing Larry's accountant, and the brother of Sid the cue card holder.

His film appearances include The Pack (1977), The Devonsville Terror (1983), My Best Friend Is a Vampire (1987), Moving (1988), 976-EVIL (1988), Problem Child 2 (1991), Circuitry Man (1990), Plughead Rewired: Circuitry Man II (1994) and the comedy film Office Space (1999) as one of "The Bobs".

He has also done voice work as Sam Detweiler, T.J.'s father in Disney's Recess and in the 2001 feature film Recess: School's Out. Cheers producer Ken Levine has described Willson as "one of the greatest improv artists I have EVER seen."

== Filmography ==
=== Television ===
Year	Title	Role	Notes
1985–1993	Cheers	Paul Krapence	Recurring role
1990	The Simpsons	Florist	Episode: "Some Enchanted Evening", voice role
1997	The Magic School Bus	Ed Tennelli	2 Episodes: "Cracks a Yolk" "Gets Charged", voice role
2000, 2002, 2004	Malcolm in the Middle	Ed	Recurring role (Season 1); Guest role (Seasons 3 and 5); 4 episodes
2014	The Big Bang Theory	Professor Sharpe	Episode "The Champagne Reflection"
