= Todd Keeler-Wolf =

American botanist

Todd Keeler-Wolf is a California botanist and ecologist who co-developed the Sawyer and Keeler-Wolf classification system of vegetation types.

He is Senior Vegetation Ecologist at the California Department of Fish and Game and headed the Vegetation Classification and Mapping Program. He was Program Director of the California Native Plant Society’s Vegetation Program. He is the author of numerous books and academic publications. He wrote Introduction to California Plant Life with Robert Ornduff and Phyllis M. Faber, and co-edited Terrestrial Vegetation of California with Alan A. Schoenherr and Michael Barbour.

== Selected publications ==
- Introduction to California Plant Life with Robert Ornduff and Phyllis M. Faber
- Manual of California vegetation, with John O. Sawyer and Julie Evens, 2009
- Terrestrial Vegetation of California ed., with Michael G. Barbour and Alan A. Schoenherr
