= Debris documentar =

2003 experimental independent dramatic art film by Marian Dora

DVD cover

Debris documentar (English: Debris Documentation) is a 75-minute 2012 German-language experimental independent dramatic art film, made in 2003 by Marian Dora.

== Synopsis ==
The film, released on DVD in 2014 as part of a boxset also containing Melancholie der Engel (2009) and Reise nach Agatis (2010), deals with the everyday life of a man, Carsten (Carsten Frank), who works on the set of the 2004 Ulli Lommel film Zombie Nation. At the same time, he is planning to realize his own film, a task he finds extremely difficult. First, he tries to place casting ads in a supermarket. During his daily work on the film set, the man seems frustrated. Also, he is isolated in his private life, and spends his time by watching and masturbating to his opulent VHS film collection of homosexual rape pornography and films such as Cesare Canevari's 1977 Gestapo's Last Orgy, Dennis Donnelly's 1978 The Toolbox Murders, Werner Herzog's 1974 The Enigma of Kaspar Hauser, Peter Schamoni's 1976 Montana Trap, and Rino Di Silvestro's 1976 Werewolf Woman, and tinkering with props for his own planned film. He also likes to read Astrid Proll's works about Andreas Baader and Ulrike Meinhof and the writings of Eduard Mörike. In his spare time, he shoots photos of animal cadavers while playing with them, also partly collecting them to take home with him, as he seems to have sexual attraction to them, and rapes women (Martina Adora, Stefanie Müller, and Carina Palmer) in the woods while they urinate. He indulges in several disturbing sexual fetishes including defecating, urinating, necrophilia, bestiality, anal fisting, rape, murder, nose-picking, and other unspeakable acts. He is in regular contact with a prostitute, Patrizia (Patrizia Johann), who puts an enema into her anus and defecates into a bucket while placing the man onto a table, shoving her fist into his anus and pulling feces out of there while he is putting the bucket to his face. By telephone, he also stays in contact with Jesús Franco, Katja Bienert, Peter Martell, and David Hess (who composed most of this film's score). After a while, he actually contacted a woman, Franziska (Alexandra Dumas), who read his advertisement in the supermarket. They arrange a meeting in the man's house. When he tells her what he is supposed to do in his film, the woman gets scared and wants to leave the house. Then, Carsten overwhelms her and kills her by strangling her with a telephone cord and beating her head. Afterwards, he films himself as he is sexually aroused by her corpse. He cuts her nipples off in graphic detail and uses his scalpel to cut the dead woman's clitoris off. He then takes the scalpel and peels the skin off one of her fingers and eats the pieces of dismembered skin. The film ends with a scene showing Carsten burning the same woman's body and going jogging, as in the first shot of this film.
