= Green River Killer (film) =

- DVD release cover (USA)
- Directed by: Ulli Lommel
- Written by: Ulli Lommel
- Produced by: Nola Roeper
- Starring: George Kiseleff; Jaquelyn Aurora; Shannon Leade; Naidra Dawn Thomson
- Cinematography: Ulli Lommel
- Edited by: Christian Behm
- Music by: Robert J. Walsh
- Production companies: Heidenheim Films; The Shadow Factory Inc.
- Distributed by: Lionsgate Home Entertainment; Snp
- Release date: June 13, 2005
- Running time: 83 minutes
- Country: United States
- Language: English

Green River Killer is a 2005 American crime film by Ulli Lommel starring George Kiseleff, Jaquelyn Aurora (as Jacquelyn Horrell), Georgina Donovan, Shannon Leade, Naidra Dawn Thomson, and Shawn G. Smith. It is based upon the crimes of serial killer Gary Ridgway.

== Plot ==
Based on the true story of serial murderer Gary Ridgway, the film depicts how he would approach prostitutes in bars, take them to his homes, brutally kill them and throw the corpses into the Green River, a pattern of behavior which explains his sobriquet, "Green River Killer." Soon, however, the police are on his track.

== Cast ==
- George Kiseleff – Gary Ridgway
- Jaquelyn Aurora – Hedy
- Georgina Donovan
- Shannon Leade – Anna
- Naidra Dawn Thomson – Irene
- Shawn G. Smith – Coworker #1
- Kimko – Coworker #2
- Sebastien Szumilas – Kevin
- Bud Watson – Defense Attorney
- Carsten Frank – Boris

== Filming ==
The documentary footage is of the real Gary Ridgway confessing to the killings.

The flashback of Ridgway's fictional "mentor," Boris, has a distinctly different look and atmosphere compared with the rest of the movie. That is because the footage was not shot by director Ulli Lommel but by German actor-director "Marian Dora," a pseudonym for the physician who began making gory horror films around the same time Lommel directed Green River Killer. Dora made Cannibal – Aus dem Tagebuch des Kannibalen, for example. Dora, who also worked on Lommel's Zombie Nation, in this flashback directs actor Carsten Frank as he strangles a woman.

Green River Killer was the second in a series of direct-to-DVD titles directed by Lommel and released by Lions Gate Entertainment under its Artisan label. The first was Zodiac Killer (2005). Green River Killer would soon to be followed by BTK Killer (2005) and Killer Pickton (2005). Other direct-to-DVD movies directed by Lommel and featuring serial killers would follow in 2007 and 2008.

Ridgway's home in the movie, which is a residence located in Marina del Rey, California, was also the house inhabited by "Producer McCoon" in Black Dahlia (2006).
