= Death in Rome =

Novel by Wolfgang Koeppen

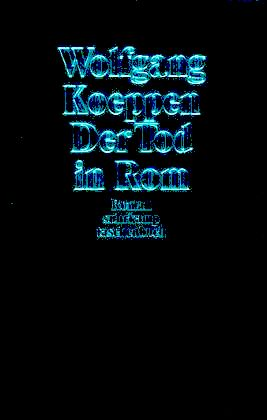
- Book cover
- Author: Wolfgang Koeppen
- Original title: Der Tod in Rom
- Language: German
- Genre: Novel
- Set in: Rome, post-WWII
- Publisher: Stuttgart: Scherz und Goverts Verlag
- Publication date: 1954
- Publication place: Germany
- Media type: Print: Hardback
- Pages: 187
- ISBN: 9783518019146
- OCLC: 907595620

Death in Rome (German: Der Tod in Rom) is a 1954 German novel by Wolfgang Koeppen. Koeppen belonged to the literary generation of West Germany, which revived the devastated cultural landscape after twelve years of fascism and the ruin caused by the Second World War. Koeppen was one of the first artists to shine light upon the new social and political realities of the country at a time of chauvinistic and revanchist backlash. The novel explores themes associated with the Holocaust, German guilt, the conflict between the generations, and the silencing of the past.

The novel is the third work of the so-called Trilogy of Failure (German: Trilogie des Scheiterns), about postwar life in West Germany. It succeeds Pigeons on the Grass (German: Tauben im Gras, 1951), which recreates a typical day in Munich in 1948; and The Hothouse (German: Das Treibhaus, 1953), which deals with the corruption of the Bonn government. With this trilogy, Koeppen established himself as an important figure in German post-war literature.

Death in Rome opens with an epigraph from Canto III of Dante Alighieri's Inferno: Il mal seme d'Adamo, followed by the last sentence from Death in Venice: "Und noch desselben Tages empfing eine respektvoll erschütterte Welt die Nachricht von seinem Tode."

== Synopsis ==
=== Context ===
Death in Rome deals with the careers of former National Socialists after World War II. The novel is sharply critical of Germany's past, post-war reality and future, sounding a warning and a prophetic note. Koeppen targets German militarism, revealing the dangerous influence of fascist ideology on certain West German social strata.

The story, of victims and perpetrators from the time of National Socialism meeting during the post-war period, takes place against the backdrop of Rome. The city also functions as a metaphor, its ancient monuments predisposing the reader to reflect on the fate of the world, the nature of good and evil, war and peace, the past and the future, wealth and poverty, justice and social oppression. The author composes new groups from the members of two families and their surroundings, and choreographs their story in several parallel lines of action. Through a network of dialogues and inner monologues, the present is problematized and the past uncovered. The characters embody the opportunism and adaptability of the followers; the unbroken violence of the perpetrators; and the devastation and escapism of the next generation.

In the background is the unresolved problem of overcoming the past of National Socialism in the time of the Wirtschaftswunder. The novel has a particular connection with Thomas Mann's Death in Venice (German: Der Tod in Venedig, 1912), most notably in addressing the problems of artistic creativity against a background of moral decay. Stylistically, Death in Rome is similar to Koeppen's two other novels, characterized by a mastery of metaphorical, associative prose and use of the devices of cinema. These include the staging, constant changes in point of view and distance to the depicted event, and the simultaneously unfolding action. Epic narrative is coupled with the characters' internal monologue, which, according to the author, "best suits our perception, our consciousness, and our bitter experience".

The author demonstrates his political and social engagement as a writer in Death in Rome. In his 1962 speech on receiving the Georg Büchner Prize, he said:

But I saw the poet, the writer for those excluded by society, I saw him as a sufferer, compassionate, outraged, a regulator of all secular order, I recognized him as the spokesman of the poor, as the advocate of the oppressed, as the champion of human rights against the tormentors of men, himself railing against the cruelty of nature and an indifferent God. I later heard talk of engaged literature, and was astounded then by the idea of wanting to turn the self-evident, as obvious as breathing, into a special artistic direction or a fashion.

Koeppen does not advocate any particular ideology or political program. The words of one of the heroes of Death in Rome describe his works: "I ask questions, yet I do not know the answer, I cannot answer." Koeppen called his works "a monologue attempt against the world". Paradoxically, his protest against existence is also a plea for a new, more humane form of life, leading Alfred Andersch to describe him as a "humanistic pessimist". This hidden humanistic pathos, going beyond resignation, inspired the whole of his literary life. Of Death in Rome, Koeppen said: "We all live with politics, we are all its subjects or even victims of it ... How can the writer behave like the ostrich, and who, if not the writer, should take on the role of Cassandra in our society?"

=== Characters ===
- Gottlieb Judejahn: One of the novel's main characters, he is a Nazi criminal, a General of the Schutzstaffel and the Freikorps. Sentenced in absentia to death at the Nuremberg trials, he has nonetheless escaped retribution. Judejahn is a professional executioner, embodying all the misdeeds and barbarity of fascism. Yet he remains convinced that he did the right thing by killing and destroying people. He recalls images of his victims with sadistic delight, and takes refuge in these memories when unhappy with his present life. Judejahn believes himself a hero, incarnating all German virtues and the fulfillment of duty to the "deity of power", Adolf Hitler. Judejahn escaped to an Arab country, whose military he is trying to build up in order to defeat Israel. He is in Rome to buy weapons, and to meet members of his family, including his wife, Eva.
- Eva Judejahn: Gottlieb Judejahn's wife. Eva is portrayed as a "Nordic Erinye", dreaming of the revival of the Third Reich, the triumph of the "millennial empire", and German world domination. Her husband, whom she blindly worships, prefers to socialize with the "fallen heroes", the "martyrs" of Nazism, rather than with the survivors, but those heroes have lost their power and majesty.
- Adolf Judejahn: Son of Gottlieb and Eva Judejahn. Adolf has replaced the SS uniform with the cassock, having sought support and salvation in the Catholic Church after the collapse of the fascist myth. Afraid to make any personal decisions, he tries to rise above all parties, in the name of "all-human tolerance". But the young man cannot free himself from the thought that the Church has been linked to fascist doctrine and has, in fact, been supporting this "assassin gang". Adolf, like his relative Siegfried Pfaffrath, represents the generation of sons who do not want to follow in their fathers' footsteps. Both Siegfried, the composer, and Adolf, the cleric, seek new goals and a new meaning for their lives. Both know the exalted suffering of loneliness.
- Laura: A barmaid working in a gay bar. She is pursued by Judejahn. Although being Catholic, Judejahn fantasises about her being Jewish.
- Friedrich Wilhelm Pfaffrath: A kinsman of the General, and another significant character in the novel. At first glance, a very orderly man. Once president and manager of large Nazi properties, and a member of the German bourgeoisie unconditionally accepting Hitler's authority, he is now a high-ranking public official. He was elected the first mayor, and head, of his town. There are many others like him, who have penetrated all corners of the Bonn state apparatus. Occupying leadership positions, these people are redefining the country's destiny. Pfaffrath is genuine, devoid of demonism, yet no less ominous than Gottlieb Judejahn. He wants to help the former hangman return to the Federal Republic with impunity and integrate into the Bonn political system. Pfaffrath believes that West German society is mature enough to accept the "prodigal son" who has escaped the gallows. Thus, Pfaffrath embodies the vitality of nationalism in the country.
- Anna Pfaffrath: Eva's sister, married to Friedrich Wilhelm Pfaffrath.
- Dietrich Pfaffrath: A law student, and the youngest member of the Pfaffrath family. Dietrich's story confirms the inescapable nature of his father Friedrich Wilhelm's social status. Dietrich is a promising careerist, untroubled by moral dilemmas or thoughts about his father's fascist past. Even Gottlieb Judejahn does not interfere in his life. The calculating Dietrich understands that his kinship with the former general might one day be seen as honorable and prove to be profitable. Koeppen portrays Dietrich as a symbol of resurgent loyalty, with its roots in order, the state, and power.
- Siegfried Pfaffrath: A composer, homosexual, and pederast who frequents boy prostitutes. He has left his father's house behind and taken up residence in Rome to distance himself from his German relatives. Siegfried is presented as a hero, juxtaposed against the vivid, negative images of the other characters. He is perhaps the primary hero of the novel, in large part because he embodies some autobiographical elements of the author. Siegfried seeks to express his worldview and musicality using Arnold Schoenberg's twelve-tone technique, lambasted during the Third Reich. Siegfried loves Rome because he feels foreign there, and yet he is intensely lonely, constantly on the brink of despair. This raw feeling infuses his music. He composes works deliberately devoid of harmony, expressing his image of a world in which he has overcome the danger of an irreparable crash. For Siegfried, music expresses the horror of man in the era of gas chambers and mass murder. His works are a "rebellion against the surrounding reality", against his fatherland, and against the war for which people like his parents were responsible. Siegfried's music mocks the tastes of the wealthy self-styled patrons and connoisseurs of art who occupy the ground floor of the concert hall. He dreams of understanding and accepting the young people, the workers, and the students to whom the future belongs. But at his concert, those in the gallery do not accept the composer, or perceive the resonance and life in his symphony. His music reflects the tragedy of a talented artist unable to break through the limitations of denial and develop constructive ideas. Although Siegfried wins a prize at a modern music competition, he is unhappy with this result. He does not applaud his symphony; only the rich snobs from the ground floor do so. Yet the young composer places great hope in his work: perhaps his music will be judged "with time to contribute to great changes". Siegfried's loneliness drives him to finds a way out of Rome. He leaves for Africa, hoping one day to return from Africa to New York City having composed a "black symphony" – a symbol of commitment to the inborn problems of mankind.
- Kürenberg: The world-renowned conductor who presents Siegfried's first symphony to an audience. He perceives the dissonant work as a "no-goal search", conquered by despair. The conductor, who feels the artist's dissatisfaction with his work, protects Siegfried from the danger of closing himself off in an ivory tower because of disappointment with the world.
- Ilse Kürenberg: Kürenberg's wife. She cannot explain whether Siegfried is desperate because he cannot find a path to a meaningful life, or even if his despair hinders him all the way. Ilse, who is Jewish, survived the Holocaust as she and her Gentile husband could afford to live outside Germany during the war. At the end of the novel, Gottlieb shoots and kills Ilse, whose father had been victimized by the Nazis, before he himself suffers a heart attack.

== Influence ==
In Marian Dora's 2009 film, Melancholie der Engel, a dying man, Katze, is shown reading the book, and, upon dying, is buried with it.
