= Cannibal (disambiguation) =

A cannibal is an organism which eats others of its own species or kind.

Cannibal may also refer to:

- A person who engages in human cannibalism

== Films ==
- Cannibal! The Musical (1993), directed by South Park co-creator Trey Parker
- Cannibal (2004 film), an alternate title of Canadian horror movie White Skin
- Cannibal (2006 film), a German horror movie
- Cannibal (2010 film), a Belgian horror film
- Cannibal (2013 film), a Spanish-Romanian thriller
- Diary of a Cannibal, German-American film also known as Cannibal
- The Cannibals (1969 film), a.k.a. The Year of the Cannibals, an Italian drama
- The Cannibals (1988 film) (originally Os Canibais), a Portuguese drama

== Literature ==
- The Cannibal (DeMille novel), a 1975 Joe Ryker book by Nelson DeMille
- The Cannibal (Hawkes novel), a 1949 novel by John Hawkes
- The Cannibals, an unfinished novel by Stephen King, which was the inspiration for his novel Under the Dome
- The Cannibals, a 1968 play by George Tabori

== Music ==
- The Cannibals (band), a British garage punk band
- Cannibal (EP), a 2010 EP by Kesha, and its title song
  - "Cannibal" (Kesha song)
- Cannibal (Static-X album), 2007
- Cannibal (Wretched album), 2014
- Cannibal (Bury Tomorrow album), 2020
- "Cannibal" (Marcus Mumford song), 2022
- "Cannibal", a 1987 song by Buster Poindexter from Buster Poindexter
- "Cannibal", a 2014 song by Silversun Pickups from The Singles Collection
- "Cannibal", a 2011 song by Tally Hall from Good & Evil
- "Cannibal", a 2025 song by Underoath from The Place After This One
- "Cannibal", a 2024 song by VOLA from Friend of a Phantom
- "Cannibals", a 2017 song by Converge from The Dusk in Us
- "Cannibals", a 2020 song by Neil Cicierega from Mouth Dreams
- "Cannibals", a 1996 song by Mark Knopfler from Golden Heart

== People ==
- The Cannibal, a nickname for Belgian former professional cyclist Eddy Merckx (born 1945)
- The Cannibal, a nickname for Brazilian UFC fighter Alexandre Pantoja (born 1990)
- The Cannibal, a nickname for Dutch former professional footballer Khalid Boulahrouz (born 1981)

== Other uses ==
- Cannibal (camouflage)
- Cannibal (roller coaster), an amusement park attraction
- Cannibals (painting), a 2005 painting by Odd Nerdrum

== See also ==
- Monsieur Cannibale (disambiguation)
- Cannibalism (disambiguation)
- Cannibalization (disambiguation)
