= David Hess =

American actor and singer-songwriter (1936–2011)

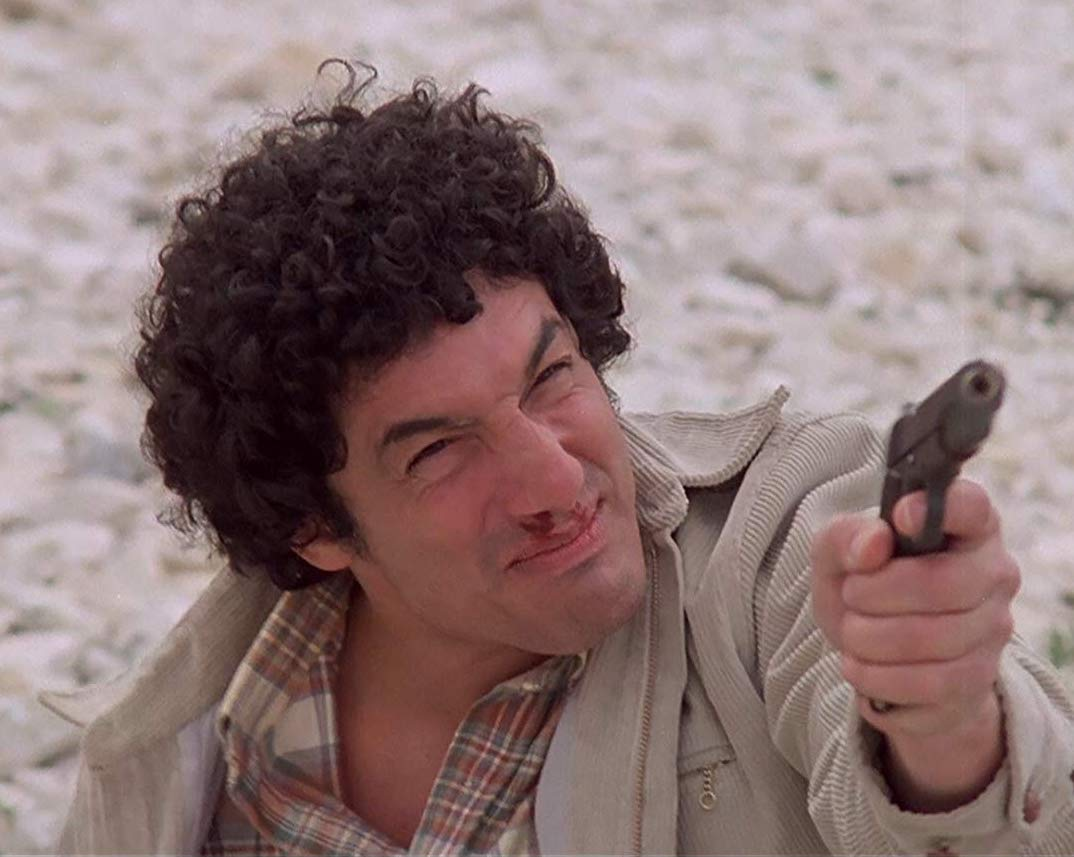
- Hess in Hitch-Hike (1977)
- Born: David Alexander Hess; September 19, 1936; New York City, U.S.
- Died: October 7, 2011 (aged 75); Tiburon, California, U.S.
- Other names: David Dante; David Hill
- Occupations: Actor; singer; songwriter; composer; director
- Years active: 1956–2011
- Spouse: Regina Mardek (m. 1978)
- Children: 4

David Alexander Hess (September 19, 1936 – October 7, 2011) was an American actor, singer, songwriter, and director. He came to prominence for his portrayals of murderous rapists, villains and gruff characters in several films in the 1970s and 1980s.

Hess originally worked as a songwriter in the 1950s, co-writing songs recorded by Elvis Presley and Pat Boone, but garnered international attention for his feature film debut portraying Krug Stillo in Wes Craven's exploitation horror film The Last House on the Left (1972). He played several hard-edged roles as criminals and rapists in the Italian films Hitch-Hike (1977) and The House on the Edge of the Park (1980) as well as a supporting role in Craven's Swamp Thing (1982). He made his directorial debut with the slasher film To All a Goodnight (1980).

In his later life, Hess was affiliated with the California Film Institute, where he taught improvisational theater in the institute's youth programs. He died of a heart attack on October 7, 2011, near his home in Tiburon, California, after attending a local concert.

== Early life ==
Hess was born David Alexander Hess on September 19, 1936, in New York City. His mother Marjory was an opera singer.

== Career ==
=== 1956–1971: Songwriting and music ===
In 1956, Hess recorded the original version of the Otis Blackwell composition "All Shook Up" under the stage name David Hill. The next year the song became a #1 hit single for Elvis Presley.

He began his professional career as a songwriter for Shalimar Music in 1957. He composed "Start Movin' (In My Direction)" for Sal Mineo and "Rockin' Shoes" for the Ames Brothers. In 1959, he recorded a cover version of Cliff Richard's "Living Doll" for Kapp Records, and it became a mild placed charter for him on the U.S. Billboard charts. He wrote songs for Elvis Presley throughout the 1950s and 1960s, which include "I Got Stung", "Come Along", and "Sand Castles". "Your Hand, Your Heart, Your Love" became a 1960s hit when it was performed by Andy Williams. In 1962, Hess wrote and recorded "Speedy Gonzales", (as David Dante) which became a #6 single for Pat Boone in the U.S. and a #2 in the UK, selling more than 8 million copies worldwide. Hess then recorded two solo albums for Kapp Records, again topping the charts, this time with a top 10 folk hit titled "Two Brothers."

In 1969, he became head of A&R at Mercury Records in New York. There he linked with Western classical composer John Corigliano, and together they wrote the rock opera The Naked Carmen, which received a Grammy nomination for Best Album Cover. It became a big hit of the Berlin Ballet Week in 1970. His work with Mercury included And the Children Toll the Passing of the Day, a 1969 album he wrote for Irish actor Malachy McCourt.

=== 1972–2011: Acting and film ===
In 1972, his career split into several new directions with his starring role in the Wes Craven horror classic The Last House on the Left, for which he also composed the soundtrack. In this movie, he was noted to have been a reckless, merciless character. In a 2008 Vanity Fair article, Hess admitted threatening co-star Sandra Peabody, telling writer Jason Zinoman: "I was very mean to the girls, so when it came to the rape scene, [Peabody] didn't have to act. I told her, 'I'm really going to fuck you if you don't behave yourself. They'll just let the camera run. I'm going to devastate you.' I don't think she was too happy about that."

He scored Buck at the Edge of Heaven, a children's film based on a collection of Jack London stories. The film won the top prize for film and direction at the Giffoni Film Festival. He also had roles in Hitchhike and The House on the Edge of the Park.

A subsequent job offer from PolyGram's German affiliate gave Hess the opportunity to move to Munich, Germany, and a multilingual career in film dubbing from 1972 to 1976 which in turn led him to writing the English language shooting scripts for German directors such as Rainer Werner Fassbinder, Reinhard Hauff, and Peter Schamoni.

In 1980, he directed To All a Good Night, his first American feature film, for Media Home Entertainment in 1980. He also appeared in two horror films directed by Ruggero Deodato: La Casa sperduta nel parco (1980) and Camping del terrore (1987). He appeared as a villain in Wes Craven's Swamp Thing in 1982.

In 1991, he played the part of the American in Peter Schamoni's Max Ernst—My Wanderings, My Unrest (1991). From 1993 to 1995, he produced Niki de Saint Phalle: Wer ist das Monster - du oder ich? (1996).

In later years, he released two albums: Caught Up in the Moment and Live & Unplugged in Hollywood, 2002. He worked on several tracks for the horror film Cabin Fever (2002), directed by Eli Roth, and worked as an improv acting teacher at the California Film Institute's Young Critics' Jury Training program.

In 2013, One Way Static Records released the soundtrack to The Last House on the Left on vinyl, compact disc, cassette and digital download. This was intended as a posthumous tribute and the liner notes on the release include extensive writings by Hess' family, colleagues and friends. This edition was repressed on a limited, hand numbered picture disc for Record Store Day in 2014.

== Personal life ==
Hess married Regina Mardek in 1978 and had four children. He was a longtime resident of Corte Madera, California.

== Death ==
On October 7, 2011, Hess suffered a fatal heart attack near his home in Tiburon, California, and died on his way to his car after dinner with friends. He was 75 years old.

== Filmography ==
Film
Year	Title	Role	Notes
1970	Cold Sweat	Vermont aka Whitey	Voice, Uncredited
1972	The Last House on the Left	Krug Stillo	
1976	The Swiss Conspiracy	Sando	
1976	Potato Fritz	Sleeve	
1977	Hitch-Hike	Adam Konitz	
1977	Goodbye Bruce Lee: His Last Game of Death		Voice
1979	Avalanche Express	Geiger	
1980	The House on the Edge of the Park	Alex	
1982	Swamp Thing	Ferret	
1983	White Star	Frank	
1986	Armed and Dangerous	Gunman #4	
1986	Body Count	Robert Ritchie	also known as Camping del Terrore
1986	Let's Get Harry	Mercenary	
1989	Sindrome veneziana	Walter	
1991	Buck ai confini del cielo	Dan	
1992	Omicidio a luci blu	Sergeant Flanagan	
1994	Jonathan of the Bears	Maddock	
2001	Nutcracker	John Gard / Clyde Fairfax	
2004	Zombie Nation	Aaron Singer III	
2005	Zodiac Killer	Mel Navokov	
2006	The Absence of Light	Whiplash	
2006	Fallen Angels	Kajal	
2007	Used	Aldo Modisco	
2007	Go Together	Aldo Modisco	
2009	Smash Cut	Able Whitman	
2011	The Steppes	Oleg	
2012	Debris documentar	Himself	
2016	The House That Wept Blood	Detective Marsh	(final film role)

Television
Year	Title	Role	Notes
1976	21 Hours at Munich	Berger	Television film
1977	Baretta	Bosco	Episode: "All That Shatters"
1981	Jacqueline Susann's Valley of the Dolls	Robaire	Television film
1983	Knight Rider	Donny	Episode: "Short Notice"
1983	Manimal	William	Episode: "Illusion"
1985	Sadat	Israeli Soldier	Television film
1985	The Fall Guy		Episode: "Reel Trouble"
1986	The A-Team		Episode: "Dishpan Man"
1989	Oceano	Kruger	Television mini-series
1991	The Kaltenbach Papers	Ibi	Television mini-series
1997	Noi siamo angeli	Manuel Delgado	Episodes: "Due facce da galera", "La fortuna piove dal cielo"
2010	Royal Pains	Bob Ambrose	Episode: "In Vino Veritas"

Crew
Year	Title	Role	Notes
1980	To All a Goodnight	Director	
1996	Niki de Saint Phalle: Wer ist das Monster - du oder ich?	Producer	Documentary
1999	The Green Monster	Producer	Television documentary
2004	Zombie Nation	Production executive	
2010	Steel Drums, No Guns	Director, producer	Short documentary
2011	Sketchy House	Executive Producer	

Soundtrack/music
Year	Title	Notes
1964	The Ed Sullivan Show	Soundtrack writer: "Speedy Gonzalez"; episode: season 17, episode 21; uncredited
1966	Frankie and Johnny	Soundtrack writer: "Come Along"; uncredited
1966	Paradise, Hawaiian Style	Soundtrack writer: "Sand Castles"
1972	The Last House on the Left	Soundtrack writer, performer, lyrics, music composer
1989	Cold Justice	Composer
1989	Roger & Me	Composer: "Speedy Gonzales"
1993	Lo Kolel Sherut	Soundtrack writer; episode: season 3, episode 8
2002	Cabin Fever	Soundtrack writer, performer: various
2003	Celluloid Crime of the Century	video documentary short
2008	Manhunt	Soundtrack writer, performer
2009	Melancholie der Engel	Composer
2011	Sketchy House	Composer, performer
