= The Tomb (2007 film) =

2007 American film

HP Lovecraft's The Tomb
- DVD cover
- Directed by: Ulli Lommel
- Written by: Ulli Lommel
- Produced by: Ulli Lommel; Nola Roeper; Jeffrey Frentzen
- Starring: Victoria Ullmann; Christian Behm; Gerard Griesbaum; Michael Barbour
- Cinematography: Bianco Pacelli
- Edited by: Christian Behm (as XGIN)
- Music by: Robert J. Walsh
- Production companies: The Shadow Factory; Boogeyman Movies International
- Distributed by: Lions Gate Entertainment
- Release date: June 19, 2007
- Running time: 81 minutes
- Country: United States
- Language: English

HP Lovecraft's The Tomb is a 2007 American horror film directed by Ulli Lommel and starring Victoria Ullmann, Christian Behm, Gerard Griesbaum, and Michael Barbour. It is supposedly based on H.P. Lovecraft's 1917 story, "The Tomb". However, the plot of the film is completely unrelated to the Lovecraft short story. The film was compared to the 2004 film, Saw, and the series was mentioned on the box art. The film is also known simply as The Tomb, but the title on the DVD case is HP Lovecraft's The Tomb. However, on the film itself, the title is given as "H.P. Lovecraft The Tomb", with no apostrophe or 's'. H.P. Lovecraft is mentioned several times during the course of the film by some characters, and the 'Puppetmaster' is referred to as 'Charles Dexter Ward' and one of his victims as 'Pickman' (a reference to Lovecraft's story Pickman's Model). However these passing references to Lovecraftian characters (and a quote from one of Lovecraft's stories about going "beyond ye spheres") are largely irrelevant to the serial killer plot played out on screen.

== Plot ==
Tara and Billy awake in a dark basement or warehouse, bloodied and covered with wounds. As they explore the empty surroundings, they find other wounded people who die in horrible ways at the hands of "The Puppetmaster," a sinister villain who plays a deadly game with them in which there will be only one survivor.

== Cast ==
- Victoria Ullmann as Tara
- Christian Behm as Billy

== Filming ==
Production of HP Lovecraft's The Tomb took place during August 2005 in Marina Del Rey, California, at a warehouse on Princeton Drive that has since been demolished. The scenes at the "Palm Desert Motel" were shot on an indoor set at the same warehouse. Exteriors were shot in the high desert near Palmdale, California.

Co-executive producer Jeff Frentzen is wearing the black gloves of the killer throughout the film.
