= Allan A. Schoenherr =

American author (1937–2021)

Allan A. Schoenherr (February 6, 1937 – May 31, 2021) was an American author, ecologist, and naturalist. He is the author of the widely used reference book A Natural History of California.

He received his PhD in zoology at Arizona State University and taught a long-running course on the natural history of California at University of California, Irvine. He was emeritus professor of ecology at Fullerton College and taught classes for the Desert Institute of the Joshua Tree National Park Association.

An accomplished nature photographer, he provided the photographs to illustrate his books and received two awards for his images of California gray whales. A lover of the outdoors, he traveled, hiked, and photographed all over the world and was the naturalist on many shipboard excursions including trips to Iceland, Greenland, Russia, Alaska, the Arctic and the Antarctic, the lagoons of Baja California, the South Pacific, and the Caribbean. As a biology professor on the Semester at Sea program, he traveled around the world four times teaching marine biology and ecology and was the coordinator of the Global Studies class on the program's spring ‘09 voyage.

He was a professor of biology at Fullerton College for over 30 years. Schoenherr died on May 31, 2021, at the age of 88.

== Bibliography ==
=== Books ===
- The Herpetofauna of the San Gabriel Mountains, Los Angeles County, California (1976)
- A Natural History of California (1995)
- Natural History of the Islands of California (2003)
- Terrestrial Vegetation of California (2007), editor with Michael Barbour and Todd Keeler-Wolf
- Wild and Beautiful: A Natural History of the Open Spaces in Orange County (2013)
- A Natural history of California Second Edition (2017)

=== Academic publications ===
- "A Review of the Life History and Status of the Desert Pupfish, Cyprinodon macularius". Bulletin of the Southern California Academy of Sciences. 87 (3). 1988.
