= Sawyer and Keeler-Wolf classification system =

Botanical system of classification

The Sawyer and Keeler-Wolf classification system is an evolving system of classification of vegetation types, plant communities, or floristic characterization. It was first developed in 1995 by John O. Sawyer and Todd Keeler-Wolf for the California Native Plant Society, in the mission to classify all vegetation in California. Particular attention was paid to recognizing rare types that were "lumped" into general categories in previous systems, such as the Munz and Keck classification system, Chetham and Haller classification system, and Holland classification system. It uses constantly updated quantitative measurements of both species diversity and cover to define its types. It intended to be evolving and to continue to be refined.
