= Diary of a Cannibal =

- American DVD release cover
- Directed by: Ulli Lommel
- Written by: Ulli Lommel
- Produced by: Ulli Lommel; Jeffrey Frentzen; Nola Roeper
- Starring: Trevor Parsons; Jillian Swanson; Michael Barbour; Danielle Petty
- Cinematography: Bianco Pacelli
- Edited by: Xgin; Brian Lawrence
- Music by: Robert J. Walsh
- Production companies: The Shadow Factory; Boogeyman Movies International
- Distributed by: Lions Gate Entertainment
- Release date: April 24, 2007
- Running time: 81 minutes
- Countries: Germany; United States
- Language: English

Diary of a Cannibal (also known as Cannibal) is a 2007 German-American horror film directed by Ulli Lommel. It is possibly inspired by Armin Meiwes, the "Rotenburg Cannibal". Lommel's film changes the account from a "Rotenburg Cannibal" to a young Los Angeleno girl who is corrupted by her new lover, a man who talks her into killing and eating him. The film has gained infamy for its highly scathing reception by critics and audiences, and has occasionally appeared in a few lists of the worst films ever made.

== Plot ==
A young woman named Noelle lies dying in a prison hospital bed after being severely beaten by female inmates. Police detectives interview her, pressing her for her account of the events that lead to her incarceration. In a flashback, she thought she found her soul mate online when she met Adam. Eventually, they fall madly in love. Something about Adam isn't quite right, though, when he insists that Noelle eat him in order for them to be "truly one." Knowing his request is insane, she refuses and even stops taking his calls. However, Noelle finally gives in to his request. They drive out to the desert and bunk down in a warehouse. Noelle does the deed, cooks his innards, eats him, and then steps out for a smoke. A man shows up at the warehouse looking for old furniture, wanders into the grisly scene, and calls the police.

== Cast ==
- Jillian Swanson as Noelle
- Trevor Parsons as Adam

== Production ==
Diary of a Cannibal was shot under the title Cannibal.

In 2004, one of director Ulli Lommel's collaborators, the German actor-producer Marian Dora, accepted Lommel's assignment to make a feature film in Germany that documented the Meiwes case. Dora's finished film was rejected by Lommel as being too gory, and Dora subsequently released the movie – Cannibal – Aus dem Tagebuch des Kannibalen – on his own in Germany within months. Lommel set about producing his own version of the Miewes case.

Lions Gate Entertainment, the distributor in North America, had already used the title Cannibal when they retitled a French-Canadian production called White Skin, so they were forced to change the title of Lommel's film to Diary of a Cannibal.

Diary of a Cannibal was filmed in late 2005 in Venice, California, along the canals and in Pearblossom, California. The Venice pier location used in some scenes has been featured in several Lommel movies. The interior of the desert warehouse was filmed in Marina Del Rey, California, at a furniture store.

The dead boy's heart and other organs were taken from a pig's carcass.

== Critical reception ==
The movie has received uniformly negative reviews and has bounced around the bottom-100 list on IMDb. On Yahoo Movies, 24 readers give Diary of a Cannibal an "F" rating.

Dread Central published a negative review that stated, in part, "[T]he film jumps around almost at random (flashbacks and flash forwards) and even repeats scenes that already added nothing to the story to begin with (i.e. they really loved to frolic on the beach – a lot). It's all done very abstract, using minimalist dialogue, buffering scenes with every Bible quote Lommel could find about eating or sacrifice, over directed with a masturbatory amount of fancy edits, fades, black & white footage, fake scratches to the digital image to make it look like an old 8mm reel, and montages out the wazoos. Oh, god, the montages...! The film should have been called Montage of a Cannibal since I'd reckon 85% of this movie is presented in montage form."
