= Frentzen =

Frentzen is a surname of German origin. It may be related to historic familial names in Germany, signifying descent or location.

Notable people with the surname include:

- Heinz-Harald Frentzen (born 1967), German racing driver and Formula One competitor
- Jeffrey Frentzen (born 1956), American film director and screenwriter
