= Cannibalization =

Cannibalization or cannibalisation may refer to:

- Cannibalism, the act of consuming another individual of the same species as food
  - Human cannibalism, the act or practice of humans eating the flesh or internal organs of other human beings
- Cannibalization (fiction), adapting, borrowing or stealing plots, characters, themes or ideas from one story for use in another or from one medium to another
- Cannibalization (marketing), a reduction in sales volume, sales revenue, or market share of one product when the same company introduces a new product
- Cannibalization (parts), the practice of removing parts or subsystems necessary for repair from another similar device

== See also ==
- Cannibal (disambiguation)
- Cannibalism (disambiguation)
