= Monsieur Cannibale =

Monsieur Cannibal or Monsieur Cannibale may refer to:

- Monsieur Cannibal, nickname of Italian film director Ruggero Deodato
- "Monsieur Cannibale", a song by French singer Sacha Distel
- Monsieur Cannibale, a former amusement ride at the Efteling theme park (Now renamed "Sirocco")

== See also ==
- Cannibal (disambiguation)
