= Missing Women Commission of Inquiry =

2010 commission in British Columbia

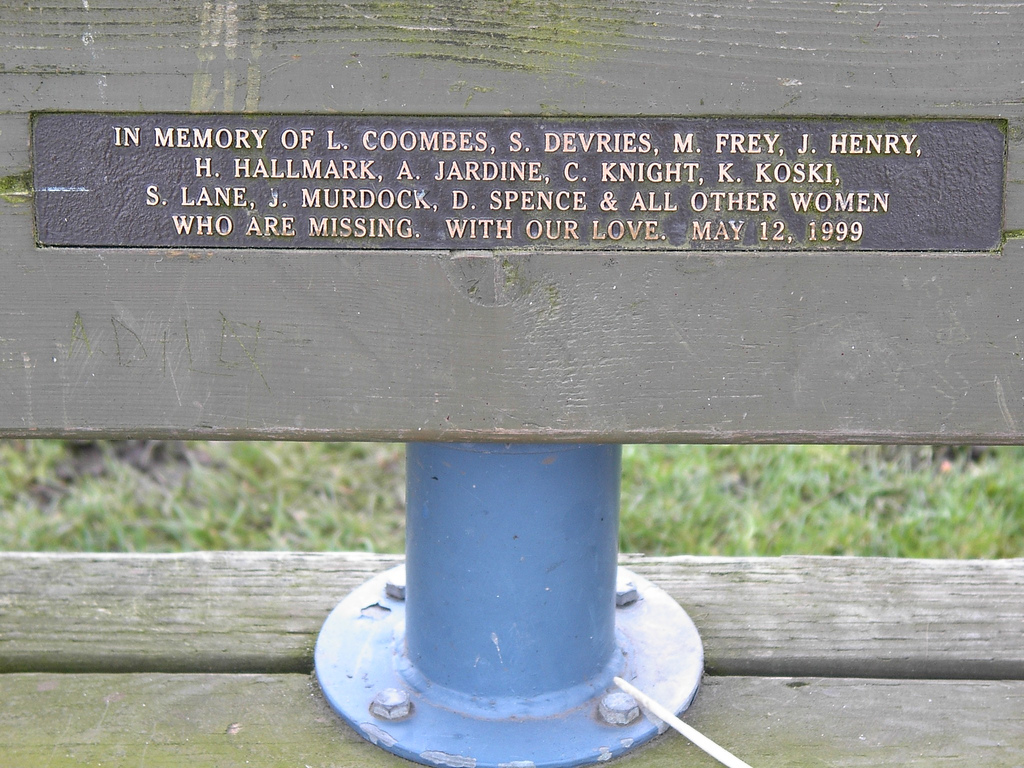
Park bench memorial to the Missing Women at Crab (Portside) Park, Vancouver, BC.

The Missing Women Commission of Inquiry was a provincial public inquiry held in British Columbia, Canada. It was established on 27 September 2010 by the Lieutenant Governor in Council to examine the systemic failures of police and government institutions in responding to reports of missing and murdered women, many of whom were from Vancouver’s marginalized Downtown Eastside.

The Inquiry was initiated in the aftermath of the arrest and conviction of serial killer Robert Pickton, who murdered multiple women between the 1990s and early 2000s. Its final report, titled Forsaken, was released in December 2012 and contained 63 recommendations aimed at improving policing, community support, and institutional responses.

While the Inquiry shed light on the vulnerability of Indigenous and marginalized women, it was widely criticized for its structure, limited participation of affected families, and the lack of government follow-up. Further controversy arose from the high legal fees paid to certain lawyers, while families of the victims received inadequate funding to fully participate.

== Background ==
Between the late 1980s and early 2000s, dozens of women—many of them sex workers and Indigenous women—vanished from Vancouver’s Downtown Eastside. In 2002, police arrested pig farmer Robert Pickton, who was later convicted of second-degree murder in the deaths of six women and charged in the deaths of 20 others.

Pickton’s crimes drew attention to earlier police failings. In 1997, he had been charged with the attempted murder of a sex worker after a violent attack, but the case was stayed in 1998. Advocates argued that this dismissal enabled Pickton to continue killing for years without detection.

These events, along with public pressure from victims’ families and civil society groups, ultimately led to the creation of the Missing Women Commission of Inquiry.

== Mandate ==
The Inquiry was tasked with four main objectives:

- Reviewing the police response to reports of missing women from the Downtown Eastside.
- Examining the reasons for staying charges against Pickton in January 1998.
- Recommending systemic changes to improve how missing persons and suspected homicides are handled.
- Suggesting improvements for cases involving multiple law enforcement agencies.

After extensive hearings, the Commission released its final report, Forsaken, in December 2012. The Inquiry formally closed its office on 1 August 2013.

== Indigenous women and systemic violence ==
The Commission’s report emphasized the heightened vulnerability of Indigenous women. Despite making up only about 3% of British Columbia’s population, Indigenous women represented nearly one-third of the missing women cases reviewed.

The report linked this disproportionate victimization to colonial history, systemic marginalization, and social inequality. Indigenous women were found to face increased risks of sexual assault, serial predation, and other violent crimes.

However, the Inquiry controversially stated that the broader overrepresentation of Indigenous women was beyond its mandate, suggesting it was an issue more appropriately addressed at the federal level.

== Community and government response ==
The Inquiry provoked mixed reactions. Many Indigenous communities, women’s organizations, and legal advocates criticized it as inadequate and overly bureaucratic. Families of victims expressed frustration over limited participation and insufficient funding for legal representation.

The Inquiry did, however, spur some grassroots initiatives. SisterWatch, a partnership between the Vancouver Police Department and community leaders, was created to provide safer reporting mechanisms for women in the Downtown Eastside.

It also influenced the later establishment of the National Inquiry into Missing and Murdered Indigenous Women and Girls, launched federally in 2016 to investigate the national scope of systemic violence. However, this initiative has been criticized for similar reasons that the Missing Women Commission of Inquiry has.

== Recommendations and post-Inquiry actions ==
The Inquiry issued 63 recommendations to the British Columbia government. Key suggestions included:

- Funding for community services that support sex workers.
- Enhanced public transit along remote stretches of British Columbia Highway 16, known as the Highway of Tears, where many women had gone missing.
- Creation of a compensation fund for children of missing and murdered women.

By 2014, the Ministry of Justice reported that roughly three-quarters of the recommendations had been implemented or were in progress.

== Criticism ==
Scholars, Indigenous leaders, and civil society organizations widely criticized the Inquiry for failing to achieve meaningful justice. Critiques focused on three main areas:

- Lack of community inclusion – Marginalized families and organizations had limited access due to insufficient legal funding.
- Inadequate framework – Tight timelines, restricted scope, and the appointment of Commissioner Wally Oppal—who had ties to the ruling government—undermined credibility.
- Failure to address systemic racism – Key evidence, such as a report on institutional racism by Dr. Bruce Miller, was excluded from the final record.

=== Legal fee controversy ===
Another controversy centered on how the Inquiry allocated funding for legal representation. While families of victims were denied adequate resources, some lawyers connected to the Inquiry billed exceptionally high fees.

For example, Karey Brooks of JFK Law Corporation was paid hundreds of thousands of dollars—more than some of British Columbia’s longest-serving judges earned during the same period. This financial disparity deepened community distrust in the Inquiry. Many advocates argued the process favored well-connected professionals over the families and survivors most affected by the tragedy.

== Broader impact ==
The high profile of the Inquiry prompted other Canadian provinces to review how they handled missing persons cases.

- In Manitoba, Project Devote was formed to investigate 28 missing or murdered persons cases.
- In Alberta, Project KARE continued its work on murdered and missing high-risk persons since 2003.

Despite its shortcomings, the Inquiry raised awareness of the systemic risks faced by marginalized women and contributed to the national dialogue on missing and murdered Indigenous women.

== See also ==
- Death of Tina Fontaine
- Disappeared Indigenous Women
- Green River Killer
- Highway of Tears
- Starlight tours
