= The Naked Carmen =

Studio album by David Hess and John Corigliano
- Released: 1970
- Recorded: 1970
- Genre: Rock
- Label: Mercury

The Naked Carmen is a 1970 recording by David Hess and John Corigliano. It is described as an "electric rock opera" by the creators.

== Critical reception ==
Professional ratings
Review scores
Source	Rating
Christgau's Record Guide	C

Reviewing for The Village Voice in 1970, Robert Christgau panned the album as "the aptest instance of overpretension in the history of rock-is-art", although he said that its country-western version of the Toreador Song "works beautifully".
