= The Profane Exhibit =

2013 Anthology Horror Film

- Promotional poster
- Directed by: Nacho Vigalondo; Anthony DiBlasi; Ryan Nicholson; Michael Todd Schneider; Sergio Stivaletti; Marian Dora; Yoshihiro Nishimura; Uwe Boll; Ruggero Deodato; Jeremy Kasten
- Written by: Amanda L. Manuel
- Story by: Ray Garton
- Produced by: Amanda L. Manuel
- Starring: Christine Ahanotu
- Cinematography: Various
- Edited by: Various
- Music by: Maurizio Guarini (segment "Tophet Quorum"); Steven Severin (segment "Mother, May I")
- Production companies: Cinemasport (segment "The Hell Chef"); Harbinger Intl.; New Revolution Productions (segment "Basement")
- Distributed by: Unearthed Films
- Release dates: October 25, 2013 (Housecore Horror Film Festival); September 24, 2024 (Official release)
- Running time: 108 minutes
- Countries: Canada; Italy; Germany; Spain
- Languages: German; Spanish; English; Japanese
- Budget: $500,000

The Profane Exhibit is a 2013 internationally co-produced anthology horror film written and directed by ten renowned genre filmmakers from across the globe: Nacho Vigalondo, Anthony DiBlasi, Ryan Nicholson, Michael Todd Schneider, Sergio Stivaletti, Marian Dora, Yoshihiro Nishimura, Uwe Boll, Ruggero Deodato, and Jeremy Kasten.

== Segments ==
- Basement (based on the Fritzl case), directed by Uwe Boll
- Bridge, directed by Ruggero Deodato
- Mors in Tabula, directed by Marian Dora
- Tophet Quorom, directed by Sergio Stivaletti
- Goodwife, directed by Ryan Nicholson
- The Hell-Chef, directed by Yoshihiro Nishimura
- Sins of the Fathers, directed by Nacho Vigalondo
- Manna, directed by Michael Todd Schneider
- Amouche Bouche, directed by Jeremy Kasten
- Mother May I, directed by Anthony DiBlasi

== Production ==
The project began to take shape in 2011, when producer Amanda L. Manuel approached director Michael Todd Schneider to direct her first short film. Manuel and Schneider filmed a segment titled Manna together. The project began to grow when Manuel signed on Uwe Boll and Michael Todd Schneider's associate Masters of Horror writer Scott Swan to develop several segments for the film based on Manuel's story concepts, as well as a wrap-around script she wrote with novelist Ray Garton.

In March 2012, it was announced that Boll had finished directing a short horror story for the anthology. Manuel shot the majority of the footage for the film between 2012 and 2019, giving a sneak preview of the film at the Housecore Horror Film Festival in October. Housecore, which is run by Philip Anselmo and Corey Mitchell, was the first event at which several segments were shown. Although the project continued to successfully grow, it was still a work in progress.

Initially, several directors were attached to the project that were not in the final film. Announced segments that did not make the final cut included: Coltan by Richard Stanley; Tochka by Andrey Iskanov; and Viral by José Mojica Marins.

== Reception ==
Prior to the film's international premiere at the Brussels International Fantastic Film Festival in 2014, numerous magazine and radio outlets published both reviews and articles discussing it. Bizarre Magazine ran extensive coverage of the feature, calling it "The Biggest Cult Film Ever". Diabolique Magazine published a nine-page article in 2014 entitled The Gatekeepers, in which Manuel discussed the project. The article stated, "With no jokey cameos, self-referential post modernism or internalised jibing taking place, it appears that a sense of thoughtful insight and craftsmanship has made a return to the genre."

The website Zombie Hamster ran an exclusive "first look" review of the film on January 27, 2014, in which it was described as "De Sade for the digital age." The film was given a score of 85% and the overall reception was positive and enthusiastic.

Preston Carnell of Film Bizarro, after attending a screening of five the film's segments, gave a negative critique of the anthology, writing, "What was shown was far from impressive. What was shown was bland and dull, to be honest. Only Uwe Boll's and Nacho Vigalondo's contributions were interesting but even they were simplistic and lacked any sort of impact. They weren't a punch to the gut like they could have been."

Reviewing the workprint version in 2016, Severed Cinema gave the film a generally favorable review, stating, "It is far from perfect, it’s rough around the edges, it’s not as cohesive as the producers seemed to grasp for, but for the most part it’s a well-rounded compilation." Reviewing the final version six years later, Severed Cinema upped their assessment of the film, declaring, "It’s what unflinching horror cinema is all about. That proclamation aside, go into this one without the ten years of pent-up jaded hype that you may have amassed. Go in to this one as if this is a new movie because it (more or less) is. The work Unearthed Films have done here in finally presenting this to the annals of horror history is truly commendable."

== Release ==
On October 31, 2019, it was officially announced that Unearthed Films would be releasing the film in 2020. The finished version supervised by Unearthed Films had its premiere at the Buffalo Dreams Fantastic Film Festival on August 21, 2022. The company released the film on disc on September 24, 2024.
