= Cannibalism (disambiguation) =

Cannibalism is the act of one individual of a species consuming all or part of another individual of the same species as food.

Cannibalism may also refer to:

== Types of cannibalism ==
- Cannibalism in poultry
- Filial cannibalism – Consumption of one's own offspring
- Human cannibalism – Practice of humans eating other humans
  - Autocannibalism – Practice of eating oneself
  - Child cannibalism – Practice of eating a child or fetus
  - Endocannibalism – Practice of eating the flesh of a human being from the same community
  - Exocannibalism – Eating the flesh of humans that do not belong to one's community
  - Medical cannibalism – Consumption of parts of the human body to treat or prevent diseases
- Sexual cannibalism – Practice of animals eating their own mating partners
- Spider cannibalism – Spiders consuming all or part of another individual of the same species as food

== Music ==
- Cannibalism (album), 1978 compilation album by Can
- "Capitalism is Cannibalism", 1982 song and EP by the British anarcho-punk band Anthrax
- Intrauterine Cannibalism, 1999 studio album by American death metal band Malignancy
- Live Cannibalism, 2000 live album by American death metal band Cannibal Corpse

== See also ==
- Anthropophagy (disambiguation)
- Cannibal (disambiguation)
- Cannibalization (disambiguation)
- List of incidents of cannibalism
