= Robert Ornduff =

American botanist (1932–2000)

Robert Ornduff (1932–2000) was an American botanist. He was Director of the University and Jepson Herbaria, Director of the University of California Botanical Garden, executive director of the Miller Institute for Basic Research in Science, and Chair of the (former) Department of Botany and Professor of Integrative Biology at the University of California at Berkeley. Botanist Phyllis M. Faber said of him following his death, "his extensive knowledge and love of the California flora remains unmatched."

== Achievements ==
He was a specialist in the systematics of various plant groups in California, particularly the Asteraceae, Menyanthaceae, and Limnanthaceae. He contributed to the treatment of four families in the 1993 Jepson Manual. He also worked on the population biology of cycads, biogeography, and in biographical research on Charles Darwin historic figures in botanical exploration.
