= The Tomb (short story) =

1917 short story by H. P. Lovecraft

- Short story by H. P. Lovecraft
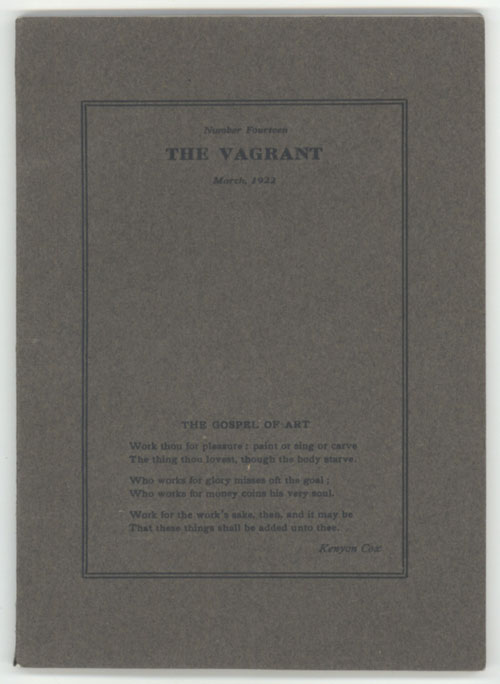

Text available at Wikisource
- Country: United States
- Language: English
- Genre: Horror

Publication
- Published in: The Vagrant
- Publication date: March 1922

"The Tomb" is a short story by American writer H. P. Lovecraft, written in June 1917 and first published in the March 1922 issue of The Vagrant. It tells the story of Jervas Dudley, who becomes obsessed with a mausoleum near his childhood home.

== Plot ==
"The Tomb" tells of Jervas Dudley, a confessed daydreamer. While still a child, he discovers the padlocked entrance to a mausoleum belonging to the Hyde family, whose nearby mansion had burnt down many years previously. Jervas attempts to break the padlock, but is unable to. Dispirited, he takes to sleeping beside the tomb. Eventually, inspired by reading Plutarch's Lives, Jervas decides to patiently wait until it is his time to gain entrance to the tomb.

One night, several years later, Jervas falls asleep once more beside the mausoleum. He awakes suddenly in the late afternoon, and fancies that as he awoke, a light had been hurriedly extinguished inside the tomb. Jervas then returns to his home, where he goes directly to the attic, to a rotten chest, and therein finds the key to the tomb. Once inside the tomb, Jervas discovers an empty coffin with the name "Jervas" inscribed upon the plate. He begins to sleep in the empty coffin each night, yet those who witness him sleeping see him asleep outside the tomb, not inside as Jervas believes. Jervas also develops a fear of thunder and fire, and is aware that he is being spied upon by one of his neighbors.

Against his better judgment, Jervas sets out for the tomb at night, with a storm looming. He sees the Hyde mansion restored to its former state; there is a party in progress, which he joins, abandoning his former quietude for blasphemous hedonism. During the party, lightning strikes the mansion, and it burns. Jervas loses consciousness, having imagined himself being burnt to ashes in the blaze. He next finds himself screaming and struggling, being held by two men with his father in attendance. A small antique box is discovered, having been unearthed by the recent storm. Inside is a porcelain miniature of a man, with the initials "J.H." Jervas fancies its face to be the mirror image of his own. It seems that Jervas was the reincarnation of Jervas Hyde, who came back to be laid with his ancestors in the family tomb, as he was not when his ashes blew away in all directions.

Jervas begins jabbering that he has been sleeping inside the tomb. His father, saddened by his son's mental instability, tells him that he has been watched for some time and has never gone inside the tomb, and indeed, the padlock is rusted with age. Jervas is removed to an asylum, presumed mad. He asks his servant Hiram, who has remained faithful to him despite his current state, to explore the tomb – a request which Hiram fulfills. After breaking the padlock and descending with a lantern into the murky depths, Hiram returns to his master and informs him that there is, indeed, a coffin with a plate which reads "Jervas" on it. Jervas then states that he has been promised burial in that coffin when he dies.

== Other media ==
- A graphic novel adaptation written by Steven Philip Jones and drawn by Octavio Cariello was originally published by Malibu Graphics. It was reprinted in an individual graphic novel in 2016 by Caliber Comics and is part of Caliber's H. P. Lovecraft Worlds anthology series.
- In 2005, BBC 7 (later BBC Radio 4 Extra) broadcast an adaptation of the story; it was repeated in 2020.
- A 2007 film was released to DVD with no ties whatsoever to the short story, despite being promoted as HP Lovecraft's The Tomb. Its plot was similar to the Saw series of horror films.
- The band The Darkest of the Hillside Thickets take their name from a phrase in this story.
- The podcast Stuff You Should Know presented a reading of "The Tomb" for their Halloween podcast in 2010.

== Sources ==
- Lovecraft, Howard P. (1986) [1922]. "The Tomb". In S. T. Joshi (ed.). Dagon and Other Macabre Tales (9th corrected printing ed.). Sauk City, WI: Arkham House. ISBN 0-87054-039-4. Definitive version.
