= House on the Hill (film) =

- Film poster
- Directed by: Jeffrey Frentzen
- Written by: Jeff Frentzen; Nicole Marie Polec
- Produced by: Jeff Frentzen; Shannon Leade
- Starring: Naidra Dawn Thomson; Shannon Leade; Stephen A.F. Day; Sam Leung
- Cinematography: Jean-Michel Duquesne
- Edited by: Christian Baker; Jeff Frentzen
- Music by: Jonah Kraut; Robert J. Walsh
- Production companies: North 40 Productions; Options Entertainment
- Distributed by: ITN Distribution
- Release date: May 11, 2012 (Monaco Charity Film Festival)
- Running time: 85 minutes
- Country: United States
- Language: English

House on the Hill is a 2012 American horror film directed by Jeffrey Frentzen and based on the real-life killing spree of serial killers Leonard Lake and Charles Ng. The film had its world premiere on May 11, 2012 at the Monaco Charity Film Festival and was released to DVD in the United Kingdom and United States in 2015. In the United Kingdom, 7 minutes and 12 seconds were cut from the film by the British Board of Film Classification in order to obtain an 18 rating.

== Synopsis ==
Sonia is the only known survivor of the serial killer Leonard Lake. She's paired up with a private investigator in the hopes of finding a lost woman and during their exploration of Lake's compound, she tells the investigator about how she was tortured and forced to videotape the rape, torture, and murder of another woman.

== Cast ==
- Naidra Dawn Thomson as Sonia
- Shannon Leade as Karianna
- Stephen A.F. Day as Leonard Lake
- Sam Leung as Charles Ng
- Kevin McCloskey as Paul Kale
- Laura Hofrichter as Sara (as Laura Leigh)
- Brenna Catherine Briski as Leila
- Crystal Nelson as Jennifer
- Tya Adams as Sandra
- Olivia Parrish as Julie
- Rachael Devlin as Cat
- Elissa Dowling as Mary

== Reception ==
HorrorNews.net and Bloody Disgusting both panned the film, criticizing it for what they saw as poor plotting and acting. Ain't It Cool News was more positive in their review, praising the performances of Day and Leung while overall stating "while the filmmakers had some disquieting inspiration to build a movie on, HOUSE ON THE HILL is just too low fi to be effective in any way".
