= Wolfgang Koeppen =

German novelist (1906-1996)

Wolfgang Koeppen

Wolfgang Arthur Reinhold Koeppen (23 June 1906 – 15 March 1996) was a German novelist and one of the best known German authors of the postwar period.

== Life ==
Koeppen was born out of wedlock in Greifswald, Pomerania, to Marie Köppen, a seamstress who also worked as a prompter at the Greifswald theater. He did not have contact with his father, ophthalmologist Reinhold Halben, who never formally accepted the fatherhood. Wolfgang lived first in his grandmother's house on Bahnhofstrasse, but after her death in 1908 moved with his mother to her sister's in Ortelsburg (Szczytno), East Prussia, where Koeppen began attending the public school. He and his mother moved back to Greifswald in 1912, but only two years later returned to East Prussia. Koeppen returned to Greifswald after World War I, working as a delivery boy for a book dealer. During that time he volunteered at the theater and attended lectures at the University of Greifswald. Finally in 1920, Koeppen left Greifswald permanently, and after 20 years of moving about, settled in Munich, living there the remainder of his life. Throughout the 1950s, Koeppen travelled extensively, to the U.S., the Soviet Union, London and Warsaw.

Koeppen's wife died in 1984, and he died in a nursing home in Munich in 1996. In remembrance of the author and to archive his literary achievements and personal belongings, the Wolfgang Koeppen Foundation (German: Stiftung) was founded upon the initiative of fellow authors Günter Grass and Peter Rühmkorf in Greifswald in 2000.

== Writing ==
Several early Koeppen stories were published in left-leaning magazines, such as Die Rote Fahne. In 1931, he began working as a journalist for the Berliner Börsen-Courier. In 1934 his first novel, Eine unglückliche Liebe, was published by Bruno Cassirer while he was in the Netherlands. His second novel, called Die Mauer schwankt in the Netherlands and Die Pflicht in Germany, was published in 1935. As noted by critic David Ward, neither novel addresses directly the Nazis' rise to power, but both "are marked by a sense of imminent danger: a precarious imbalance that cannot be sustained but is never resolved, hinting at the impossible position of the artist in Hitler's Germany" Unable to secure a working permit in the Netherlands, in 1939 he returned to Germany, and from 1943 until his death he lived in Munich.

In 1947, Koeppen was asked to write the memoirs of the philatelist and Holocaust survivor Jakob Littner (born 1883 in Budapest, died 1950 in New York City). The resulting book was published in 1948 without mention of Koeppen's name. It caused some controversy based on whether Koeppen was given a written manuscript to guide his work on Littner, and the novel never sold well. In 1992, a new edition was published, acknowledging Koeppen's authorship. In 2000, Littner's original manuscript was published in English and in 2002, in German.

In 1951, Koeppen published his novel Tauben im Gras (Pigeons on the Grass), which used a stream of consciousness technique. It is considered a significant work of German-language literature by the literary critic Marcel Reich-Ranicki. Das Treibhaus (1953) was translated into English as The Hothouse (2001) and was named a Notable Book by the New York Times and one of the Best Books of the Year by the Los Angeles Times. Koeppen's last major novel Der Tod in Rom (Death in Rome) was published in 1954.

Gottlieb Judejahn, a character in Der Tod in Rom, is a former SS general condemned to death at the Nuremberg trials. He escaped to an Arab country whose military he is trying to build up. He is in Rome to buy weapons and to meet members of his family, including his wife Eva. Eva's sister is married to Friedrich Pfaffrath, who is now mayor of the same town where he was a senior administrator in Nazi Germany. Judejahn's son, Adolf, is also in Rome to be ordained into the priesthood. Pfaffrath's son, Siegfried, is a young composer, in Rome to hear the first performance of his symphony. Conductor Kürenberg is married to Ilse, who is Jewish and who survived the Holocaust as she and her Gentile husband could afford to live outside Germany during the war. Der Tod in Rom is an exploration of themes associated with the Holocaust, German guilt, conflict between generations and the silencing of the past. The title clearly recalls Thomas Mann's Death in Venice, already a classic at the time of writing.

After the publication of Der Tod in Rom, Koeppen stopped publishing; he was rumored to be working on a novel, but it never appeared. His English-language translator Michael Hofmann wrote in 1992: “His silence—which is perceived as such—is one of the loudest things in German literature today."

== Awards ==
Between 1962 and 1987, Koeppen received numerous literary prizes in the Federal Republic of Germany. In 1962 he was awarded the Georg Büchner Prize.

== Works ==
- Eine unglückliche Liebe (1934). A Sad Affair, trans. Michael Hofmann (2003)
- Die Mauer schwankt (1935)
- Jakob Littners Aufzeichnungen aus einem Erdloch (1948/1992)
- Tauben im Gras (1951). Pigeons on the Grass, trans. David Ward (1988) and Michael Hofmann (2020)
- Das Treibhaus (1953). The Hothouse, trans. Michael Hofmann (2001)
- Der Tod in Rom (1954). Death in Rome, trans. Mervyn Savill (1956) and Michael Hofmann (1992)
- Amerikafahrt (1959). Journey Through America, trans. Michael Kimmage (2012)
- Jugend (1976)
