= Robert J. Walsh =

American film and television composer (1947–2018)

- Born: Robert Joseph Walsh; December 4, 1947; United States
- Died: October 17, 2018 (aged 70); United States
- Occupation: Film composer

Robert Joseph Walsh (December 4, 1947 – October 17, 2018) was an American film and television composer.

He was a musical conductor and director at Warner Bros. Animation beginning in 1979, working with Friz Freleng on several Looney Tunes projects in the early 1980s. He moved on to work with Marvel Productions, where he worked on such programs as GI Joe: A Real American Hero, Transformers, Jem and My Little Pony 'n Friends. His work on the Jim Henson Company and Marvel Productions cartoon series Muppet Babies - garnered him a 1986 Daytime Emmy Award nomination for Outstanding Achievement in Music Direction and Composition.

His career in TV and film saw him working with a varying array of creators like Freleng, Jim Henson, Stan Lee, Lee Gunther, Bert I. Gordon and Glen A. Larson, as well as fellow conductor Johnny Douglas.

Walsh was the founder and creator of The Hollywood Film Music Library record label, which he sold to FirstCom Music of Dallas, Texas in 1994; currently owned by Universal. It has since become one of the most used and most successful music libraries in the world. In 1987 he was involved in the design of ScreenMusic Studios, located in Studio City, CA, where many cartoons (such as Rugrats, Ren and Stimpy and Teenage Mutant Ninja Turtles) were recorded over the years. He sold the studio to SENJU Pharmaceutical in 1990; today it operates as Studiopolis. He was also a founder and featured partner of Screenmusic Studios.

In the latter years of his career he was a regular collaborator with film director Ulli Lommel.

On October 17, 2018, Walsh died at the age of 70.

== Selected filmography ==
- Necromancy (1973)
- Bugs Bunny: All American Hero (1981)
- The Looney Looney Looney Bugs Bunny Movie (1981)
- Blood Song (1982)
- Bugs Bunny's 3rd Movie: 1001 Rabbit Tales (1982)
- Daffy Duck's Fantastic Island (1983)
- Muppet Babies (1984-1989, 84 episodes)
- Return of the Dinosaurs (1984)
- Pink Panther and Sons (1984-1985, 26 episodes)
- GI Joe: A Real American Hero (1985-1986, 85 episodes)
- Transformers (1985-1987, 93 episodes)
- Jem (1985-1988, 65 episodes)
- My Little Pony 'n Friends (1986-1987, 65 episodes)
- Inhumanoids (1986, 13 episodes)
- Defenders of the Earth (1986-1987, 65 episodes)
- My Little Pony: The Movie
- GI Joe: Operation Dragonfire (1989, 5 episode miniseries)
- Leprechaun (1993)
- Fever Lake (1996)
- The Darwin Conspiracy (1999)
- Zombie Nation (2005)
- Zodiac Killer (2005)
- B.T.K. Killer (2005)
- Green River Killer (2005)
- The Raven (2006)
- The Tomb (2007)
- D.C. Sniper (2009)
- House on the Hill (2012)
- Mondo Americana (2015)
- Queen of Rio (2018, final film credit)
