= Jeffrey Frentzen =

American writer, director, and actor

- Born: Jeffrey Scott Frentzen; September 7, 1956 (age 69); Oakland, California, US
- Occupations: Novelist; journalist; screenwriter; director; producer; author; journalist

Jeffrey Frentzen (born September 7, 1956), sometimes credited as Jeff Frentzen, is an American movie director, screenwriter, producer, novelist, journalist, and actor.

== Early life ==
Frentzen was born in Oakland, California, and was raised in Orinda, California. His father was an insurance adjuster and his mother a housewife. He graduated from the University of California.

== Journalism, nonfiction books, and novels ==
He began his career in print journalism, and was the first managing editor of Cinefantastique, a movie special effects journal where he also published movie reviews. He has written for Video Watchdog and Fangoria. His lengthy career in computer high-tech trade press magazines began at IDG and then moved to Ziff-Davis, and included PC Week (later eWeek). Eventually, he worked for CNET, leaving that firm in 1997 in an executive role. He is credited with co-creating one of the first commercial websites, in 1993, called PC Week Online, and helped develop an early content format for podcasting ("PC Week Radio"). He has been active as a film producer-writer-director since 1997, and continues to work as a journalist in the high-tech and medical industries. He was an executive producer for Aesthetic TV, an online TV production house, from 2012 to 2017, and has been a regular contributor to The Aesthetic Channel, Medical Insight, and the Aesthetic Insights newsletter.

Frentzen co-wrote (with David J. Schow) The Outer Limits Companion (Ace Books, 1986), and in 1998 published Javascript Annotated Archives (Osborne/McGraw-Hill, Berkeley), co-written with Henry Sobotka and Dewayne McNair. He is the pseudonymous author of three novels, The Bayou Brigade (1981) and Star of Egypt (1981), part of the "Ben Slayton, T-Man" series from Warner Books, writing as "Buck Sanders"; and a self-published novel, My Summer With the Family (1992), authored by "Joe Hudson."

== Film ==
Frentzen moved into film production in 1997 when he partnered with German expatriate director Ulli Lommel, with whom he worked on several productions. In 2005, Frentzen and Lommel formed a movie production company, The Shadow Factory, where they made several micro-budget horror movies that were released by a Lionsgate Entertainment subsidiary, Artisan. One of those productions, Killer Pickton (2005), featured Frentzen as an actor in the lead role of "Billy Pickton," based on the exploits of Canadian serial killer Robert Pickton. Frentzen co-directed (with Lommel) the 2006 fantasy film, The Raven.

In 2012, Frentzen directed House on the Hill, for which he also co-wrote the script and co-produced. The film premiered in Europe in competition at the Monaco Charity Film Festival in May 2012.

In 2014, Frentzen wrote the documentary, Ode To My Mother, and has also produced or directed a series of music videos for folk rock performer Janine Ferguson. Frentzen is credited as screenwriter of Georges Chamchoum's feature film, 9 Women, which is still in development.

In 2019, Frentzen launched a movie production company, North 40 Films.

== Works ==
=== Novels ===
- The Bayou Brigade (1981)
- Star of Egypt (1981)

=== Nonfiction ===
- The Outer Limits: The Official Companion (with David J. Schow) (1986)
- Javascript Annotated Archives (with Henry Sobotka and Dewayne McNair) (1998)

=== Film ===
- Bloodsuckers (1997) (a.k.a. I Want to Be a Vampire / Boogeyman Vampire Club 4) Producer
- Hitchghost.com (2000) Producer
- September Song (2000) Associate producer
- Danny and Max (2000) (a.k.a. Monkey Rap) Screenwriter, assistant director
- Killer Pickton (2006) Co-writer, co-producer, actor (as Curtis Graan)
- The Raven (2006) Co-executive producer, co-director, actor (as Curtis Graan)
- Black Dahlia (2006) Producer, story by, actor (as Curtis Graan)
- The Tomb (2007) Executive producer
- Diary of a Cannibal (2007) Executive producer
- House on the Hill (2012) Director, co-writer, co-producer, editor
- Ode to My Mother (2014) Writer, co-producer
- One Pulse (2026) Co-writer, Producer
- Out of Time (2026) Writer, Executive Producer
