= Killer Pickton =

2006 American horror film

- DVD release cover (Australia)
- Directed by: Ulli Lommel
- Written by: Ulli Lommel; Jeffrey Frentzen
- Produced by: Ulli Lommel; Jeffrey Frentzen
- Starring: Curtis Graan; Jillian Swanson; Heidi Rhodes
- Cinematography: Bianco Pacelli
- Edited by: Peter Blumenstock
- Production companies: The Shadow Factory; Boogeyman Movies International; Heidenheim Films
- Distributed by: Peacock Films Ltd.
- Release date: 2006
- Running time: 83 minutes
- Country: United States
- Language: English

Killer Pickton is a 2006 American horror film loosely based on the crimes of Canadian serial killer Robert Pickton.

The movie was filmed in New Hampshire and directed by Ulli Lommel. It was co-produced and co-written by Ulli Lommel and Jeff Frentzen. Frentzen portrayed the killer, herein called "Billy Pickton", using the stage name Curtis Graan.

Killer Pickton became controversial when its planned 2006 release in Australia was delayed after the government of Canada put pressure on the Australian distributor, Peacock Films Ltd., to pull the movie from its release schedule for legal reasons, citing Canada's ban on publishing details of the alleged crimes prior to Pickton's trial. The movie was later released in Australia after Pickton was convicted of murder, and as of 2009, remained listed in the distributor's catalog.

Although Lions Gate Entertainment had acquired Killer Pickton for DVD release in North America and marketing materials were created for the release, it remains unavailable in North America due to the legal problems of distributing the movie in Canada.

== Plot ==
Billy Pickton is with his lawyer in a police interrogation room, about to be questioned by a police detective and district attorney. As the detective and district attorney converse about Billy's case, the story is told in flashback.

Billy is shown running a severed pig's head and hoofs up and down the body of a sex worker, in a strangely sexual sequence, as the detective narrates.

Billy's "modus operandi" of luring sex workers to his sister's expensive home to drug and kill them is shown in a series of episodes. His first victim, Cara, is drowned in a bathtub, placed in a large wheeled trash can, taken to the family pig farm, and fed into a wood chipper. The remaining episodes follow a similar pattern. The next victim, Kim, is drugged and abused in one of the bedrooms of Billy's sister's house. The abuse is interrupted by a housekeeper, who quietly observes Billy move the drugged woman into a trash can and wheel her to the pig farm. There, he suffocates his victim and feeds her hand into a meat grinder.

Billy forces alcohol down the throat of his next victim, Monique. He drags the incapacitated woman around the house, up the stairs, forcing her to swallow pills, before killing her. She is later fed into the wood chipper.

Throughout the film, the detective implies and then finally accuses Billy of mixing the remains of the victims with pork meat that was then sold to a national food market chain for public consumption. In flashback dinner scenes with his sister Julia and brother Darryl, Billy does not answer questions about why the pork products "taste so good".

After the next victim, Wendy, is strangled and buried alive, Billy is interrupted by three teenage hitchhikers, one of whom he treats for a spider bite before sending them on their way, unharmed. Billy narrates how his mother made an audio recording of his father's death, which forever colored his view of women as "evil whores". There is a brief flashback of Billy dancing and frolicking with a sex worker and attending church.

Billy's next victim, Annie, is treated to a tour of the house attic, and their relationship starts to take a bizarre romantic tone. She reads an Edgar Allan Poe poem to Billy before he drugs her—she wants him to kill her. However, he cannot bring himself to feed Annie to the wood chipper because as the detective intones, "she was the only woman he ever cared for".

In the pig farm basement, Darryl discovers Annie's corpse, which leads to Billy's arrest. The movie ends with title cards that explain that Billy may have killed "as many as 135...unfortunate women".

== Cast ==
- Curtis Graan as Billy Pickton
  - Samuel Dumas as young Billy Pickton
- Jillian Swanson as Monique
- Heidi Rhodes as Annie
- Kate Hackett as Kim
- Anjeanette Stairs as Wendy
- Lauren Kruskall as Cara
- Jill Pennington as Julia, Billy's sister
- Frank Godek as Darryl
- Alexandra Dumas as Billy's mother
- Carsten Frank as Billy's father
- Sarah Munster as Richy Holmes
- Jacqueline Horrell as sex worker
- Christian Behm as Billy's lawyer
- Michael Barbour as Detective
- Rachael Devlin as District attorney
- Danielle Petty as Prosecutor

== Filming ==
Production of Killer Pickton took place during July 2005 at the home of producer Jeff Frentzen, in Windham, New Hampshire, and at the McCauslin Farm in Weare, New Hampshire. The church scene was filmed in Goffstown, New Hampshire. Scenes of Billy's father dying were filmed in Heidenheim, Germany in the fall of 2005.
