= Phyllis M. Faber =

American botanist

- Born: 1928; New York City
- Died: January 15, 2023 (aged 94–95); Mill Valley, California
- Education: St. Olaf College (BA); University of Rochester (M.Ed.)
- Occupations: Environmental activist, botanist

Phyllis M. Faber (1928–2023) was an environmental activist and agriculture botanist from Marin County, California.

== Early life and education ==
Originally from New York City, she grew up hearing about the West Coast because of her father, who was a California native. She and her husband moved to the Bay Area in 1962 to rejoin others of her family who had also left the East Coast. She had two sons and a daughter, both of whom she raised in Marin County, California.

She earned a B.S. in zoology from Mount Holyoke College and an M.S. in Microbiology from Yale University.

== Works ==
Phyllis specialized in marshland vegetation for more than 20 years, monitoring restoration projects in the San Francisco Bay Area. She also published two books on wetland plants. She taught biology classes at both College of Marin and Antioch University throughout her years.

Her passion for broader environmental issues and planning drove her involvement in a 1972 campaign to create the Coastal Zone Conservation Act, Proposition 20, which established regional planning to protect coastal resources. Phyllis served as Legislation Chair on the Chapter Board and also participated in the Scholarship Committee.

During the 1980s and 1990s, Phyllis served as the editor of the CNPS journal Fremontia. Beginning in 1989, she also took on the role of VP of Publications for CNPS, where she expanded the organization's publishing efforts. Under her leadership, CNPS released its first book, California’s Changing Landscapes. She was the editor of California’s Wild Gardens, which focused on the natural habitat of California. Phyllis was also a member of the state CNPS Development and Membership Committee.

In 1980, along with Ellen Strauss, she co-founded the Marin Agricultural Land Trust (MALT), the first such trust in the United States. The organization works to protect farmland in Marin County through the use of conservation easements, a model that has been replicated across the country. Faber published Common Wetland Plants of Coastal California in 1982.

In 1996, she was honored as a Fellow of CNPS, a distinction given to the organization’s most exceptional contributors and leaders. UC Press hired Phyllis as an editor to fully revise and update their collection of natural history guides.

== Death ==
Faber died on January 15, 2023 in Mill Valley, California.
