= Cannibalization (fiction) =

Cannibalization of fiction refers to adapting, borrowing or stealing plots, characters, themes or ideas from one story for use in another or from one medium to another, such as a film adaptation of a book.

Authors Michael Baigent and Richard Leigh alleged that fellow author Dan Brown had cannibalised their book The Holy Blood and the Holy Grail in writing The Da Vinci Code.

The Doctor Who television episode "Dalek" is an example of legitimate cannibalisation, the writer having adapted elements of the Doctor Who audio drama Jubilee for this television episode. Similarly, American author Raymond Chandler wrote stories, which he later re-edited and combined into novels in a process he called "cannibalizing". This practice is more widely known in publishing as a fix-up.

Over the recent decades it has become normal staple in modern Hollywood filmmaking, considering that many comic books are cannibalized into highly successful blockbuster films. Prime examples are from both the MCU and the DCEU.

== See also ==
- Plagiarism
