= Potato Fritz =

1976 film

- Directed by: Peter Schamoni
- Written by: Paul Hengge
- Produced by: Peter Schröder
- Starring: Hardy Krüger; Stephen Boyd; Anton Diffring
- Cinematography: Jost Vacano; Wolf Wirth
- Edited by: Peter Schamoni
- Music by: Udo Jürgens
- Production companies: Eucent Film; Peter Schamoni Film
- Distributed by: Jugendfilm-Verleih
- Release date: 6 May 1976
- Running time: 94 minutes
- Country: West Germany
- Language: German

Potato Fritz is a 1976 West German comedy western film directed by Peter Schamoni and starring Hardy Krüger, Stephen Boyd and Anton Diffring. It was considered an unconventional western, partly due to be made by Schamoni who was associated with New German Cinema. Location shooting took place in Spain. The film's sets were designed by the art director José María Tapiador. It is also known by the alternative title Montana Trap.

== Synopsis ==
Potato Fritz is part of a group of German settlers in Montana, known for growing potatoes. An ambush on a gold shipment through the Rocky Mountains leads to tensions in the area and he and his friend Bill head for nearby Fort Benton.

== Cast ==
- Hardy Krüger as Potato Fritz
- Stephen Boyd as Bill Ardisson
- Anton Diffring as Lieutnant Slade
- Friedrich von Ledebur as Martin Ross
- Arthur Brauss as James Wesley
- Luis Barboo as Dragoon Moss
- Dan van Husen as Smoothie Nestler
- Paul Breitner as Sergeant Stark
- Christiane Gött as Jane Antrim
- Diana Körner as Martha Comstock
- David Hess as Sleeve
- Rainer Basedow as Mirko Stavnik
- Malachy McCourt as Antrim
- Helmut Brasch as Duffield
- Carl Rapp as Colonel Baxter
- Bob Simmons as Lake
- Eva Bergmanova as Catherine Christie
- Meg Clancy as Adeline Bowie
- Francesca Kruger as Maria Giulini
- Gonzalo Cañas as Lieutenant Bowie
- Robert Chase as Dragoon Longford
- Jesus Fernandez as Dragoon Schlesinger
- Jorge Gleser as David Ross
- Juan Maján as Stuart Madsen
- Mariano Vidal Molina as Captain Lancombe
- Desmond Thompson as Daniel Ross
- David Thomson as Lowoll
- Fernando Villena as Major Field
- Peter Schamoni as Reverend Cavenham
- Pit Schröder as Soldier

== Bibliography ==
- Bock, Hans-Michael & Bergfelder, Tim. The Concise CineGraph. Encyclopedia of German Cinema. Berghahn Books, 2009.
- Weisser, Thomas. Spaghetti Westerns: The Good, the Bad and the Violent. McFarland, 2005.
