= Vegetation Classification and Mapping Program =

The Vegetation Classification and Mapping Program (VegCAMP) is the California component of the National Vegetation Classification System coordinated by the California Department of Fish and Wildlife. It implements vegetation assessment and vegetation mapping projects in high-priority conservation and management areas. It conducts training programs, classification of vegetation data, and fine-scale vegetation mapping.
