= Marian Dora =

German art director, cinematographer and actor

- Born: 1970 (age 55–56); Southern Germany
- Other names: M.D. Botulino, Art Doran, Marian Dallamano
- Occupations: Film director, cinematographer, screenwriter, editor, producer
- Years active: 1991–present
- Known for: Underground and extreme horror films
- Notable work: Cannibal (2006), Melancholie der Engel (2009), Carcinoma (2014)

Marian Dora (born in 1970 in Southern Germany) is the primary pseudonym of an anonymous German filmmaker associated with underground and extreme horror cinema. He is known for writing, directing, photographing, and frequently performing multiple other production roles on low-budget films that feature graphic violence, sexual content, and nihilistic themes. The name is reported to be an anagram of his real name; he has also worked under aliases including M.D. Botulino, Art Doran, and Marian Dallamano.

== Biography ==
Dora began making short films in the early 1990s within anonymous underground circles. Some early works circulated on the compilations Blue Snuff 1 and Blue Snuff 2 (the latter reported as withdrawn due to content).

From the mid-1990s, he collaborated with German director Ulli Lommel, contributing as producer, editor, or second-unit director on several direct-to-video titles, including Zombie Nation (2004), Green River Killer (2005), B.T.K. Killer (2005), and others.

Although Debris documentar was shot in 2003, Dora’s first widely noted feature as director was Cannibal (2006), a dramatization of the Armin Meiwes case. The project originated in connection with Lommel’s work for the U.S. market but was released independently after being rejected for its graphic content.

His third feature, Melancholie der Engel (English: The Angels’ Melancholy or The Melancholy of the Angels, 2009), premiered on 1 May 2009 at the Weekend of Fear festival. It received the "Best International Feature Film – Arthouse Genre Award" at the New York International Independent Film and Video Festival later that year. The film attracted significant controversy for its depictions of sexual violence, scatology, and animal harm; accounts differ on the extent to which certain sequences used real animal deaths versus staged effects or carcasses. Collaboration with frequent associate Carsten Frank (credited in some sources as Frank Oliver) ended after the production.

Subsequent feature-length works include Reise nach Agatis (2010), the delayed release of Debris documentar, a segment (“Mors in Tabula”) in the anthology The Profane Exhibit (2013), Carcinoma (2014, released under the name Art Doran), the double feature Das Verlangen der Maria D. / Pesthauch der Menschlichkeit (2018), and the documentary-style Thomas und Marco (2022).

A multi-disc DVD box set titled The World of Marian Dora was issued in 2014 by the BUT (B-Movies, Underground, and Trash) Film Festival in cooperation with Zeno Pictures; it collected Melancholie der Engel, Reise nach Agatis, and Debris documentar along with short films and extras. Dora has stated in interviews that his films deliberately incorporate elements of reality and minimal resources as part of an underground aesthetic, and that he maintains anonymity for legal and personal reasons.

== Style and influences ==
Dora’s work draws on 1970s European exploitation and mondo cinema (including directors such as Gualtiero Jacopetti, Ruggero Deodato, and Sergio Martino) as well as literary and philosophical sources including Goethe, Nietzsche, and the Marquis de Sade. Musical references frequently include composers associated with Italian genre cinema of the period.

== Selected filmography ==
=== Feature films ===
- Cannibal (2006)
- Melancholie der Engel (2009)
- Reise nach Agatis (2010)
- Debris documentar (shot 2003; released later)
- The Profane Exhibit (segment “Mors in Tabula”, 2013)
- Carcinoma (2014; as Art Doran)
- Pesthauch der Menschlichkeit (2018)
- Der Verlangen der Maria D. (2018)
- Thomas und Marco (2022)

=== Short films and other ===
Numerous short films from the 1990s onward (titles and exact dates often vary across databases), including works circulated under the Blue Snuff compilations and individual titles such as Caribbean Sunrise, Carnophage, and others. Full credits for many of the early short films remain incomplete.

- Proud Off (c. 1991)
- Christian B. (c. 1996)
- Opus Hominis 1 / Opus Hominis 2 (mid-1990s)
- Science (c. 1998)
- Sane Impression 1 / Sane Impression 2 (mid-2000s)
- Polydipsia (c. 2004)
- Carnophage (c. 2000)
- Vita Minima / Vita minima (c. 2000)
- Caribbean Sunrise (c. 2002)
- Der Puppenschänder 1 / Der Puppenschänder 2
- Es geschah in Gotha
- Journey Into Perversion (behind-the-scenes related to Jess Franco’s Incubus)
- Subcimitero 1 / Subcimitero 2: Guanajuato
- The Devil’s Possessed – Behind the Scenes of Jess Franco’s Incubus
- The Devil’s Torturer
- An einem Morgen im Frühling
- Provokation 1 / Provokation 2
- Sad Impression
- Sommerliebelei
- Cadavericon
- Agonie
- Hommage an Peter Martell
- In Memoriam Carl Andersen
- Reflektionen über das Wesentliche
- Erotic Fantasy / Erotic Fulfillment
- Morbid Montage
