= Robert Pickton =

Canadian serial killer (1949–2024)

- Pickton in 1996
- Born: Robert William Pickton; October 24, 1949; Port Coquitlam, British Columbia, Canada
- Died: May 31, 2024 (aged 74); Quebec City, Quebec, Canada
- Other names: Willie Pickton; The Pig Farmer Killer; The Butcher; Pig Man
- Status: Deceased
- Conviction: Second-degree murder (6 counts)
- Penalty: Life imprisonment (no parole eligibility for 25 years)

Details
- Victims: 6 convicted 26 confirmed 49 confessed
- Span of crimes: 1983 – 2001 (confirmed)
- Country: Canada
- Date apprehended: February 22, 2002

Robert William Pickton (October 24, 1949 – May 31, 2024), also known as the Pig Farmer Killer or the Butcher, was a Canadian pig farmer and serial killer. He is believed to have murdered at least 26 women, many of them sex workers from Vancouver's Downtown Eastside. He confessed to forty-nine murders to an undercover RCMP officer. In 2007, he was convicted on six counts of second-degree murder and sentenced to life in prison with no possibility of parole for 25 years—the longest possible sentence for second-degree murder under Canadian law at the time.

In 2010, the Crown attorney officially stayed the remaining 20 murder charges, allowing previously unrevealed information to be made available to the public, including that Pickton had previously had a 1997 attempted murder charge dropped. Crown prosecutors reasoned that staying the additional charges made the most sense, since Pickton was already serving the maximum sentence allowable.

The discovery of Pickton's crimes sparked widespread outrage and forced the Canadian government to acknowledge the crisis of missing and murdered Indigenous women, with the British Columbia provincial government forming the Missing Women Commission of Inquiry to examine the role of the police in the matter. Pickton died on May 31, 2024, after being attacked in prison by another inmate.

== Early life and criminal history ==
Robert William Pickton was born on October 24, 1949, to Leonard Francis Pickton (1896–1978) and Louise Helene Arnal (1912–1979), pig farmers in Port Coquitlam, British Columbia, 27 kilometres (17 miles) east of Vancouver. Pickton's older sister was sent to live with relatives in Vancouver when her parents decided a pig farm would be an inappropriate setting to raise a young girl.

From an early age, Robert and his younger brother David worked at the family's farm at 953 Dominion Avenue. Pickton was strongly attached to his mother but rarely interacted with his abusive father. Pickton's mother was very demanding, forcing her sons to work long hours raising livestock. His mother prioritized the pigs over her sons' personal hygiene, often sending her sons to school in dirty clothes, reeking of manure and earning both the nickname "Stinky Piggy". Pickton struggled in school, being put in a special education class after failing grade two. When he was twelve years old, Pickton began raising a calf which became his beloved pet. After two weeks, he couldn't find the calf after school. Pickton was told to check the barn and was distraught to find it had been slaughtered.

After dropping out of school in 1963, Pickton worked as a meat cutter for nearly seven years before leaving to work full-time at his family's farm. After the deaths of their parents in the late 1970s, the Pickton siblings inherited the farm and sold parts of it to developers for C$5.16 million.

On March 23, 1997, Pickton was charged with the attempted murder of prostitute Wendy Lynn Eistetter, whom he had stabbed four times during an attack at his farm. Eistetter told police Pickton handcuffed her and inflicted lacerations upon her body. She escaped, disarmed Pickton and stabbed him with his own knife. Pickton sought treatment at Eagle Ridge Hospital, while Eistetter recovered at a nearby emergency room. Pickton was eventually released on C$2,000 bond. The attempted murder charge against Pickton was stayed on January 27, 1998, when prosecutors determined that Eistetter, a drug addict, was too unstable for her testimony to help secure a conviction.

Pickton hosted parties at a nightclub called Piggy's Palace in a converted slaughterhouse at the farm. Events at the venue attracted up to 2,000 people, including political and business figures as well as Hells Angels members. Pickton and his brother were sued by Port Coquitlam officials for violating zoning ordinances—neglecting the agriculture for which it had been zoned and having altered a farm building for the purpose of holding recreations. The Picktons registered a non-profit charity, the Piggy Palace Good Times Society, with the Canadian government in 1996, claiming to organize events on behalf of worthy groups. After flouting legal requirements and holding a New Year's Eve party, the brothers were served an injunction banning gatherings. The charity's non-profit status was removed after failing to produce financial statements, and the charity was disbanded.

During this period, multiple disappearances of women in the Lower Mainland, mostly from the impoverished Downtown Eastside area of Vancouver, led to media speculation that a serial killer was active. An employee of Pickton found several purses belonging to missing women and reported him to police. Police conducted three searches of the farm but found no evidence. In June 1999, police received a tip that Pickton had a freezer full of human flesh in his farmhouse; this information was ignored.

== Discovery and investigation ==
On February 6, 2002, police executed a search warrant for illegal firearms at the Pickton property. Both Pickton brothers were arrested and police obtained a second warrant using what they had seen on the property to search the farm. Personal items belonging to missing women were found and the farm was sealed off by members of the joint RCMP–Vancouver Police Department task force. The following day, Pickton was charged with weapons offences. Both Picktons were released and Robert was kept under police surveillance.

On February 22, 2002, Robert Pickton was arrested again and charged with two counts of first-degree murder in the deaths of Sereena Abotsway and Mona Wilson. On April 2, three more charges were added for the murders of Jacqueline McDonell, Dianne Rock, and Heather Bottomley. A sixth for the murder of Andrea Joesbury was laid on April 9, followed by a seventh for Brenda Wolfe. On September 20, four more were added for Georgina Papin, Patricia Johnson, Helen Hallmark, and Jennifer Furminger. Another four for Heather Chinnock, Tanya Holyk, Sherry Irving, and Inga Hall were laid on October 3. On May 26, 2005, 12 more came for Cara Ellis, Andrea Borhaven, Debra Lynne Jones, Marnie Frey, Tiffany Drew, Kerry Koski, Sarah de Vries, Cynthia Feliks, Angela Jardine, Wendy Crawford, Diana Melnick, and Jane Doe, bringing the total to 27.

Excavations continued at the farm through November 2003; the cost of the investigation was estimated at C$70 million by the end of 2003. The property was fenced off under lien by the Crown in Right of British Columbia and remained so as of 2023. In the meantime all the buildings except a small barn had been demolished. Forensic analysis proved difficult because the bodies may have decomposed or been eaten by insects and pigs.

During the early days of the excavations, forensic anthropologists brought in heavy equipment, including two 50-foot (15-metre) flat conveyor belts and soil sifters to find human remains. On March 10, 2004, the government revealed that Pickton may have ground up human flesh and mixed it with pork that he sold to the public; the province's health authority later issued a warning. Another claim was made that he fed the bodies directly to his pigs. In 2003, a preliminary hearing was held and the clothes and rubber boots that Pickton had been wearing during the Eistetter assault were seized by police from an RCMP storage locker. In 2004, the DNA of Borhaven and Ellis was found on the items.

== Trial ==
Pickton's trial began on January 30, 2006, in the Supreme Court of British Columbia in New Westminster. Pickton pleaded not guilty to the 27 charges of first-degree murder. The voir dire phase of the trial took most of the year to determine what evidence might be admitted before the jury. Reporters were barred from disclosing material presented in argument. On March 17, one count was rejected by Justice James Williams for lack of evidence. On August 9, Justice Williams severed the charges into one group of six counts and another of twenty.

The trial proceeded on the six counts. Full details of the decision were not made publicly available, but Justice Williams explained that trying all 26 charges at once would put an unreasonable burden on the jury as the trial could have lasted up to two years, and would increase the possibility of mistrial. The remaining 20 charges were stayed on August 4, 2010.

On January 22, 2007, Pickton faced first-degree murder charges in the deaths of Frey, Abotsway, Papin, Joesbury, Wolfe, and Wilson. The media ban was lifted and details of the investigation were publicly released:

- About eighty unidentified DNA profiles, roughly half male and half female, had been detected.
- In Pickton's trailer were found: a loaded .22 revolver with a dildo over the barrel and one round fired, boxes of .357 Magnum handgun ammunition, night-vision goggles, two pairs of faux fur-lined handcuffs, a syringe with three millilitres of blue liquid inside, and "Spanish fly" aphrodisiac. In a videotape played to the jury, Pickton claimed to have attached the dildo to his weapon as a makeshift silencer; this explanation is impractical at best, as most revolvers are impossible to silence without extensive modification.
- A videotape of Pickton's friend Scott Chubb saying Pickton had told him a good way to kill a female heroin addict was to inject her with windshield washer fluid. A second tape, in which Pickton's associate Andrew Bellwood said Pickton mentioned killing sex workers by handcuffing and strangling them, then bleeding and gutting them before feeding them to pigs.
- Photos of the contents of a garbage can found in Pickton's slaughterhouse, which held remains of victim Mona Wilson.

On December 9, 2007, the jury found Pickton not guilty on six counts of first-degree murder, but guilty on six counts of second-degree murder. On December 11, 2007, after reading eighteen victim impact statements, Judge Williams sentenced Pickton to life with no possibility of parole for 25 years—the maximum punishment for second-degree murder, and equal to the sentence for first-degree murder—stating: "Mr. Pickton's conduct was murderous and repeatedly so. I cannot know the details but I know this: What happened to them was senseless and despicable."

== Victims ==
On December 9, 2007, Pickton was convicted of second-degree murder in the deaths of six women:

- Count One: Serena Abotsway, 29, reported missing on August 22, 2001
- Count Two: Mona Lee Wilson, 26, reported missing on November 30, 2001
- Count Six: Andrea Joesbury, 22, reported missing June 8, 2001
- Count Seven: Brenda Ann Wolfe, 32, reported missing on April 25, 2000
- Count Eleven: Georgina Faith Papin, 34, reported missing in March 2001
- Count Sixteen: Marnie Lee Anne Frey, 24, reported missing on December 29, 1997

Pickton also stood accused of first-degree murder in the deaths of 21 other women. These charges were stayed on August 4, 2010:

- Count Three: Jacquelene Michelle McDonell, 22, reported missing on January 16, 1999
- Count Four: Dianne Rosemary Rock, 34, reported missing on December 13, 2001
- Count Five: Heather Kathleen Bottomley, 27, reported missing on April 17, 2001
- Count Eight: Jennifer Lynn Furminger, 28, reported missing on December 27, 1999
- Count Nine: Helen Mae Hallmark, 20, reported missing on June 15, 1997
- Count Ten: Patricia Rose Johnson, 25, reported missing on January 2, 2001
- Count Twelve: Heather Gabrielle Chinnock, 30, last seen in April 2001
- Count Thirteen: Tanya Holyk, 23, reported missing on November 3, 1996
- Count Fourteen: Sherry Leigh Irving, 24, reported missing on February 22, 1997
- Count Fifteen: Inga Monique Hall, 46, last seen in February 1998
- Count Seventeen: Tiffany Louise Drew, 27, reported missing on December 31, 1999
- Count Eighteen: Sarah Jean de Vries, 29, last seen in April 1998
- Count Nineteen: Cynthia "Cindy" Feliks, 43, last seen in December 1997
- Count Twenty: Angela Rebecca Jardine, 27, reported missing on November 20, 1998
- Count Twenty-One: Diana Melnick, 23, last seen in December 1995
- Count Twenty-Two: Mission Jane Doe, discovered on February 25, 1995
- Count Twenty-Three: Debra Lynne Jones, 42, last seen in December 2000
- Count Twenty-Four: Wendy Crawford, 43, last seen in December 1999
- Count Twenty-Five: Kerry Lynn Koski, 38, reported missing on January 7, 1998
- Count Twenty-Six: Andrea Fay Borhaven, 25, last seen in March 1997
- Count Twenty-Seven: Cara Louise Ellis, 25, reported missing on January 21, 1997

Pickton was implicated in the deaths of but not charged with the murders of four women:

- Mary Ann Clark, 25, disappeared in August 1991.
- Stephanie Lane, 20, disappeared January 1997; her partial remains were found but misplaced 2003 to 2010
- Dawn Teresa Crey, 42, last seen in December 2000
- Yvonne Marie Boen, 33, reported missing on March 16, 2001

After Pickton was arrested, witness Lynn Ellingsen came forward to authorities claiming to have seen Pickton skinning a woman hanging from a meat hook years earlier and claimed she had not told anyone about it out of fear of losing her life. However, Ellingsen admitted she had blackmailed Pickton about the incident on more than one occasion.

The victims' children filed a civil lawsuit in May 2013 against the Vancouver Police Department, the Royal Canadian Mounted Police, and the Crown for failing to protect the victims. They reached a settlement in March 2014, and each child was compensated C$50,000 (equivalent to C$65,575 in 2025), without admission of liability.

== British Columbia Court of Appeal ==
=== Crown appeal ===
On January 7, 2008, the Attorney General filed an appeal in the British Columbia Court of Appeal, against Pickton's acquittals on the first-degree murder charges. The grounds of appeal related to a number of evidentiary rulings made by the trial judge, certain aspects of the trial judge's jury instructions, and the ruling to sever the six charges Pickton was tried on from the remaining twenty. Although Pickton had been acquitted on the first-degree murder charges, he was convicted of second-degree murder and received the same sentence as he would have on first-degree murder convictions. The relatives of the victims expressed concern that the convictions would be jeopardized if the Crown argued that the trial judge had made errors. Opposition critic Leonard Krog criticized the Attorney-General for not having briefed the victims' families in advance.

Wally Oppal apologized to the victims' families for not informing them of the appeal before it was announced to the general public. Oppal also said that the appeal was filed largely for "strategic" reasons, in anticipation of an appeal by the defence. Under the applicable rules of court, the time period for the Crown to appeal expired thirty days after December 9, when the verdicts were rendered, while the time period for the defence to appeal expired thirty days after December 11, when Pickton was sentenced.

=== Defence appeal ===
On January 9, 2008, lawyers for Pickton filed a notice of appeal in the British Columbia Court of Appeal, seeking a new trial on six counts of second-degree murder. The notice of appeal enumerated various areas in which the defence alleged that the trial judge had erred: the main charge to the jury, the response to the jurors' questions, amending the jury charge, similar fact evidence, and Pickton's statements to the police.

=== Decisions ===
The British Columbia Court of Appeal issued its decisions on June 25, 2009, including some banned from publication. It dismissed the defence appeal by a 2:1 majority. Due to a dissent on a point of law, Pickton was entitled to appeal to the Supreme Court of Canada, without first seeking leave to appeal. His notice of appeal was filed in the Supreme Court of Canada on August 24, 2009. The Court of Appeal allowed the Crown appeal, finding that the trial judge had erred in excluding some evidence and in severing six counts from the rest. The order resulting from this severance was stayed, so that the conviction on the six counts of second-degree murder was not set aside.

== Supreme Court appeal ==
On June 26, 2009, Pickton's lawyers confirmed that they would exercise his right to appeal to the Supreme Court of Canada. The appeal was based on the dissent in the British Columbia Court of Appeal. While Pickton had an automatic right to appeal to the Supreme Court of Canada based on the legal issues on which Justice Donald had dissented, Pickton's lawyers applied to the Supreme Court of Canada for leave to appeal on other issues as well. On November 26, 2009, the Supreme Court of Canada granted this application for leave to appeal. The effect of this was to broaden the scope of Pickton's appeal, allowing him to raise arguments that had been rejected unanimously in the British Columbia Court of Appeal. On July 30, 2010, the Supreme Court of Canada rendered its decision dismissing Pickton's appeal and affirming his convictions. The argument that Pickton should be granted a new trial was unanimously rejected by the Justices of the Supreme Court of Canada.

Although unanimous in its result, the Supreme Court split six to three in its legal analysis of the case. The issue was whether the trial judge had made a legal error in his instructions to the jury, and in particular in his "re-instruction" responding to the jury's question about Pickton's liability if he was not the only person involved. Writing for the majority, Madam Justice Charron found that "the trial judge's response to the question posed by the jury did not adversely impact on the fairness of the trial". She further found that the trial judge's overall instructions with respect to other suspects "compendiously captured the alternative routes to liability that were realistically in issue in this trial. The jury was also correctly instructed that it could convict Mr. Pickton if the Crown proved this level of participation coupled with the requisite intent." Justice Louis LeBel, writing for the minority, found that the jury had not been properly informed "of the legal principles which would have allowed them as triers of fact to consider evidence of Mr. Pickton's aid and encouragement to an unknown shooter, as an alternative means of imposing liability for the murders".

== Judicial aftermath ==
=== Discontinuance of prosecution ===
British Columbia Crown spokesman Neil MacKenzie announced that prosecution of the 20 other murder charges would likely be discontinued: "In reaching this position, the branch has taken into account the fact that any additional convictions could not result in any increase to the sentence that Mr. Pickton has already received." Families of the victims had varied reactions to this announcement. Some were disappointed that Pickton would never be convicted of the twenty other murders, while others were relieved that the gruesome details of the murders would not be aired in court.

=== Management review of investigation ===
In 2010, the Vancouver Police Department issued a statement that an "exhaustive management review of the Missing Women Investigation" had been conducted, and the Vancouver Police Department would make the Review available to the public once the criminal matters are concluded and the publication bans are removed. In addition, the Vancouver Police Department disclosed that for several years it has "communicated privately to the Provincial Government that it believed a Public Inquiry would be necessary for an impartial examination of why it took so long for Robert Pickton to be arrested". In August 2010, the publication ban imposed during Pickton's trial in 2006 was lifted. The journalist Jerry Langton wrote: "The now-public details of the investigation and trial appalled many. The unwillingness of the police to pursue Pickton, despite overwhelming evidence, smacked hard of racism, sexism, and bias against drug addicts and sex workers. Many felt that the police treated crimes against aboriginals, drug addicts, sex workers and, in particular women, as less important than they should have". The Pickton case seriously damaged the image of the police forces of the Lower Mainland.

=== Apology by police department ===
At a press conference, Deputy Chief Constable Doug LePard of the Vancouver Police Department apologized to the victims' families: "I wish from the bottom of my heart that we would have caught him sooner. I wish that, the several agencies involved, that we could have done better in so many ways. I wish that all the mistakes that were made, we could undo. And I wish that more lives would have been saved. So on my behalf and behalf of the Vancouver Police Department and all the men and women that worked on this investigation, I would say to the families how sorry we all are for your losses and because we did not catch this monster sooner."

=== Inquiry ===
After Pickton lost his final appeal at the Supreme Court of Canada, the Missing Women Commission of Inquiry chaired by Wally Oppal was called to examine the role of the Vancouver police and the Royal Canadian Mounted Police in the disappearances and murders of women in the Downtown Eastside. Families of the missing and murdered women had been calling for public hearings since before Pickton was arrested and eventually convicted of six murders. The commission's final report submission to the Attorney General was dated November 19, 2012, and was released to the public on December 17. During the inquiry, lawyers for some of the victims' families sought to have an unpublished 289-page manuscript authored by former police investigator Lorimer Shenher entered as evidence and made entirely public. Several passages were read into the inquiry's record but Commissioner Oppal declined to publicize the entire manuscript. As an extension of The Missing Women Commission of Inquiry, the National Inquiry into Missing and Murdered Indigenous Women and Girls was formed by the Government of Canada in September 2016.

=== Transfer to penitentiary ===
During a court hearing on August 4, 2010, Judge Williams stated that Pickton should be committed to a federal penitentiary; up to that point he had been held at a provincial pretrial institution. In June 2018, he was transferred from Kent Institution in British Columbia to Port-Cartier Institution in Quebec.

=== Parole eligibility ===
In February 2024, Pickton became eligible to apply for day parole. No Parole Board of Canada hearing was scheduled.

== Death ==
On May 19, 2024, Pickton was attacked by another prisoner at the Port-Cartier Institution in Quebec. The prisoner, Martin Charest, described as having a history of assaulting other prisoners, took a broomstick, broke the handle, and shoved it into Pickton's face. Correctional officers intervened, handcuffed Charest, and took him to the Structured Intervention Unit. Pickton was airlifted to a hospital and put on life support. He died at a hospital in Quebec City from complications of the attack on May 31. In July 2025, Charest was charged with first-degree murder. He pleaded guilty, saying he did it for Pickton's victims.

== Media and merchandise ==
A major plotline in the Canadian crime drama Da Vinci's Inquest deals with a spate of missing women thought to be victims of a prolific serial killer hunting in Vancouver's Downtown Eastside. Pickton is not directly referred to by name, but starting in the show's fifth season characters and advertisements made reference to "the pig farm" in relation to the case.

In August 2006, Thomas Loudamy, a 27-year-old Fremont, California, resident, claimed that he had received three letters from Pickton in response to letters Loudamy sent under an assumed identity. Loudamy, an aspiring journalist, claimed that his motivation in releasing the letters was to help the public gain insights into Pickton.

Killer Pickton is a 2005 American horror film loosely based on Pickton's killings.

In 2015, a film with the working title of Full Flood began production in Vancouver by CBC-TV. Based on Stevie Cameron's book On The Farm, it was to use the life experiences of Pickton's victims for a fictional story about women in the Downtown Eastside who became victims of a serial killer. Pickton was portrayed by Ben Cotton in the film. In 2016, the film was released under the title Unclaimed, and also as On the Farm in certain markets.

In 2009, the Criminal Minds season 4 two-part finale, "To Hell ... And Back", based the storyline on Pickton's case. Though names and locations were changed (Pickton's character was named Mason Turner, and acts take place in Ontario instead of British Columbia), many key details were used, including two brothers living on a run-down family pig farm who would abduct sex workers and homeless women and bringing them back to the farm before feeding the remains to the pigs.

In 2011, Vancouver artist Pamela Masik planned to mount an art exhibition, The Forgotten, featuring portraits of some of Pickton's victims, at the University of British Columbia's Museum of Anthropology, which declined to host it after some controversy. The incident was profiled by Damon Vignale in the 2013 documentary film The Exhibition.

In 2011, a documentary was released, titled The Pig Farm, which outlined the flawed investigative work by the RCMP and the Vancouver Police Service. Details emerged about the impossibly long list of suspects, departmental in-fighting and lack of resources.

In 2016, a purported autobiography, Pickton: In his Own Words, was released. Its publication and marketing initiated controversy, critical petitions, and government action to stop him from profiting from the work. Pig Killer, a biopic written and directed by Chad Ferrin, starring Jake Busey as Pickton, was released in select theatres on November 17, 2023.

In 2024, Alberta-based comedy troupe Danger Cats listed satirical T-shirts for sale online which featured a caricature of Pickton headlined with a logo reading "Pickton Farms" and the tagline "Over 50 flavors of hookery smoked bacon". The shirts caused controversy, and prompted the cancellation of several upcoming performances by the troupe. British Columbia premier David Eby expressed his outrage: "All I can say is how deeply disappointed I am by the idea that the lives of vulnerable women could be trivialized like this." Danger Cats released a statement on social media saying, "The Pickton T-Shirt has been removed from our website and all proceeds will go to Ukraine."

In 2025, the TV series Dexter: Resurrection referenced Pickton as "The Pig Farmer" in regard to the character Leon Prater, who hosted a group of, and parties with, serial killers. It was said Pickton did similar, but is just a twisting of the different events held at Pickton's farm.

== See also ==
- Gilbert Paul Jordan
- List of serial killers by country
- List of serial killers by number of victims
