= California Native Plant Society =

US non-profit organization

California Native Plant Society (CNPS)
- Founded: 1965
- Type: Non-profit organization
- Purpose: Preservation and education
- Region served: California
- Website: cnps.org

The California Native Plant Society (CNPS) is a California environmental nonprofit organization (501(c)(3)) that seeks to increase understanding of California's native flora and to preserve it for future generations. The mission of CNPS is to conserve California native plants and their natural habitats, and increase understanding, appreciation, and horticultural use of native plants throughout the entire state and the California Floristic Province.

== History ==
California Native Plant Society was founded in 1965 by professional botanists and grassroots activists who, after saving an important native plant garden in Berkeley's Tilden Regional Park, were inspired to create an ongoing organization with the mission to save and promote the native plants of California.

== Structure ==
For 50 years, professional CNPS staff and volunteers have worked alongside scientists, government officials, and regional planners to protect habitats and species, and to advocate for well-informed environmental practices, regulations, and policies. The organization works at the local level through the various regional chapters, and at the state level through its five major programs, board of directors, Chapter Council, and state office.

CNPS continues to be a grassroots organization, with nearly 10,000 members and volunteers in 35 chapters covering the state of California and northwest Baja California. Chapter volunteers promote CNPS’s mission to conserve California’s native plants and their natural habitats, and to increase the horticultural uses of native plants at the local level. Membership is open to everyone, and chapter activities ranging from field trips, restoration activities, meetings, symposia, public garden maintenance, plant sales, and more are open to the public.

At the state organizational level, CNPS has five core programs in Conservation, Rare Plant Science, Vegetation Science, Education, and Horticulture. Each program has dedicated CNPS staff supported by volunteer committees consisting of experienced botanical experts, conservation advocates, professionals, educators, and community activists.

== Activities ==
Chapters of CNPS organize many events of local significance. In keeping with the public outreach and education mission of the society, these events are generally free and open to the public.

- Wildflower shows
- Native garden tours
- Native plant sales in spring and fall
- General public program meetings
- Lectures, talks, and workshops
- Public demonstration gardens
- Local restoration projects
- Field trips
- Local publications

CNPS maintains the online Inventory of Rare and Endangered Plants, which catalogs the California Rare Plant Ranks (known as "CNPS Lists" prior to 2010). The Inventory and its ranking system remain the most widely adopted source of information about California’s special rare plants today and is used on a daily basis by scientists, land planners, and agency officials. CNPS also created A Manual of California Vegetation publication and online database, the standard vegetation reference now relied upon by state and federal agencies. Both of these resources are recognized as the most advanced available for identifying and managing critical habitat in California.

A popular project in collaboration between the Education and Rare Plant Programs is the "Rare Plant Treasure Hunt", or RPTH. In the first five years of the RPTH project, between the 2010-2014 seasons, volunteers and staff successfully updated over 2,500 occurrences of rare, threatened, and endangered species to both the California Rare Plant Ranks and California Department of Fish and Wildlife's California Natural Diversity Database (CNDDB). Over 1,000 of these recorded occurrences were new to science. A new offshoot of the RPTH is the California Rare Plant Seed Rescue Project, in which volunteers will collect seeds and tissue from every population of rare plants in California, and seed bank them in long-term storage facilities to protect them against future extinction.

In 2010, the California Native Plant Society was successful in having the state legislature designate the third week in April each year as "California Native Plant Week". The legislature recognized that "California native plants, being perfectly suited to California's climate and soil, require far fewer fertilizers, soil amendments, or pesticides, and use 60 to 90 percent less water than conventional landscapes".

The California Native Plant Society also organizes a triennial conservation conference every three years which hosts over 1000 attendees from across California and beyond, and an annual conservation symposium every September.

=== Publications ===
Besides books, bulletins, and posters, the society publishes the academic journal Artemisia (previously Fremontia), devoted to botany, horticulture, vegetation science, land management, CNPS projects, and related native plant topics, three times a year, and the CNPS Bulletin, a quarterly newsletter.

=== Calscape ===
Calscape, started in 2016, is a website with a database of California native plants, native pollinators, and local plant nurseries. It aggregates information from, among other sources, Wikipedia, Jepson eFlora, Calflora, the book Seed Propagation of Native California Plants, and local nurseries' cultivar descriptions. Users can search for plants by name or location, cross reference plants and pollinators, find nurseries selling a plant, and save personal lists.

== See also ==
- Native plant gardening

== Bibliography ==
- Ritter, Matt (2018). California Plants: A Guide to Our Iconic Flora. San Luis Obispo, California: Pacific Street Publishing. ISBN 978-0-9998960-0-6.
