= Melancholie der Engel =

2009 German horror film by Marian Dora

- DVD cover
- Directed by: Marian Dora
- Written by: Marian Dora; Carsten Frank (Note: Credited as Frank Oliver.)
- Produced by: Georg Treml
- Starring: Carsten Frank; Zenza Raggi
- Cinematography: Marian Dora
- Edited by: Marian Dora
- Music by: Samuel Dalferth
- Production company: Authentic Film
- Distributed by: Shock Entertainment
- Release date: 1 May 2009 (Weekend of Fear)
- Running time: 165 minutes
- Country: Germany
- Language: German

Melancholie der Engel is a 2009 German independent extreme horror film directed, shot, and edited by Marian Dora, who co-wrote the screenplay with Carsten Frank. The film stars Frank and Zenza Raggi as old friends who reunite and return to a house with a dark past.

Melancholie der Engel premiered at the Weekend of Fear Festival on 1 May 2009, and polarised critics upon release; some praised Dora's cinematography, but most condemned the film as an exploitative work showing repetitive and meaningless depravity to communicate a nihilistic message. Its depictions of sexual violence and legitimate animal cruelty have garnered widespread controversy. Despite its negative reception, it became a cult film amongst fans of extreme cinema.

== Plot ==
A man named Katze meets with his old friend, Brauth. Together, they go to a carnival where they meet two sixteen-year-old girls, Melanie and Bianca. At a bar, a woman named Anja joins them. Katze and Brauth take the group to an old house where the two men have a dark past. On the way, Katze shows signs of illness.

On their second night in the house, Heinrich, an elderly artist who claims to be a dead man, arrives, accompanied by a young woman named Clarissa, who is in a wheelchair and has a colostomy. The group consumes alcohol, opium and cocaine while discussing their different philosophies on life. Katze, Brauth and Anja reveal their nihilistic nature to the two girls, claiming they wish for there to be no life after this one. Katze cuts Anja's breast with a scalpel, to which she reacts with pleasure.

The following morning, the group travels to a pond near a factory, where Brauth reveals that Katze does not have much time to live. Katze meets a nun near a farm who leads him to a neighboring church. The nun begins to pray and then undresses and masturbates while Katze enters the crypts, watching the tombs with morbid curiosity; at the same time, Melanie assists in hunting and slaughtering a pig, and Brauth rapes Anja.

That night, Brauth, tired of Clarissa's laments, drags her into a basement. He tortures her by ripping out her ostomy bag, jamming his fingers into the stoma, then throwing her from her wheelchair and abandoning her. During the night, Bianca awakens and claims that she "heard the voice of the dead." Katze checks and finds nothing but a rabbit that had been hanged by Heinrich. Katze beheads the rabbit and takes the head to bed with him. He has a dream in which he frolics naked in a field with the dead rabbit before burying it.

Brauth walks with Melanie and Bianca the next day, and he tells them that even after knowing Katze for many years, they struggle to understand each other due to their philosophical differences. Meanwhile, Katze and Anja embrace sexually and Katze reveals his final hours are upon him.

Brauth locks Melanie and Bianca in a stable while they are drugged and tied together, before sending Heinrich to abuse them. However, the two girls escape. Heinrich later abuses Clarissa and Katze has a breakdown and falls asleep naked in a corner. The next morning, Heinrich takes Clarissa out to a cliff side which she proceeds to throw herself off of. Anja finds the remains of the butchered pig and is sexually excited by touching them. Melanie digs up the remains of a fetus.

Anja finds Katze in a visibly upset state. In a flashback sequence, Katze reflects on his life, loneliness, loss and misery. When Katze snaps back to reality, Anja begins comforting him before he throws her onto the ground, proceeding to urinate and defecate onto her.

Katze begins attacking Bianca by ripping her panties off, wiping his anus with them and forcing them into her mouth, then forcing her to vomit by shoving his finger into her throat. Heinrich starts beating Melanie, but this upsets Katze who, along with Anja, pulls Heinrich off of her.

Katze states his conflicts with Heinrich have gone too far as Heinrich turns his violence on Bianca which sparks no reaction from Melanie. Brauth urinates on Bianca and she flees. Brauth, Katze, Anja and Heinrich follow her outside where they proceed to beat her. Brauth removes her ovaries with a knife. Simultaneously, Melanie masturbates while watching a videotape of Katze and Brauth mutilating a pregnant woman and killing the fetus.

Brauth and Katze take Heinrich onto a river, where they disembowel him. That night, they burn his remains on a pyre and the group rejoices at his death. Melanie cuts off the eyes of a snail and Katze is blinded by a spark.

The next morning, the group attempts to comfort Katze. Anja escorts him to his grave where he dies and is buried along with his belongings. Brauth embraces a distraught Melanie and the two stay at the house while Anja and the nun leave together.

== Cast ==
- Carsten Frank as Katze
- Zenza Raggi as Brauth
- Janette Weller as Melanie
- Roxanne Keys (Note: Credited as Bianca Schneider.) as Bianca
- Patrizia Johann as Anja S.
- Peter Martell as Heinrich
- Margarethe von Stern as Clarissa
- Martina Adora as Novizin
- Marc Anton as Mönch
- Tobias Sickert as Großer Mann
- Ulli Lommel as Katze als Engel (voice)
- Jens Geutebrück as Priest

== Production ==
The film had been planned since 2003, but shooting was delayed due to financial issues. In September 2006, production began and the film was shot over a three-week period, later described by director Marian Dora as the worst time of his life. Other than Carsten Frank, who co-wrote the film with Dora, members of the cast had no access to the script. After shooting was completed, artistic disagreements regarding the censorship of some scenes resulted in Frank distancing himself from the project and having certain sequences shot for the film destroyed.

== Release ==
The Angels' Melancholia premiered at the Weekend of Fear Festival in Erlangen and Nuremberg on 1 May 2009. It was also screened at the New York International Independent Film and Video Festival in New York City on 27 October 2009, where it won Best International Feature Film – Arthouse Genre. It was later screened at the B-Movies, Underground, and Trash Film Festival in the Netherlands on 7 June 2013. The DVD was released on 30 July 2010 in Austria.

An extended version, running 165 minutes, was released in 2015 by XT Video, marking its Blu-Ray debut. Subsequently, the film made its home video debut in the US in 2020 with a Blu-Ray edition by PCM media, featuring the extended cut as well as the 2017 documentary Revisiting Melancholie der Engel. In 2021, a mediabook edition from Italian distributor Tetro Video was also released.

== Reception ==
=== Critical reception ===
Sean Leonard of HorrorNews.net stated that the film was "beautifully shot" but that its "pretentious dialogue" and focus on shock rather than story made it impossible to enjoy. Severed Cinema's Ray Casta panned the film, highlighting the pacing and long runtime, and called it "a depraved, perverse, and nihilistic endurance test".

Collider placed the film on their list of "The Most Disturbing Movies of All Time", while Taste of Cinema ranked the film at No. 22 on their list of "The 25 Most Disturbing Horror Movies of All Time", writing that "often described as having beautiful cinematography and being an art house style movie, it suffers from a bloated running time of 165 minutes and a very weak narrative". Moviepilot placed the film at No. 1 in its list of "10 Amazing Movies − Not Fit For Human Consumption".
