= Cannibal (2006 film) =

2006 German horror film directed by Marian Dora

- DVD cover
- Directed by: Marian Dora
- Screenplay by: Marian Dora
- Produced by: Frank Oliver; Marian Dora
- Starring: Victor Brandl; Carsten Frank
- Cinematography: Marian Dora
- Edited by: Marian Dora
- Music by: J.G. Thirlwell; Victor Brandl; Ghazi Barakat; Alexander Hacke
- Production company: Quiet Village Filmkunst
- Release date: April 2006 (Germany)
- Running time: 89 minutes
- Country: Germany
- Languages: English; German

Cannibal is a 2006 German direct-to-video exploitation horror film written, directed and produced by Marian Dora in his feature film debut. The film centers on a mentally disturbed individual simply known as "The Man", who has cannibalistic fantasies. He makes a deal with a suicidal man known as "The Flesh" who agrees to let The Man eat him.

== Plot ==
In the intro, a mother reads the story of Hansel and Gretel to her young boy. The setting then moves to the present day, where The Man goes about his day-to-day routines and occasionally chats with others on his computer, where he looks for someone who shares his cannibalistic fantasies. The Man meets with several people he had chatted with, but he either rejects them or is rejected (and in one case attacked) by them, except for The Flesh, a suicidal man who volunteers to be killed and eaten by The Man. The Flesh travels to The Man from Berlin, and the two bond, having sex and frolicking in the nude both inside and around The Man's home.

When The Flesh decides that its time for him to die and be devoured, he tries to coerce The Man into biting off his penis, but The Man is unable to go through with it, even when The Flesh uses drugs to knock himself out in an attempt to make things easier. Disappointed, The Flesh chastises The Man. The Flesh decides to give him another chance when The Man begs him to stay just as he is about to board a train back to Berlin. Returning to The Man's home, The Flesh ingests a large amount of alcohol and pills, then instructs The Man to castrate him with a kitchen knife, which The Man succeeds at doing. The two then fry and attempt to eat the severed penis, before The Flesh seemingly dies of blood loss in a bath The Man places The Flesh in.

The Man drags The Flesh's inert body (which vomits and defecates repeatedly) to a room he has readied for slaughter. Before he can begin taking The Flesh apart, The Man is shocked to discover The Flesh is still alive, so he stabs him in the throat. The Man then beheads, guts and dismembers The Flesh, buries the inedible parts, and cooks and eats the rest; he places The Flesh's severed head at the head of the table. The Man then masturbates to snuff film footage of what he has done, and leaves.

== Cast ==
- Carsten Frank as The Man
- Victor Brandl as The Flesh
- Manoush as The Man's Mother
- L. Dora
- Carina Palmer
- Tobias Sickert
- Joachim Sigl
- Bernd Widmann

== Release ==
=== Home media ===
Cannibal was released on DVD in Germany in April 2006 and in the United States by Anthem Pictures on December 19, 2006.

In Germany, the film was confiscated by the district court of Neuburg an der Donau due to Paragraph 184a (Dissemination of pornographic content depicting violent acts) and may no longer be offered for sale.

== Reception ==
Scott Weinberg of DVD Talk rated the film 2/5 stars and wrote, "One of the sickest and freakiest movies ever to come from a nation well-known for its freaky and sick movies (Germany), Cannibal is shocking, outrageous, sickening ... and just a little bit interesting because it's based on actual events." Joshua Siebalt of Dread Central rated it 2/5 stars and wrote, "The only real selling point Cannibal has is its graphic depiction of cannibalism. There are some nasty, nasty moments throughout, but you have to get through a whole lot of nothing before you see them." Sean Leonard from HorrorNews.net praised the film, writing, "This is the first movie in a long time that disturbed me to my core. The entire second half of this movie is non-stop suffering, sadness, dismemberment, and cannibalism. It feels very real, like the viewer is watching from the next room, but also like the viewer is watching something real. The scary thing is, somewhere out there exists video of the actual events."

== See also ==
- Cannibal film
- Cannibalism in Europe
- Cannibalism in popular culture
- Grimm Love
