= Michael G. Barbour =

American botanist and ecologist

Dr. Michael G. Barbour
- Born: February 24, 1942; Michigan, U.S.
- Died: January 7, 2021 (aged 78); California, U.S.
- Scientific career
- Fields: Botany; Ecology; Horticulture
- Workplaces: University of California

Michael G. Barbour (born 1942, died 7 January 2021) was a Californian botanist and ecologist. He was a Professor Emeritus at the University of California, Davis. His fields of expertise were in autecology and synecology of plants and vegetation in stressful environments, including marine strand, tidal salt marsh, vernal pools, warm desert scrub, mixed evergreen forest, oak forest, and montane conifer forest. This research was conducted in Alta and Baja California along the Pacific coast of North America, on the Gulf of Mexico coast, in northwestern Argentina, in southern Australia, in coastal and arid parts of Israel, in mountains of central-to-northern Spain, in mountains of the Canary Islands, and in mountains of Coast Range and Sierra Nevada of California.

== Career ==
Barbour worked at UC Davis from 1967, initially as a faculty member in the Botany Department, then moving to Plant Biology, Environmental Horticulture, and finally Plant Sciences, and retired in 2007.

His teaching and research expertise was in introductory plant biology, plant ecology, forest ecosystems, fire ecology, plant communities of California, and concepts and methods in plant community ecology. He co-authored textbooks in introductory plant biology, plant ecology, and the vegetation of California and North America.

His research was on the vegetation of such habitats as coastal dune, tidal salt marsh, montane conifer forest, vernal pool, Mediterranean-climate woodland, and warm desert scrub. His focus was on determining how vegetation or dominant species tolerate and respond to particular environmental stresses such as salt spray, soil salinity, competition, snow pack, summer drought and heat, freezing temperatures, fog, soil structure, and wildfire.

During his career Barbour was active in numerous organizations: Vice Chair/Chair, Vegetation Section of the Ecological Society of America, 1993-95; Vice Chair/Chair, North American Chapter of International Association for Vegetation Science, 1999-2003; Member/Chair, National Panel on Vegetation Classification, 1995-2009; member of American Institute of Biological Science, Botanical Society of America, British Ecological Society, California Botanical Society, Ecological Society of America, International Association for Vegetation Science, and California Native Plant Society.

== Web Sources ==
- Michael Barbour's Slide Inventory. An extensive collection of slides from Barbour's lifetime of work studying California wildland vegetation.
- UC Davis Emeriti Association Video Interview. Barbour discusses his career at the University of California at Davis, including important persons and events that shaped his interests and scholarship, how he came to the Davis campus and his experiences, relationships and accomplishments as a member of the University and the local community.
- List of Publications. A comprehensive list of Barbour's publications throughout his career.
