= Zombie Nation (film) =

- US DVD released Cover
- Directed by: Ulli Lommel
- Written by: Ulli Lommel
- Produced by: Ulli Lommel; Nola Roeper
- Starring: Brandon Dean; Phil Lander; Karen Maxwell; Naidra Dawn Thomson; Victoria Ullmann
- Cinematography: Jürg V. Walther
- Edited by: Christian Behm
- Music by: Robert J. Walsh
- Release date: March 30, 2005 (Fearless Tales Genre Festival)
- Running time: 81 minutes
- Country: United States
- Language: English
- Budget: $1,500

Zombie Nation is a 2005 American independent horror film written and directed by Ulli Lommel and starring Brandon Dean, Phil Lander, Karen Maxwell, Naidra Dawn Thomson, and Victoria Ullmann.

== Plot ==
Police officer Joe Singer lives a secret night life in which he kidnaps women, and takes them bound to his warehouse loft, injects them with a mysterious liquid, and then murders them. During his day shift as a cop, Joe is angry and vitriolic on the job. He arrests a woman for jay walking and she ends up in the loft. A psychiatrist visits Joe and keeps repeating, "Is it safe?"

A group of Voodoo priestesses perform a ritual that brings several of Joe's victims back to life as zombies. These girls attack and eat random people before they eventually find Joe.

== Reception ==
Reviews of the film have been overwhelmingly negative. Variety called Zombie Nation "a jaw-dropping mess" and "the kind of daft what-were-they-thinking camp exploitation exercise that could prove manna for midnight-slot programmers". The review continued, "By the time serial murder victims rise from their graves looking like Spice Girls knockoffs, it's clear the writer-director's tongue is at least partially in cheek. Fortunately, most of his cast does not appear to have been let in on the joke."
