= Bibliography of the Sierra Nevada =

The following is a bibliography of the Sierra Nevada of California, United States, including books on recreation, natural history, and human history.

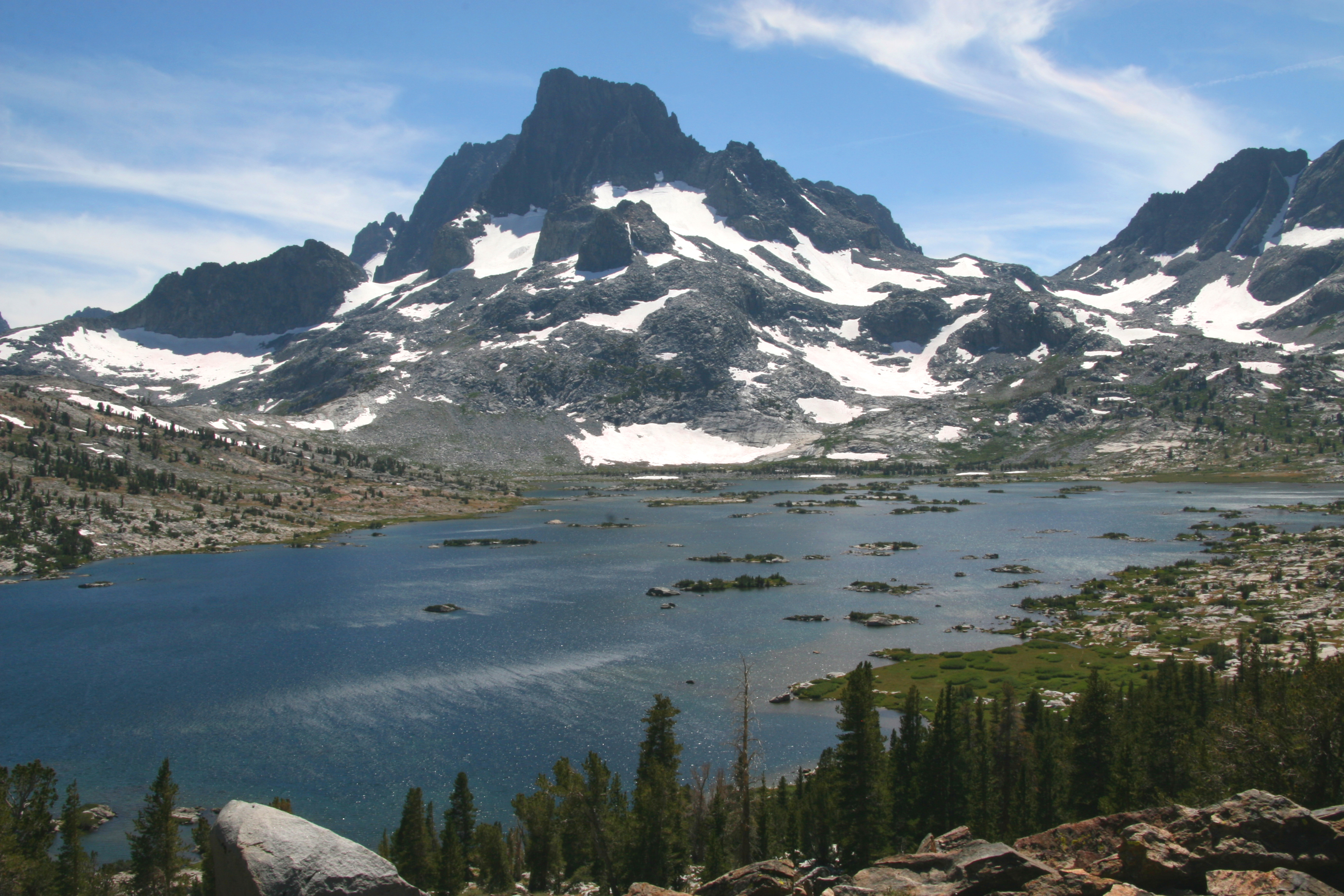
View of Banner Peak and Thousand Island Lake in the Ansel Adams Wilderness

== Recreation ==
=== General travel ===
- Yosemite & The Southern Sierra Nevada: A Complete Guide, Including Sequoia & Kings Canyon, Death Valley & Mammoth Lakes (Great Destinations) (2008), by David T. Page, ISBN 978-1-58157-077-9.
- Sierra Nevada byways : backcountry drives for the whole family (2008), by Tony Huegel, ISBN 978-0-89997-473-6, Wilderness Press.

=== Hiking and climbing ===
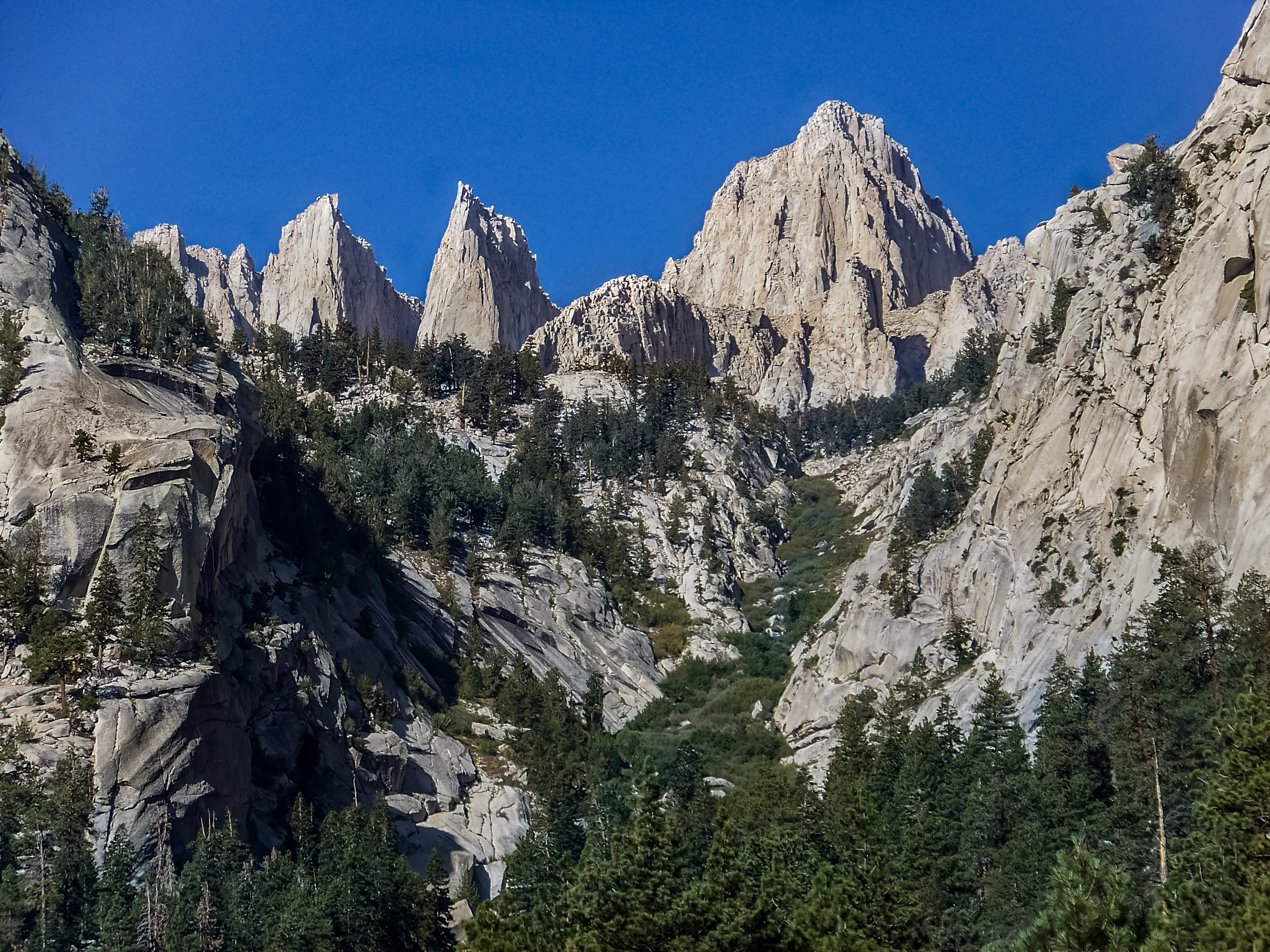
Mount Whitney

- Discovering the John Muir Trail: An Inspirational Guide to America's Most Beautiful Hike (2018) by Damon Corso, ISBN 978-1-49303-125-2.
- Moon Yosemite, Sequoia & Kings Canyon Hiking, Camping, Waterfalls & Big Trees (2015) by Ann Marie Brown, ISBN 978-1-64049-445-9.
- Climbing Mt. Whitney, (2007) by Peter Croft and Wynne Benti, 3rd edition, 42nd printing, ISBN 978-1-893343-14-6, Spotted Dog Press, Bishop, CA.
- John Muir Trail: The Essential Guide to Hiking America's Most Famous Trail (2007), 4th edition, by Elizabeth Wenk with Kathy Morey, ISBN 978-0-89997-436-1.
- Sierra South: Backcountry Trips in California's Sierra Nevada (2006) by Kathy Morey and Mike White, with Stacy Corless, Analise Elliot, Chris Tirrell, and Thomas Winnett, Wilderness Press, ISBN 978-0-89997-414-9.
- Sierra North: Backcountry Trips in California's Sierra Nevada (2005) by Kathy Morey and Mike White, with Stacy Corless and Thomas Winnett, Wilderness Press, 9th edition, ISBN 978-0-89997-396-8.
- Feather River Country Adventure Trails... (2004), by Tom Demund, ISBN 0-9679740-2-X.
- Close Ups of the High Sierra, (2004) by Norman Clyde, 2nd edition, 3rd printing, ISBN 0-9647530-3-0, Spotted Dog Press, Bishop CA.
- Woman on the Rocks: The Mountaineering Letters of Ruth Dyar Mendenhall (2004), 1st edition, ISBN 978-1-893343-15-3, Spotted Dog Press, Bishop, CA.
- 100 Hikes in Yosemite, (2003) by Marc J. Soares, Mountaineers Books, ISBN 0-89886-867-X.
- Starr's Guide to the John Muir Trail and the High Sierra Region (2002) 12th rev. ed., by Walter A. Starr, Jr. ISBN 0-87156-172-7.
- The Good, the Great, and the Awesome: The Top 40 High Sierra Rock Climbs (2002), by Peter Croft, ISBN 0-9676116-4-4.
- Hiking in the Sierra Nevada, (2002) by John Mock and Kimberley O'Neil, ISBN 1-74059-272-7, A Lonely Planet guidebook.
- Yuba trails 2: A selection of historic hiking trails in the Yuba River and neighboring watersheds (2001), by Hank Meals, ASIN B0006RSO5U.
- The High Sierra: Peaks, Passes, and Trails (1999), by R. J. Secor, ISBN 0-89886-625-1.
- The Tahoe Sierra: A Natural History Guide to 112 Hikes in the Northern Sierra (1998), by Jeffrey Schaffer, Wilderness Press, ISBN 0-89997-220-9.
- The Secret Sierra: The Alpine World Above the Trees (1998), by David Gilligan, 1st edition, ISBN 1-893343-01-4, Spotted Dog Press, Bishop CA.
- Climbing California's Fourteeners: The Route Guide to the Fifteen Highest Peaks (1998) by Stephen Porcella and Cameron Burns, ISBN 0-89886-555-7.
- Sierra High Route: Traversing Timberline Country (1997), by Steve Roper, ISBN 0-89886-506-9.
- Sierra Classics : 100 Best Climbs in the High Sierra (1993), by John Moynier and Claude Fiddler, ISBN 0-934641-60-9.
- The Tahoe-Yosemite Trail: A Comprehensive Guide... (1987), by Thomas Winnett, Wilderness Press, ISBN 0-89997-084-2.
- Yosemite Climbs (1987), by George Meyers and Don Reid, ISBN 0-934641-05-6.
- The Vertical World of Yosemite (1973), by Royal Robbins, ISBN 0-911824-87-1.

=== Skiing ===
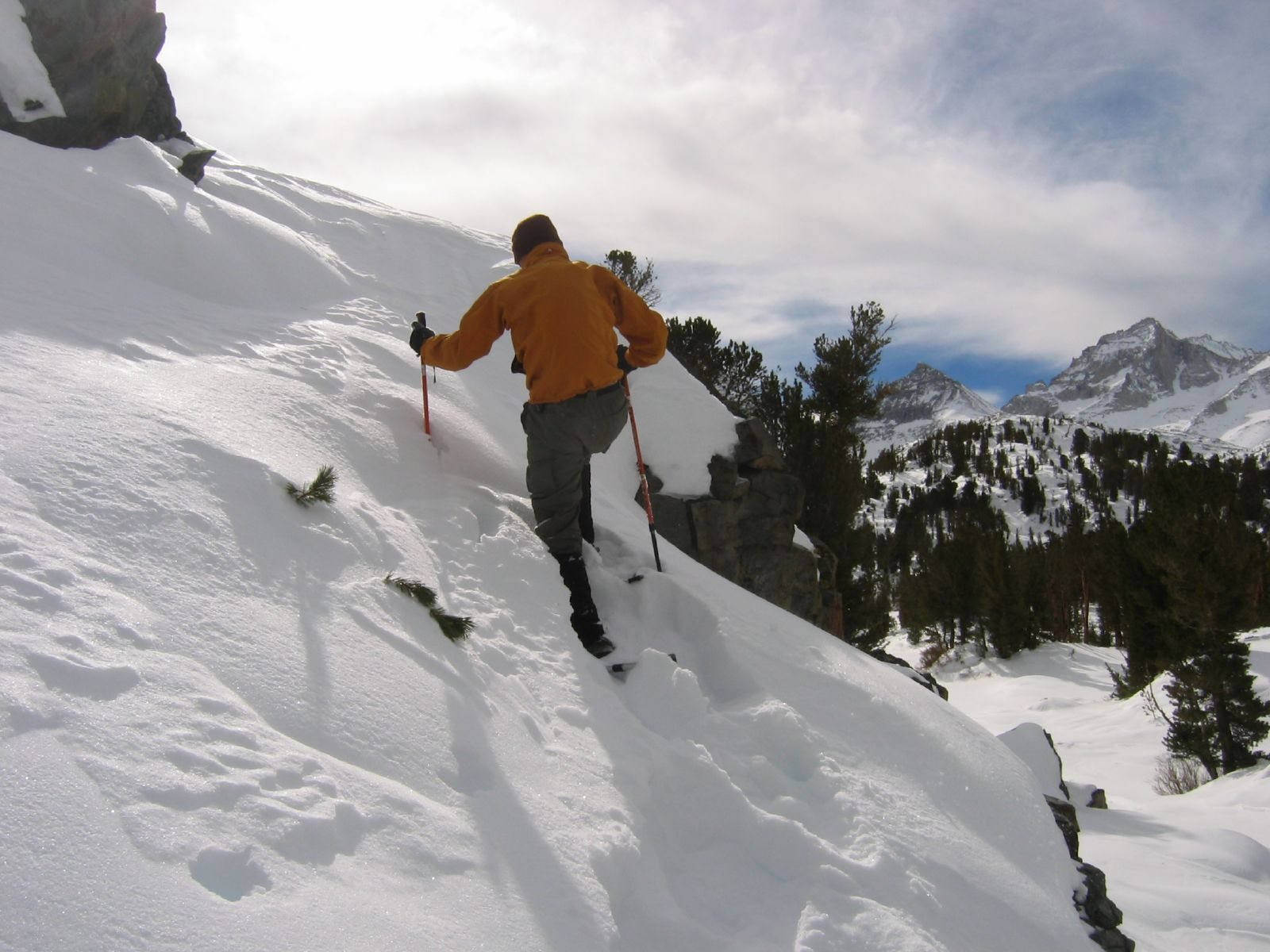
Skier climbing Mount Morgan

- Backcountry Skiing California's High Sierra (1999), by John Moynier, ISBN 1-56044-913-6.
- Ski Tours in the Sierra Nevada: East of the Sierra (1986), by Marcus Libkind, ISBN 0-931255-03-1.
- Ski Tours in the Sierra Nevada: Lake Tahoe (1985), by Marcus Libkind, ISBN 0-931255-00-7.
- Ski Tours in the Sierra Nevada: Yosemite, Huntington and Shaver Lakes, Kings Canyon and Sequoia (1985), by Marcus Libkind, ISBN 0-931255-02-3.

=== River rafting ===
- The Best Whitewater in California (1998), by Lars Holbek and Chuck Stanley, ISBN 0-9665289-0-5.
- California Whitewater: A Guide to the Rivers (1995), by Jim Cassady and Fryar Calhoun, ISBN 0-9613650-2-1.

== Natural history ==
=== Multi-subject ===
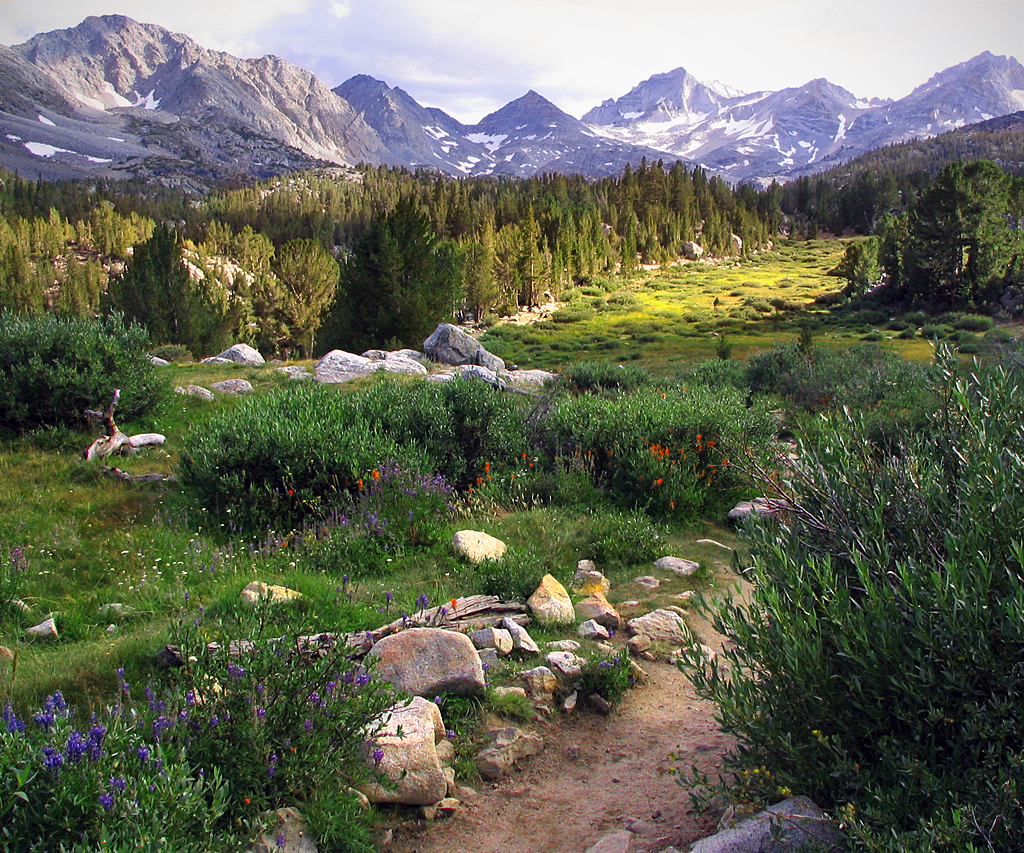
Little Lakes Valley

- The California Naturalist Handbook (2013), by Greg de Nevers, Deborah Stanger Edelman, Adina Merenlender, ISBN 978-0-520-27480-8.
- The Laws Field Guide to the Sierra Nevada (2007), by John Muir Laws, ISBN 978-1-59714-052-2.
- Sierra Nevada Natural History (2004) by Tracy Storer, Robert Usinger, David Lukas ISBN 0-520-24096-0.
- Wild Northern California (2001) by Ron Adkinson, ISBN 1-56044-781-8.
- Sierra East: Edge of the Great Basin (2000) by Genny Smith, Diana Tomback, Ann Howald, ISBN 0-520-23914-8.
- Sierra Nevada: The Naturalist's Companion (2000), by Verna Johnston, ISBN 0-520-22488-4.
- Yosemite National Park: A Natural History Guide to Yosemite and its Trails (2000) by Jeffrey Schaffer, ISBN 0-89997-244-6.
- Sierra Nevada Ecosystem Project (1996), California Resources Agency.
- Land Above The Trees (1996), by Ann H. Zwinger and Beatrice E. Willard, ISBN 1-55566-171-8.
- A Natural History of California (1995), Allan A. Schoenherr, ISBN 0-520-06922-6.
- Deepest Valley: Guide to Owens Valley, its Roadsides and Mountain Trails (1995) by Jeff Putnam, Greg James, Mary DeDecker, Jo Heindel, Genny Smith, ISBN 0-931378-14-1.
- Yosemite: A Visitor's Companion (1994), by George Wuerthner, ISBN 978-0811725989.
- California Forests and Woodlands: A Natural History (1994), by Verna R Johnston, ISBN 0-520-08324-5.
- Mammoth Lakes Sierra: A Handbook for Roadside and Trail (1993) by Dean Rinehart, Elden Vestal, Bettie E. Willard, ISBN 0-931378-13-3.
- California's Eastern Sierra: A Visitor's Guide (1992), Sue Irwin, ISBN 0-9628505-0-0.
- Sierra Club Naturalist's Guide: The Sierra Nevada (1982), by Stephen Whitney, ISBN 0-87156-215-4.
- The Yosemite (1912) by John Muir, ISBN 0-87156-782-2.
- The Mountains of California (1894), by John Muir.

=== Flora/Vegetation ===
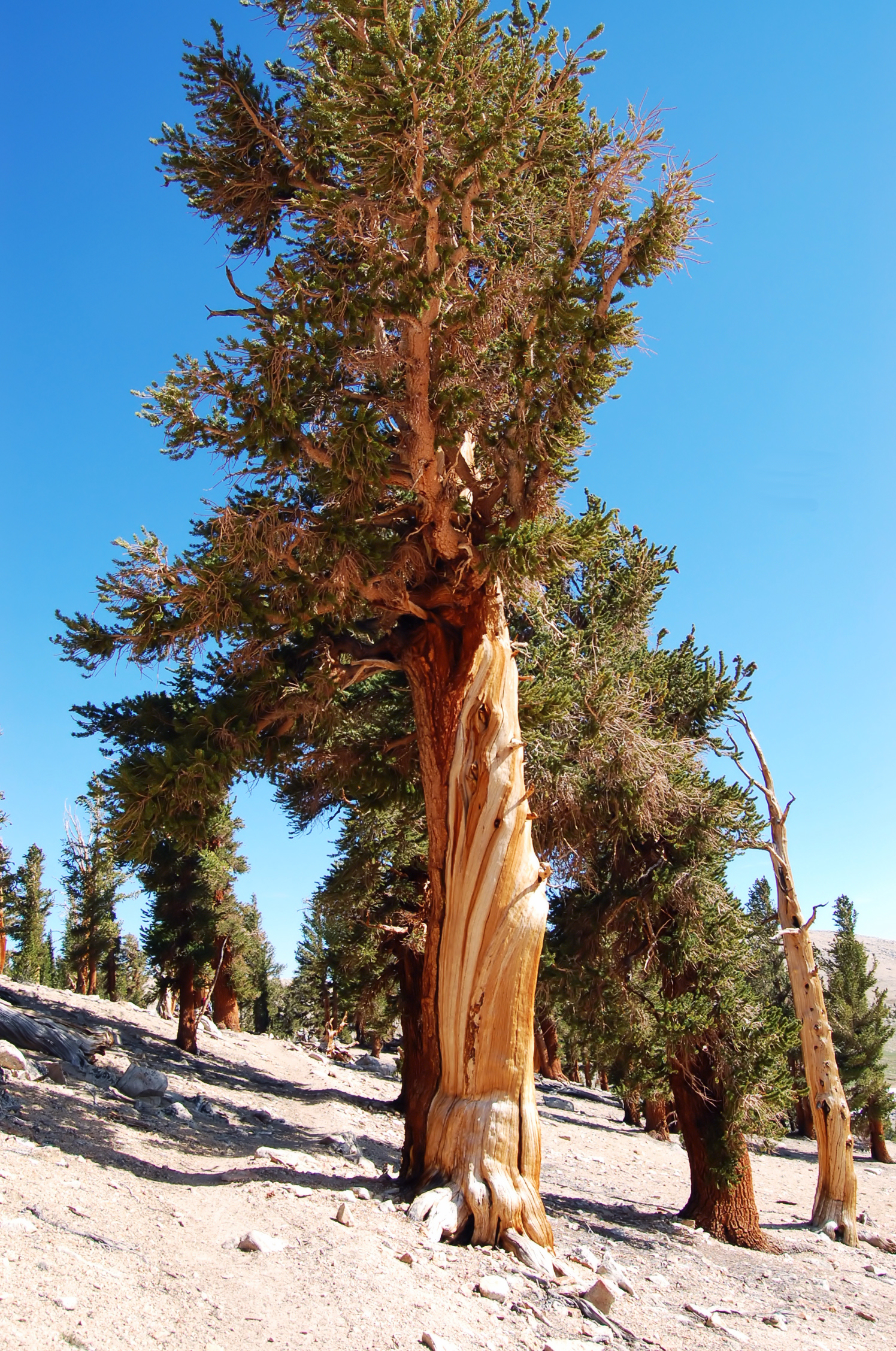
A foxtail pine in Sequoia National Park

- Terrestrial vegetation of California (2007) by M.G. Barbour, T. Keeler-Wolf, A.A. Schoenherr (eds.), ISBN 0-520-24955-0.
- Introduction to California Plant Life, Revised Edition (2003), by Robert Ornduff, Phyllis Faber, Todd Keeler-Wolf, ISBN 0-520-23704-8.
- Wildflowers of the Eastern Sierra and adjoining Mojave Desert and Great Basin (2002), by Laird R. Blackwell, ISBN 978-1-55105-281-6.
- Fire in Sierra Nevada Forests: A Photographic Interpretation of Ecological Change Since 1849 (2001), by George E. Gruell, ISBN 0-87842-446-6.
- Conifers of California (1999), by Ronald M. Lanner, ISBN 0-9628505-3-5.
- Wildflowers of the Sierra Nevada and the Central Valley (1998), by Laird R. Blackwell, ISBN 1-55105-226-1.
- Sierra Nevada Wildflowers (1998), by Elizabeth L. Horn, ISBN 0-87842-388-5.
- California Forests and Woodlands: A Natural History (1996), by Verna R. Johnston, Carla J. Simmons (Illustrator), ISBN 0-520-20248-1.
- A Sierra Nevada Flora (1996), by Norman L Weeden and Amy David, ISBN 0-89997-204-7.
- Manual of California Vegetation (1995), by Todd Keeler-Wolf and John Sawyer, ISBN 0-943460-26-3.
- The Jepson Manual: Higher Plants of California (1993) by James C Hickman, ISBN 0-520-08255-9.
- Oaks of California (1990), by Bruce M. Pavlik, Sharon Johnson, Pamela Muick, Marjorie Popper, ISBN 0-9628505-1-9.
- Lingering in Tahoe's Wild Gardens: A Guide to Hundreds of the Most Beautiful Wildflower Gardens of the Tahoe Region (1989), by Julie Carville, ISBN 0-9622378-6-8.
- Illustrated Manual of California Shrubs (1980), by Howard E McMinn, ISBN 0-520-00847-2.
- Native Trees of the Sierra Nevada (1975), by P. Victor Peterson, ISBN 0-520-02736-1.
- Grasses in California (1974), by Beecher Crampton, ISBN 0-520-02507-5.
- Native Shrubs of the Sierra Nevada (1974), by John H Thomas, ISBN 0-520-02738-8.
- Discovering Sierra Trees (1973), by Steven Arno, ISBN 0-939666-04-9.

=== Fauna ===
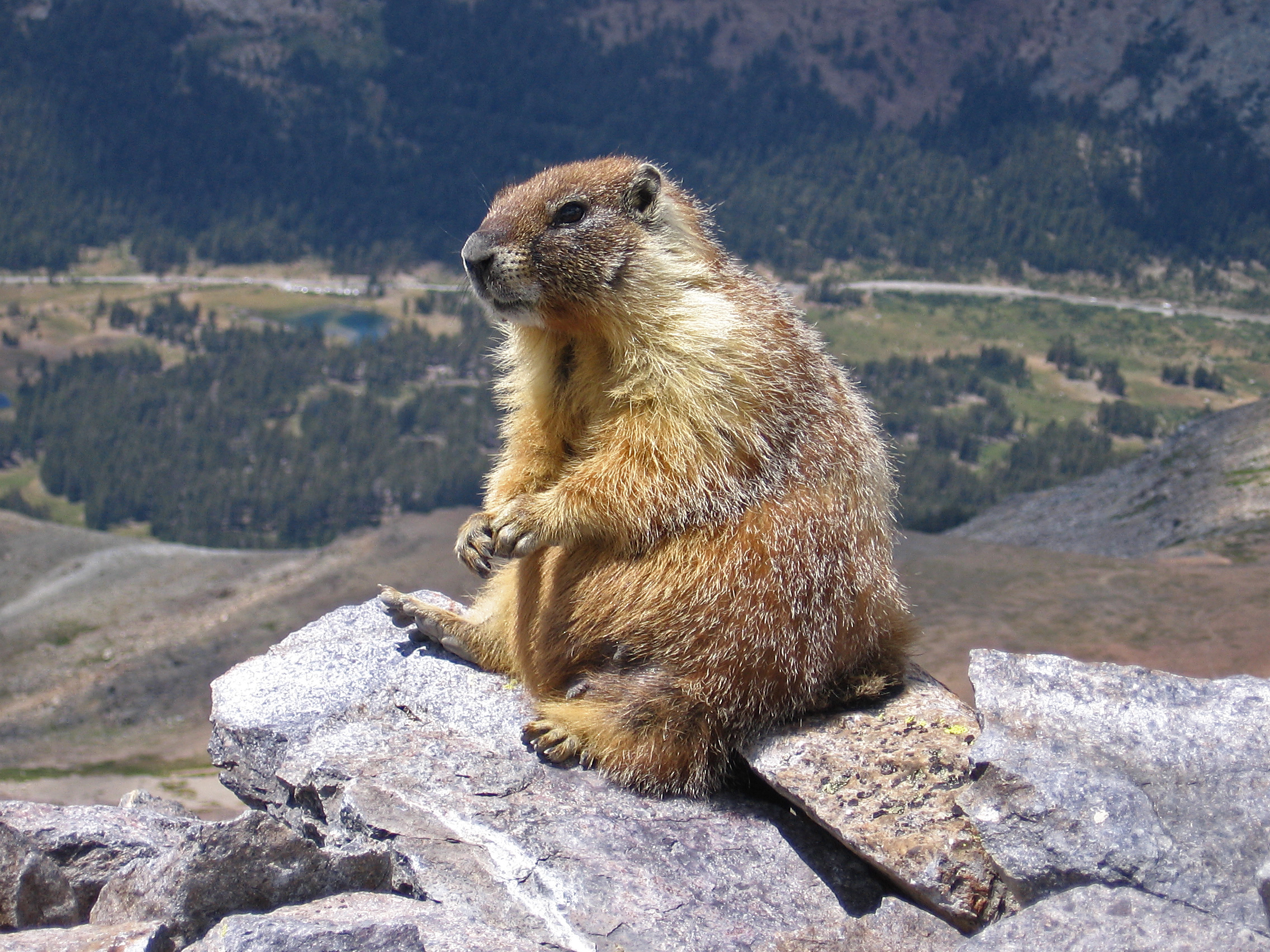
A yellow-bellied marmot on top of Mount Dana

- Birds of the Sierra Nevada (2013), by Edward R. Pandolfino and Edward C. Beedy, ISBN 0-520-27493-8, University of California Press.
- Mammals of California (California Natural History Guides) (2004), by E. W. Jameson. Jr and Hans J. Peeters, ISBN 0-520-23582-7, University of California Press.
- Sierra Birds: A Hiker's Guide (2004), by John Muir Laws, ISBN 1-890771-78-3, Heyday Books.
- Birds of Yosemite and the East Slope (1992.), by David Gaines, ASIN B0006P3Q46, Artemisia Press.
- Discovering Sierra Reptiles and Amphibians (Discovering Sierra Series) (1991), by Harold Basey, ISBN 0-939666-03-0, Yosemite Association.
- Discovering Sierra Birds (1985.), by Ted Beedy, ISBN 0-939666-42-1, Yosemite Association.
- Birds of Yosemite National Park (1963), by Cyril A. Stebbins and Robert C. Stebbins.
- Mammals of Yosemite (1952), by Harry Parker.
- Reptiles and Amphibians of Yosemite National Park (1946), by M. V. Walker.
- Animal Life in the Yosemite (1924), by Joseph Grinnell and Tracy Storer. Classic work on the fauna of a cross section of the Sierra Nevada, available as an online book.

=== Geology ===
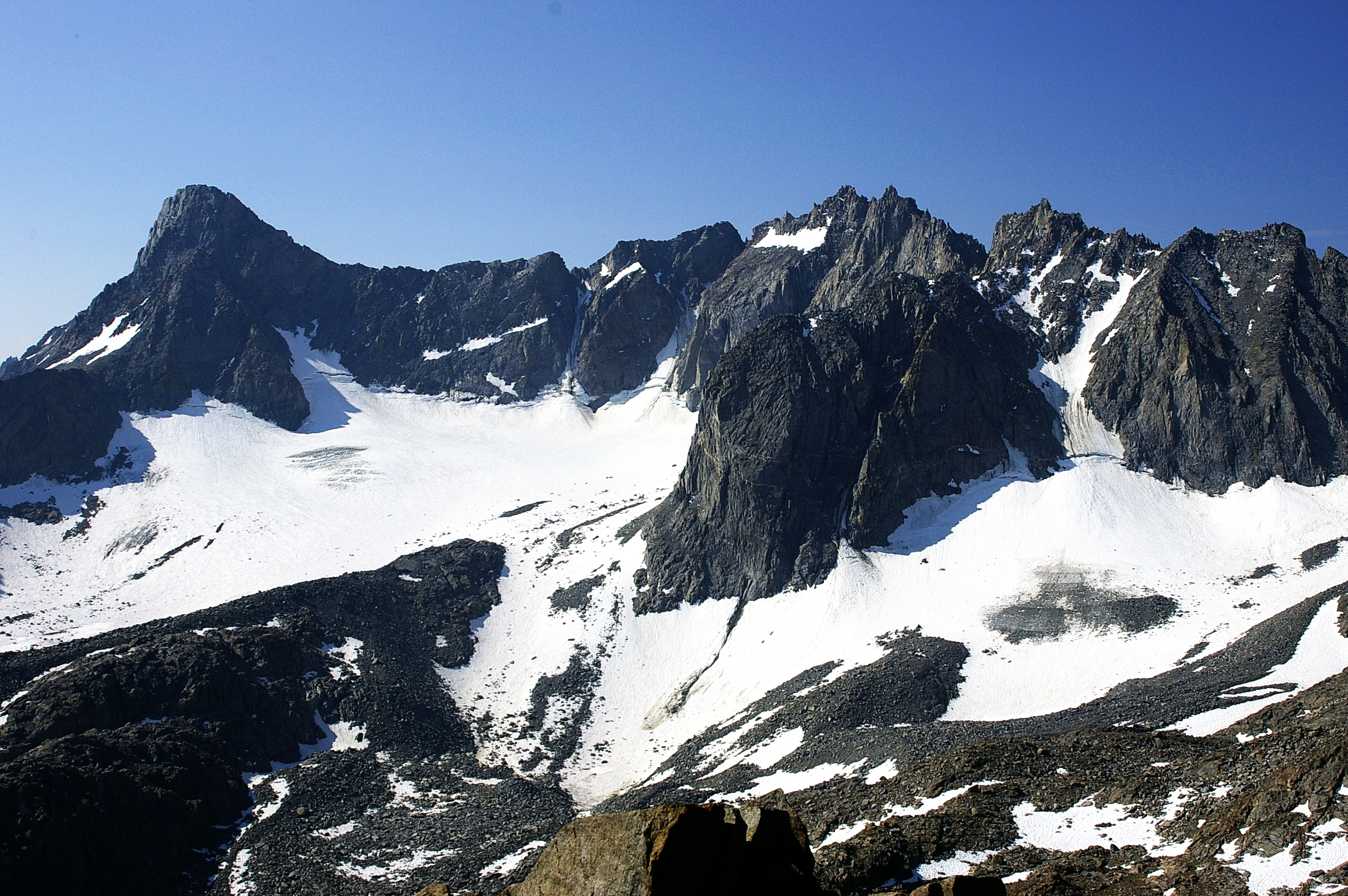
Palisade Glacier

- Geology of the Sierra Nevada (2005), by Mary Hill, ISBN 0-520-23696-3. (Natural history guide for a general audience.)
- California Geology (2003), by Deborah Harden, ISBN 0-13-100218-X. (A lower division textbook for non-geology majors, with sufficient introductory material for a general audience.)
- Geology Underfoot in Southern California (2003), by Robert P. Sharp, Allen F. Glazner, ISBN 0-87842-289-7. (Roadguide with explanations of the geology written for a general audience.)
- Glaciers of California: Modern Glaciers, Ice Age Glaciers, the Origin of Yosemite Valley, and a Glacier Tour in the Sierra Nevada (2001), by Bill Guyton, ISBN 0-520-22683-6. (A general introduction to glaciers and the California glaciers.)
- Roadside Geology of Northern and Central California (2000), by David Alt, Donald Hyndman, ISBN 0-87842-409-1. (Roadguide with explanations of the geology written for a general audience.)
- California Rivers and Streams (1995), by Jeffrey R. Mount, ISBN 0-520-20250-3. (Natural history/geology, not a river running guide.)
- Assembling California (1994), by John A. McPhee, ISBN 0-374-52393-2. (Part of the Pulitzer Prize winning series about geology across America, Annals of the Former World, 1999.)
- The Geologic Story of Yosemite National Park (1987), by Dr. N. King Huber. (Authoritative book on Yosemite geology written by a USGS geologist.)
- Earthquakes and Young Volcanoes along the Eastern Sierra Nevada: At Mammoth Lakes 1980, Lone Pine 1872, and Inyo and Mono Craters (1982), ISBN 0-931378-02-8.
- The Incomparable Valley: A Geologic Interpretation of the Yosemite (1950), by François E. Matthes.
- Geologic history of the Yosemite Valley: U.S. Geological Survey Professional Paper 160 (1930), by François E. Matthes.
- Geology of the Sierra Nevada, or California Range (1853), Professor John B. Trask's March 1853 report to the [California] State Assembly: 36 pages

== History ==
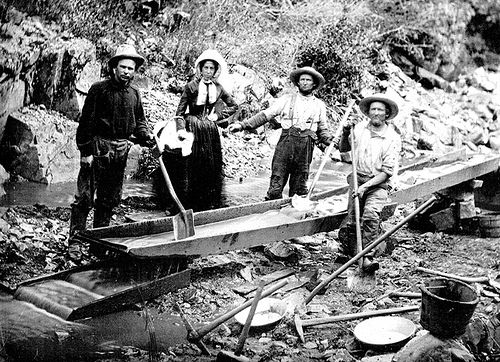
Panning for gold, 1850

- Savage Dreams: a Journey into the Hidden Wars of the American West (2014) by Rebecca Solnit, ISBN 978-0-520-95792-3.
- Lake Tahoe's West Shore (2012) by Carol A. Jensen, ISBN 0-73858-891-1.
- Rosalie Edge, Hawk of Mercy: The Activist Who Saved Nature from the Conservationists (2009) by Dyana Z. Furmansky, ISBN 978-0-820-33676-3.
- The age of gold: the California Gold Rush and the new American dream (2008) by H.W. Brands, ISBN 0-30748-122-0.
- Owens Valley Revisited: A Reassessment of the West's First Great Water Transfer (2007) by Gary Libecap, ISBN 978-0-8047-5379-1.
- Crow's Range: An Environmental History Of The Sierra Nevada (2004), by David Beesley, ISBN 0-87417-562-3.
- The Mule Men: A History of Stock Packing in the Sierra Nevada (2004) by Louise Jackson, ISBN 0-87842-499-7.
- Shaping the Sierra: Nature, Culture, and Conflict in the Changing West (2000.), by Timothy P. Duane, ISBN 0-520-22676-3.
- Rush for riches; gold fever and the making of California (1999), by J.S. Holliday, ISBN 978-0520214026.
- A Golden State: mining and economic development in Gold Rush California (1999), Rawls, James J.; Orsi, Richard J., eds., ISBN 0-520-21771-3.
- Camp 4: Recollections of a Yosemite Rockclimber (1998), by Steve Roper, ISBN 0-89886-587-5.
- Old Mammoth: A First Hand Account (1994) by Adele Reed, ISBN 0-931378-04-4.
- Mammoth Gold: The Ghost Towns of Lake District (1990) by Gary Caldwell ISBN 0-931378-12-5.
- Solomons of the Sierra: The Pioneer of the John Muir Trail, (1990) by Shirley Sargent and Peter Browning, ISBN 1-878345-21-4.
- Yosemite: The Embattled Wilderness (1990) by Alfred Runte, ISBN 0-8032-3894-0.
- Beulah: A Biography of the Mineral King Valley of California (1988) by Louise A. Jackson, ISBN 0-87026-065-0.
- Lost Cement Mine (1984) by James W.A. Wright ISBN 0-931378-09-5.
- Owens Valley Groundwater Conflict (1978) by Genny Smith ISBN 0-931378-03-6.
- History of the Sierra Nevada (1965) by Francis Farquhar ISBN 0-520-01551-7.

=== Place names ===
- California Place Names: The origin and etymology of current geographical names (2004), by Gudde Erwin and William Bright, ISBN 0-520-26619-6.
- Place Names of the Sierra Nevada: From Abbot to Zumwalt (1991), by Peter Browning, ISBN 0-89997-119-9.
- Place Names of the High Sierra (1926), by Francis P. Farquhar.

=== Explorations ===
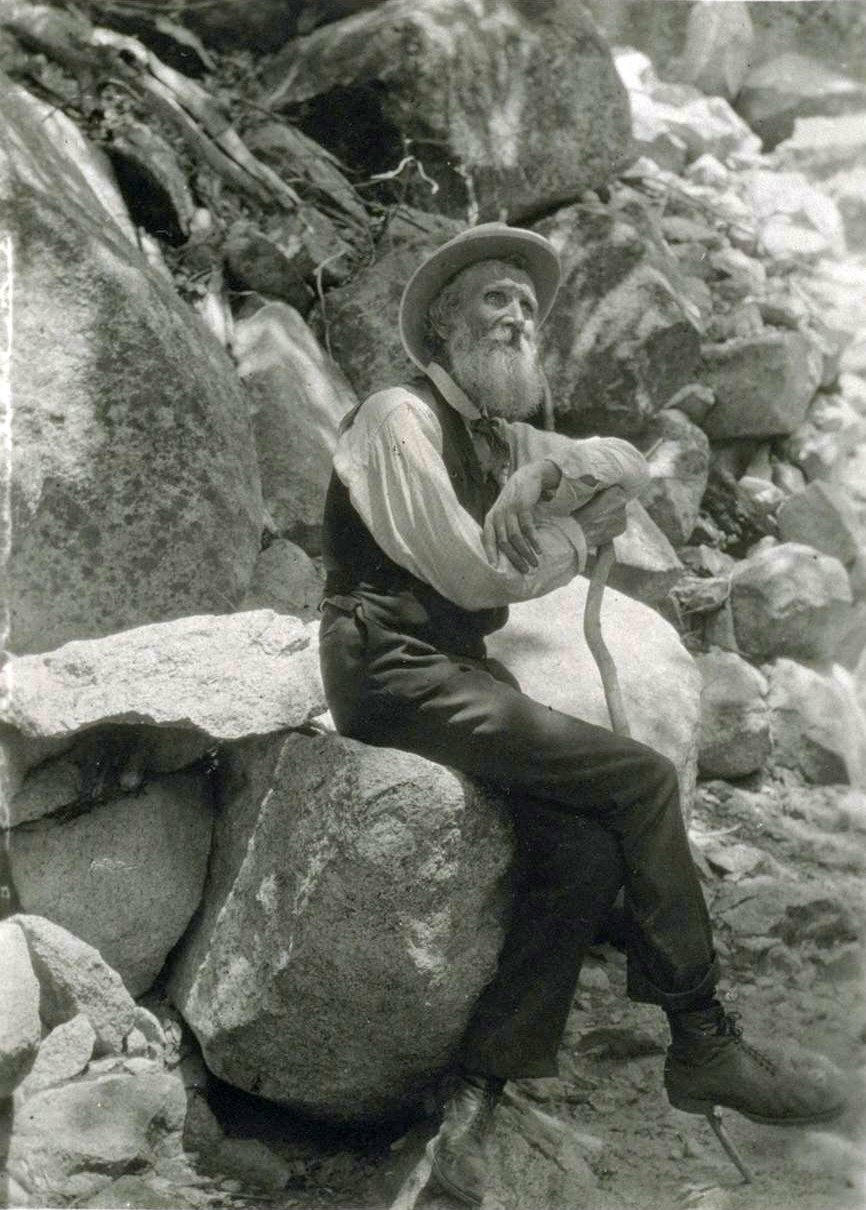
John Muir, 1907

- The High Sierra: A Love Story (2022), Kim Stanley Robinson, Little Brown and Company, ISBN 978-0-316-59301-4.
- Spirit in the Desert: Pilgrimages to Sacred Sites in the Owens Valley (2009), Brad Karelius, BookSurge Publishing, ISBN 1-4392-1721-1, 0-520-07245-6.
- Jesus, History and Mt. Darwin: An Academic Excursion (2008) by Rick Kennedy. ISBN 978-0-7188-9189-3.
- Exploring the Highest Sierra (2000), James G. Moore, Stanford University Press, ISBN 0-8047-3703-7.
- Close Ups of the High Sierra (1998), by Norman Clyde, ISBN 0-9647530-3-0.
- High Sierra: John Muir's Range of Light (1996), by Phil Arnot, ISBN 1-884550-06-1.
- The Sierra Nevada: A Mountain Journey (1988), by Tim Palmer, ISBN 0-933280-53-X.
- A journal of ramblings through the High Sierra of California by the University excursion party (1960), by Joseph LeConte, Library of Congress F868.S5 L39 1960.
- Up and Down California in 1860–1864 (1930), by William H. Brewer, ISBN 0-520-02762-0.
- My First Summer in the Sierra (1911) by John Muir ISBN 0-14-025570-2.
- Discovery of the Yosemite (1892) by Lafayette H. Bunnell, ISBN 0-939666-58-8.
- Mountaineering in the Sierra Nevada (1872) by Clarence King. ISBN 0-8032-7783-0.

=== Biographies ===
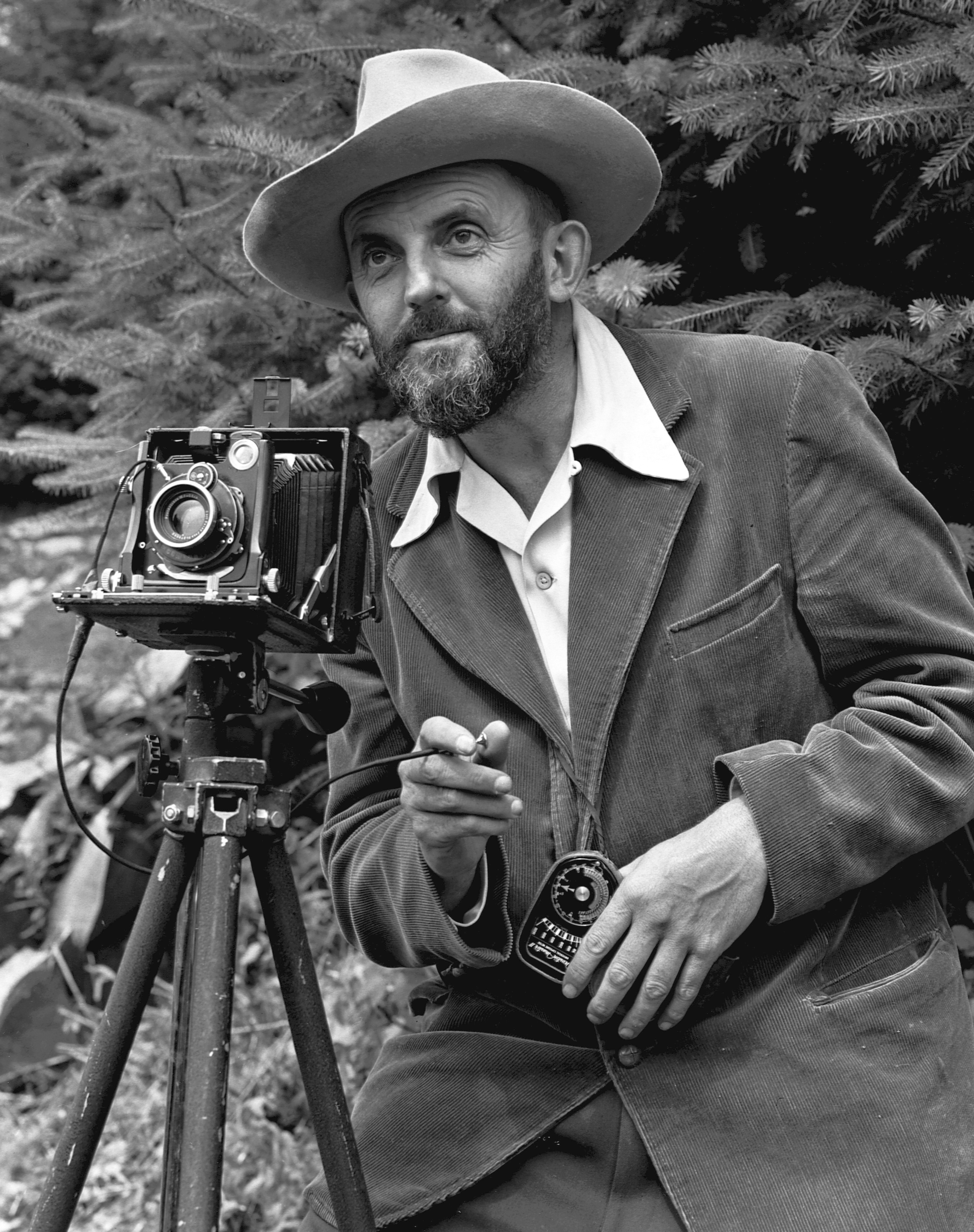
Ansel Adams, c. 1950

- Blood and Thunder (2006) by Hampton Sides, ISBN 978-0-307-38767-7. (Kit Carson)
- John Sutter and a Wider West (2002) by Kenneth N Owens and John A Sutter, ISBN 0-8032-8618-X.
- The Young John Muir: An Environmental Biography (1999) by Steven Holmes, ISBN 978-0-299-16154-5.
- Ansel Adams and the American landscape: a biography (1998) by Jonathan Spaulding, ISBN 978-0-520-21663-1.
- Rivers in the Desert: William Mulholland and the Inventing of Los Angeles (1993) by Margaret L. Davis, ISBN 978-0-060-16698-4.
- Frémont, Pathmarker of the West (1939) by Allan Nevins (Vol 1, Vol 2), ISBN 978-0-803-28364-0.

=== Indigenous people ===
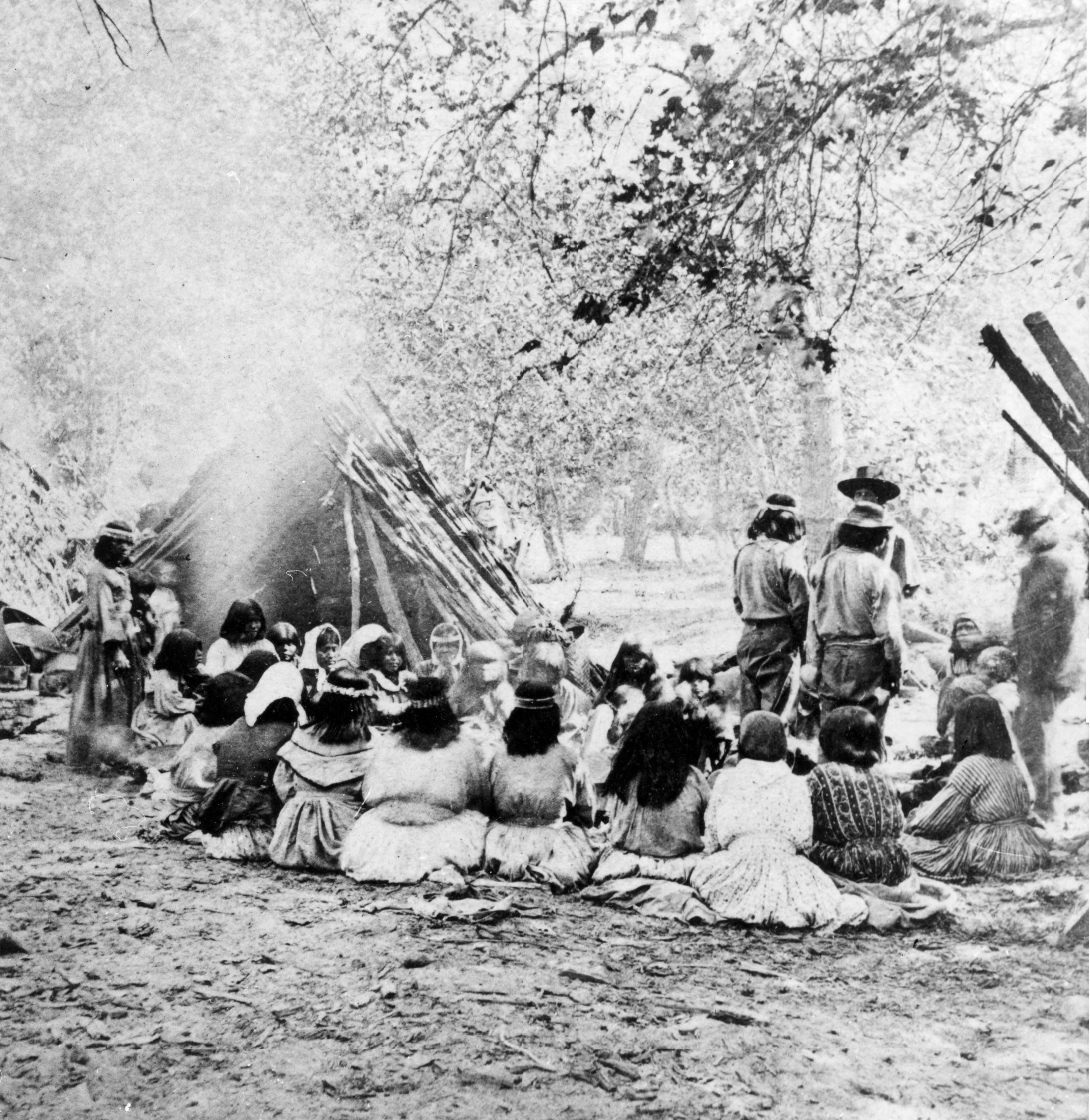
Southern Miwok council by Eadweard Muybridge, 1872

- History of Us: Nisenan Tribe of the Nevada City Rancheria (2018) by Richard Johnson, ISBN 978-0-933-99465-2.
- Defying the Odds: The Tule River Tribe's Struggle for Sovereignty in Three Centuries (2010) by Gelya Frank and Carole Goldberg, ISBN 978-0-300-16286-8.
- Archaeology and Rock Art of the Eastern Sierra and Great Basin Frontier (2007) by AP Garfinkel, ISBN 978-0-943-04116-2.
- A Native American Encyclopedia: History, Culture, and Peoples (2000) by Barry M Pritzker, ISBN 978-0-195-13877-1.
- Handbook of Yokuts Indians (1999) by Frank F. Latta, ISBN 1-892622-09-2.
- The Natural World of the California Indians (1980) by RF Heizer and AB Elsasser, ISBN 0-520-03895-9.
- The Northern Maidu (1977) by Marie Potts, ISBN 0-879610-71-9.
- Miwok Material Culture: Indian Life of the Yosemite Region (1933) by SA Barrett and EW Gifford, ISBN 0-939666-12-X.
