= Walking Brooklyn =

2007 book by Adrienne Onofri

Walking Brooklyn: 30 Tours Exploring Historical Legacies, Neighborhood Culture, Side Streets, and Waterways
- Author: Adrienne Onofri
- Language: English
- Genre: Travel
- Publisher: Wilderness Press
- Publication date: June 2007
- Publication place: United States
- Media type: Print (Paperback)
- Pages: 246 pp
- ISBN: 978-0-89997-430-9
- OCLC: 148767852

Walking Brooklyn: 30 Tours Exploring Historical Legacies, Neighborhood Culture, Side Streets, and Waterways is a book by Adrienne Onofri. It was published in June 2007 by Wilderness Press as one of the first titles in their urban trekking series.

Walking Brooklyn consists of 30 chapters, each providing a walking tour of a Brooklyn area. As described by the Brooklyn Daily Eagle: "Each walk begins with a map of the area with the appropriate route highlighted, a summary of boundaries, approximate distance of the route and the closest subway stop to begin at, followed by a brief historical introduction to the area. The actual street-by-street (sometimes step-by-step) route guide is then provided in bullet form. The walks are each concluded with a summary of the points of interests described as well as a MapQuest-like route summary."

The New York Times wrote: "A book about Brooklyn published by the Wilderness Press? Turns out it’s a wonderful idea. ...a charming, practical and informative guide to seeing the familiar and undiscovered features of the borough on foot." The Daily News said the book "tells you what’s worth seeing or sampling in each neighborhood and how best to navigate it and where to eat while uncovering historical and cultural nuggets many natives never knew."

== See also ==
- List of Brooklyn neighborhoods
- Big Onion Walking Tours
