= Self-guided tour =

Tourist concept

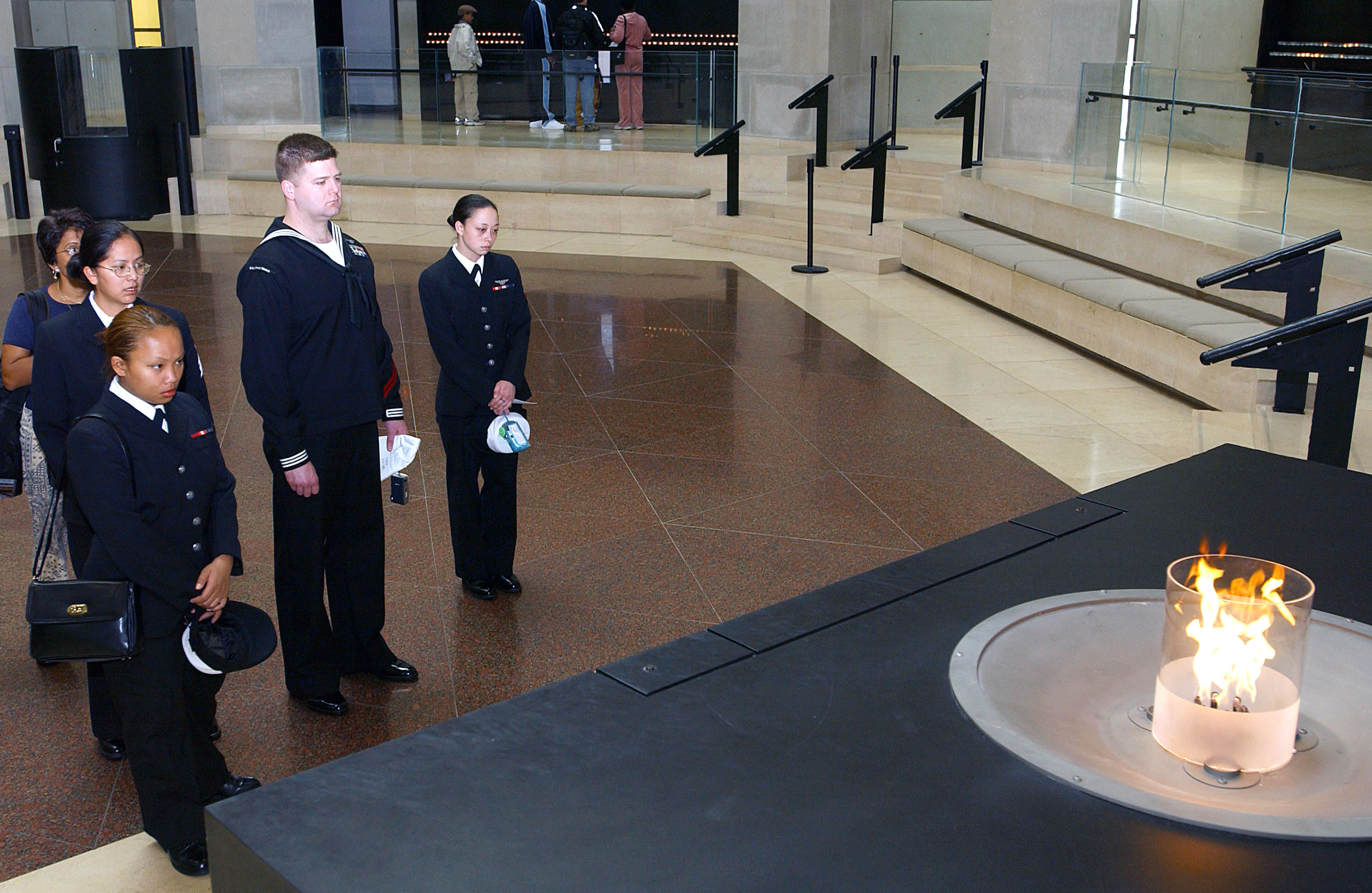
United States Holocaust Memorial Museum. Taking a moment to reflect at the eternal flame in the Hall of Remembrance after a self-guided tour of the museum's exhibits.

A self-guided tour is a tour in which the participant is not escorted by a guide. As with escorted tours, self-guided tours may be conducted on foot or by vehicle. Audio tours are frequently presented in a self-guided format using booklets, smart phones or standalone handheld devices, as are virtual tours.

== See also ==
- Cell phone tour
- GPS tour
- Guide book
- Walking tour
