= Escorted tour =

Form of tourism

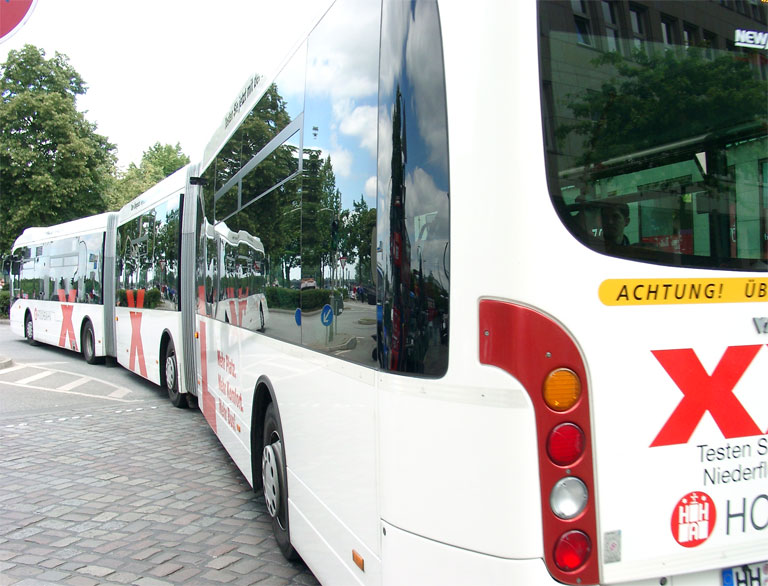
Large motor coach with tourists

An escorted tour is a form of tourism in which travelers are escorted in a group to various destinations; they differ from a self-guided tour, where the tourist is not part of an organised group.

Escorted tours are normally conducted by a tour director who takes care of all services from the beginning to the end of the tour. Escorted tours normally include accommodation, transport, meals and some sightseeing. Escorted tours are often conducted by motor coach.

== See also ==
- Package tour
- Tour bus service
- Walking tour
