= Walking tour =

Tourism activity

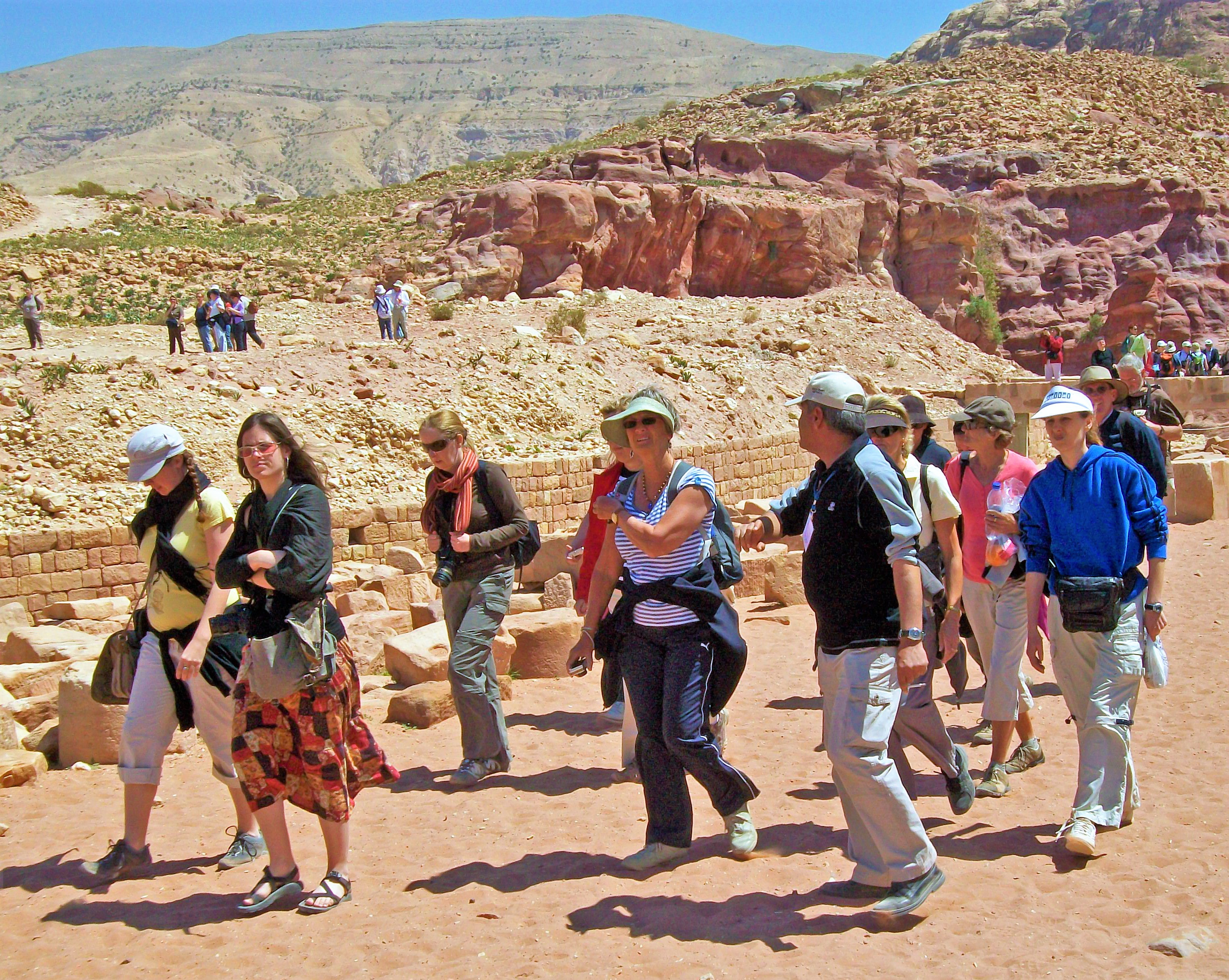
Tourists on a walking tour of the lower canyon at Petra, Jordan

A walking tour usually refers to either:

1. a guided walk around a historical or cultural site, usually in an urban setting, or
2. a long walk over several days in the countryside, also called backpacking.

== History ==
An early example of a walking tour was a pilgrimage. This was a religious journey, often taken on foot but sometimes e.g. on horseback, to a location of significance to the walker's faith. Chaucer's 14th-century narrative poem Canterbury Tales depicts such a pilgrimage. People still undertake such journeys, of which the most famous is the Camino de Santiago. Many pilgrimage routes now coincide with long-distance trails. Such trails are a recent form of a walking tour or backpacking. One example is the French GR 65 path, Chemin de Saint-Jacques (in Spanish the Camino de Santiago francés), an important variant route of the pilgrimage to Santiago de Compostela.

Early examples of extended walking tours were undertaken by the Romantic poets, William Wordsworth and John Keats. In 1790 Wordsworth set off on an extended tour of France, Switzerland, and Germany, which he describes in his autobiographical poem The Prelude (1850). In 1798 he walked through Wales and he and Coleridge, in 1799, undertook a three-week tour of the Lake District. John Keats, who belonged to the next generation of Romantic poets began, in June 1818, a walking tour of Scotland, Ireland, and the Lake District with his friend Charles Armitage Brown. Walking tours were popular in the 19th century, and a famous example is Robert Louis Stevenson's Travels with a Donkey (1879). Stevenson also published in 1876 the famous essay "Walking Tours". An early American example is naturalist John Muir's A Thousand Mile Walk to the Gulf (1916), which describes a long botanizing walk, undertaken in 1867. Another early type of tour was The Grand Tour, undertaken in Europe in the 17th through 19th centuries, as part of a wealthy young man's education, this involved a lengthy tour of Europe, with visits to cities, historic and cultural sites, which would involve similar walking tours as those undertaken by modern tourists. Modern young people often undertake a similar, though cheaper, form of touring.

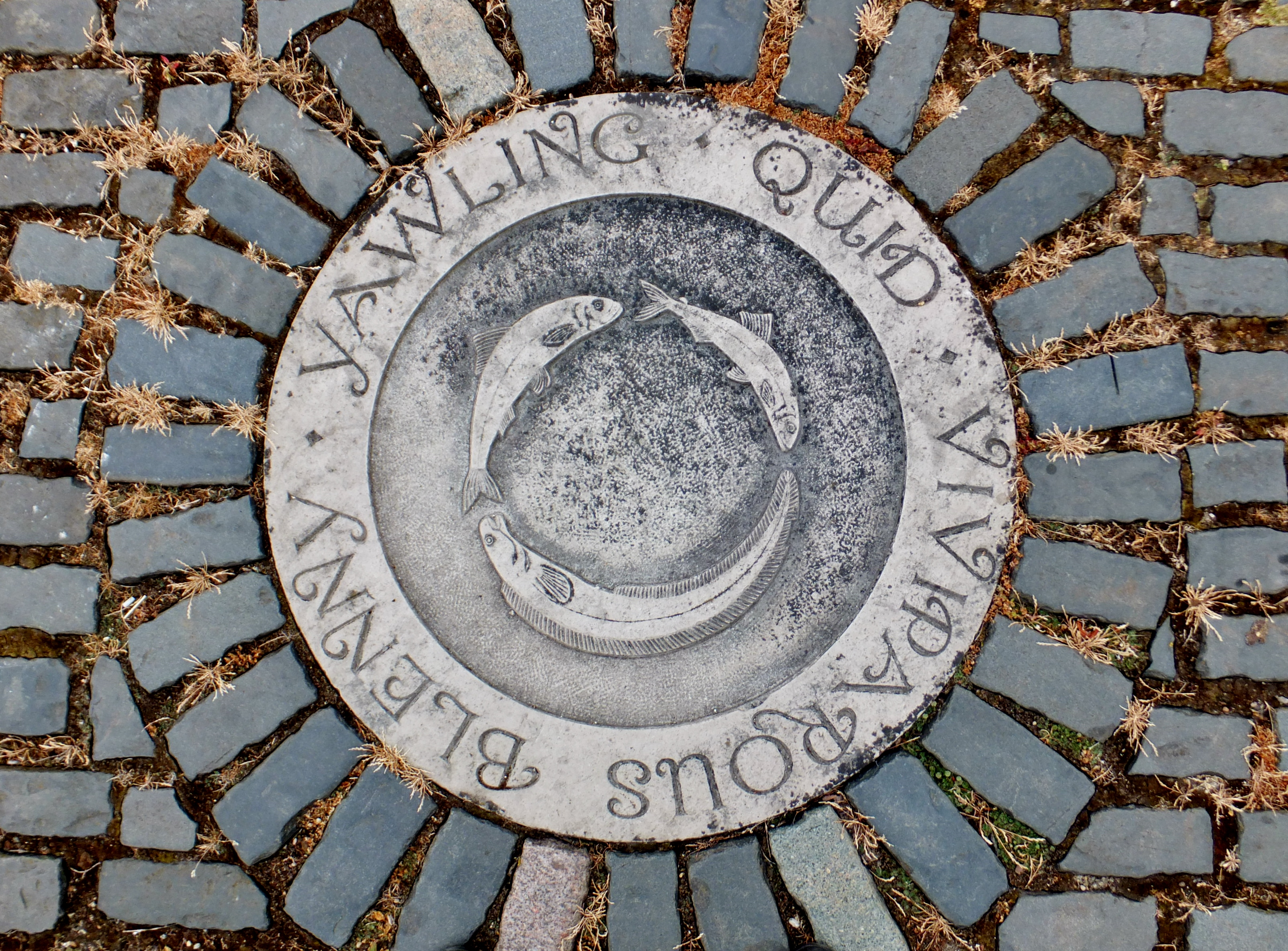
A stop on the self-guided Fish Pavement trail in Kingston upon Hull, by artist Gordon Young. The 1992 installation provides a walking tour of the city's fishing heritage.

There are also self-guided tours, which aid travellers by means of books, maps, pamphlets, and audio material.

== Tours of cities and cultural sites ==
=== With guides ===
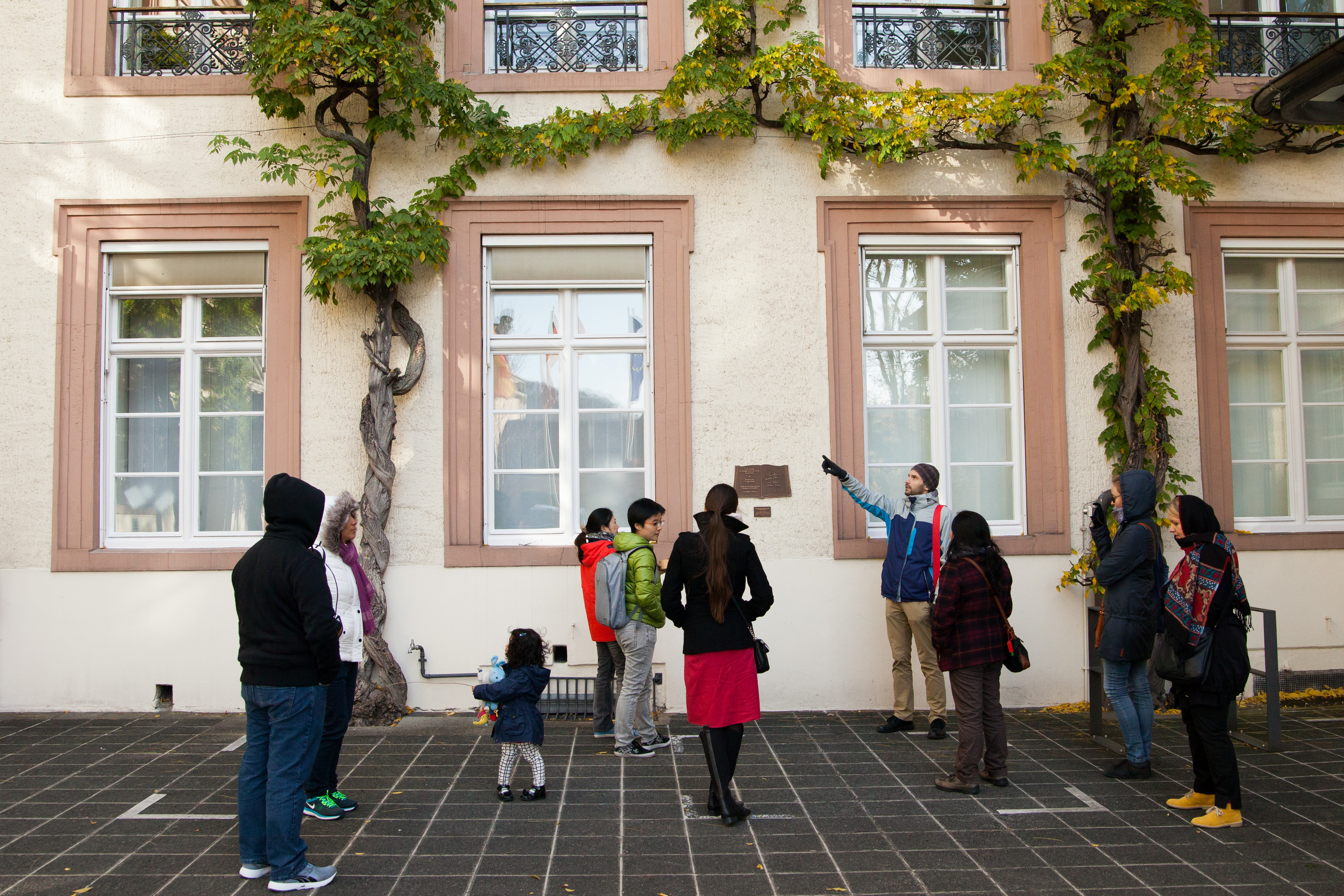
A guided walking tour in Baden-Baden

A walking tour is usually much shorter than an escorted tour, which may last for a week or more. They are led by guides that have knowledge of the places covered on the tour, and their historical, cultural and artistic significance.

Many walking tours involve a payment to the guide, although some operate on a tip system. The "pay what you want" model started around 2004, and can be found in many countries. The UK-based Guild of Registered Tour has criticised the system for not requiring any training or certification of its guides.

=== Urban theatre ===
Several cities now employ dramatic spectacle to add interest to their tours. Usually guided by actors in costume, these walking tours create the feel of living history "in a non-academic, very accessible fashion."

These tours are a form of promenade theatre, as well as museum theatre in that it makes use of first person interpretation.

== See also ==
- Audio tour
- Boston By Foot (Boston, USA)
- Big Onion Walking Tours (New York City)
- Caminhada Noturna, São Paulo
- Heritage trail
- Hiking
- Photowalking
- The Rings of Saturn, a novel by W. G. Sebald – involves a walking tour of Suffolk.
- Walking bus
