= Audio tour =

Recorded commentary at a visitor attraction

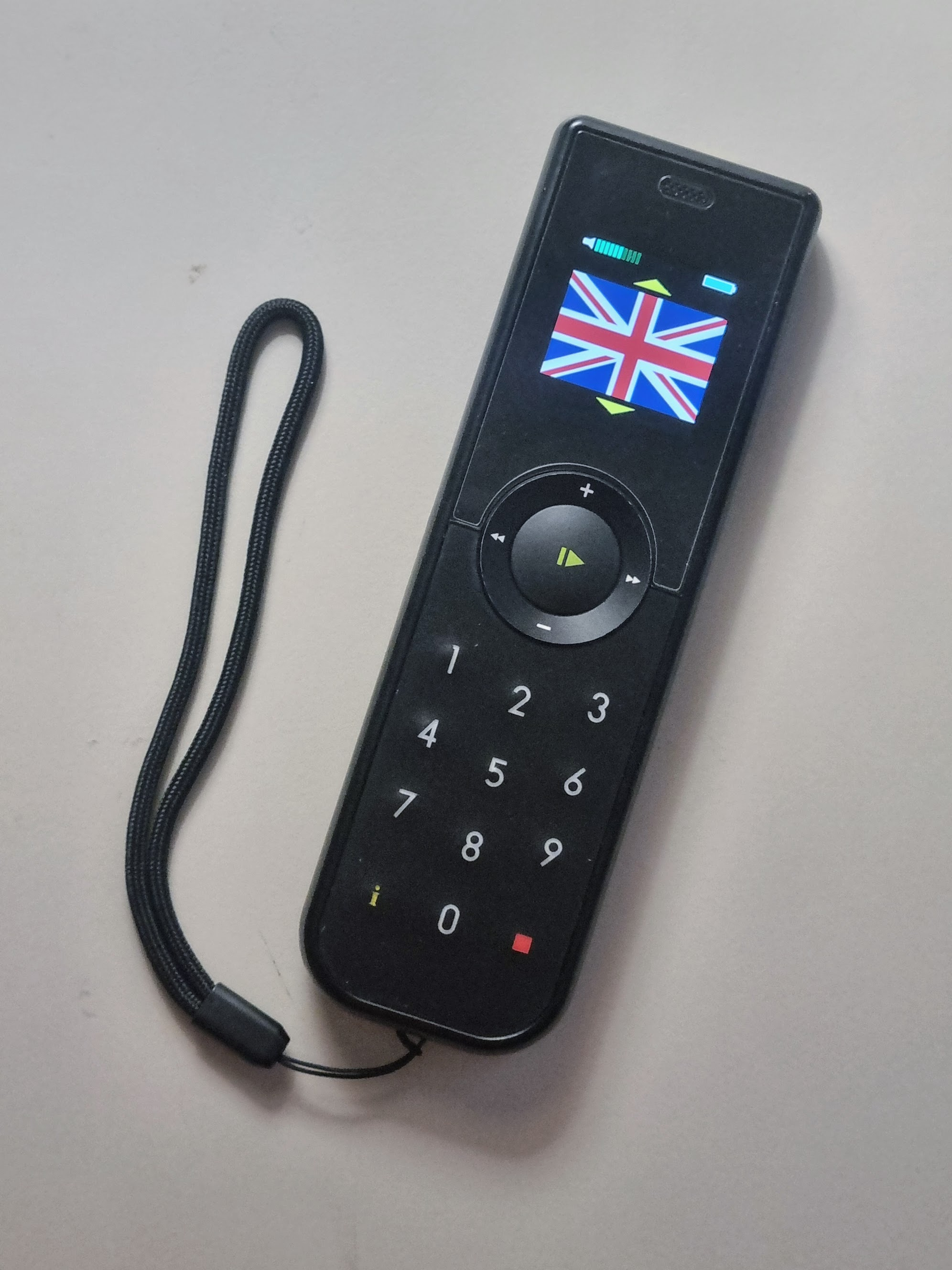
A Look2Innovate handheld audio guide device with a display, set to English

An audio tour or audio guide provides a recorded spoken commentary, normally through a handheld device, to a visitor attraction such as a museum or an exhibition. They are also available for self-guided tours of outdoor locations, or as a part of an organised tour. It provides background, context, and information on the things being viewed. Audio guides are often in multilingual versions and can be made available in different ways. Some of the more elaborate tours may include original music and interviews. They are traditionally rented on the spot, more recently downloaded from the Internet, or available via the mobile phone network. Some audio guides are free or included in the entrance fee, others have to be purchased separately.

== History ==
Willem Sandberg, director of the Stedelijk Museum in Amsterdam from 1945 to 1962, pioneered the world's first museum audio tours. When invented in 1952, the developers were drawn by its unique potential to mediate an experience individually controllable by each visitor, which was content-rich, was personal to them, was available at any time, and suited learning styles not served by catalog, text panel, or label.

Sandberg's ambulatory lectures were delivered through a closed-circuit shortwave radio broadcasting system in which the amplified audio output of an analog playback tape recorder served as a broadcast station, and transmission was via a loop aerial fixed around the gallery or galleries. Identical lectures in Dutch, French, English, and German were recorded onto magnetic tapes, broadcast in turn through the aerial, and picked up by visitors through a portable radio receiver with headphones, when inside the loop.

The system was such that all visitors with a receiver could only hear a specific piece of commentary at any time; hence, groups of visitors would move through the galleries and look at exhibits as if guided by an invisible force, in complete synchronicity.

== Use ==
=== Education ===
Audio tours are often used to provide visitors with additional information about exhibits, artifacts, or artworks.

=== Entertainment ===
Audio tours may include music, sound effects, and character voices to create a more entertaining experience. Some tours feature interactivity, for instance by playing audio files in response to visitors interacting with an exhibit.

=== Edutainment ===
Some audio tours are designed to be both educational and entertaining. They may feature, for example, voice actors playing characters inside of a painting instead of plainly explaining the history behind it, or by synchronizing the audio to external lights and videos to visually highlight the parts being explained.

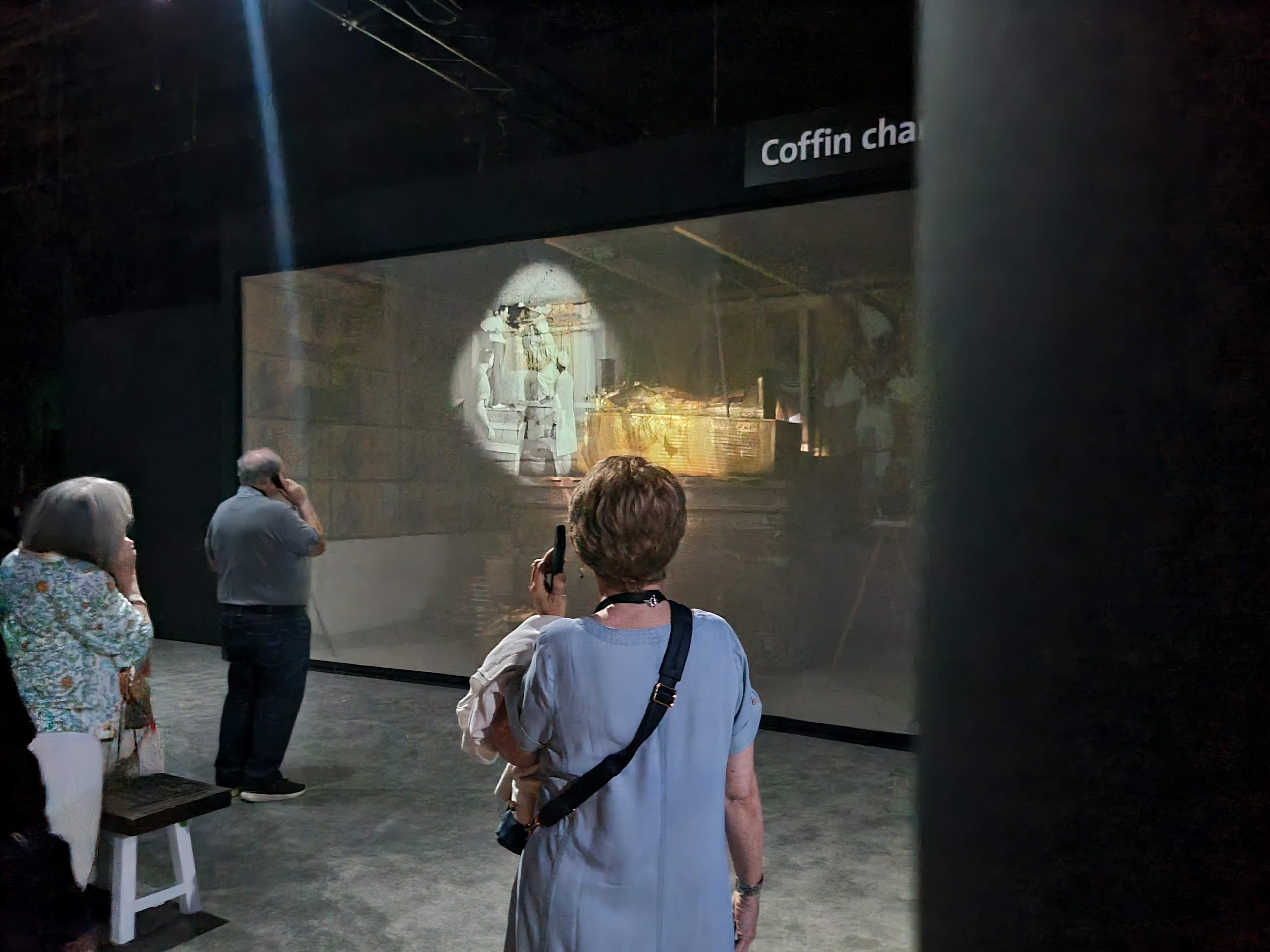
A group of visitors at an edutainment exhibition about Tutankhamun listens to an audio tour synchronized with a projection.

== Electronic multimedia guides ==
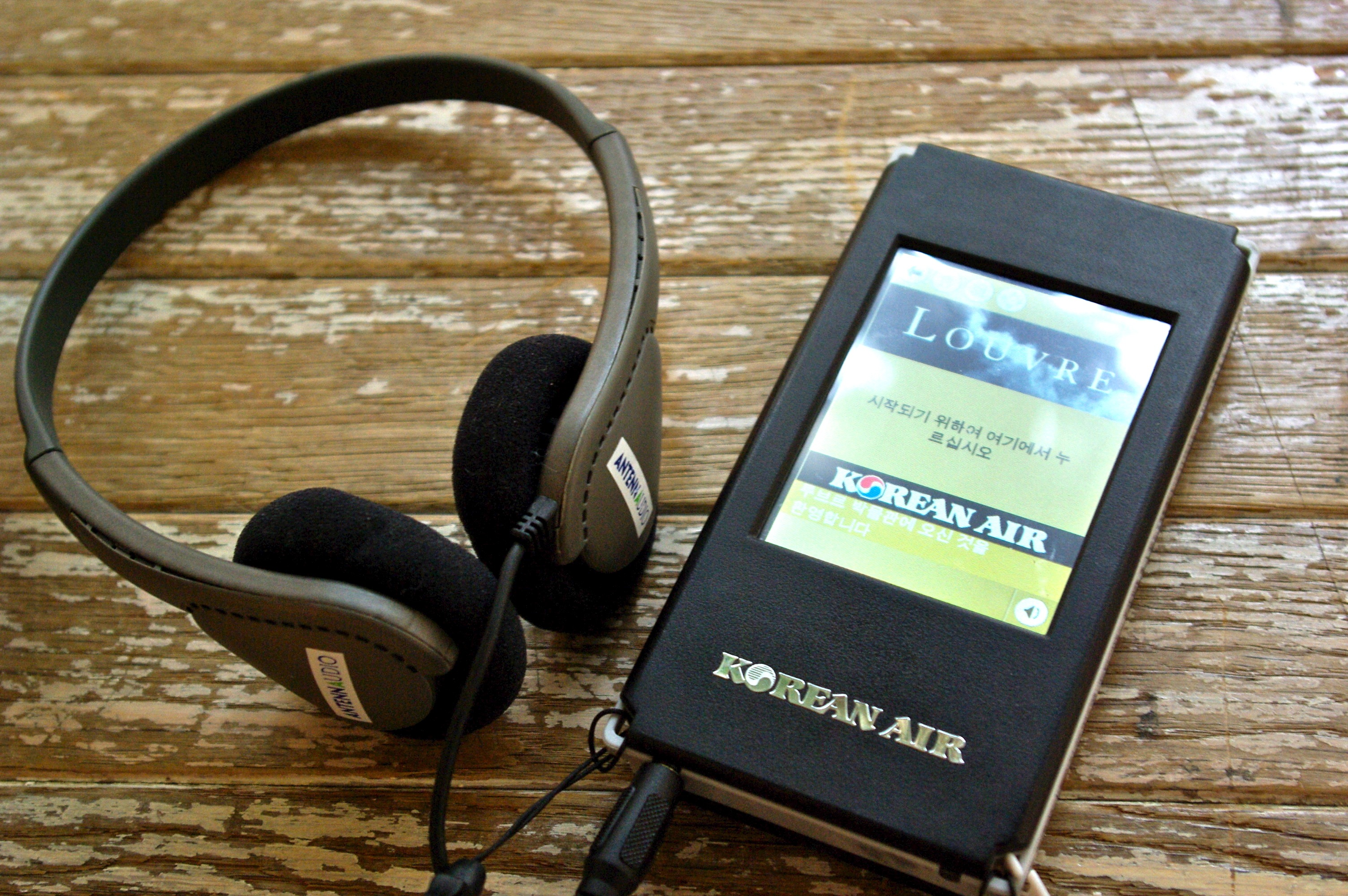
Audio guide set for Louvre tour supporting Korean language

A multimedia electronic guide is a device specially designed to provide audio, visual or textual content to museum visitors with or without user interaction. It may also provide alternative content corresponding to different personal preferences. It may include accessories such as headphones, a digital pen and displays with LEDs or LCD screens.

These smart guides may be operated to supply content in different languages and accents, with different voice alternatives, with text, and with age group specific content. They can be operated in several ways:

- Touch/push-button systems are operated by the visitor. The visitor enters the code assigned to the object or location to the electronic museum guide and the related content is provided.
- Location aware systems operate semi-automatically. They sense the location by several alternative technologies and provide the related content. If the sensing area is not narrow enough to detect every different object then the visitor will enter or select the content they want. Location aware systems provides better quality tours to disabled people.
- Line of Sight Aware Systems operate automatically. They sense the location and the target object and provides the related content. These systems may include software that will attempt to measure the visitor's aims and interest areas and may provide shallower or deeper information for the object. These systems may need special technologies for target detection.

These electronic guides can provide the museum management with useful statistics and reports, which may include tour statistics, visitor statistics, opinions, and other surveys.

== Cell phone tours ==
A cell phone tour is an audio tour where pre-recorded or stream audio interpretation for a heritage site or a cultural exhibit is provided via a cell phone. Cell phone audio tours have the advantage that most visitors already have the equipment needed to take the audio tour, being their cell phones.

Each venue is assigned a phone number with appropriate stop numbers, displayed next to the exhibit. Once a visitor has dialed in, they will be prompted and can enter the corresponding stop number of the exhibit they’re viewing, to hear the recorded content. These tours also enable the visitors to: fast forward, rewind, pause, as well as leave a feedback message for each exhibit or the whole tour; simply by pressing a number. In addition to audio content, some providers are also able to stream video, and text message recent visitors with updates. This is the old-style approach, not used widely.

== Smartphone tours ==
Smartphones have significant advantages over cell phones, as they have story-triggering technologies (GPS, bluetooth, NFC, QR-code scanner) and can use the power of mobile apps to deliver the right story in the right language in the right place and in the right context (e.g. the evening tour, or a winter tour). Stories could be adjusted to the pace and mood of the user. Of course, such guided tours will use other types of content, above audio: photo, texts, video, quests. Such apps can work online and offline.

Given the low download rate of single use native mobile apps, partly due to app fatigue, in recent years museums have been following a growing trend to offer Progressive web applications (PWAs) or Web applications that can be accessed via QR-code without the need to download any app. One of the problems of those browser-based smartphone tours is the difficulty of monetizing them. To solve this problem, some companies resort to unique codes that must be entered into the web-app and expire after a certain period of time, or to non-transferable but reusable unique codes printed on a card that anonymously recognize the device used by the visitor.

Many applications also provide GPS-based navigation that guides visitors along predefined walking routes. As users approach specific locations, the application automatically triggers the corresponding audio segment, allowing the tour to unfold in a location-aware sequence. Unlike traditional guided tours with a fixed schedule, mobile audio tours allow visitors to explore at their own pace, pause the narration, or skip stops. While audio tours were historically associated with museums and galleries, many modern applications focus on outdoor cultural heritage, including historic city districts, archaeological sites, and walking routes through urban environments. Most applications also allow users to download content in advance so that the tour can be used offline without mobile data access. Examples include platforms such as GuideSofia, VoiceMap, TouringBee and izi.TRAVEL.
