= Adina Merenlender =

American conservation biologist

Adina M. Merenlender
- Born: Adina Maya Merenlender; October 1, 1963 (age 63); Seattle, Washington
- Education: University of California, San Diego; Princeton University; University of Rochester
- Scientific career
- Fields: Conservation biology, environmental science
- Workplaces: University of California, Berkeley; Stanford University
- Thesis: The Effects of Sociality on the Demography and Genetic Structure of Lemur fulvus rufus (polygamous) and Lemur rubriventer (monogamous) & the Conservation Implications
- Website: ucanr.edu/people/adina-merenlender

Adina Merenlender (born October 1, 1963) is a Professor of Cooperative Extension in Conservation Science at University of California, Berkeley in the Environmental Science, Policy, and Management Department, and is an internationally recognized conservation biologist known for land-use planning, watershed science, landscape connectivity, and naturalist and stewardship training.

== Early life and education ==
Merenlender was born in Seattle, Washington and raised in West Los Angeles, California.

Merenlender graduated from UC California San Diego in 1985 with a BA in Biology, where she also received her MS from the Department of Ecology and Evolutionary Biology in 1986. As a senior at UCSD, after listening to a seminar given on conservation by David Woodruff, she was inspired and switched her focus to conservation genetics. From there, she was involved in studying African rhinoceroses in collaboration with Oliver Ryder at the San Diego Zoo. She was a visiting graduate student at Princeton University from 1987 to 1993, and she graduated from the University of Rochester in 1993 with a PhD in Biology.

== Career ==
After earning her PhD in Biology, Merenlender did her post-doctoral fellowship at the Center for Conservation Biology at Stanford University from 1993 to 1995, researching riparian plant and aquatic insect communities on Great Basin working lands under different livestock grazing regimes. She started her career at UC Berkeley as Assistant Cooperative Extension Specialist and adjunct professor in 1995, at which time she moved to Mendocino County to conduct research at the UC Hopland Research and Extension Center, a 5,358-acre field station.

Upon arriving in California's wine country, Merenlender conducted some of the first research in Vinecology, the integration of ecological and viticultural practice to produce solutions for wine production and nature conservation. Merenlender continues to advance conservation. Her work across California's North Coast vineyard landscape also includes watershed studies, revealing ways to avoid summer water withdrawals from streams to irrigate wine grapes, which is a necessary step to recovering California's salmon runs.

Merenlender led the earliest inquiries into the realized conservation benefits, or lack thereof, from conservation easements which spurred a large and still-growing body of scholarship on the topic. She also provided some of the first evidence for the impacts of quiet recreation on meso-carnivores and sparked continued field research into recreation management to minimize these impacts.

Merenlender started the California Naturalist Program and served as its founding director. Building on the success of this program, Merenlender helped start the first public education and service program on climate stewardship, including writing Climate Stewardship: Taking Collective Action to Protect California with Brendan Buhler. The two programs provide collective impact on ecological health through community and citizen science, contributed to by over 10,000 certified naturalists and climate stewards.

In 2004, Merenlender was a visiting scholar at the University of Queensland Department of Zoology in Brisbane, Australia. She was also a visiting scholar at the National Autonomous University of Mexico (UNAM) in Mexico City in 2008, and with the Cambridge Conservation Initiative through the University of Cambridge Zoology Department in 2019.

As president, Merenlender worked with the Governing Board and staff to reorganize the Society of Conservation Biology as a global network to preserve biodiversity.

In 2005, Merelender co-authored Economics and Land Change in Prioritizing Private Land Conservation, published in Society of Conservation Biology.

Now, Merenlender continues to make strides in the field of Environmental Science and Policy & Management at UC Berkley. She's currently leading multiple projects that maps, models, and monitors natural resources along side land use patterns by humans.

Merenlender’s conservation work includes the use of spatially explicit decision-support systems for conservation planning.

== Awards and honors ==
- Conservation planning award, American Planning Association, 2001
- President, Society for Conservation Biology, 2019-2021
- California Academy of Sciences Fellow, 2018
- Distinguished service award for outstanding extension work at UC Agriculture and Natural Resources (UCANR), 2016
- Program of the Year, California Naturalist Program, by Alliance for Natural Resource Outreach and Service Programs, 2015
- Handling Editor, journal, Conservation Biology
- Section Editor, journal, PlosOne

== Published works ==
Merenlender has published over 100 scientific research articles on the relationships between land use and biodiversity, and co-authored a book on wildlife corridor planning, Corridor Ecology: The science and practice of linking landscapes for biodiversity conservation, with the first edition published in 2006 and the second in 2019. She also co-authored The California Naturalist Handbook, now in its second edition, and Climate Stewardship: Taking Collective Action to Protect California.

=== Selected publications ===
- Merenlender, Adina; Lapena, Sage (December 2025). "Tribal Naturalists". News from Native California.
- De Nevers, G; Edelman, D.S.; Merenlender, A.M. (2025). The California Naturalist Handbook (2nd ed.). UC Press. ISBN 9780520412712.
- Merelender, A.M.; Keeley, A; Hilty, J (2026). "Habitat Connectivity and Ecological Corridors for Biodiversity Conservation". Reference Module in Earth Systems and Environmental Sciences: 80–92. doi:10.1016/B978-0-443-21964-1.00028-8. ISBN 978-0-443-21965-8.
- Andreozzi, C; Kitzes, J; Dawson, T; Merenlender, A.M. (March 6, 2024). "Influence of microclimate and forest management on bat species faced with global change". Conservation Biology. 38 (4) e14246. Bibcode:2024ConBi..38E4246A. doi:10.1111/cobi.14246. PMID 38445689.
- Nelson, S.M.; Ira, G; Merenlender, A.M. (2022). "Adult Climate Change Education Advances Learning, Self-Efficacy, and Agency for Community-Scale Stewardship". Sustainability. 14 (3): 1804. Bibcode:2022Sust...14.1804N. doi:10.3390/su14031804.
- Merenlender, A.M.; et al. (Buhler, B) (2021). Climate Stewardship: Taking Collective Action to Protect California. UC Press. ISBN 9780520378940.
- Gray, M; Micheli, E; Comendant, T; Merenlender, A.M. (2020). "Quantifying Climate-Wise Connectivity across a Topographically Diverse Landscape". Land. 9 (10): 355. Bibcode:2020Land....9..355G. doi:10.3390/land9100355.
- MUÑOZ-SÁEZ, A; HEATON, E; REYNOLDS, M; MERENLENDER, A.M. (2020). "Agricultural adapters from the vineyard landscape impact native oak woodland birds". Agriculture, Ecosystems and Environment. 300 106960. Bibcode:2020AgEE..30006960M. doi:10.1016/j.agee.2020.106960.
- Elsen, Paul R.; Monahan, William B.; Dougherty, Eric R.; Merenlender, Adina M. (June 2020). "Keeping pace with climate change in global terrestrial protected areas". Science Advances. 6 (25) eaay0814. Bibcode:2020SciA....6..814E. doi:10.1126/sciadv.aay0814. ISSN 2375-2548. PMC 7299617. PMID 32596440.
- Hilty, Jodi; Keeley, Annika; Lidicker Jr., William; Merenlender, Adina (2019). "Corridor Ecology: Linking Landscapes for Biodiversity Conservation and Climate Adaptation (second edition)". The Journal of Wildlife Management. 84 (4): 829. doi:10.1002/jwmg.21836. ISBN 978-1-61091-951-7. S2CID 213775788.
- Kremen, C.; Merenlender, A. M. (2018-10-18). "Landscapes that work for biodiversity and people". Science. 362 (6412) eaau6020. doi:10.1126/science.aau6020. ISSN 0036-8075. PMID 30337381. S2CID 53012788.
- Gray, Morgan & Merenlender, Adina & Micheli, Lisa. (2018). Seasonal temperature variation informs climate connectivity across a human-modified and topographically diverse region.
- Kitzes, Justin; Merenlender, Adina (March 2013). "Extinction risk and tradeoffs in reserve site selection for species of different body sizes: Reserve design by species body size". Conservation Letters. 6 (5): 341–349. doi:10.1111/conl.12015.
- Reed, Sarah E.; Merenlender, Adina M. (2008-06-28). "Quiet, Nonconsumptive Recreation Reduces Protected Area Effectiveness". Conservation Letters. 1 (3): 146–154. Bibcode:2008ConL....1..146R. doi:10.1111/j.1755-263x.2008.00019.x. ISSN 1755-263X. S2CID 13424093.
- Newburn, David A.; Berck, Peter; Merenlender, Adina M. (February 2006). "Habitat and Open Space at Risk of Land-Use Conversion: Targeting Strategies for Land Conservation". American Journal of Agricultural Economics. 88 (1): 28–42. doi:10.1111/j.1467-8276.2006.00837.x. ISSN 0002-9092. S2CID 154549055.
- Merenlender, A. M.; Huntsinger, L.; Guthey, G.; Fairfax, S. K. (February 2004). "Land Trusts and Conservation Easements: Who Is Conserving What for Whom?". Conservation Biology. 18 (1): 65–76. Bibcode:2004ConBi..18...65M. doi:10.1111/j.1523-1739.2004.00401.x. ISSN 0888-8892. S2CID 35032260.
