= Big Onion Walking Tours =

Big Onion Walking Tours is the largest walking tour company in New York City. The company has offered tours of the city since 1991. Big Onion shows visitors & tourists alike the diverse fabric of urban neighborhoods, using as guides doctoral students PhDs who are studying history or closely related fields.

== History ==
Big Onion was founded by Columbia University graduate students Seth Kamil and Ed O'Donnell in 1991. They were initially encouraged by Kenneth T. Jackson, a Columbia professor and prominent historian of New York City. For decades Jackson has required his students at Columbia to explore the city on foot and even to write walking tours as academic assignments. Kamil and O'Donnell initially gave walking tours on ad hoc basis for museums and school groups as a way to help to pay for graduate school. What started as an informal enterprise gradually developed into a small company as they began giving public "show-up" tours that were listed in the newspaper. Soon thereafter, they hired colleagues at Columbia, New York University, and CUNY, and other doctoral programs to help lead tours. O'Donnell left the company in 1994 to pursue an academic career. Kamil continues to run the organization and lead tours himself.

In 2001, Jackson wrote in the preface to the first published collection of Big Onion tours:

"New York is fundamentally a walking city, so what better way is there to see it? The reason Big Onion Walking Tours has succeeded is that it makes the city's history accessible and understandable--not to mention entertaining. This is no small feat given New Yorkers' unforgiving nature and the difficulty of running any business here, let alone one founded by graduate students. Big Onion began with only three tours--Immigrant New York, the Jewish Lower East Side, and Ellis Island. Today there are almost thirty, all of which peel back the layers, like an onion, to reveal what's beneath."

After 9-11, Big Onion had a marked decrease in patrons, while maintaining its public tour roster, no groups chose to take tours from September 12 through October 29, 2001:

It was a tour that Big Onion Walking Tours usually conducts dozens of times each fall, all over the city, for school groups from all over the country. But it was the first one that Big Onion had done since Sept. 11. In the aftermath of the terrorist attack, the economic woes of New York businesses that feed, entertain, house and generally cater to visitors have been well documented. But the ripple effect has also spread to the tour guides who depend heavily on traffic from out-of-town schools.

— David W. Chen, The New York Times

They have since recovered, as has other tourism in New York City.

As of 2018, Seth Kamil continues to serve as president, and Big Onion employs more than three dozen veteran guides from universities all over the region (many "retired" guides have moved on to successful academic & NGO careers). Each year Big Onion offers hundreds of show-up tours to the public and hundreds more to schools, businesses, law firms, non-profits, and families. It is a programming partner with both New-York Historical Society and Brooklyn Historical Society. Big Onion also provides guide services for a number of non-profit groups and local BIDS, including PBS (Satan's Seat: New York during Prohibition tour).

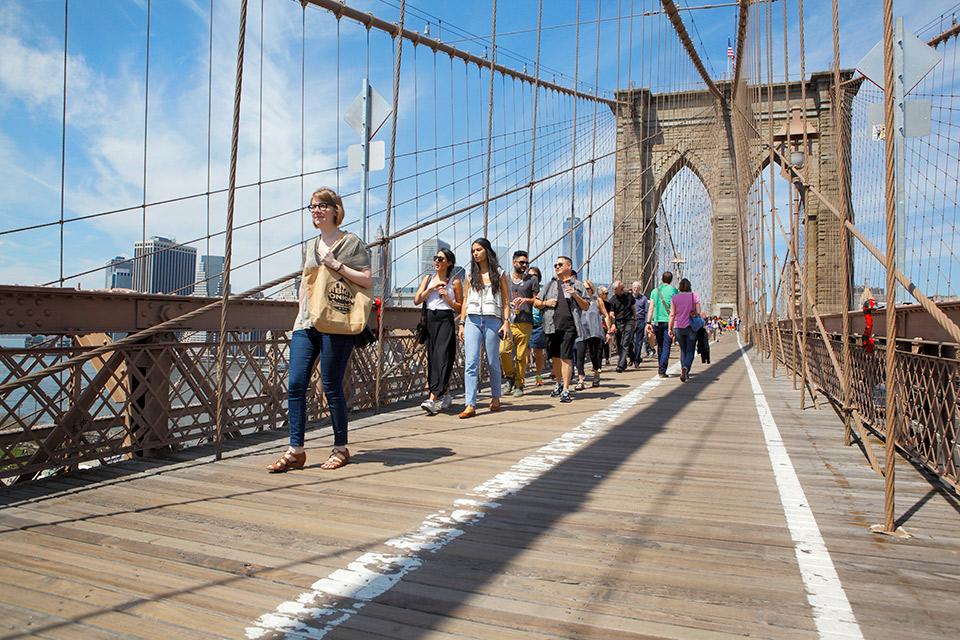

== Tours ==
Big Onion provides primarily historical and literary walking tours, to show the sites not shown on "plaques". They also focus on neighborhoods, such as the Lower East Side, often missed by other operators.

Big Onion gives tours in more than two dozen neighborhoods and parks in Manhattan and Brooklyn every day of the year but Thanksgiving Day, rain or shine. Tours meet at or near a subway stop and are typically two hours long. Since each guide is encouraged to bring her own perspective and expertise to her tour, no two tours are alike. Guides often incorporate their academic areas of interest into their tours and provide listeners with historical context as well as running commentary on architecture, immigration, urban development and historic figures. Several tours concentrate on the history of specific ethnic groups and neighborhoods.

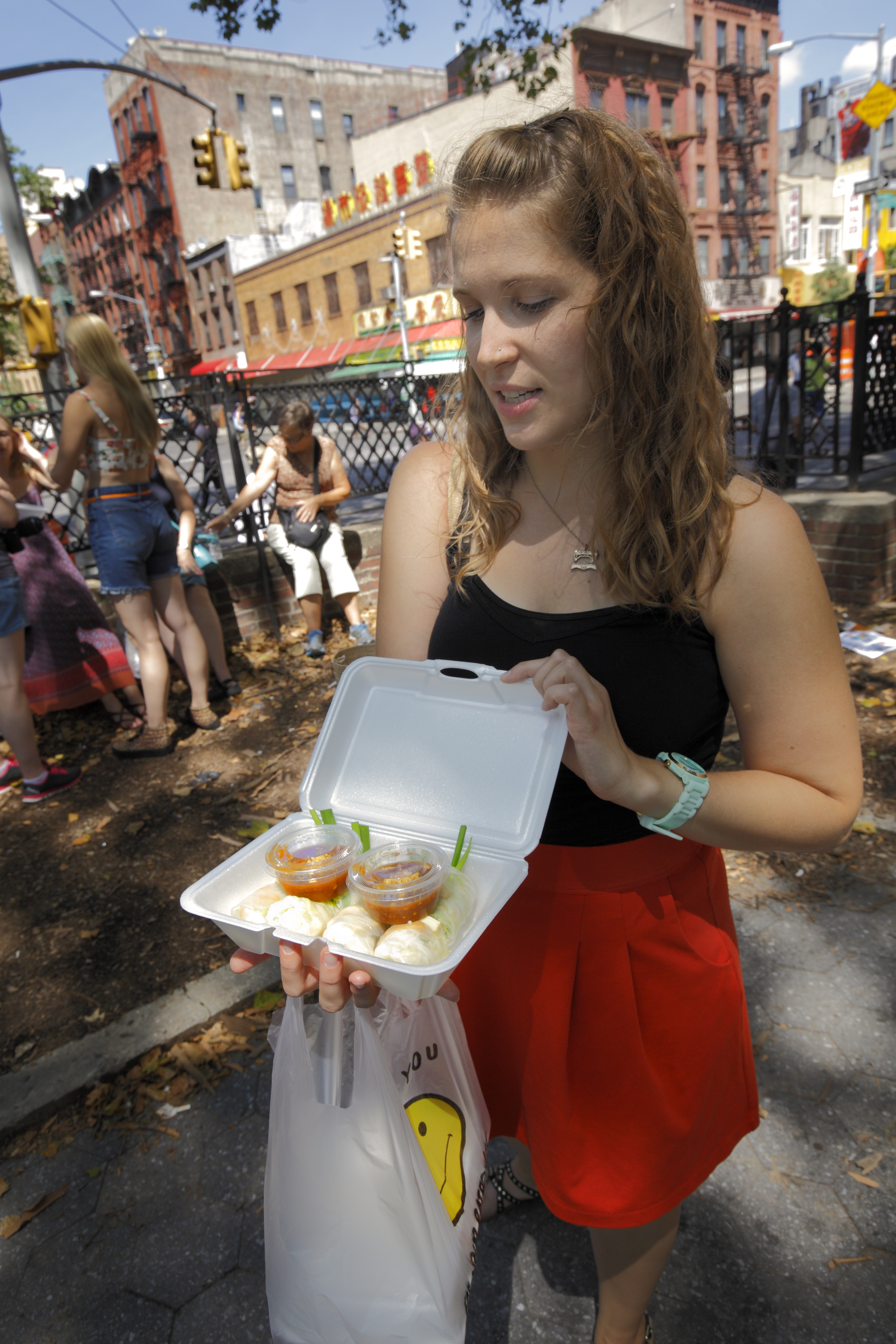

The latest Big Onion creations include: "America's Museum: Art & History of the Metropolitan"; Historic TriBeCa; "Art, Sex and Rock & Roll: New York on the Cultural Edge"; and "STEAM in the Village: Artistry, Invention & Exploration - a walking tour weaving together science, technology and the history of New York City. Big Onion crafts a new tour once or twice a year.

== Awards and accolades ==
Big Onion has been written up in over 100 publications worldwide. The company has been won numerous "Best of New York" awards, including:

- "Best of New York", New York Magazine, May 4, 1998
- "The World's Best City Walks", Forbes.com, August 18, 2010
- "Best Place to take Out of Town Guests", The Village Voice, October 15–21, 2014

== Books ==
Two collections of Big Onion tours have been published by NYU Press. The first is The Big Onion Guide to New York City, published in 2002, and the second is the Big Onion Guide to Brooklyn, published in 2005.
