= Wilderness Press =

American publisher of maps and guidebooks

- Parent company: Keen Communications
- Founded: 1967
- Founder: Thomas Winnett
- Country of origin: United States
- Headquarters location: Birmingham, Alabama
- Distribution: Publishers Group West
- Publication types: Books, Maps
- Official website: www.wildernesspress.com

Wilderness Press is a publisher of outdoor guidebooks and maps that was founded in Berkeley, California in 1967. Its first publication was Sierra North (1967/2005). Reissued in 2005, this is considered the authoritative guidebook for hikers and backpackers in the Northern Sierra Nevada.

Since the debut of Sierra North in 1967, Wilderness Press has become well known for its outdoor titles, guidebooks, and maps. It has been owned by Keen Communications since 2008, and headquarters have moved to Birmingham, Alabama.

== Select bibliography ==
- Walking Brooklyn
