= Diana Tomback =

American ecologist and an academic

Diana F. Tomback
- Born: United States
- Occupations: Ecologist and academic

Academic background
- Education: B.A., Zoology; M.A., Zoology; PhD Biological Sciences
- Alma mater: University of California at Los Angeles; University of California at Santa Barbara

Diana F. Tomback is an American ecologist and an academic. She is a professor of Integrative Biology at the University of Colorado Denver as well as the policy and outreach coordinator at the Whitebark Pine Ecosystem Foundation, a non-profit organization.

Tomback has worked in the fields of evolutionary ecology, avian ecology, conservation biology and forest ecology, primarily focusing on the ecology of bird-dispersed pines and their corvid dispersers. She is best known for research on the coevolved mutualism between whitebark pine (Pinus albicaulis) and its avian seed disperser Clark's nutcracker (Nucifraga columbiana) and for studies or compilations on the ecology and restoration of whitebark pine. Among her notable works are publications in academic journals, including Journal of Animal Ecology, Forest Ecology and Management, Ecological Applications, BioScience, and Ecology and Evolution as well as an edited book titled Whitebark Pine Communities: Ecology And Restoration.

== Education ==
Tomback completed her Bachelor of Arts in zoology at the University of California at Los Angeles in 1970, followed by a Master of Arts in zoology in 1972 from the same institution with ornithologists Nicholas E. Collias and Thomas R. Howell as advisors. In 1977, she obtained a PhD in biological sciences from the University of California at Santa Barbara working in the fields of avian behavioral ecology, advised by Stephen I. Rothstein.

== Career ==
In 1977, while writing her dissertation, she was appointed as postdoctoral fellow and instructor in the College of Agriculture and Life Sciences at Brigham Young University, where she collaborated with Joseph R. Murphy on studies of ferruginous hawks. After obtaining her PhD, from 1977 to 1981, she held various appointments, including a stint as a visiting assistant professor of zoology at Pomona College from 1977 to 1978; a lectureship in Biology at the University of California, Riverside between 1978 and 1979; and a postdoctoral fellowship in the Department of Zoology at Colorado State University, working with avian behaviorist Myron C. Baker. In 1981, she began a faculty position at the University of Colorado Denver. During her tenure at the University of Colorado, she followed the traditional academic progression, starting as an assistant professor of biology from 1981 to 1986, followed by a promotion to associate professor of biology in 1986. Since 1995, she has held the position of professor of Integrative Biology at the University of Colorado Denver.

Tomback was a founding member and director of the Whitebark Pine Ecosystem Foundation, Missoula, Montana, from 2001 to 2017.

== Media coverage ==
Over the years, Tomback's work has garnered media attention, especially concerning the status of whitebark pine, with several interviews with regional public radio stations and coverage in multiple news outlets such as WIRED, the Denver Post and The Washington Post.

== Works ==
Throughout her career, Tomback has contributed to several books, including authoring chapters in Why Birds Matter. Avian Ecological Functions and Ecosystem Services, Mountain Ecosystems : Dynamics, Management, and Conservation. and Sierra East. She also served as lead editor for themed journal issues of Forest Ecology and Management and Forests. Moreover, she played a role in addressing the decline of whitebark pine ecosystems by assuming the lead editor role for the book Whitebark Pine Communities: Ecology And Restoration, published in 2001. The book reviewed the ecological importance, decline, and management strategies for whitebark pine in western high-mountain regions, highlighting the impact of exotic disease, historical mountain pine beetle outbreaks, and altered fire regimes on this widely-distributed high elevation species and offering insights for restoration efforts.

In 2002, Tomback authored a chapter in the book Rocky Mountain Futures: An Ecological Perspective, wherein she provided an analysis of the Rocky Mountains' biodiversity, addressing the contrast between its perceived untouched state and the reality of significant anthropogenic impacts. The book also advocated for intensive management and conservation efforts to preserve its ecological integrity. Moreover, she also contributed to the book Yellowstone's Birds: Diversity and Abundance in the World's First National Park. The book serves as a guide to the birds of Yellowstone National Park, covering over 200 species.

== Research ==
Tomback's early research explored the essential role of the Clark's nutcracker in seed dispersal and regeneration of whitebark pine. She studied the year-round utilization of fresh and stored pine seeds by nutcrackers. Her investigations uncovered information on seed caching locations, diverse forest community utilization, seed store relocation strategies, and the crucial role nutcrackers play in facilitating forest regeneration for several western conifers. Beginning in 1987, as a faculty member at the University of Colorado Denver, she contributed to an inter-agency research team investigating the decline of whitebark pine in the Northern Rocky Mountains, leading to a USDA Forest Service Centennial Conservation Award in 1991 for her role in clarifying the nutcracker's importance in whitebark pine regeneration. In her 1990 exploration of the evolution of bird-pine mutualisms, she and collaborator Yan Linhart examined the approximately 100 species of pines and proposed that bird-dispersed pines likely evolved from ancestors dispersed by wind, with the absence of wings as a derived character shaped through interactions between corvids, the environment, and pines. In addition, she collaborated with various students and colleagues on studies of population structure and community dynamics in whitebark pine and related pines. She researched the growth patterns and genetic structure of individual Swiss stone pine trees in Switzerland, exploring the influence of seed caching by the Eurasian nutcracker (N. caryoctactes).

For much of her career, Tomback has worked at the interface between forest ecology and avian ecology. Her collaborations with former graduate students resulted in two key management papers, addressing the effects of forest health declines on whitebark pine cone production and the probability of nutcracker seed dispersal. In 2010, collaborating with botanist Peter Achuff, she addressed the ecological significance, threats, and challenges facing white pine species in western Canada and the United States. Emphasizing their contributions to biodiversity and ecosystem services, her work underscored the urgent need for conservation and management interventions. In 2011, as part of a team of ornithologists, she explored the economic and practical value of birds, specifically highlighting the ecosystem services they provide to human society. In 2012, she and collaborators participated in a study using the Illumina Seq-to-SSR method, a cost-effective and efficient means of identifying microsatellites in species genomes. The method's reliability, particularly for species with few SSR loci, was demonstrated through comparisons between the Burmese python, two bird species, and 454 sequencing, showcasing its affordability and applicability. From about 2006 to 2018, she and her students researched the distribution and functional role of whitebark pine in treeline communities, working in the northern Rockies of the U.S. and in Canada. She returned to nutcracker-related studies focusing on understanding nutcracker energetics and decision-making. She continued collaborating with a working group advocating for avian ecosystem services, and quantified nutcracker seed dispersal for whitebark pine, resulting in the contributed volume, Why Birds Matter, edited by Cagan H. Şekercioğlu, Daniel G. Wenny, and Christopher J. Whelan, which highlighted the ecological functions of birds, including a chapter authored by her. In addition, she and Elizabeth Pansing, systematically investigated the potential use of simulated nutcracker caching, termed "direct seeding," as a restoration method for whitebark pine, emphasizing the intersection of nutcracker seed dispersal and conservation.

== Awards and honors ==
- 1983 – Elective Member, American Ornithologists' Union
- 1991 – Centennial Conservation Award, U.S. Forest Service
- 1994 – Fellow, American Ornithologists' Union
- 2014 – Outstanding Faculty Achievement Award, College of Liberal Arts and Sciences, University of Colorado Denver
- 2015 – Charles Bullard Fellowship, Harvard University
- 2024 – AAAS Fellow

== Bibliography ==
=== Books ===
- Tomback, Diana F.; Arno, Stephen F.; Keane, Robert E., eds. (2001). Whitebark Pine Communities: Ecology And Restoration. Island Press. ISBN 978-1-55963-717-6.
- Tomback, Diana F., ed. (2019). Biodiversity and Conservation in Forests. doi:10.3390/books978-3-03897-575-5. ISBN 978-3-03897-575-5.

=== Selected articles ===
- Tomback, Diana F. (June 1982). "Dispersal of Whitebark Pine Seeds by Clark's Nutcracker: A Mutualism Hypothesis". The Journal of Animal Ecology. 51 (2): 451–467. Bibcode:1982JAnEc..51..451T. doi:10.2307/3976. JSTOR 3976.
- Tomback, Diana F.; Linhart, Yan B. (July 1990). "The evolution of bird-dispersed pines". Evolutionary Ecology. 4 (3): 185–219. Bibcode:1990EvEco...4..185T. doi:10.1007/BF02214330.
- Tomback, D. F.; Achuff, P. (August 2010). "Blister rust and western forest biodiversity: ecology, values and outlook for white pines". Forest Pathology. 40 (3–4): 186–225. Bibcode:2010FoPat..40..186T. doi:10.1111/j.1439-0329.2010.00655.x.
- Wenny, Daniel G.; DeVault, Travis L.; Johnson, Matthew D.; Kelly, Dave; H. Sekercioglu, Cagan; Tomback, Diana F.; Whelan, Christopher J. (January 2011). "The Need to Quantify Ecosystem Services Provided by Birds". The Auk. 128 (1): 1–14. doi:10.1525/auk.2011.10248.
- Castoe, Todd A.; Poole, Alexander W.; de Koning, A. P. Jason; Jones, Kenneth L.; Tomback, Diana F.; Oyler-McCance, Sara J.; Fike, Jennifer A.; Lance, Stacey L.; Streicher, Jeffrey W.; Smith, Eric N.; Pollock, David D. (14 February 2012). "Rapid Microsatellite Identification from Illumina Paired-End Genomic Sequencing in Two Birds and a Snake". PLOS ONE. 7 (2) e30953. Bibcode:2012PLoSO...730953C. doi:10.1371/journal.pone.0030953. PMC 3279355. PMID 22348032.
