= Lost Cement Mine =

Legendary gold vein situated in the eastern Sierra Nevada of California, United States

- Gold vein
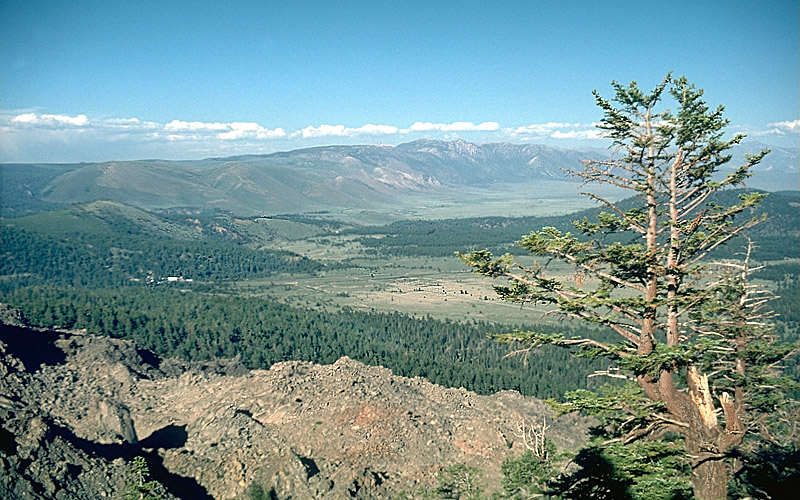
- General area where Gid Whiteman searched for the Lost Cement Mine.
- Location: Sierra Nevada, California, USA

The Lost Cement Mine is a legendary gold vein situated in the eastern Sierra Nevada of California, United States.

It was supposedly found in 1857 by two men who were separated from their group while crossing the Sierra. They traveled near the headwaters of the Owens River, and found some hardened red igneous rock that may have had a large amount of gold in it. One of the men kept the ore, but was dying of tuberculosis in 1860, so gave the ore to a Doctor Randall in payment, along with a rough location of it. In miner's parlance of the era, the red igneous rock was known as "cement", hence the name of the lost mine.

Doctor Randall and his assistant Gid Whiteman spent years looking for the ore in the pumice hills to the south and west of Deadman Summit. News of the search leaked out to the mining communities near Mono Lake. This news caused a frenzy of furtive searching. Mark Twain was near Mono Lake and joined in the search, which was documented in his book Roughing It.

James Wright wrote a series of newspaper articles about the search in 1879. He speculated that the lost cement was actually found across the Sierra Crest, near Devils Postpile. Wright claimed that the lost cement mine was mined for a number of years in secret, and then the mining cabin was destroyed to prevent others from finding the ore.
